= Rokytná =

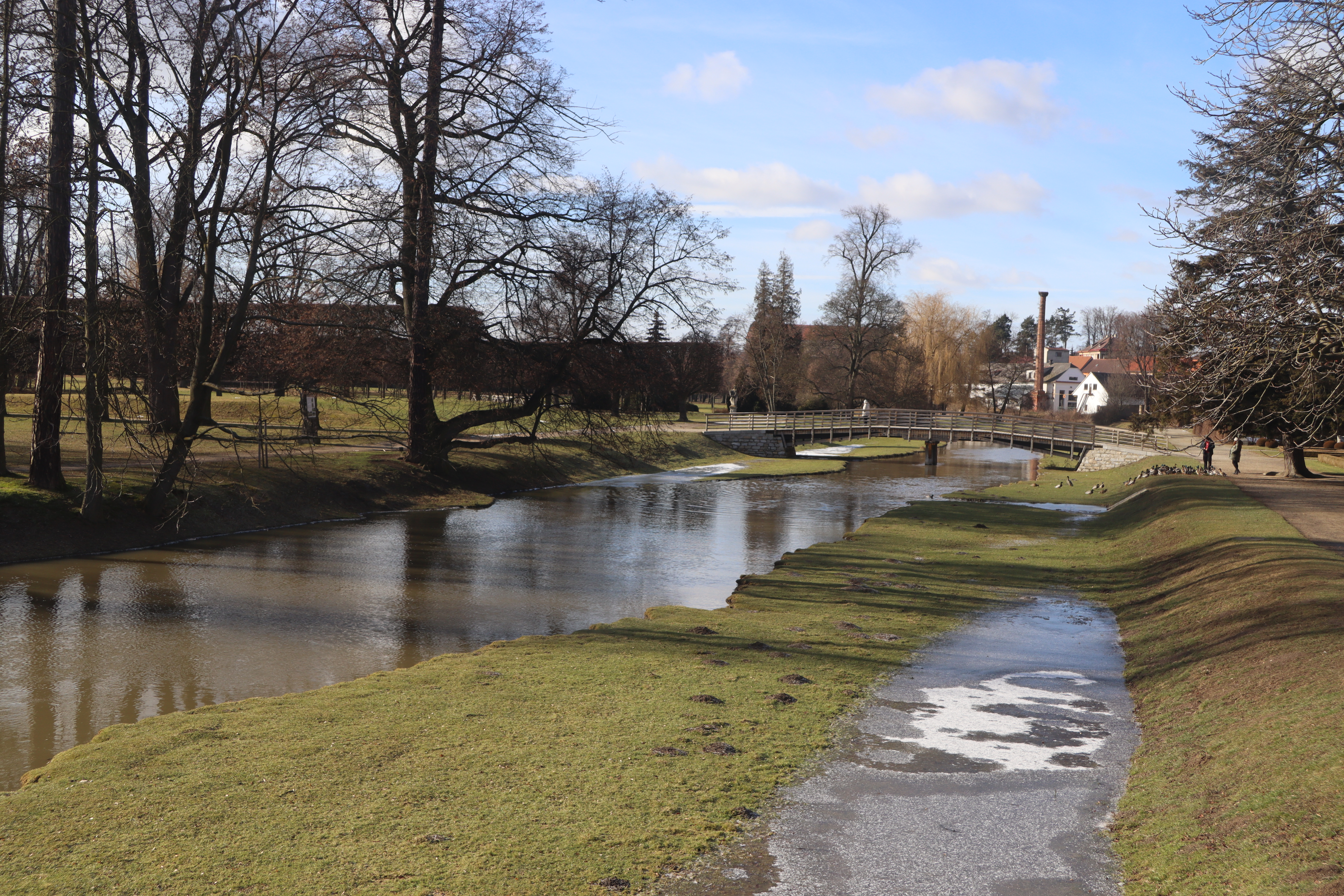
- The Rokytná in Jaroměřice nad Rokytnou

Location
- Country: Czech Republic
- Regions: Vysočina; South Moravian

Physical characteristics
- Source
  - location: Chlístov, Jevišovice Uplands
  - coordinates: 49°11′51″N 15°44′38″E
  - elevation: 573 m (1,880 ft)
- Mouth
  - location: Jihlava
  - coordinates: 49°5′49″N 16°23′0″E
  - elevation: 202 m (663 ft)
- Length: 88.2 km (54.8 mi)
- Basin size: 584.3 km^{2} (225.6 sq mi)
- Discharge
  - average: 1.38 m^{3}/s (49 cu ft/s) near estuary

Basin features
- Progression: Jihlava→ Svratka→ Thaya→ Morava→ Danube→ Black Sea

The Rokytná (Czech pronunciation: [ˈrokɪtnaː]) is a river in the Czech Republic, a right tributary of the Jihlava River. It flows through the Vysočina and South Moravian regions. It is 88.2 km (54.8 mi) long.

== Etymology ==
The name is derived from the old Czech word rakyta, i.e. 'willow'.

== Characteristic ==
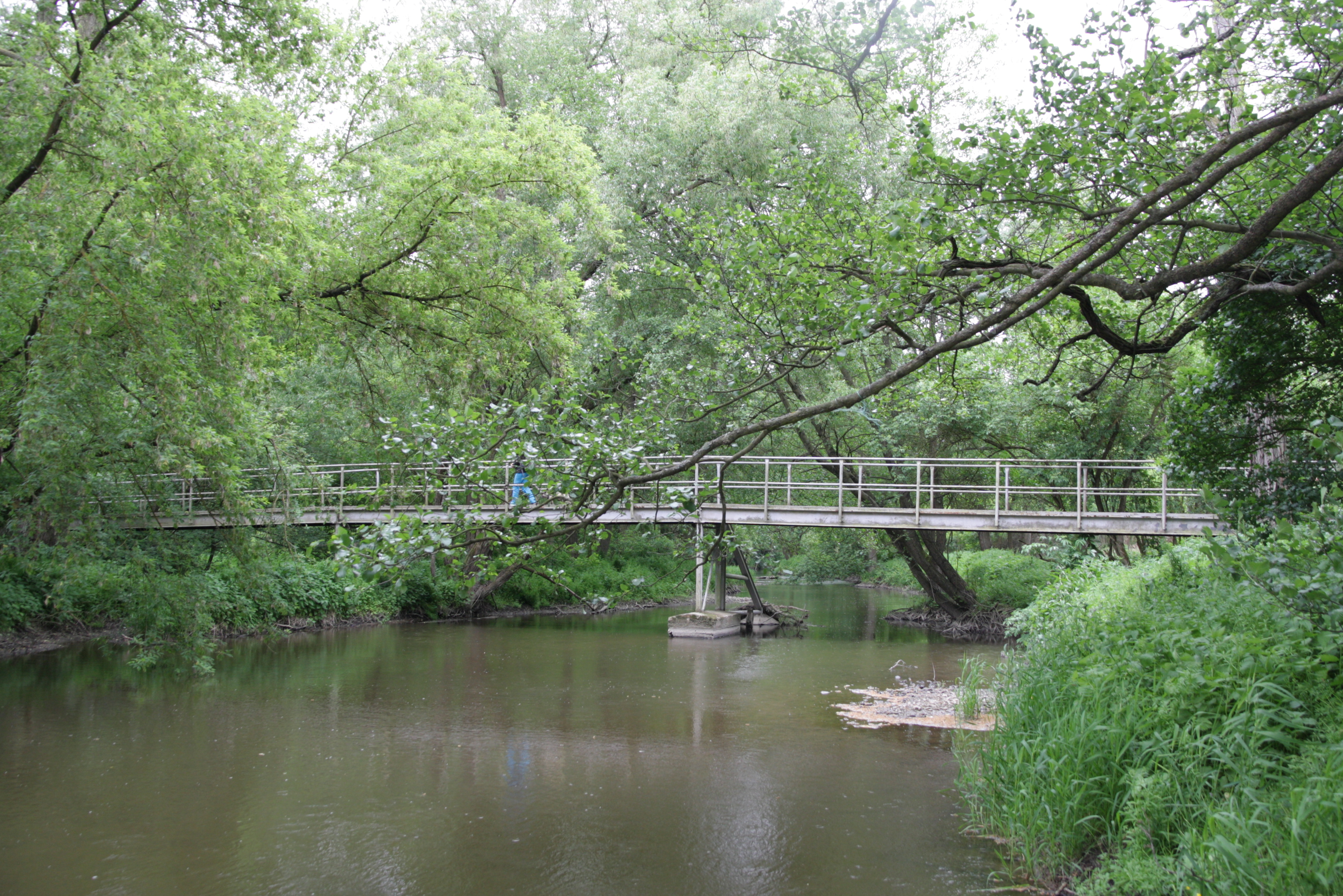
The Rokytná in Ivančice-Budkovice

The Rokytná originates in the territory of Chlístov in the Jevišovice Uplands at an elevation of 573 m (1,880 ft) and flows to Ivančice, where it enters the Jihlava River at an elevation of 202 m (663 ft). It is 88.2 km (54.8 mi) long. Its drainage basin has an area of 584.3 km^{2} (225.6 sq mi).

The longest tributaries of the Rokytná are:

Tributary	Length (km)	Side
Rouchovanka	28.1	left
Rokytka	22.1	right
Olešná	20.5	left
Dobřínský potok	12.3	left
Římovka	12.0	right
Šebkovický potok	11.5	right
Štěpánovický potok	10.5	left

== Course ==
The most notable settlements on the river are the towns of Ivančice and Moravský Krumlov. The river flows through the municipal territories of Chlístov, Rokytnice nad Rokytnou, Kojetice, Horní Újezd, Šebkovice, Lesůňky, Jaroměřice nad Rokytnou, Příštpo, Radkovice u Hrotovic, Biskupice-Pulkov, Újezd, Litovany, Přešovice, Tavíkovice, Rouchovany, Horní Kounice, Rešice, Čermákovice, Tulešice, Vémyslice, Rybníky, Moravský Krumlov and Ivančice.

== Bodies of water ==
There are 278 bodies of water in the basin area. The largest of them is the fishpond Nový u háje with an area of 26 ha (64 acres), built directly on the Rokytka. There are also five other fishponds built on the river, including a system of four small ponds near the source of the river.

== Nature ==
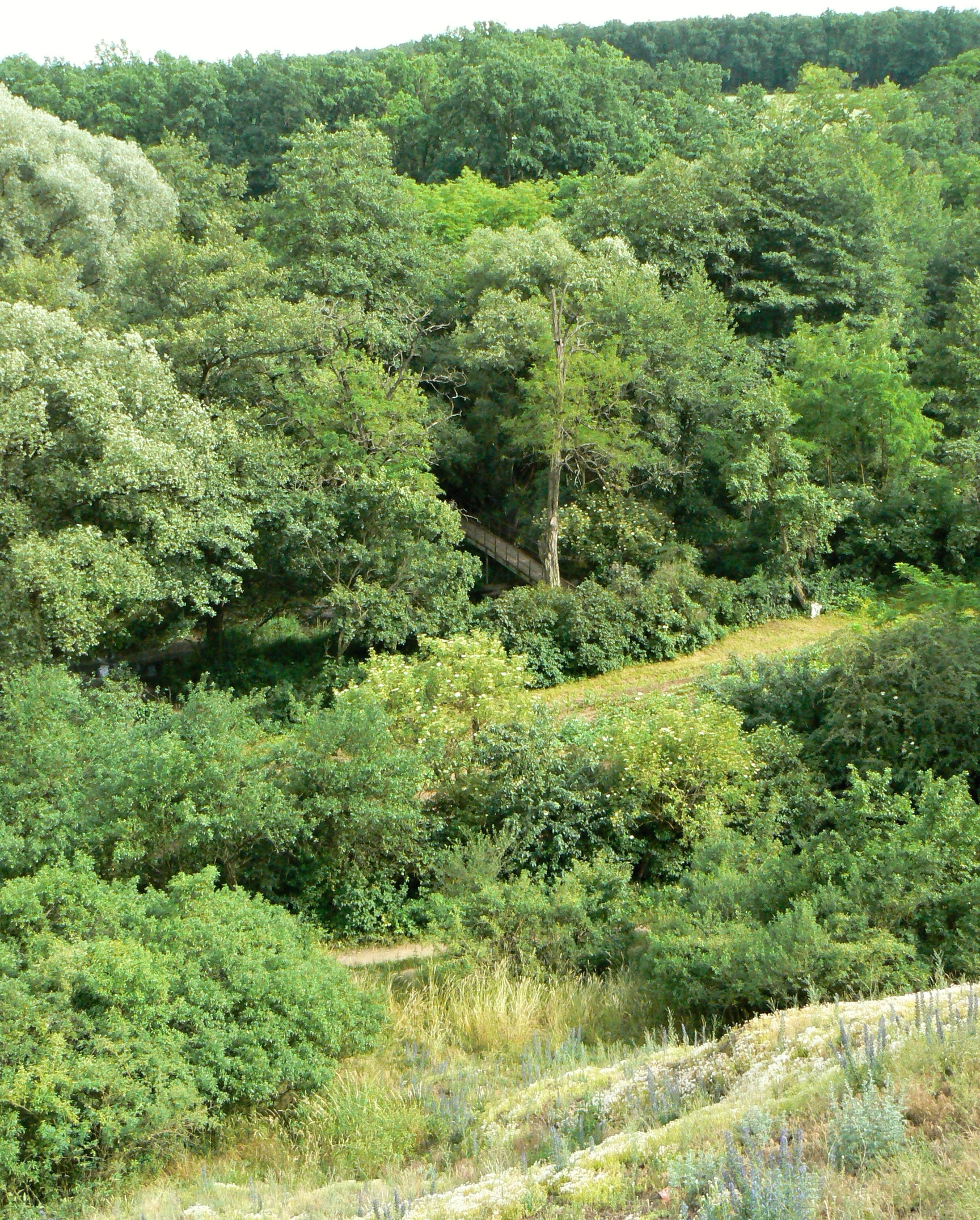
The Rokytná in the Krumlovsko-rokytenské slepence National Nature Reserve

The middle course of the river is protected within the Rokytná Nature Park with an area of 5,320 ha (13,100 acres). The object of protection is a well-preserved landscape with a meandering river and dense forest on the banks. Among the protected animals found here are the European crayfish, common kingfisher and white-throated dipper.

In the western edge of the nature park, there is a specially designated nature reserve called Jedlový les a údolí Rokytné, which is also a Special Area of Conservation. It has an area of 47.6 ha (118 acres). The object of protection is the river valley with the forests and the animal species bound to them.

On the lower course of the Rokytná is the Krumlovsko-rokytenské slepence National Nature Reserve. It has an area of 86.6 ha (214 acres). It is geomorphologically and microclimatically the most valuable part of the valley of the Rokytná, located in the Permian conglomerates. There are species-rich plant and animal communities here, bound to rocks, forest steppes, forests and river, including rare and endangered species of plants and animals.

== See also ==
- List of rivers of the Czech Republic
