= Horní Újezd (Třebíč District) =

- Municipality
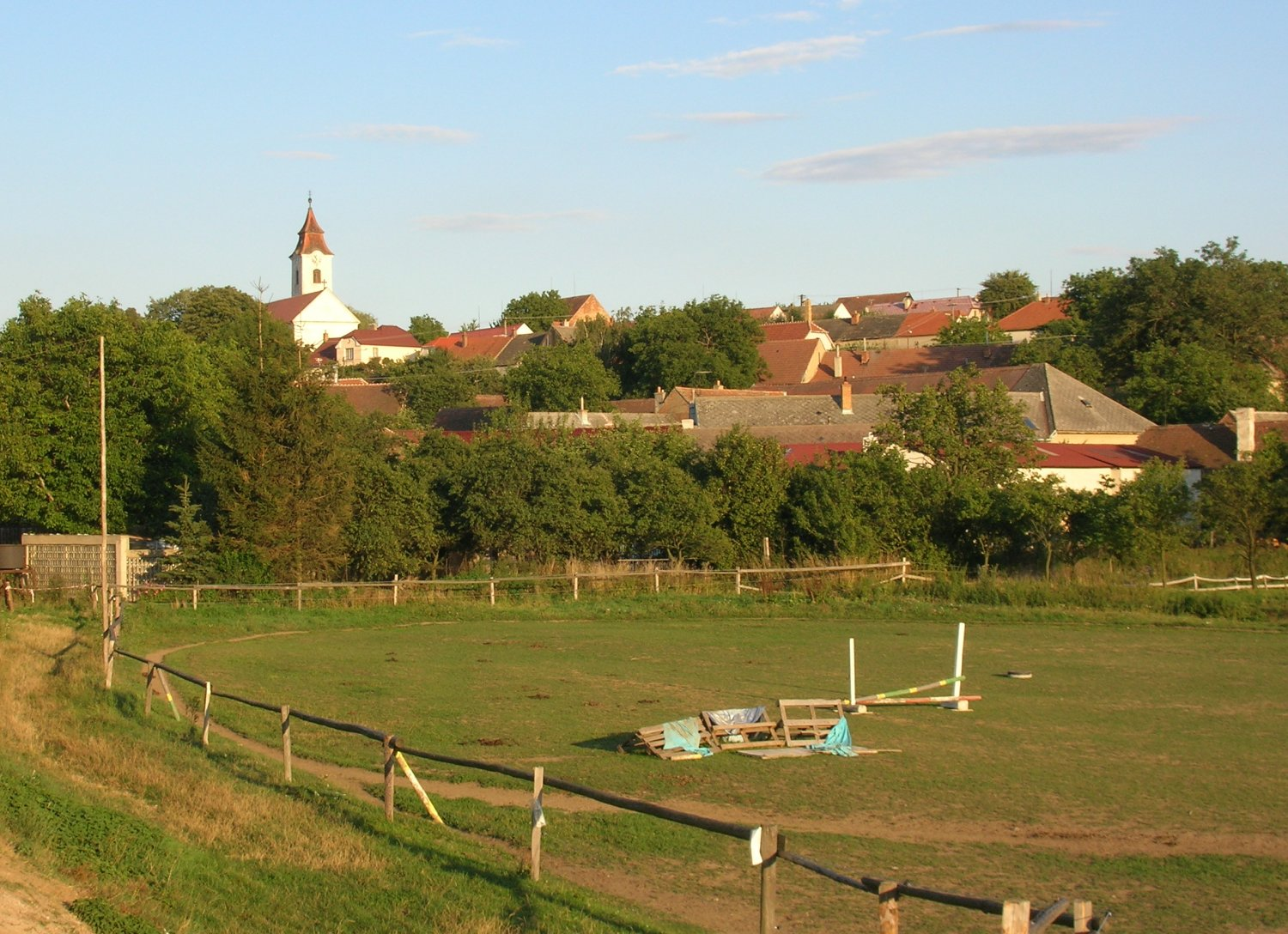
- View from the west

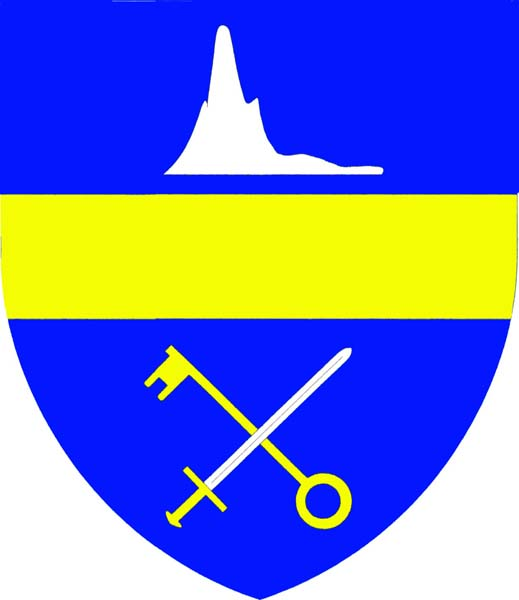
- Flag Coat of arms

- Location in the Czech Republic
- Coordinates: 49°8′34″N 15°50′32″E
- Country: Czech Republic
- Region: Vysočina
- District: Třebíč
- First mentioned: 1243

Area
  - Total: 7.16 km^{2} (2.76 sq mi)
- Elevation: 490 m (1,610 ft)

Population (2026-01-01)
  - Total: 247
  - Density: 34.5/km^{2} (89.3/sq mi)
- Time zone: UTC+1 (CET)
  - Summer (DST): UTC+2 (CEST)
- Postal code: 675 22
- Website: www.horni-ujezd.com

Horní Újezd is a municipality and village in Třebíč District in the Vysočina Region of the Czech Republic. It has about 200 inhabitants.

== Geography ==
Horní Újezd is located about 8 kilometres (5 mi) south of Třebíč and 33 km (21 mi) southeast of Jihlava. It lies in a mostly agricultural landscape in the Jevišovice Uplands. The highest point is at 553 m (1,814 ft) above sea level. The Rokytná River flows along the western municipal border.

== History ==
The first written mention of Újezd is from 1243. It was held by various noble families; among the most notable owners of the village were the Pernštejn family. Újezd was renamed Horní Újezd in the first half of the 19th century to distinguish from Velký Újezd (today part of Kojatice).

== Demographics ==
Historical population

Year	Pop.	±%
1869	417	—
1880	424	+1.7%
1890	425	+0.2%
1900	437	+2.8%
1910	441	+0.9%

Year	Pop.	±%
1921	419	−5.0%
1930	447	+6.7%
1950	346	−22.6%
1961	364	+5.2%
1970	361	−0.8%

Year	Pop.	±%
1980	343	−5.0%
1991	284	−17.2%
2001	267	−6.0%
2011	274	+2.6%
2021	260	−5.1%

Source: Censuses

== Transport ==
The railway line Znojmo–Okříšky runs through the municipal territory, but there is no train station. The municipality is served by the station in neighbouring Kojetice.

== Sights ==
The main landmark of Horní Újezd is the Church of the Saints Peter and Paul. It is a Gothic church with a Romanesque core from the 13th century. The façade was modified in the Neoclassical style.
