= Moravský Krumlov =

- Town
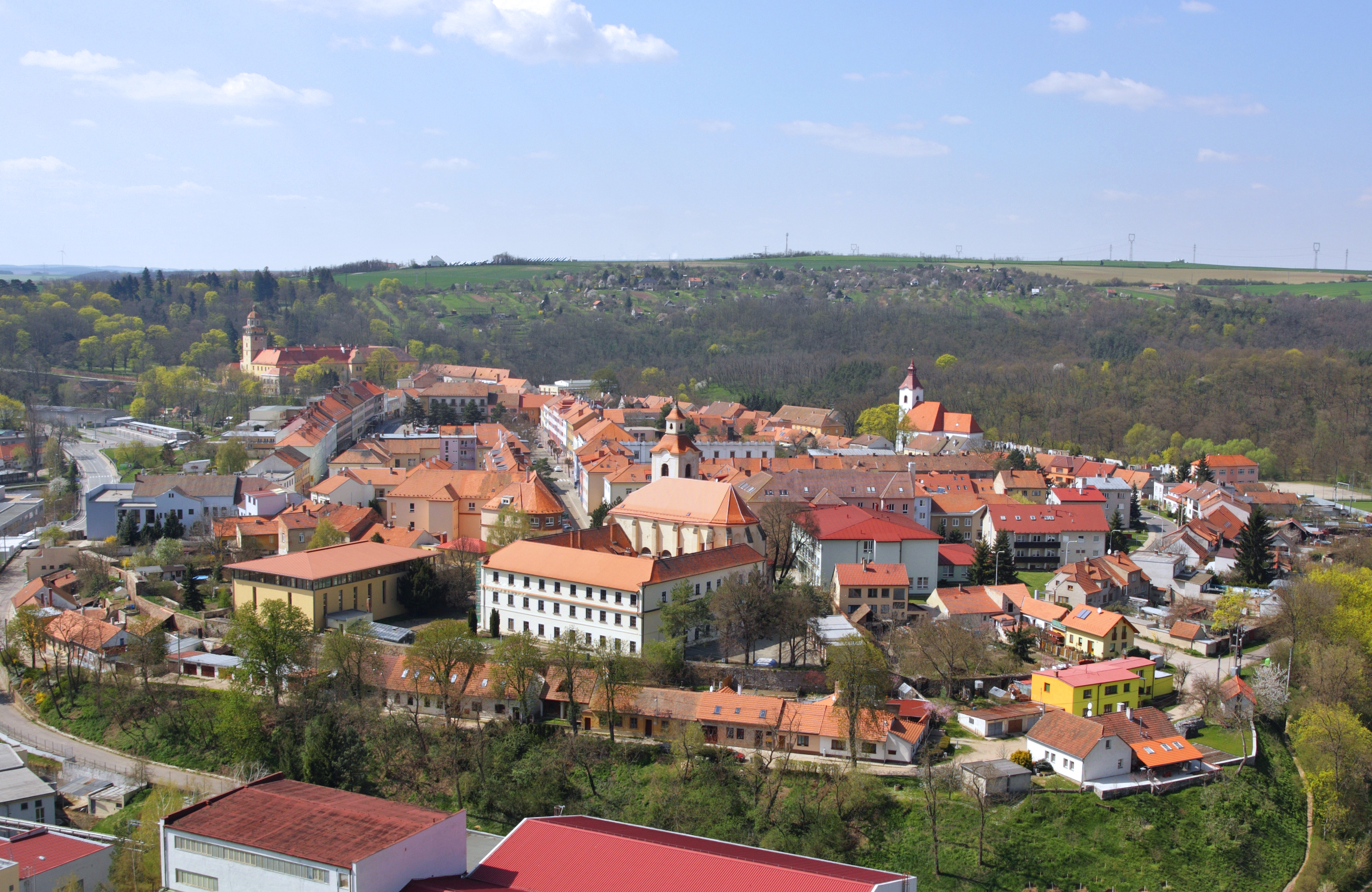
- Historic centre of Moravský Krumlov

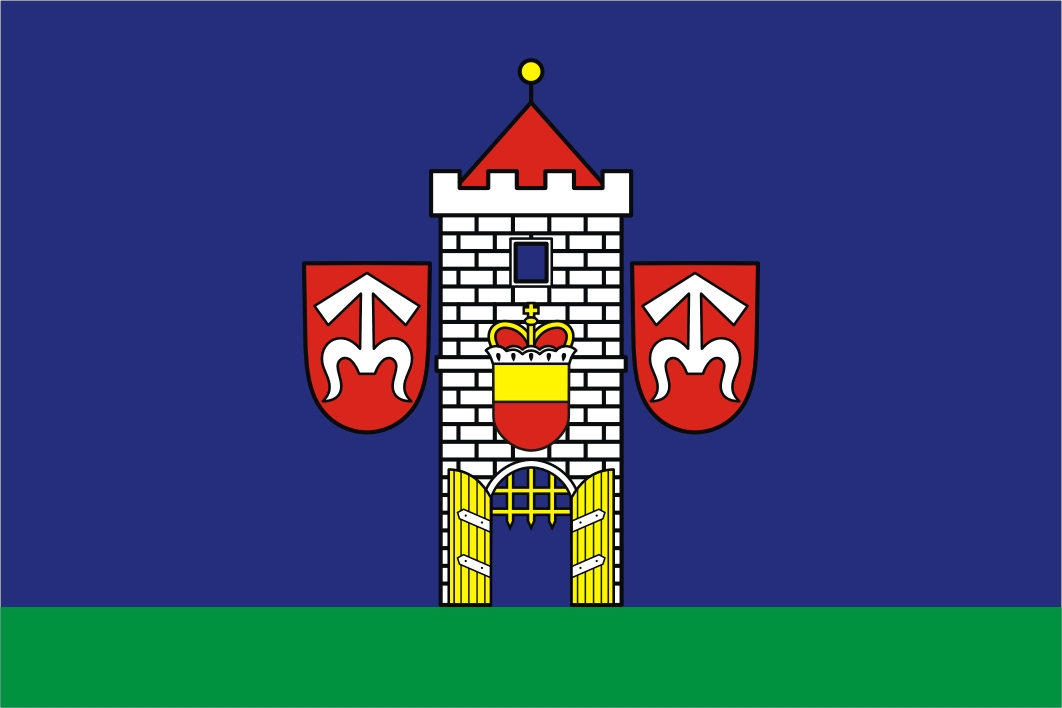
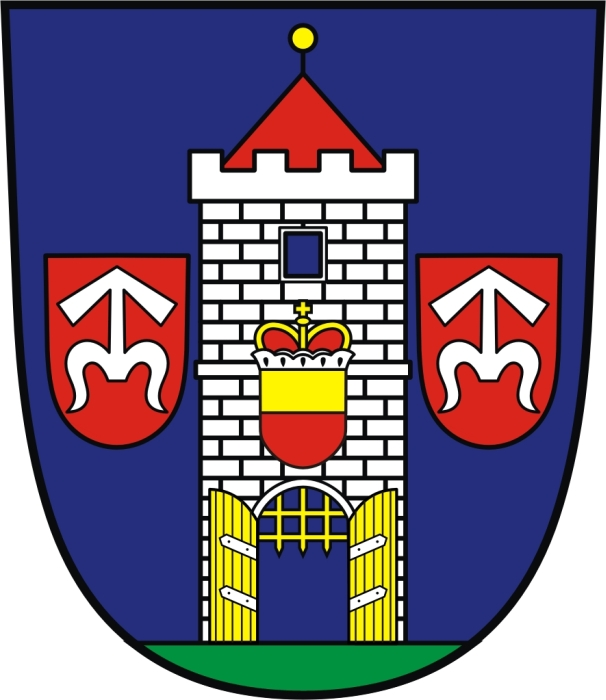
- Flag Coat of arms

- Location in the Czech Republic
- Coordinates: 49°2′56″N 16°18′42″E
- Country: Czech Republic
- Region: South Moravian
- District: Znojmo
- First mentioned: 1289

Government
  - Mayor: Zdeněk Juránek (KDU-ČSL)

Area
  - Total: 49.56 km^{2} (19.14 sq mi)
- Elevation: 255 m (837 ft)

Population (2026-01-01)
  - Total: 5,635
  - Density: 113.7/km^{2} (294.5/sq mi)
- Time zone: UTC+1 (CET)
  - Summer (DST): UTC+2 (CEST)
- Postal code: 672 01
- Website: www.mkrumlov.cz

Moravský Krumlov (Czech pronunciation: [ˈmorafskiː ˈkrumlof]; German: Mährisch Kromau) is a town in Znojmo District in the South Moravian Region of the Czech Republic. It has about 5,600 inhabitants. The Rokytná River flows through the town.

Moravský Krumlov was founded in the 13th century. The historic town centre is well preserved and is protected as an urban monument zone. The Renaissance building of the Moravský Krumlov Castle is the main landmark of the town.

== Administrative division ==
Moravský Krumlov consists of four municipal parts (in brackets population according to the 2021 census):

- Moravský Krumlov (4,256)
- Polánka (483)
- Rakšice (759)
- Rokytná (155)

== Etymology ==
Krumlov is named after a meander of the Rokytná River. It has its origin in Middle High German Krumme Aue, which can be translated as crooked meadow. The adjective Moravský ('Moravian'; in German Mährisch Kromau) was added in 1661 to differentiate it from the town of Český Krumlov in Bohemia.

== Geography ==
Moravský Krumlov is located about 28 kilometres (17 mi) northeast of Znojmo and 25 km (16 mi) southwest of Brno. The municipal territory lies in three geomorphological regions. The central part with the town proper lies in the Boskovice Furrow. The western part extends into the Jevišovice Uplands. The eastern part with the forested hills lies in the Bobrava Highlands and includes the highest point of the territory, the hill U Stavení at 415 m (1,362 ft) above sea level. The Rokytná River flows through the town.

== History ==
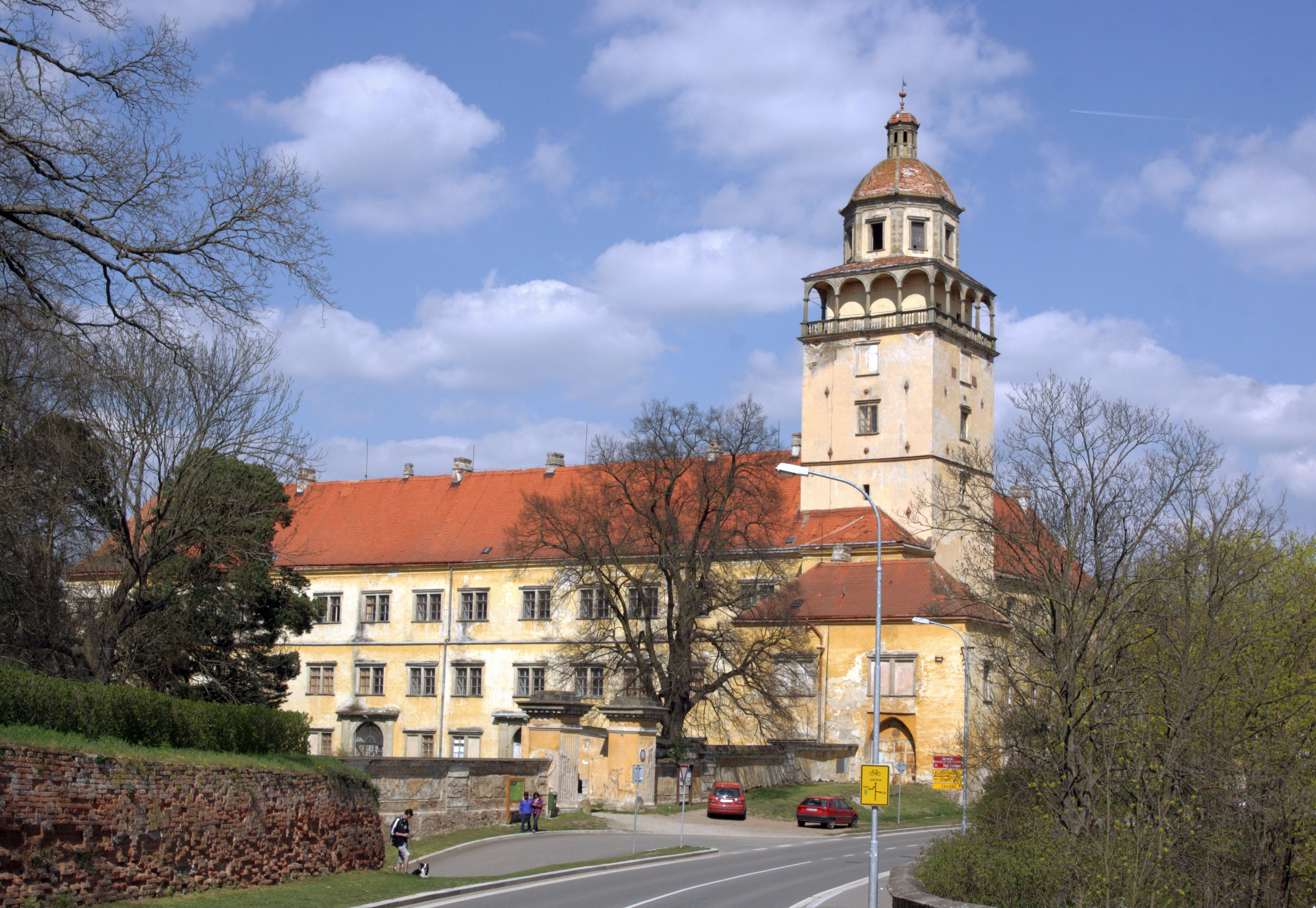
Moravský Krumlov Castle

The foundation of the town is connected with the construction of a stone castle, which was probably initiated by order of Ottokar II of Bohemia. The first written mention about Moravský Krumlov is however from 1289. Between 1313 and 1315, the estate was acquired by the Lords of Lipá. In 1354, an Augustinian monastery was founded here. In 1358, the town was acquired by the Lords of Kravaře.

During the Hussite Wars, the town was occupied by the Hussites and served as their military base. After the wars, the lords of Lipá regained the town. In the 16th century, the old castle was rebuilt into a comfortable Renaissance residence, and became a significant centre of cultural and social events. As lords of Lipá belonged to the losing side in the revolt against the emperor, the estate was confiscated and in 1622 sold to the House of Liechtenstein. During the Thirty Years' War in 1645, the town was occupied by the Swedish army, which looted the town and devastated the castle.

During the Napoleonic Wars, Moravský Krumlov was twice occupied by Napoleon and his soldiers. The town took a long time to recover from the consequences of the wars. During the first half of the 19th century, the town has lost its political, economic and cultural significance. The economic growth began after the construction of the Brno–Znojmo railway in 1871, although it was 2 kilometres (1 mi) away.

From the 1880s, ethnic conflicts began to escalate in Moravský Krumlov. The ethnic Germans formed about two thirds of the population. In 1908, the Kinsky family inherited the castle. In 1938, the majority of the Czech and Jewish population was forced to leave the town. On the last night of World War II (7 May 1945), the town was heavily bombed by Soviet air forces. As a result, three quarters of the town lay in ruins. The castle and the parish church were among the buildings that survived without major damage. In 1945, properties of the Kinsky family were confiscated and castle interiors were looted.

== Demographics ==
Historical population

Year	Pop.	±%
1869	3,020	—
1880	3,215	+6.5%
1890	3,398	+5.7%
1900	3,763	+10.7%
1910	3,833	+1.9%

Year	Pop.	±%
1921	4,177	+9.0%
1930	4,200	+0.6%
1950	3,784	−9.9%
1961	4,516	+19.3%
1970	4,602	+1.9%

Year	Pop.	±%
1980	5,590	+21.5%
1991	6,103	+9.2%
2001	6,102	−0.0%
2011	5,778	−5.3%
2021	5,653	−2.2%

Source: Censuses

== Transport ==
Moravský Krumlov is located on the railway line Brno–Bohutice. In addition to the main train station, there is also the Rakšice stop.

== Education ==
Moravský Krumlov is home to three secondary schools: Moravský Krumlov Gymnasium, Secondary School of Transport, Trade and Services Moravský Krumlov, and a secondary school operating at young detention centre. There are three primary schools and also one primary art school.

== Sights ==
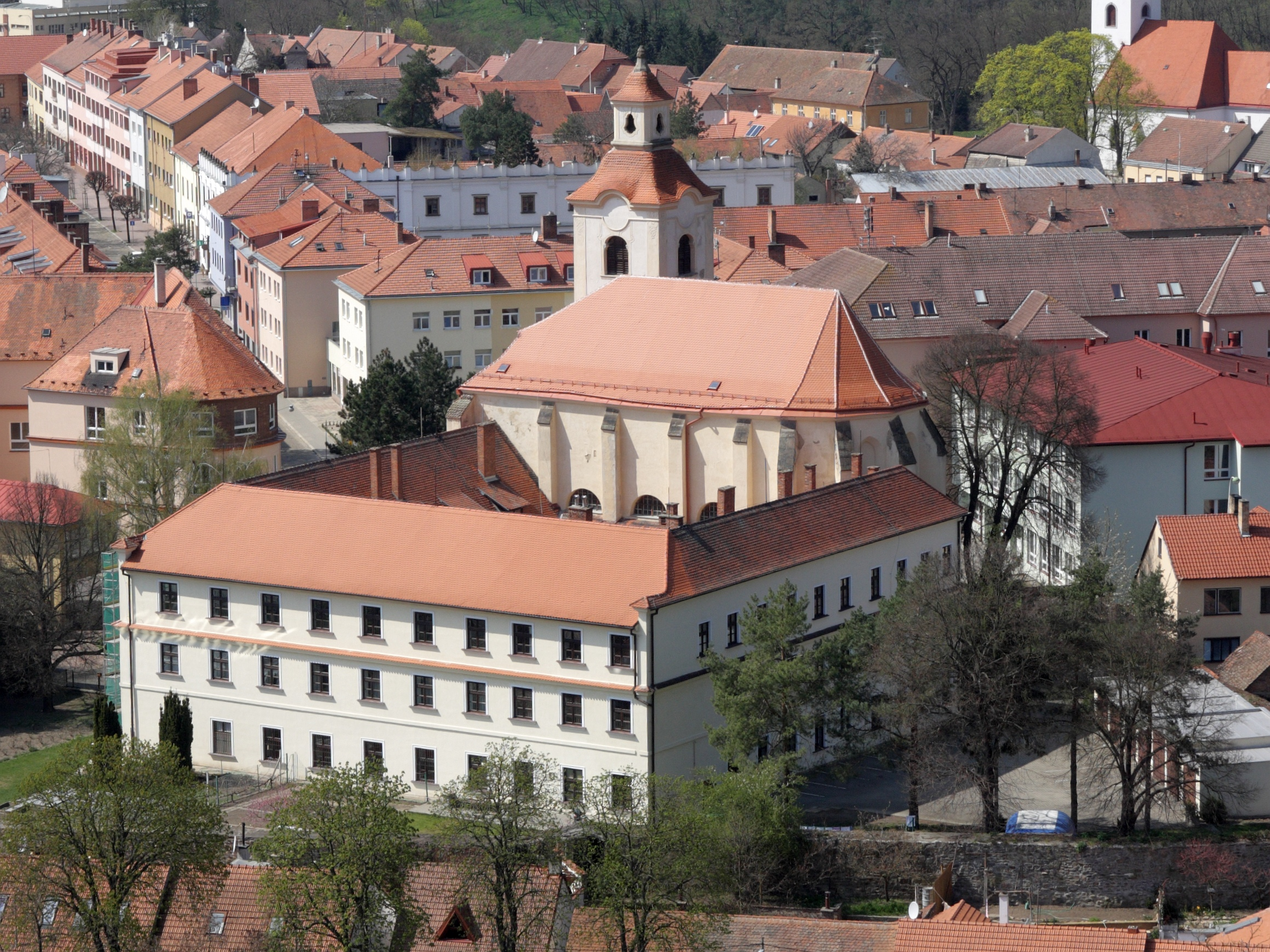
Church of Saint Bartholomew and the former monastery

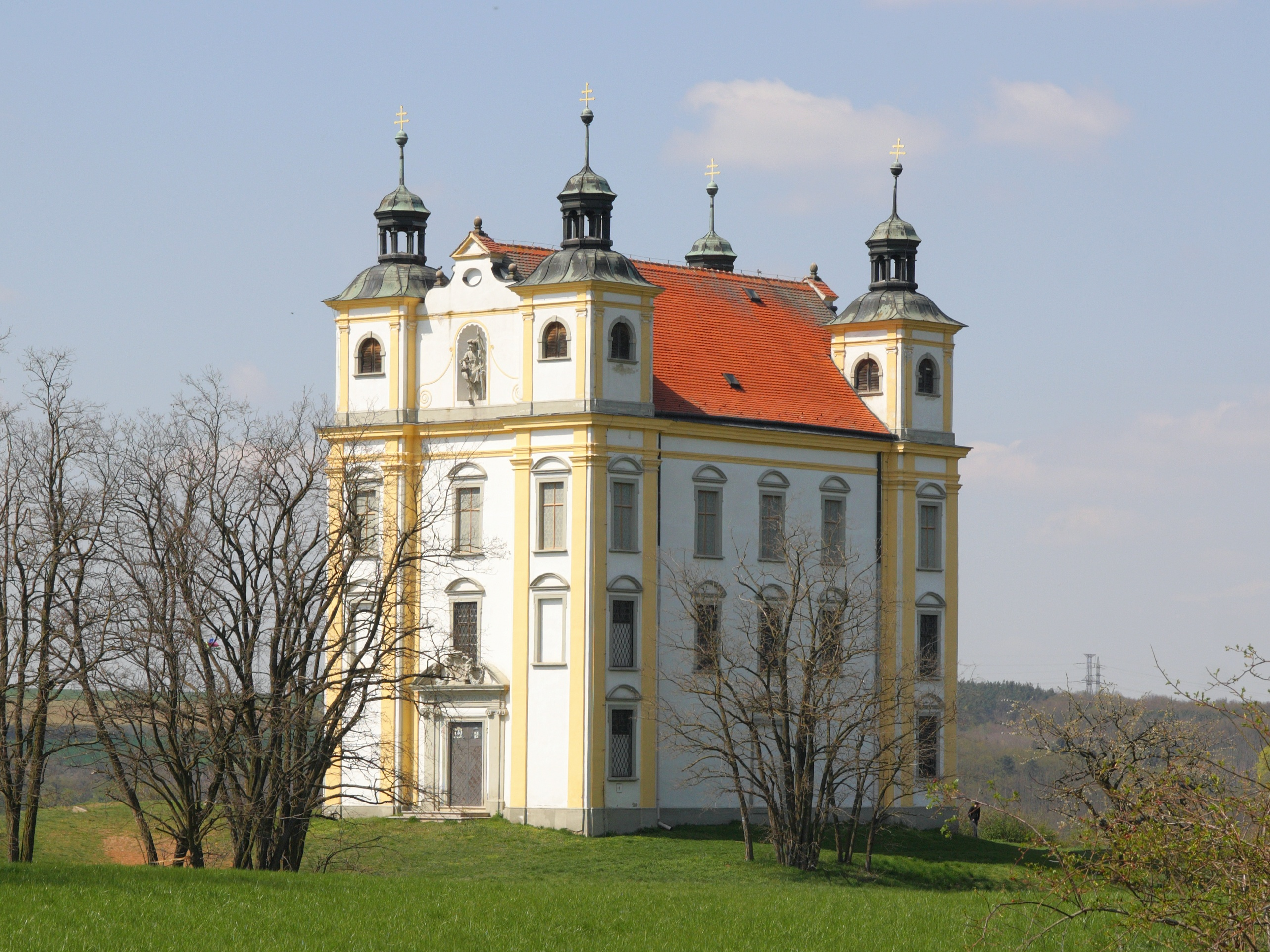
Chapel of Saint Florian

The historic centre of Moravský Krumlov is located in a meander of the Rokytná River. In the 13th century, it was delimited by town walls. Several remnants of the town walls are preserved to this day.

Moravský Krumlov Castle is the main sight of the town. In 2016, the castle in poor condition was purchased by the town and is gradually being repaired. The complex of the Renaissance castle includes stables from 1593, a castle chapel from 1762, and a castle park established in the late 18th century. Until 2011, the castle was home to the series of paintings by Alphonse Mucha known as The Slav Epic. Since 2021, The Slav Epic has been again exhibited in the newly reconstructed part of the castle.

The monastery complex was destroyed by a large fire in 1682. It was reconstructed in the Baroque style in 1701, only several Gothic fragments of the church were preserved. The monastery was abolished in the late 18th century. Today it serves as a town hall. The monastery Church of Saint Bartholomew serves religious purposes to this day.

The Church of All Saints is the oldest religious building in the town. It was built in 1248 and originally consecrated to Saint Lawrence. After it was damaged during the Thirty Years' War, it was rebuilt in 1646. Baroque modifications were made in 1785. Next to the church is the Neoclassical tomb of the local branch of the Liechtenstein family from 1789.

The Chapel of Saint Florian on a hill above the town is one of the landmarks of Moravský Krumlov. The Baroque chapel was built in 1697 and consecrated to patron saint of the town. Since 1989, it has been again a pilgrimage site.

== Notable people ==
- Jan IV of Pernštejn (1487–1548), nobleman
- Vojtěch I of Pernštejn (1490–1534), nobleman
- Heinrich Glücksmann (1864–1947), Austrian writer
- Drahomíra Vihanová (1930–2017), film director, documentarian and screenwriter
- Petr Málek (1961–2019), sport shooter, Olympic medalist
- Vladimír Morávek (born 1965), film director, screenwriter and actor

== Twin towns – sister cities ==
Moravský Krumlov is twinned with:

- Przeworsk, Poland
