= Rouchovany =

- Municipality
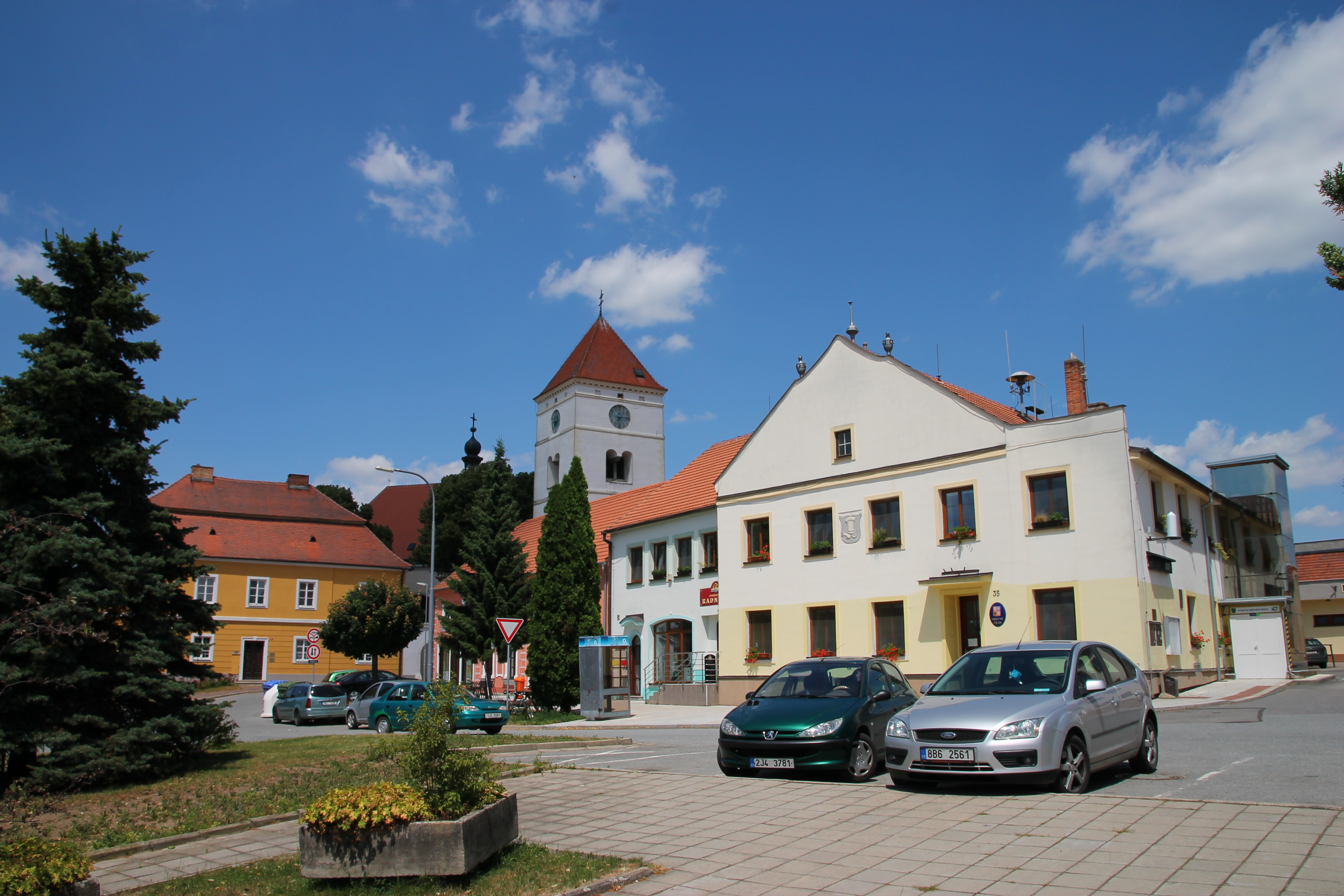
- Centre of Rouchovany

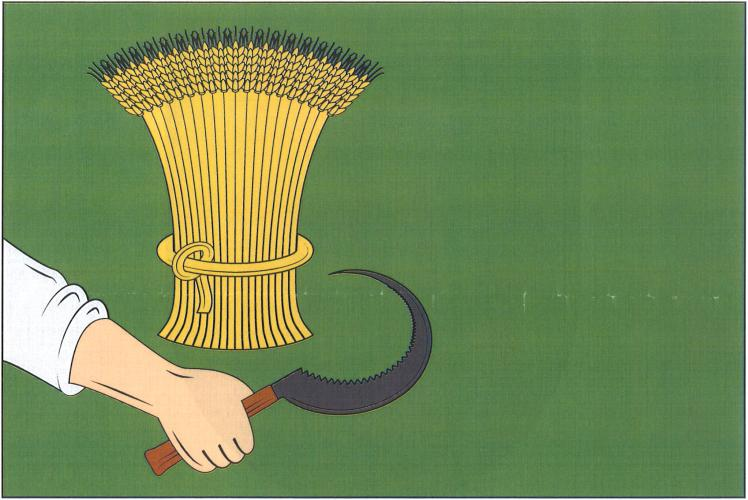
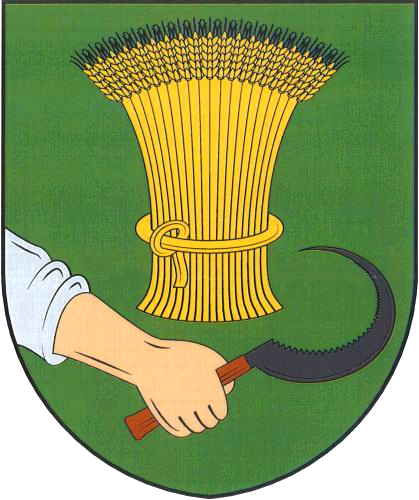
- Flag Coat of arms

- Location in the Czech Republic
- Coordinates: 49°4′13″N 16°6′27″E
- Country: Czech Republic
- Region: Vysočina
- District: Třebíč
- First mentioned: 1243

Area
  - Total: 24.77 km^{2} (9.56 sq mi)
- Elevation: 360 m (1,180 ft)

Population (2026-01-01)
  - Total: 1,213
  - Density: 48.97/km^{2} (126.8/sq mi)
- Time zone: UTC+1 (CET)
  - Summer (DST): UTC+2 (CEST)
- Postal code: 675 57
- Website: www.rouchovany.cz

Rouchovany is a municipality and village in Třebíč District in the Vysočina Region of the Czech Republic. It has about 1,200 inhabitants.

== Administrative division ==
Rouchovany consists of two municipal parts (in brackets population according to the 2021 census):

- Rouchovany (1,043)
- Šemíkovice (75)

== Geography ==
Rouchovany is located about 23 kilometres (14 mi) southeast of Třebíč and 38 km (24 mi) southwest of Brno. It lies in the Jevišovice Uplands. The highest point is the hill Cibuluška at 418 m (1,371 ft) above sea level. The Rouchovanka Stream flows through the municipality. The Rokytná River, to which the Rouchovanka is going, flows along the southern municipal border.

== History ==
The first written mention of Rouchovany is from 1243. In 1353, it was referred to as a market town. In 1468, the village was officially promoted to a market town, but it later lost the title. Between 1458 and 1471, Rouchovany was acquired by the Pernštejn family. Vilém II of Pernštejn gave Rouchovany as a dowry to his daughter, and thus they came into the hands of the Lords of Lipá. They owned it until the Battle of White Mountain in 1620, when their properties were confiscated.

From 1622 until the establishment of an independent municipality in 1848, Rouchovany was a property of the Liechtenstein family. During their rule, the importance of the settlement declined. In 1805, most of Rouchovany was destroyed by a large fire.

== Demographics ==
Historical population

Year	Pop.	±%
1869	1,393	—
1880	1,376	−1.2%
1890	1,353	−1.7%
1900	1,473	+8.9%
1910	1,454	−1.3%

Year	Pop.	±%
1921	1,547	+6.4%
1930	1,573	+1.7%
1950	1,303	−17.2%
1961	1,353	+3.8%
1970	1,252	−7.5%

Year	Pop.	±%
1980	1,201	−4.1%
1991	1,098	−8.6%
2001	1,101	+0.3%
2011	1,146	+4.1%
2021	1,118	−2.4%

Source: Censuses

== Economy ==
Part of the Dukovany Nuclear Power Station lies in the municipal territory.

== Transport ==
There are no railways (except for the spur line for the needs of the nuclear power station) or major roads passing through the municipality.

== Sights ==
The main landmark is the Church of the Assumption of the Virgin Mary. It is an early Baroque building with a Romanesque core. Next to the church is an architecturally valuable separate bell tower, built in the Romanesque-Renaissance style in 1585–1610.
