= Chlístov (Třebíč District) =

- Municipality
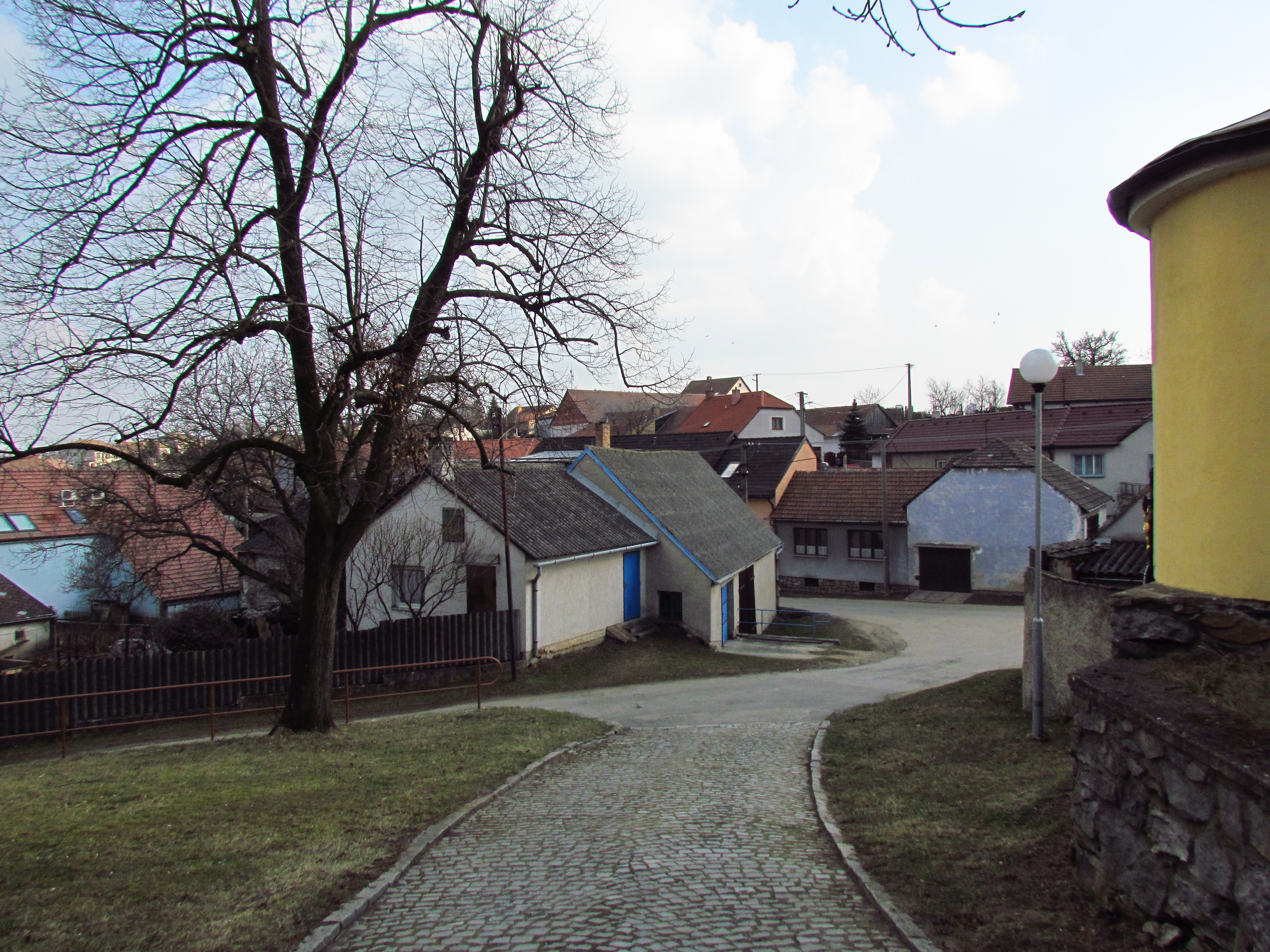
- Centre of Chlístov

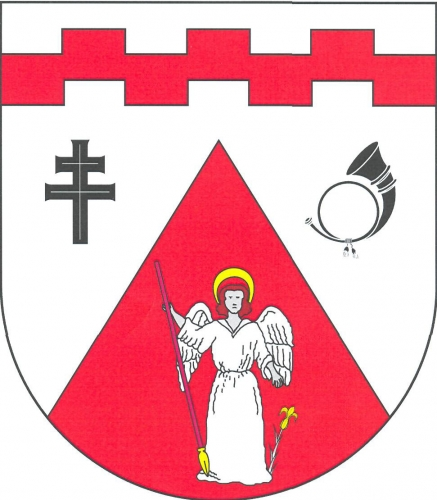
- Flag Coat of arms

- Location in the Czech Republic
- Coordinates: 49°12′8″N 15°44′37″E
- Country: Czech Republic
- Region: Vysočina
- District: Třebíč
- First mentioned: 1353

Area
  - Total: 3.77 km^{2} (1.46 sq mi)
- Elevation: 568 m (1,864 ft)

Population (2026-01-01)
  - Total: 306
  - Density: 81.2/km^{2} (210/sq mi)
- Time zone: UTC+1 (CET)
  - Summer (DST): UTC+2 (CEST)
- Postal code: 675 22
- Website: www.chlistov.org

Chlístov is a municipality and village in Třebíč District in the Vysočina Region of the Czech Republic. It has about 300 inhabitants.

Chlístov lies approximately 11 kilometres (7 mi) west of Třebíč, 24 km (15 mi) south-east of Jihlava, and 137 km (85 mi) south-east of Prague. The Rokytná River originates in the municipal territory.

== Demographics ==
Historical population
Year	Pop.	±%
1869	322	—
1880	375	+16.5%
1890	367	−2.1%
1900	354	−3.5%
1910	335	−5.4%
1921	381	+13.7%
1930	361	−5.2%
1950	363	+0.6%
1961	365	+0.6%
1970	331	−9.3%
1980	298	−10.0%
1991	253	−15.1%
2001	229	−9.5%
2011	257	+12.2%
2021	297	+15.6%
Source: Censuses
