= Vémyslice =

- Market town
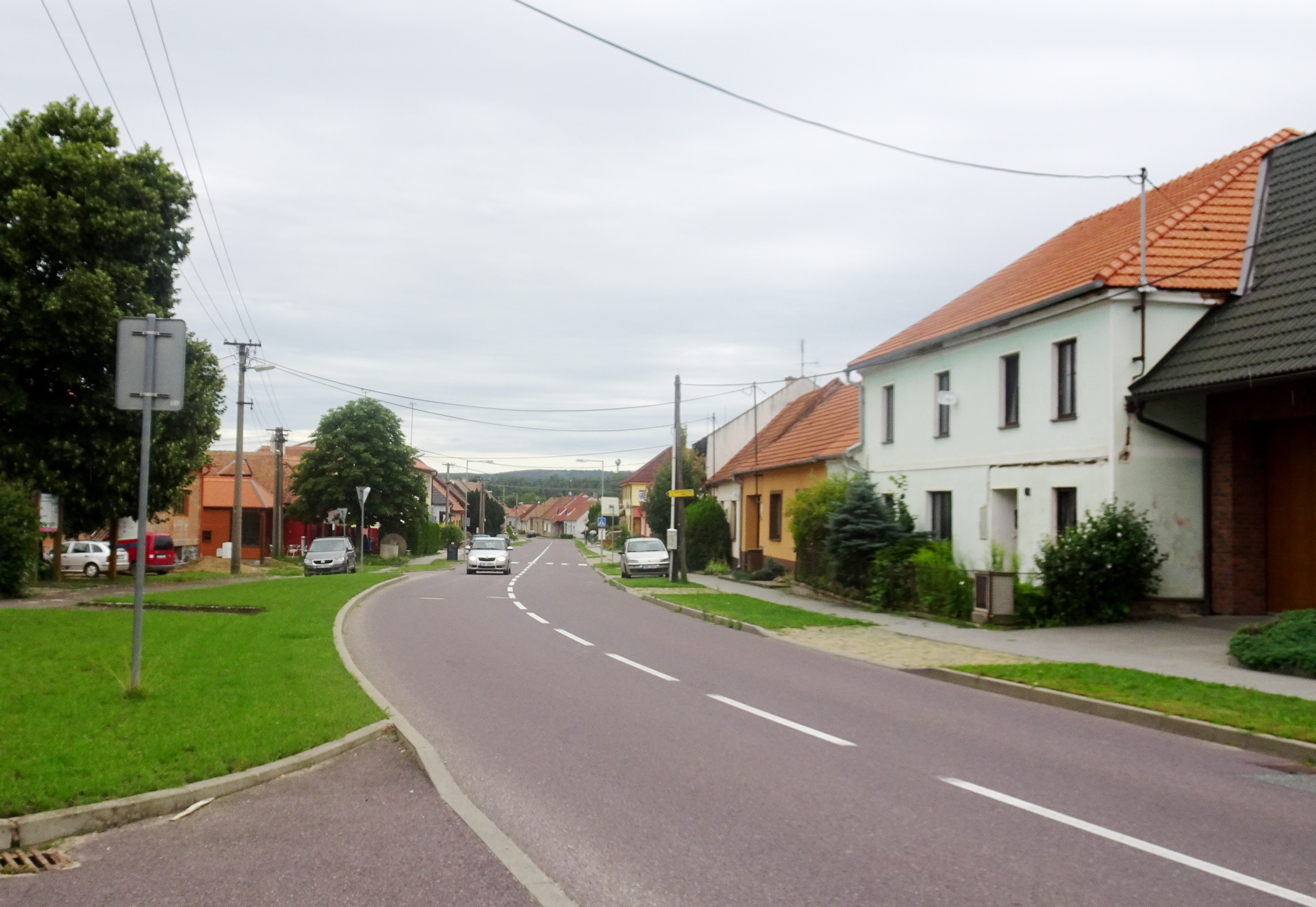
- Centre of Vémyslice

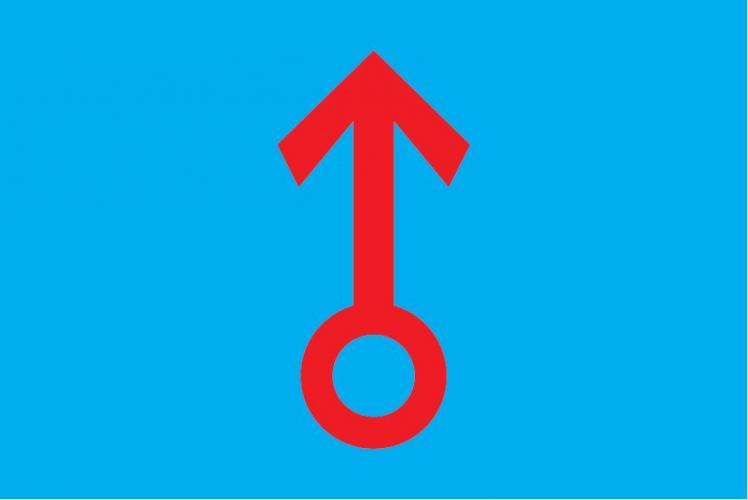
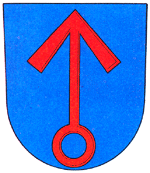
- Flag Coat of arms

- Location in the Czech Republic
- Coordinates: 49°1′19″N 16°15′24″E
- Country: Czech Republic
- Region: South Moravian
- District: Znojmo
- First mentioned: 1234

Area
  - Total: 12.33 km^{2} (4.76 sq mi)
- Elevation: 255 m (837 ft)

Population (2026-01-01)
  - Total: 687
  - Density: 55.7/km^{2} (144/sq mi)
- Time zone: UTC+1 (CET)
  - Summer (DST): UTC+2 (CEST)
- Postal code: 671 42
- Website: www.mestysvemyslice.cz

Vémyslice (Czech pronunciation: [ˈvɛːmɪslɪtsɛ]) is a market town in Znojmo District in the South Moravian Region of the Czech Republic. It has about 700 inhabitants.

== Etymology ==
The initial name of the settlement was Vojemyslice and was derived from the personal name Vojemysl. The current form of the name was created by gradual distortion. The current name has been officially used since 1925.

== Geography ==
Vémyslice is located about 23 kilometres (14 mi) northeast of Znojmo and 30 km (19 mi) southwest of Brno. It lies mostly in the Jevišovice Uplands, only the northeastern part of the municipal territory extends into the Boskovice Furrow. The highest point is the hill Tanárka at 391 m (1,283 ft) above sea level. The market town is situated on the right bank of the Rokytná River.

== History ==
The first written mention of Vémyslice is from 1234. The village was divided into two parts. The larger part was owned by the Porta coeli Convent in Tišnov and the smaller part had various owners. In 1556, Vémyslice was promoted to a market town by Emperor Ferdinand I. In 1673, most of the market town burned down.

== Demographics ==
Historical population

Year	Pop.	±%
1869	657	—
1880	773	+17.7%
1890	838	+8.4%
1900	780	−6.9%
1910	838	+7.4%

Year	Pop.	±%
1921	934	+11.5%
1930	982	+5.1%
1950	903	−8.0%
1961	928	+2.8%
1970	839	−9.6%

Year	Pop.	±%
1980	772	−8.0%
1991	742	−3.9%
2001	700	−5.7%
2011	665	−5.0%
2021	672	+1.1%

Source: Censuses

== Transport ==
There are no railways or major roads passing through the municipality.

== Sights ==
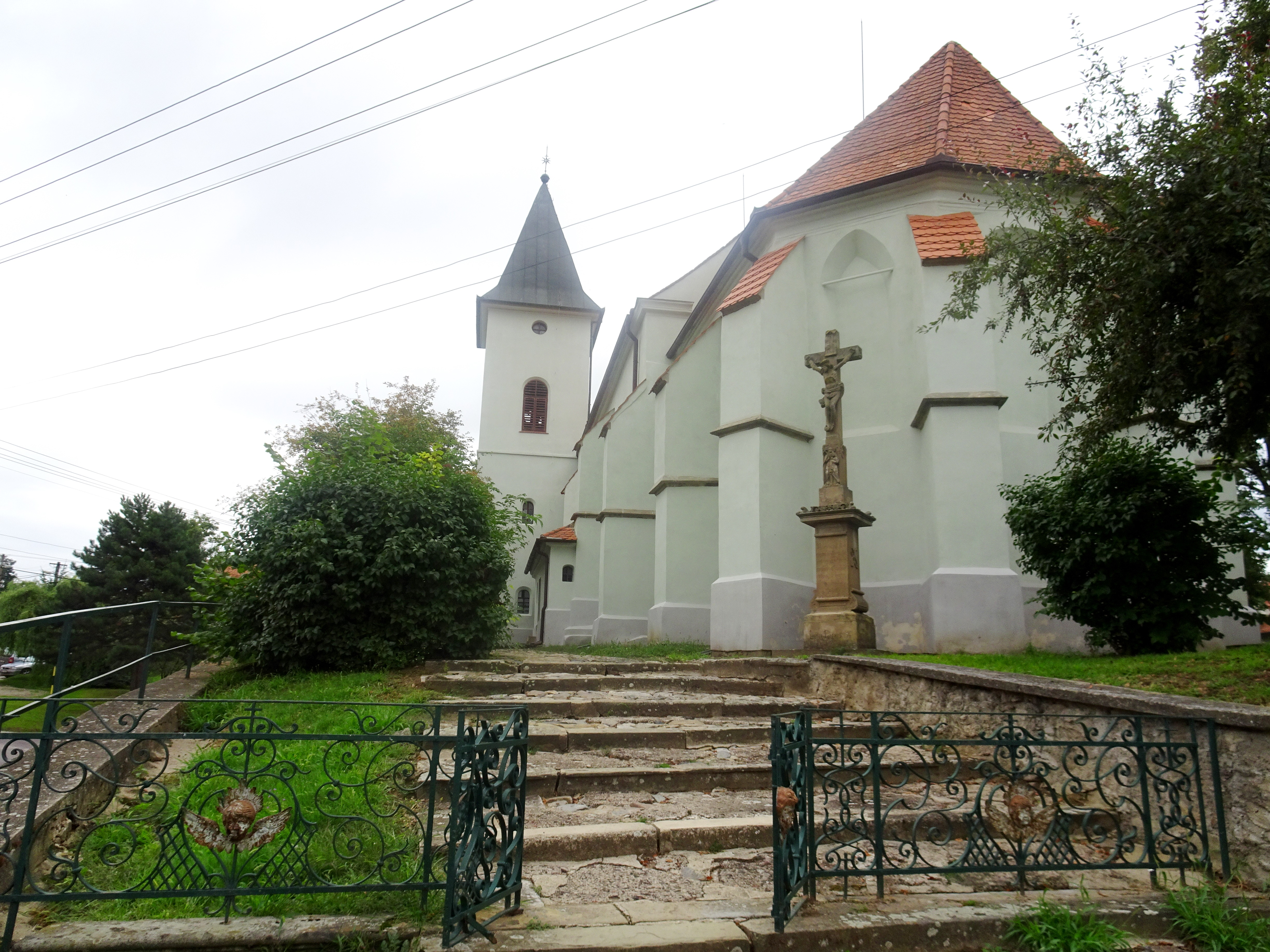
Church of the Nativity of the Virgin Mary

The main landmark of Vémyslice is the Church of the Nativity of the Virgin Mary. It was originally a Romanesque church, rebuilt in the Baroque style at the beginning of the 18th century.
