= Kojetice (Třebíč District) =

- Municipality
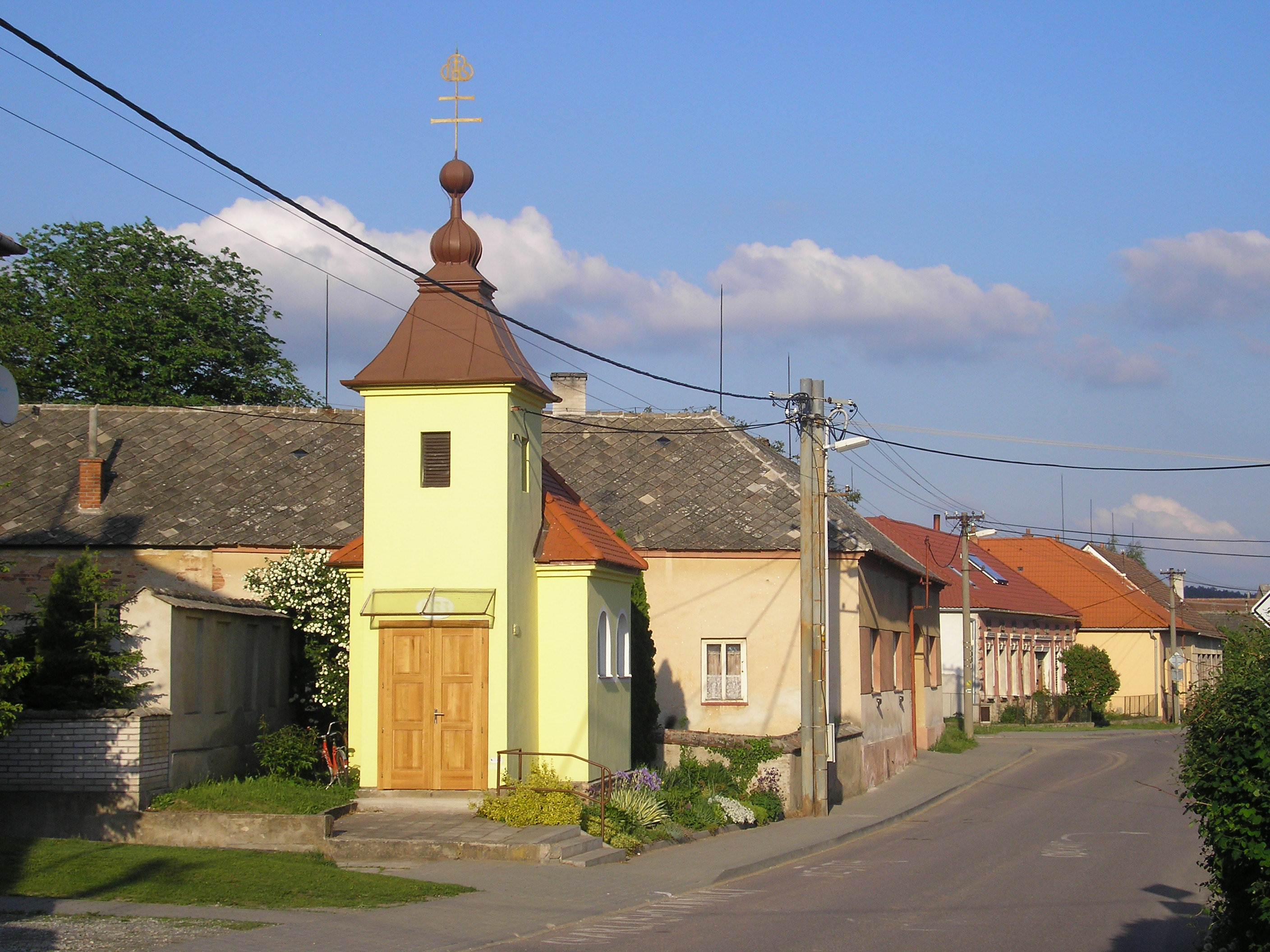
- Chapel of Saint Wenceslaus

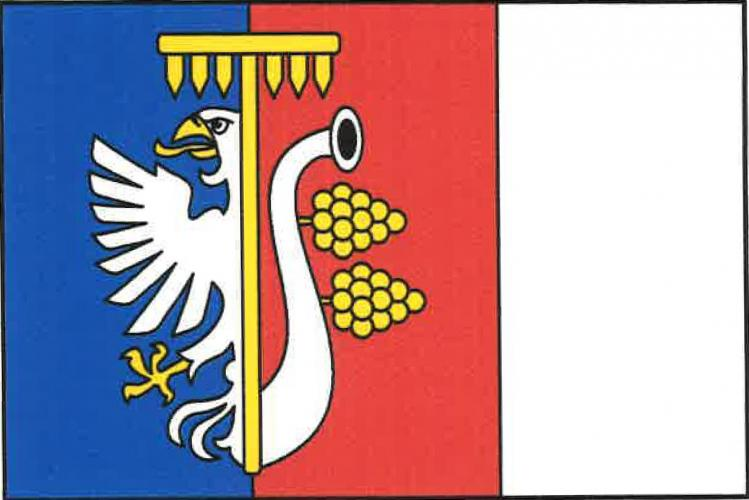
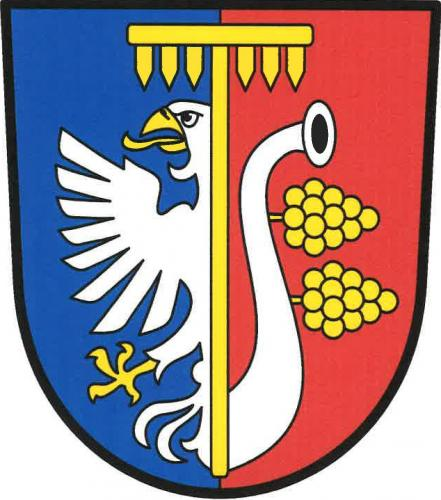
- Flag Coat of arms

- Location in the Czech Republic
- Coordinates: 49°9′28″N 15°49′5″E
- Country: Czech Republic
- Region: Vysočina
- District: Třebíč
- First mentioned: 1349

Area
  - Total: 4.65 km^{2} (1.80 sq mi)
- Elevation: 492 m (1,614 ft)

Population (2026-01-01)
  - Total: 463
  - Density: 99.6/km^{2} (258/sq mi)
- Time zone: UTC+1 (CET)
  - Summer (DST): UTC+2 (CEST)
- Postal code: 675 23
- Website: www.oukojetice.cz

Kojetice is a municipality and village in Třebíč District in the Vysočina Region of the Czech Republic. It has about 500 inhabitants.

== Geography ==
Kojetice is located about 7 kilometres (4 mi) southwest of Třebíč and 31 km (19 mi) southeast of Jihlava. It lies in the Jevišovice Uplands. The highest point is at 545 m (1,788 ft) above sea level. The Rokytná River flows through the municipality.

== History ==
The first written mention of Kojetice is from 1349.

== Demographics ==
Historical population

Year	Pop.	±%
1869	428	—
1880	423	−1.2%
1890	390	−7.8%
1900	429	+10.0%
1910	462	+7.7%

Year	Pop.	±%
1921	494	+6.9%
1930	494	+0.0%
1950	412	−16.6%
1961	469	+13.8%
1970	489	+4.3%

Year	Pop.	±%
1980	489	+0.0%
1991	442	−9.6%
2001	433	−2.0%
2011	446	+3.0%
2021	424	−4.9%

Source: Censuses

== Economy ==
In the municipality lies the northernmost vineyards in the Znojmo wine subregion. There are 5 hectares (12 acres) of vineyards.

== Transport ==
Kojetice is located on the railway line Znojmo–Okříšky.

== Sights ==
There are no protected cultural monuments in the municipality. In the centre of Kojetice is the Chapel of Saint Wenceslaus.

== Notable people ==
- Eliška Misáková (1926–1948), gymnast
