= Šebkovice =

- Municipality
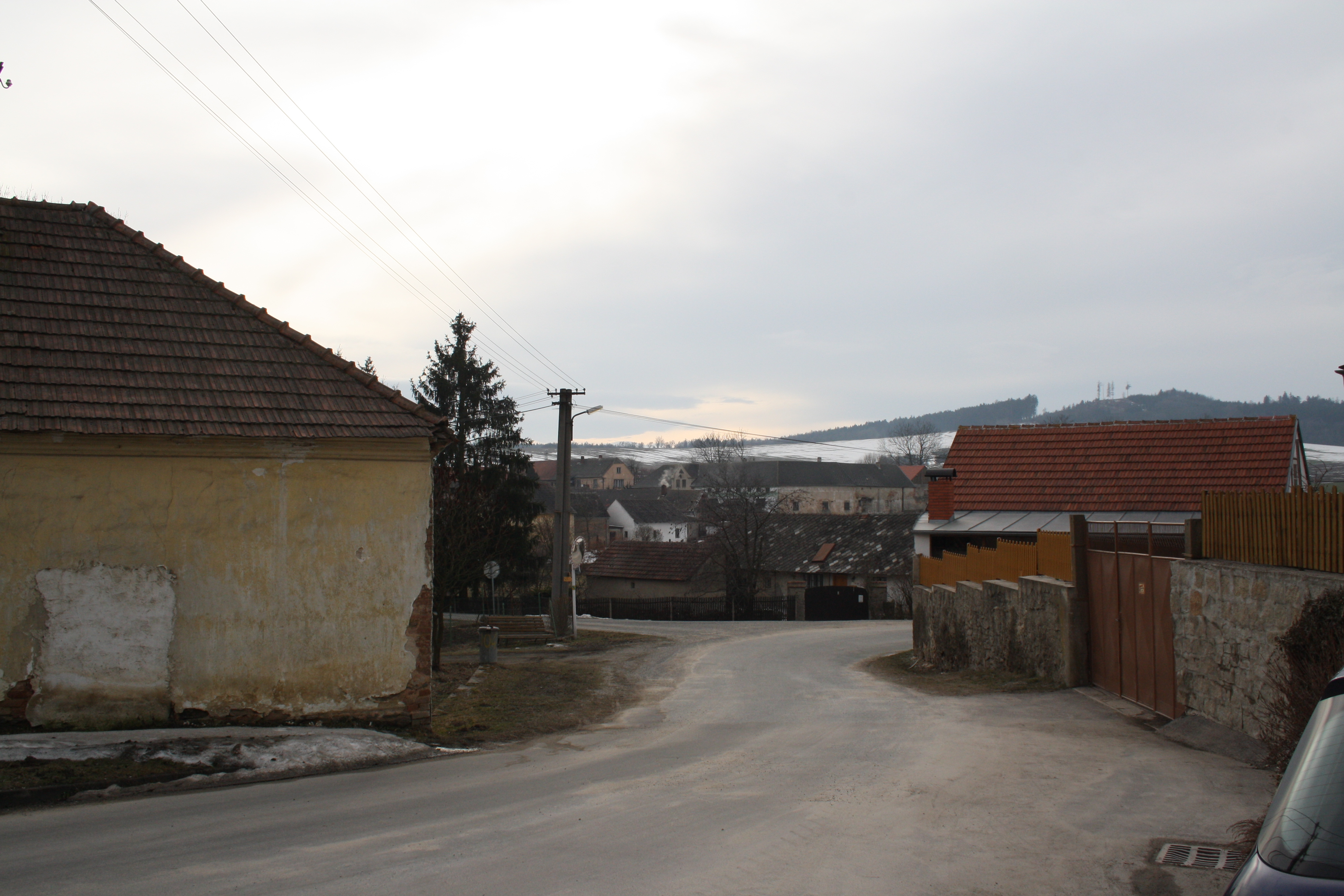
- Centre of Šebkovice

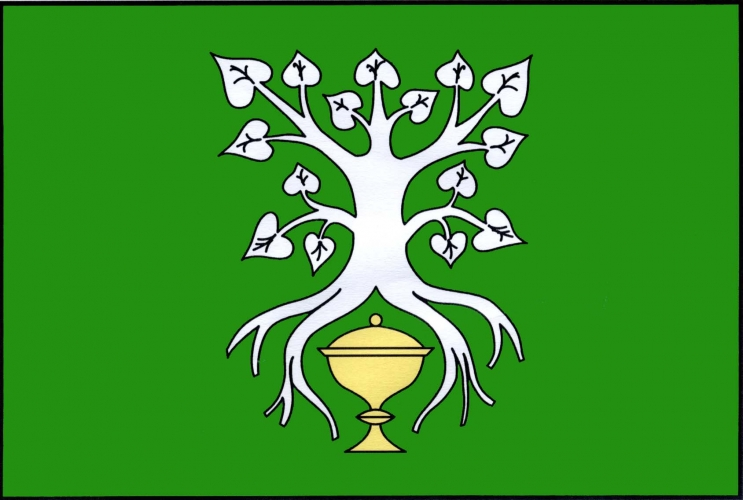
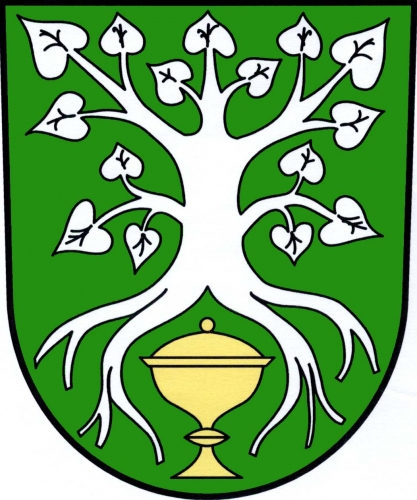
- Flag Coat of arms

- Location in the Czech Republic
- Coordinates: 49°7′23″N 15°48′49″E
- Country: Czech Republic
- Region: Vysočina
- District: Třebíč
- First mentioned: 1349

Area
  - Total: 10.73 km^{2} (4.14 sq mi)
- Elevation: 455 m (1,493 ft)

Population (2026-01-01)
  - Total: 499
  - Density: 46.5/km^{2} (120/sq mi)
- Time zone: UTC+1 (CET)
  - Summer (DST): UTC+2 (CEST)
- Postal code: 675 45
- Website: sebkovice.cz

Šebkovice is a municipality and village in Třebíč District in the Vysočina Region of the Czech Republic. It has about 500 inhabitants.

Šebkovice lies approximately 12 kilometres (7 mi) south-west of Třebíč, 35 km (22 mi) south-east of Jihlava, and 147 km (91 mi) south-east of Prague.

== Demographics ==
Historical population
Year	Pop.	±%
1869	566	—
1880	538	−4.9%
1890	560	+4.1%
1900	590	+5.4%
1910	607	+2.9%
1921	638	+5.1%
1930	587	−8.0%
1950	533	−9.2%
1961	537	+0.8%
1970	521	−3.0%
1980	545	+4.6%
1991	507	−7.0%
2001	502	−1.0%
2011	456	−9.2%
2021	457	+0.2%
Source: Censuses
