= Litovany =

- Municipality
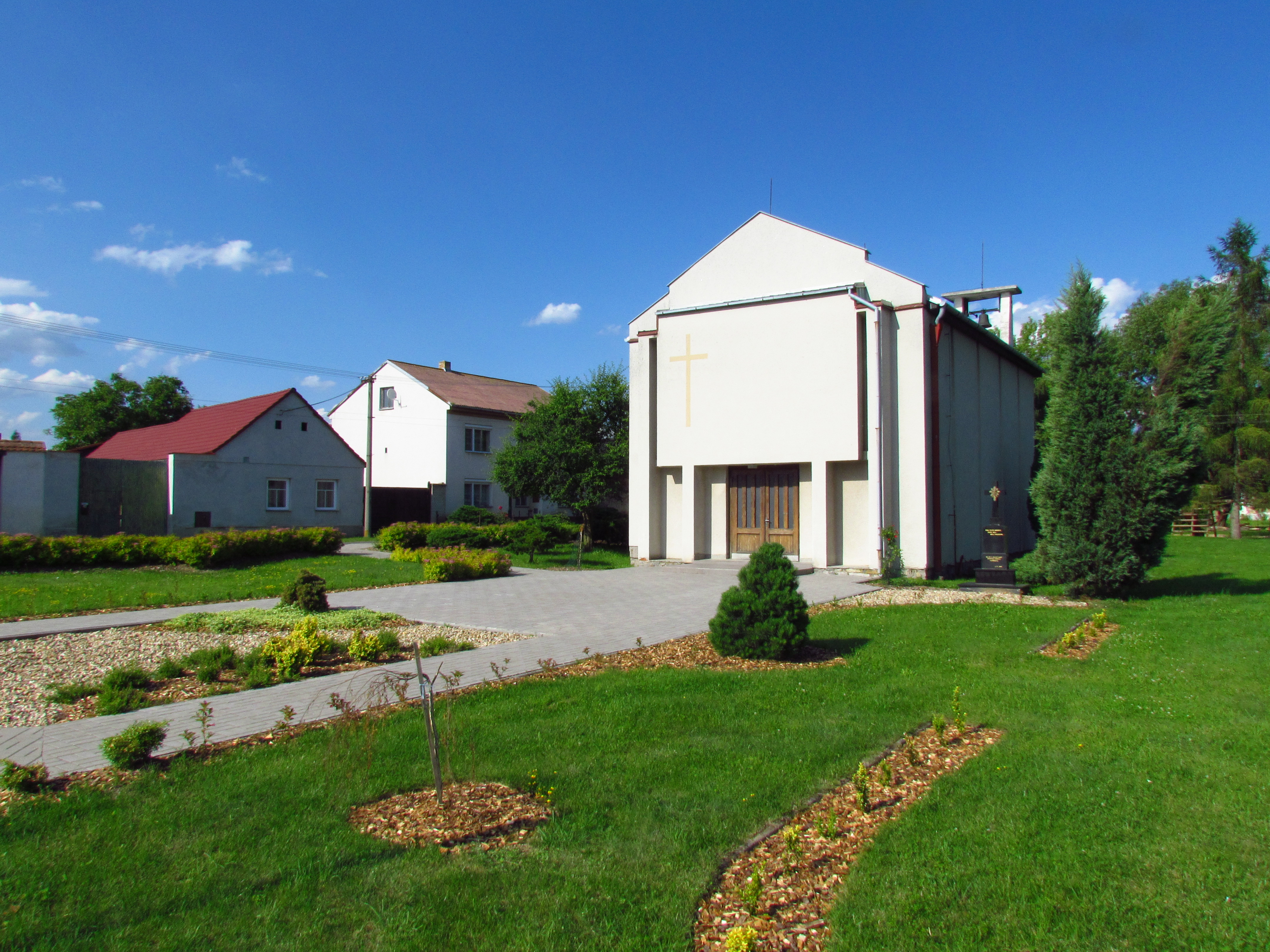
- Centre of Litovany with the Chapel of St. Pius X

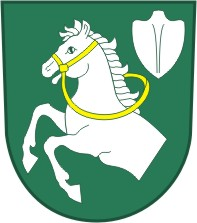
- Flag Coat of arms

- Location in the Czech Republic
- Coordinates: 49°3′18″N 16°2′38″E
- Country: Czech Republic
- Region: Vysočina
- District: Třebíč
- First mentioned: 1338

Area
  - Total: 6.64 km^{2} (2.56 sq mi)
- Elevation: 413 m (1,355 ft)

Population (2026-01-01)
  - Total: 126
  - Density: 19.0/km^{2} (49.1/sq mi)
- Time zone: UTC+1 (CET)
  - Summer (DST): UTC+2 (CEST)
- Postal code: 675 57
- Website: www.litovany.cz

Litovany is a municipality and village in Třebíč District in the Vysočina Region of the Czech Republic. It has about 100 inhabitants.

Litovany lies approximately 22 kilometres (14 mi) south-east of Třebíč, 51 km (32 mi) south-east of Jihlava, and 164 km (102 mi) south-east of Prague.

== Demographics ==
Historical population
Year	Pop.	±%
1869	376	—
1880	414	+10.1%
1890	472	+14.0%
1900	437	−7.4%
1910	379	−13.3%
1921	402	+6.1%
1930	411	+2.2%
1950	337	−18.0%
1961	298	−11.6%
1970	235	−21.1%
1980	213	−9.4%
1991	159	−25.4%
2001	149	−6.3%
2011	130	−12.8%
2021	120	−7.7%
Source: Censuses
