= Příštpo =

- Municipality
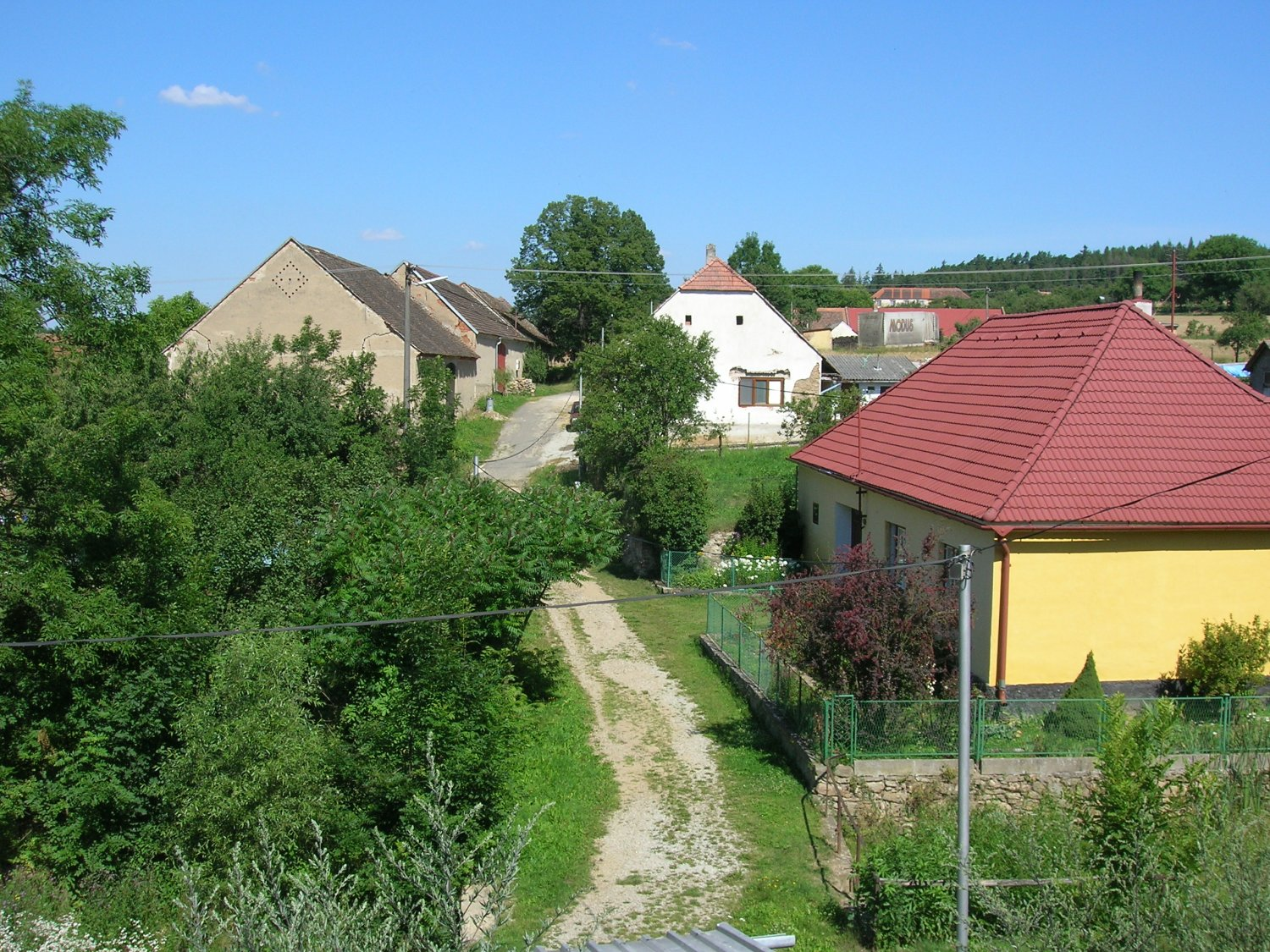
- Northwestern part of Příštpo

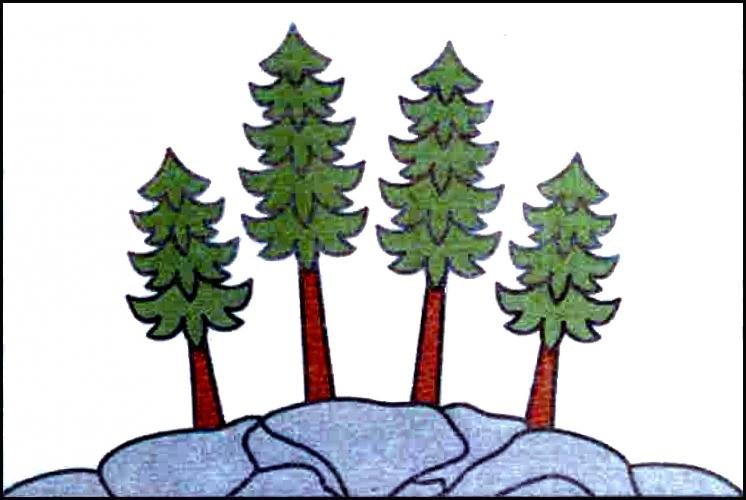
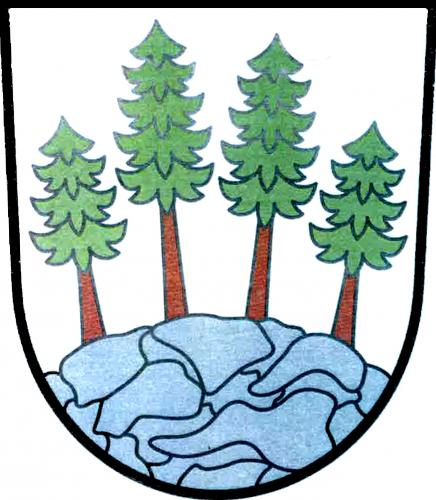
- Flag Coat of arms

- Location in the Czech Republic
- Coordinates: 49°4′26″N 15°56′6″E
- Country: Czech Republic
- Region: Vysočina
- District: Třebíč
- First mentioned: 1190

Area
  - Total: 14.42 km^{2} (5.57 sq mi)
- Elevation: 413 m (1,355 ft)

Population (2026-01-01)
  - Total: 256
  - Density: 17.8/km^{2} (46.0/sq mi)
- Time zone: UTC+1 (CET)
  - Summer (DST): UTC+2 (CEST)
- Postal code: 675 51
- Website: www.pristpo.eu

Příštpo is a municipality and village in Třebíč District in the Vysočina Region of the Czech Republic. It has about 300 inhabitants.

Příštpo lies approximately 17 kilometres (11 mi) south of Třebíč, 44 km (27 mi) south-east of Jihlava, and 157 km (98 mi) south-east of Prague.

== Demographics ==
Historical population
Year	Pop.	±%
1869	451	—
1880	535	+18.6%
1890	573	+7.1%
1900	570	−0.5%
1910	588	+3.2%
1921	614	+4.4%
1930	605	−1.5%
1950	452	−25.3%
1961	467	+3.3%
1970	457	−2.1%
1980	362	−20.8%
1991	276	−23.8%
2001	301	+9.1%
2011	274	−9.0%
2021	245	−10.6%
Source: Censuses
