= Bohutice =

- Municipality
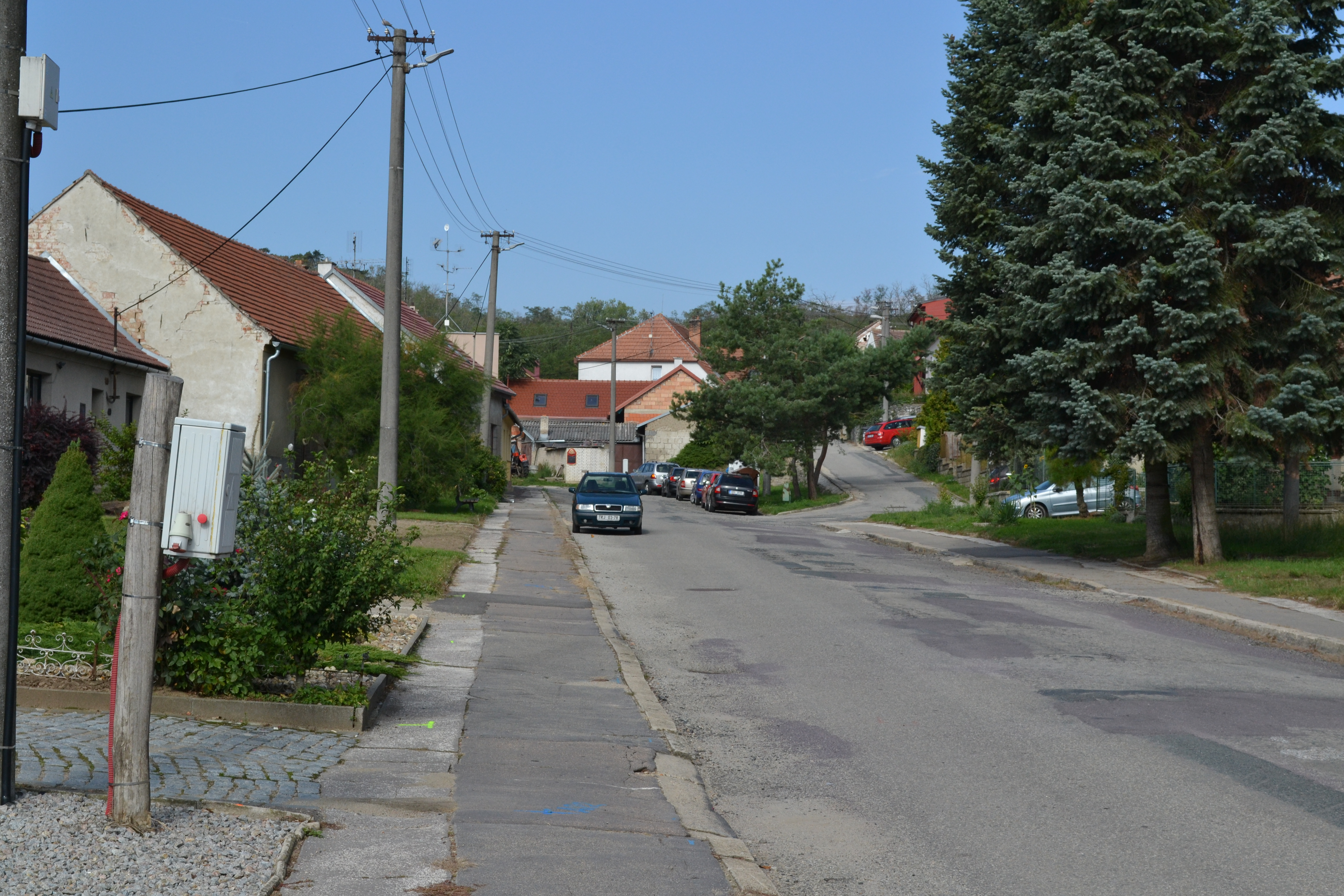
- Centre of Bohutice

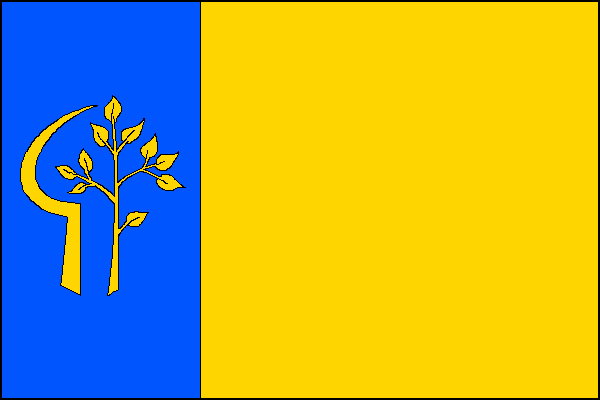
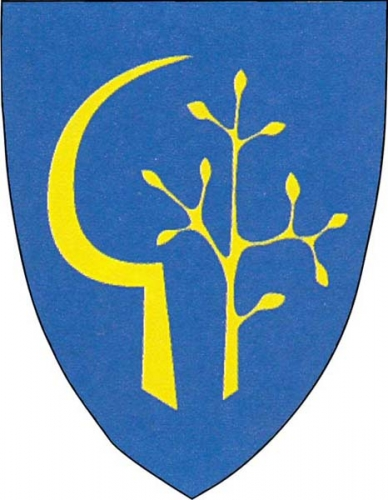
- Flag Coat of arms

- Location in the Czech Republic
- Coordinates: 48°59′29″N 16°21′28″E
- Country: Czech Republic
- Region: South Moravian
- District: Znojmo
- First mentioned: 1253

Area
  - Total: 7.18 km^{2} (2.77 sq mi)
- Elevation: 258 m (846 ft)

Population (2026-01-01)
  - Total: 693
  - Density: 96.5/km^{2} (250/sq mi)
- Time zone: UTC+1 (CET)
  - Summer (DST): UTC+2 (CEST)
- Postal code: 671 76
- Website: bohutice.cz

Bohutice is a municipality and village in Znojmo District in the South Moravian Region of the Czech Republic. It has about 700 inhabitants.

== Geography ==
Bohutice is located about 26 kilometres (16 mi) northeast of Znojmo and 26 km (16 mi) southwest of Brno. The western part of the municipality lies in the Bobrava Highlands and the eastern part lies in the Dyje–Svratka Valley. The highest point is at 372 m (1,220 ft) above sea level.

== History ==
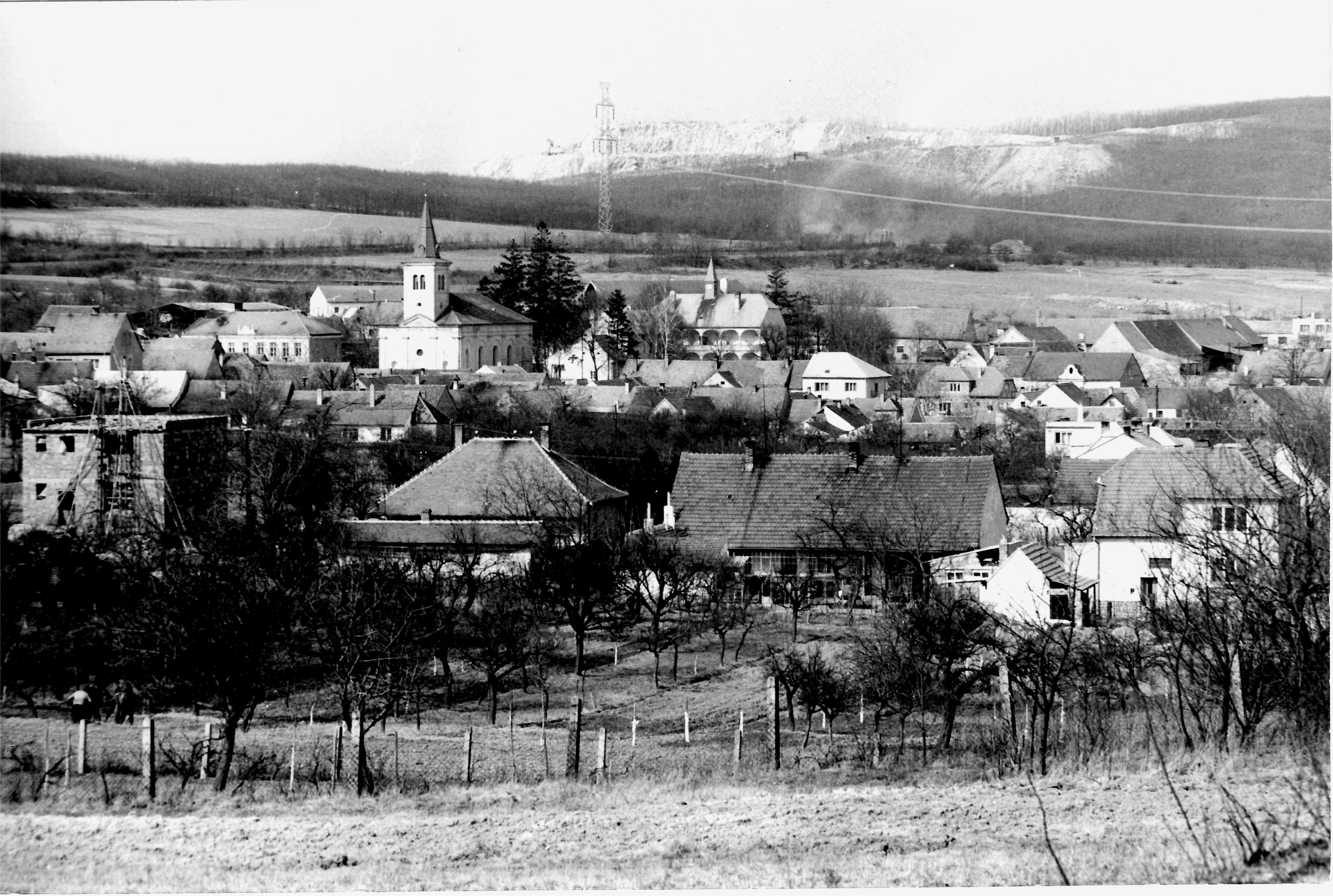
Bohutice in the 1970s

The first written mention of Bohutice is from 1253, mentioning a parish church. At the beginning of the 14th century, the village belonged to the Vyšehrad Chapter, from which Jindřich of Lipá bought it. In the next centuries, lords of Lipá lent it to their vassals. In 1535, Jan of Lipá sold Bohutice to Jan Kusý of Mukoděly, and the village became centre of a small estate.

In 1545, the Anabaptists settled in the village with permission of its owners and remained here until their expulsion in 1622. After the Battle of White Mountain, the properties of the Kusý of Mukoděly family were confiscated. During the Thirty Years' War in 1619, the village was burned down entirely. After the war, Bohutice was donated to the Jesuits.

The Order of Jesuits was disbanded in 1773, and the Bohutice estate was acquired by Jan Topolanský. After his death in 1792, the widow Terezie married Jan Václav Petříček in 1808, after whose death in 1825 the estate passed through the marriage of his daughter Aloisie to the family of Josef Seydl. The last owner was Hans Seydl-Neuschel, whose property was confiscated after the end of World War II.

== Demographics ==
Historical population

Year	Pop.	±%
1869	539	—
1880	694	+28.8%
1890	707	+1.9%
1900	738	+4.4%
1910	697	−5.6%

Year	Pop.	±%
1921	778	+11.6%
1930	768	−1.3%
1950	669	−12.9%
1961	800	+19.6%
1970	720	−10.0%

Year	Pop.	±%
1980	701	−2.6%
1991	603	−14.0%
2001	617	+2.3%
2011	607	−1.6%
2021	645	+6.3%

Source: Censuses

== Economy ==
Bohutice is known for viticulture. It lies in the Znojemská wine subregion. The first vineyard in Bohutice was founded in 1237. About 7 hectares (17 acres) of vineyards are in the municipality. Mainly St. Laurent and Grüner Veltliner are grown here.

Bohutice is also known for apricot growing. A variety called "Bohutická apricot" or Abricot Surce de Bohutice was bred here.

== Transport ==
Bohutice is located on the railway line Brno–Hrušovany nad Jevišovkou.

== Culture ==
The Summer Apricot Carnival is an annual event held in summer, which is based on the tradition of growing apricots. The event includes a competition for the best apricot jam and the best apricot spirit.

Bohutický košt ('Bohutice tasting') is an annual exhibition of local wine production held in April.

Autumn Bohunice Festivities is a festival held in autumn. It includes music performances, craft demonstrations and consumption of local drinks and meals.

== Sights ==
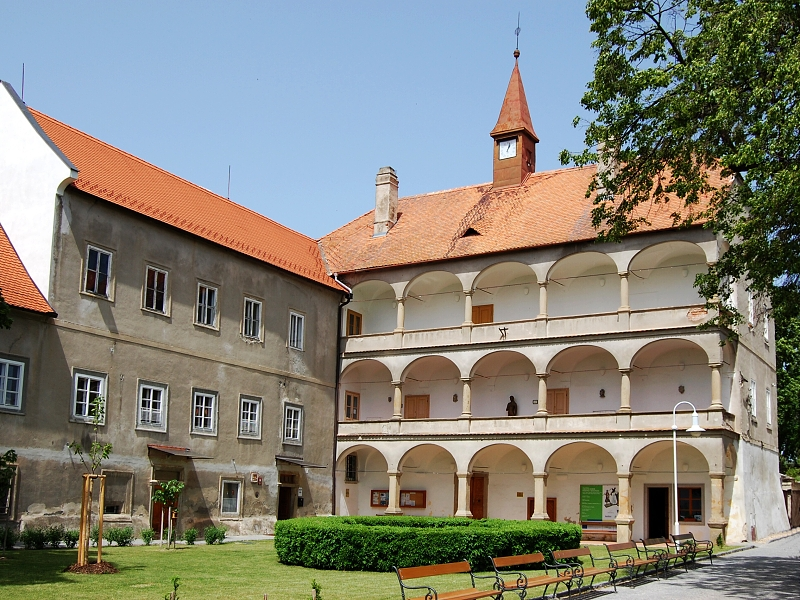
Bohutice Castle

The most important monuments in the municipality are the Bohutice Castle and the Church of the Assumption of Our Lady. A fortress in Bohutice was first documented in 1535. The Bohutice Castle comes from around 1600, when the old fortress was reconstructed into the Renaissance residence. Today the castle serves cultural, educational and social purposes, and also houses the municipal archive or a kindergarten.

In the castle, there is an exhibition of 54 life-sized wooden statues depicting the Stations of the Cross connected to Jesus Christ's last way to the Golgotha hill. In the courtyard of the castle, there are four wine cellars.

In the western part of the village, there is the Lourdes grotto. The pilgrimage site was created by the plans of Pastor Antonín Prášek and was inaugurated on 22 July 1928. The pilgrimage tradition was banned in 1948 and was renewed in 1990.
