= Přešovice =

- Municipality
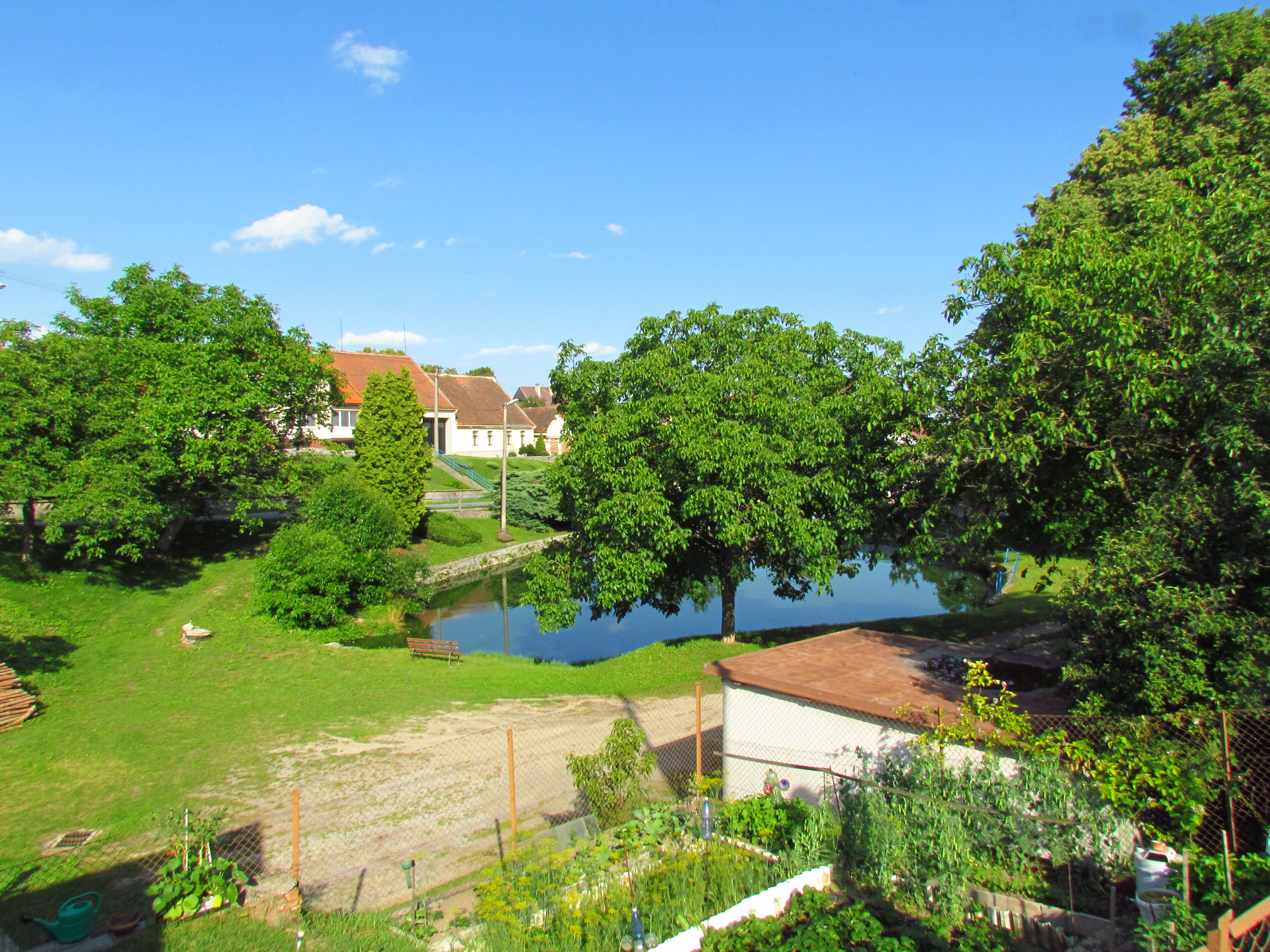
- Centre of Přešovice

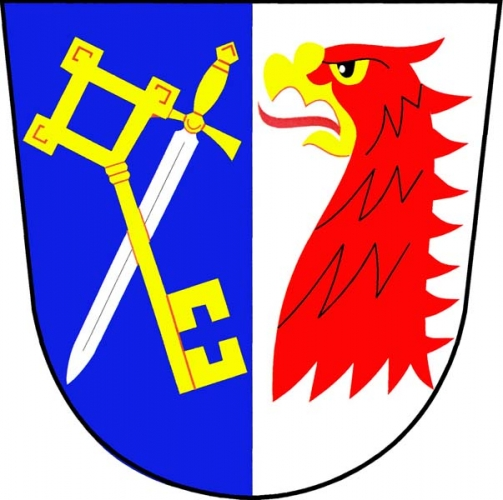
- Flag Coat of arms

- Location in the Czech Republic
- Coordinates: 49°3′0″N 16°3′41″E
- Country: Czech Republic
- Region: Vysočina
- District: Třebíč
- First mentioned: 1088

Area
  - Total: 6.75 km^{2} (2.61 sq mi)
- Elevation: 417 m (1,368 ft)

Population (2026-01-01)
  - Total: 137
  - Density: 20.3/km^{2} (52.6/sq mi)
- Time zone: UTC+1 (CET)
  - Summer (DST): UTC+2 (CEST)
- Postal code: 675 57
- Website: www.presovice.cz

Přešovice is a municipality and village in Třebíč District in the Vysočina Region of the Czech Republic. It has about 100 inhabitants.

Přešovice lies approximately 23 kilometres (14 mi) south-east of Třebíč, 52 km (32 mi) south-east of Jihlava, and 166 km (103 mi) south-east of Prague.

== Demographics ==
Historical population
Year	Pop.	±%
1869	295	—
1880	279	−5.4%
1890	269	−3.6%
1900	288	+7.1%
1910	247	−14.2%
1921	280	+13.4%
1930	321	+14.6%
1950	235	−26.8%
1961	238	+1.3%
1970	244	+2.5%
1980	216	−11.5%
1991	178	−17.6%
2001	147	−17.4%
2011	144	−2.0%
2021	134	−6.9%
Source: Censuses
