= Čermákovice =

Municipality in the Czech Republic

- Municipality
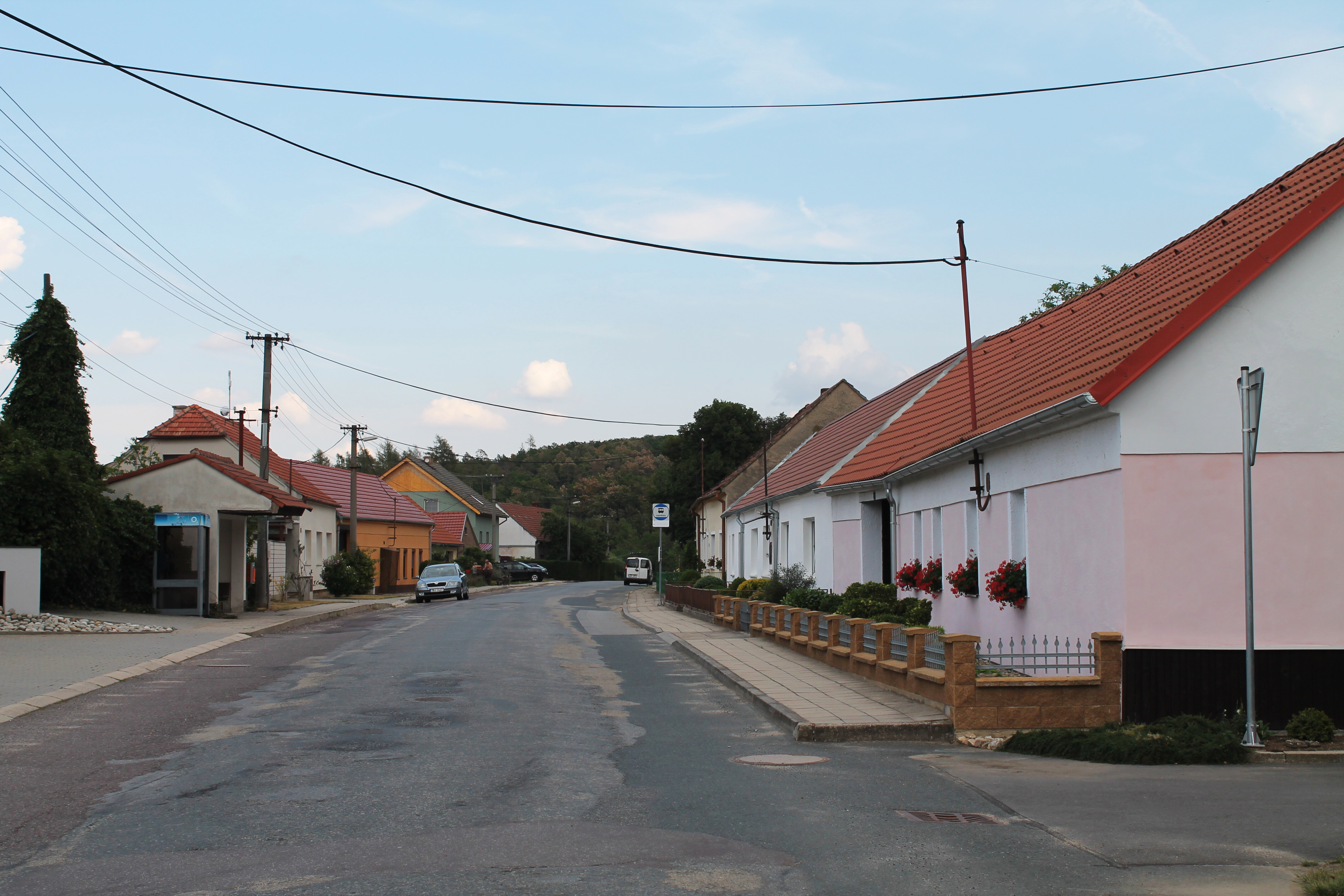
- Main street

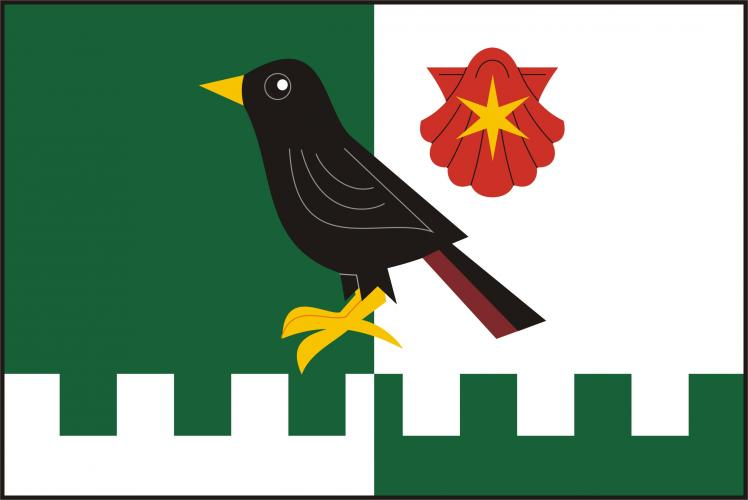
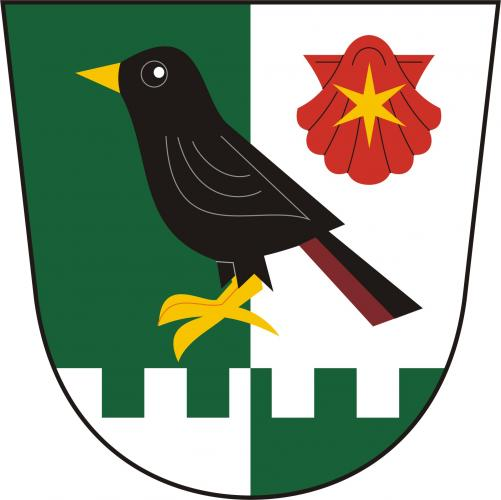
- Flag Coat of arms

- Location in the Czech Republic
- Coordinates: 49°1′56″N 16°11′42″E
- Country: Czech Republic
- Region: South Moravian
- District: Znojmo
- First mentioned: 1270

Area
  - Total: 5.31 km^{2} (2.05 sq mi)
- Elevation: 361 m (1,184 ft)

Population (2026-01-01)
  - Total: 107
  - Density: 20.2/km^{2} (52.2/sq mi)
- Time zone: UTC+1 (CET)
  - Summer (DST): UTC+2 (CEST)
- Postal code: 671 73
- Website: www.obec-cermakovice.cz

Čermákovice is a municipality and village in Znojmo District in the South Moravian Region of the Czech Republic. It has about 100 inhabitants.

Čermákovice lies approximately 23 kilometres (14 mi) north-east of Znojmo, 37 km (23 mi) south-west of Brno, and 175 km (109 mi) south-east of Prague.

== Demographics ==
Historical population
Year	Pop.	±%
1869	230	—
1880	263	+14.3%
1890	259	−1.5%
1900	278	+7.3%
1910	259	−6.8%
1921	257	−0.8%
1930	262	+1.9%
1950	248	−5.3%
1961	271	+9.3%
1970	232	−14.4%
1980	155	−33.2%
1991	105	−32.3%
2001	91	−13.3%
2011	94	+3.3%
2021	88	−6.4%
Source: Censuses
