= Lesůňky =

- Municipality
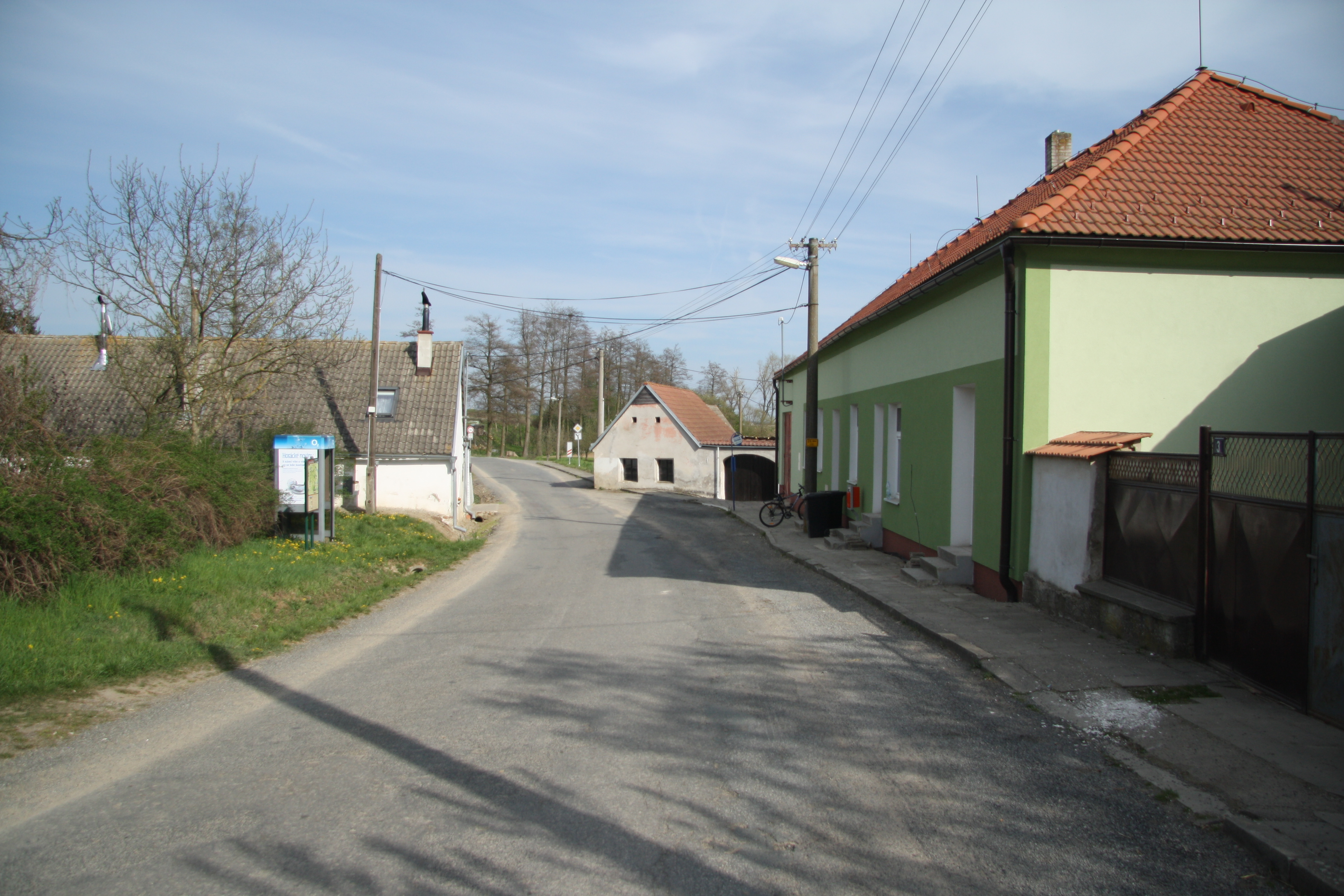
- Centre of Lesůňky

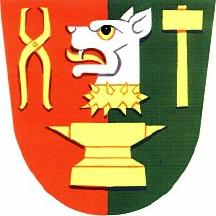
- Flag Coat of arms

- Location in the Czech Republic
- Coordinates: 49°6′26″N 15°50′32″E
- Country: Czech Republic
- Region: Vysočina
- District: Třebíč
- First mentioned: 1387

Area
  - Total: 3.49 km^{2} (1.35 sq mi)
- Elevation: 440 m (1,440 ft)

Population (2026-01-01)
  - Total: 85
  - Density: 24/km^{2} (63/sq mi)
- Time zone: UTC+1 (CET)
  - Summer (DST): UTC+2 (CEST)
- Postal code: 675 51
- Website: www.lesunky.cz

Lesůňky is a municipality and village in Třebíč District in the Vysočina Region of the Czech Republic. It has about 90 inhabitants.

Lesůňky lies approximately 13 kilometres (8 mi) south of Třebíč, 37 km (23 mi) south-east of Jihlava, and 150 km (93 mi) south-east of Prague.

== Demographics ==
Historical population
Year	Pop.	±%
1869	202	—
1880	190	−5.9%
1890	172	−9.5%
1900	213	+23.8%
1910	220	+3.3%
1921	208	−5.5%
1930	188	−9.6%
1950	148	−21.3%
1961	157	+6.1%
1970	132	−15.9%
1980	124	−6.1%
1991	103	−16.9%
2001	85	−17.5%
2011	96	+12.9%
2021	77	−19.8%
Source: Censuses
