= Rybníky (Znojmo District) =

- Municipality
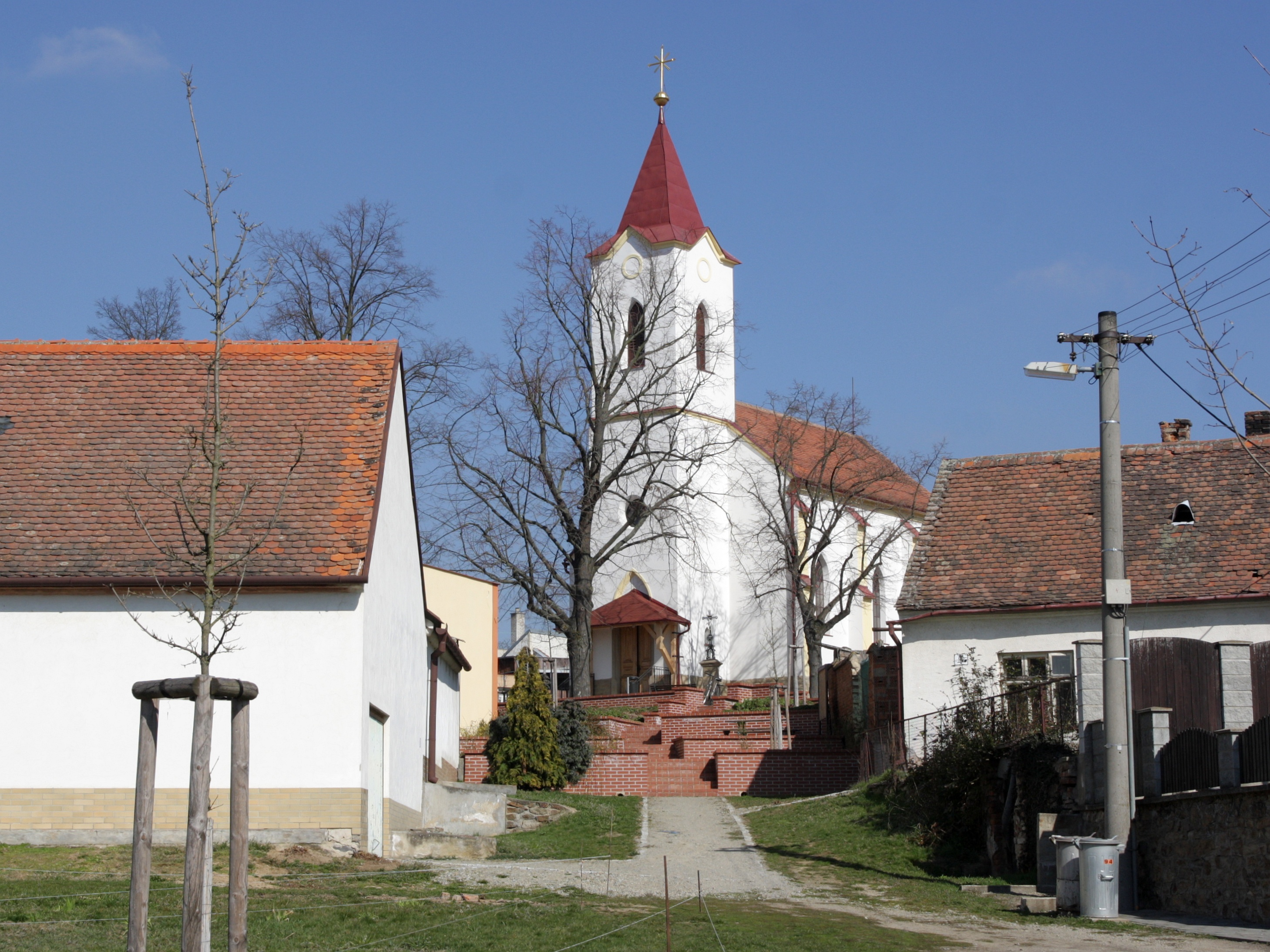
- Church of Saints Cyril and Methodius

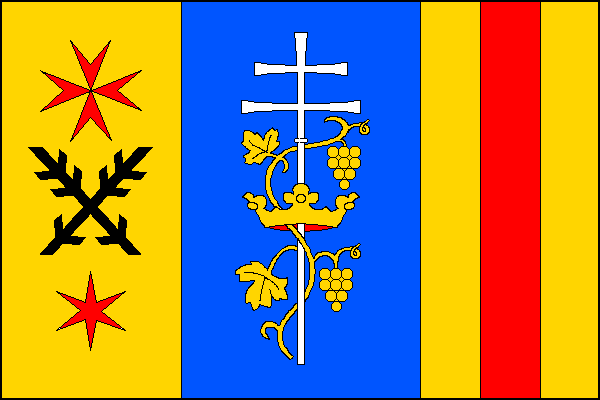
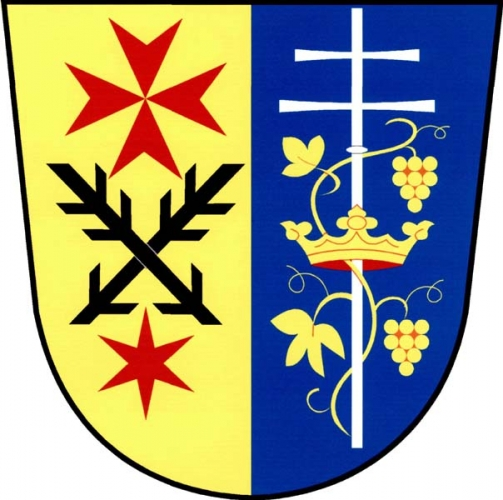
- Flag Coat of arms

- Location in the Czech Republic
- Coordinates: 49°1′35″N 16°16′46″E
- Country: Czech Republic
- Region: South Moravian
- District: Znojmo
- First mentioned: 1238

Area
  - Total: 8.42 km^{2} (3.25 sq mi)
- Elevation: 242 m (794 ft)

Population (2026-01-01)
  - Total: 437
  - Density: 51.9/km^{2} (134/sq mi)
- Time zone: UTC+1 (CET)
  - Summer (DST): UTC+2 (CEST)
- Postal code: 672 01
- Website: www.obecrybniky.cz

Rybníky is a municipality and village in Znojmo District in the South Moravian Region of the Czech Republic. It has about 400 inhabitants.

Rybníky lies approximately 27 kilometres (17 mi) north-east of Znojmo, 31 km (19 mi) south-west of Brno, and 179 km (111 mi) south-east of Prague.

== Demographics ==
Historical population
Year	Pop.	±%
1869	482	—
1880	512	+6.2%
1890	540	+5.5%
1900	546	+1.1%
1910	575	+5.3%
1921	601	+4.5%
1930	589	−2.0%
1950	495	−16.0%
1961	507	+2.4%
1970	482	−4.9%
1980	472	−2.1%
1991	391	−17.2%
2001	375	−4.1%
2011	403	+7.5%
2021	427	+6.0%
Source: Censuses
