= Okříšky =

- Market town
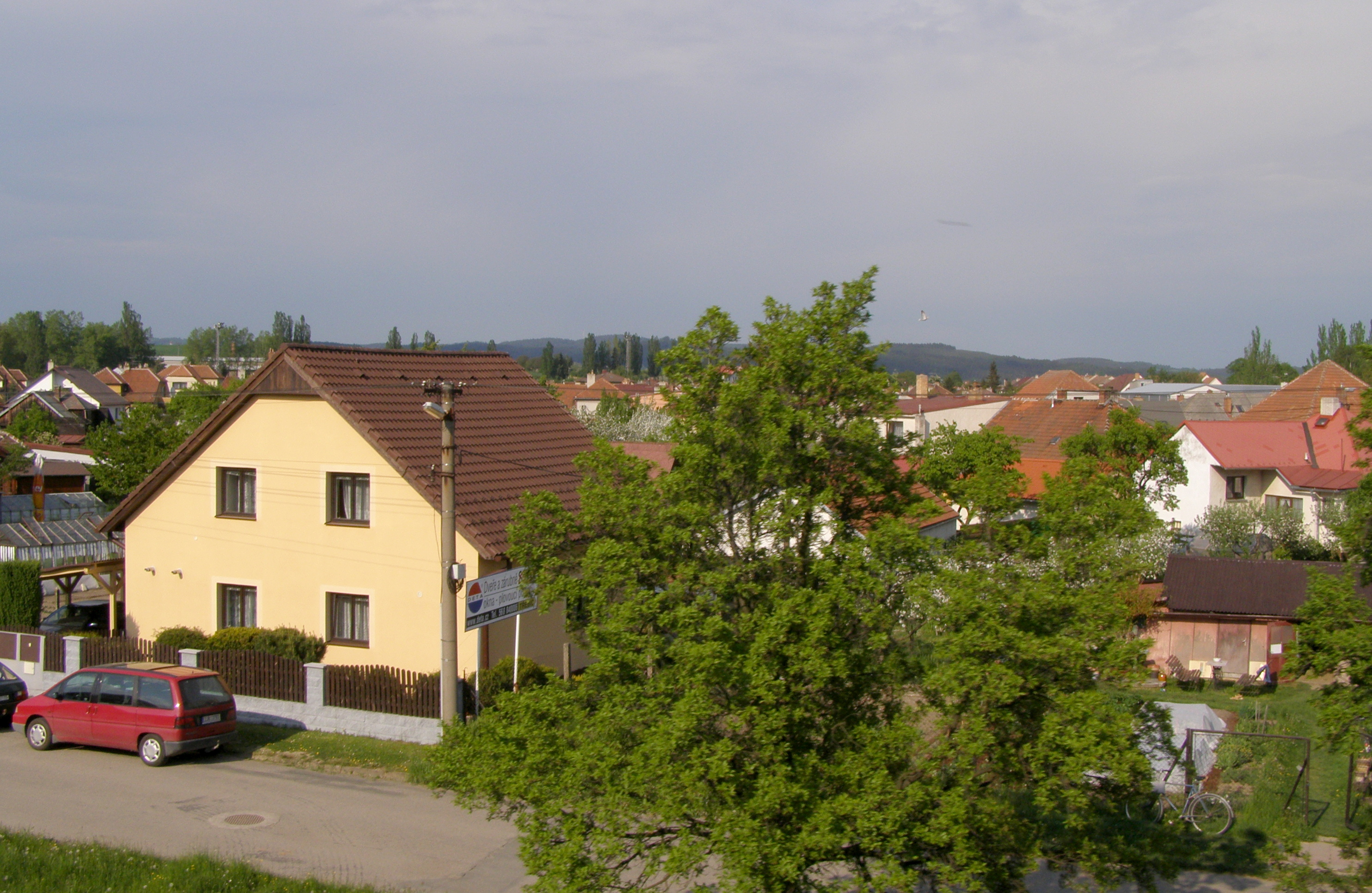
- View from the west

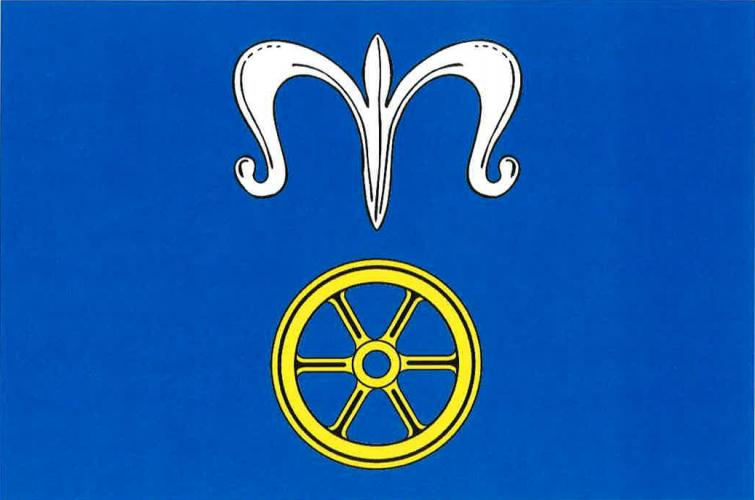
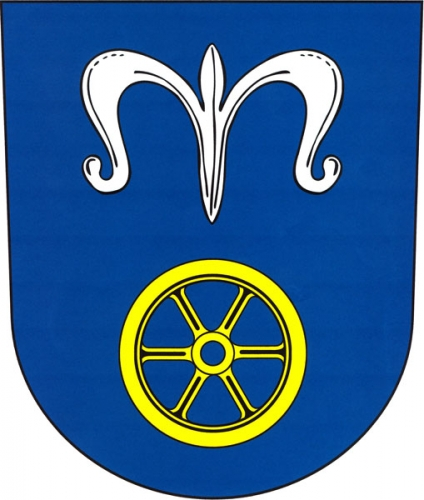
- Flag Coat of arms

- Location in the Czech Republic
- Coordinates: 49°14′44″N 15°46′11″E
- Country: Czech Republic
- Region: Vysočina
- District: Třebíč
- First mentioned: 1371

Area
  - Total: 6.57 km^{2} (2.54 sq mi)
- Elevation: 472 m (1,549 ft)

Population (2026-01-01)
  - Total: 2,007
  - Density: 305/km^{2} (791/sq mi)
- Time zone: UTC+1 (CET)
  - Summer (DST): UTC+2 (CEST)
- Postal code: 675 21
- Website: www.okrisky.cz

Okříšky (Czech pronunciation: [ˈokr̝̊iːʃkɪ]) is a market town in Třebíč District in the Vysočina Region of the Czech Republic. It has about 2,000 inhabitants.

== Etymology ==
According to one theory, the name is derived from the personal name Okřeša or Oskora. According to the second theory, the name is derived from the Czech verb okřísit (i.e. 'resurrect') and may have been created after the village disappeared and was then restored.

== Geography ==
Okříšky is located about 8 kilometres (5 mi) northwest of Třebíč and 21 km (13 mi) southeast of Jihlava. It lies on the border between the Jevišovice Uplands and Křižanov Highlands. The highest point is at 610 m (2,001 ft) above sea level. The stream Okříšský potok flows through the market town and supplies the fishponds Pilný rybník and Zámecký rybník.

== History ==
The first written mention of Okříšky is in a deed of Margrave John Henry from 1371, in which the margrave property is divided between his sons and the Rokštejn estate (including the village of Okříšky) was given to John Sobieslaw. In the 15th century, the Rokštejn estate became property of the Waldstein family. From 1466 to 1540, Okříšky was owned by the Petrovský of Hrochov family; then the owners often changed.

== Demographics ==
Historical population

Year	Pop.	±%
1869	651	—
1880	613	−5.8%
1890	782	+27.6%
1900	961	+22.9%
1910	1,083	+12.7%

Year	Pop.	±%
1921	1,102	+1.8%
1930	1,356	+23.0%
1950	1,313	−3.2%
1961	1,718	+30.8%
1970	1,845	+7.4%

Year	Pop.	±%
1980	2,141	+16.0%
1991	2,053	−4.1%
2001	2,022	−1.5%
2011	2,025	+0.1%
2021	1,960	−3.2%

Source: Censuses

== Transport ==
Okříšky is located on the interregional railway line Brno–Jihlava. It is also the starting point of the lines to Znojmo and to Veselí nad Lužnicí.

== Sights ==
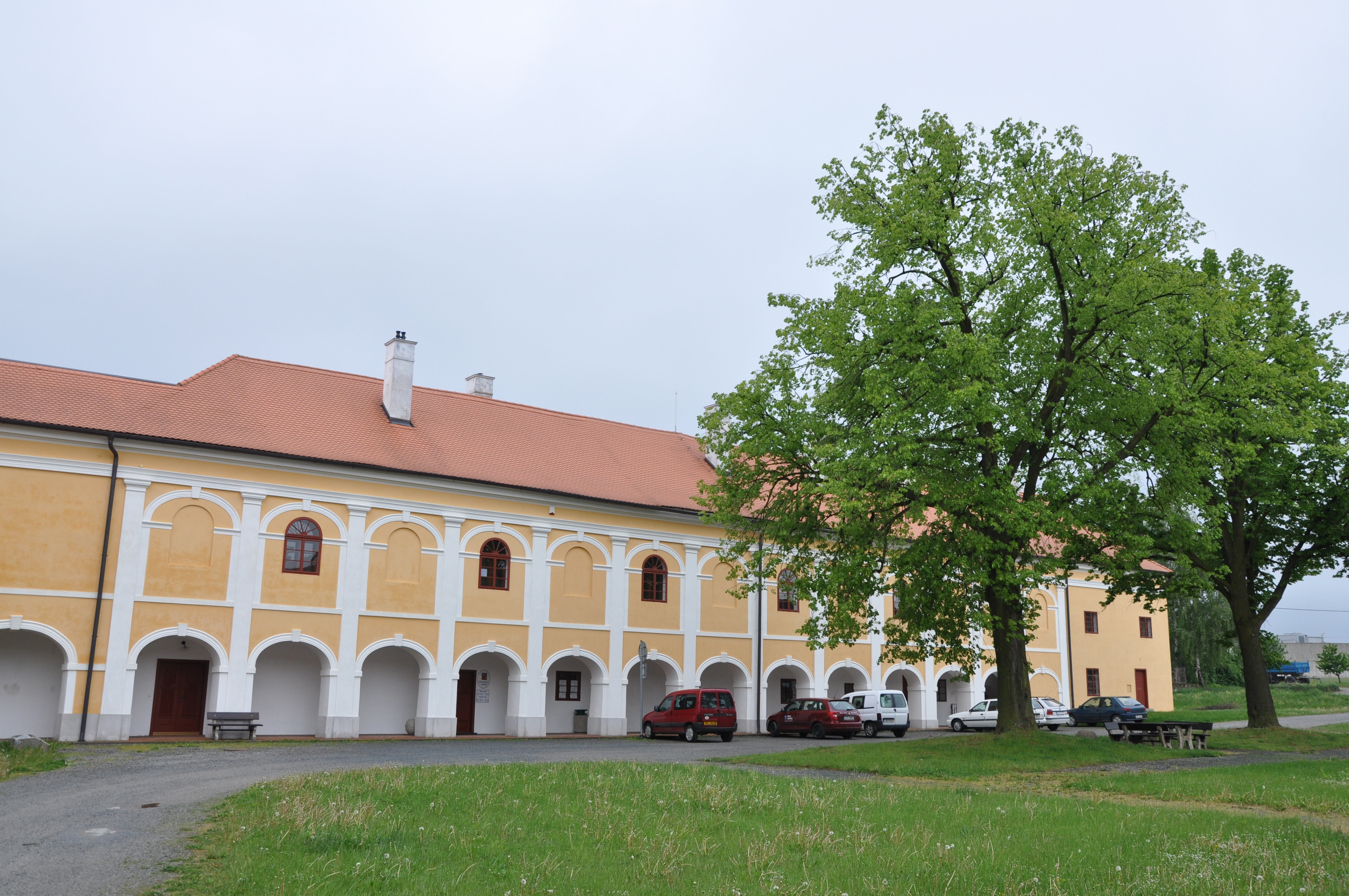
Okříšky Castle

The oldest monument is the Okříšky Castle. The original medieval fortress was rebuilt into a small Renaissance residence at the end of the 16th century. Later it was rebuilt in the Baroque style. Today it houses the municipal office and is used for cultural and social purposes.

Next to the castle is the Church of the Name of the Virgin Mary. It was built in the early Baroque style in 1673.

== Notable people ==
- František Konvička (born 1939), basketball player and coach

== Twin towns – sister cities ==
Okříšky is twinned with:

- San Pier d'Isonzo, Italy
