= Trstěnice =

Trstěnice may refer to places in the Czech Republic:

- Trstěnice (Cheb District), a municipality and village in the Karlovy Vary Region
- Trstěnice (Svitavy District), a municipality and village in the Pardubice Region
- Trstěnice (Znojmo District), a municipality and village in the South Moravian Region

== See also ==
- Trstenice, a type of pan flute
