= Dobelice =

- Municipality
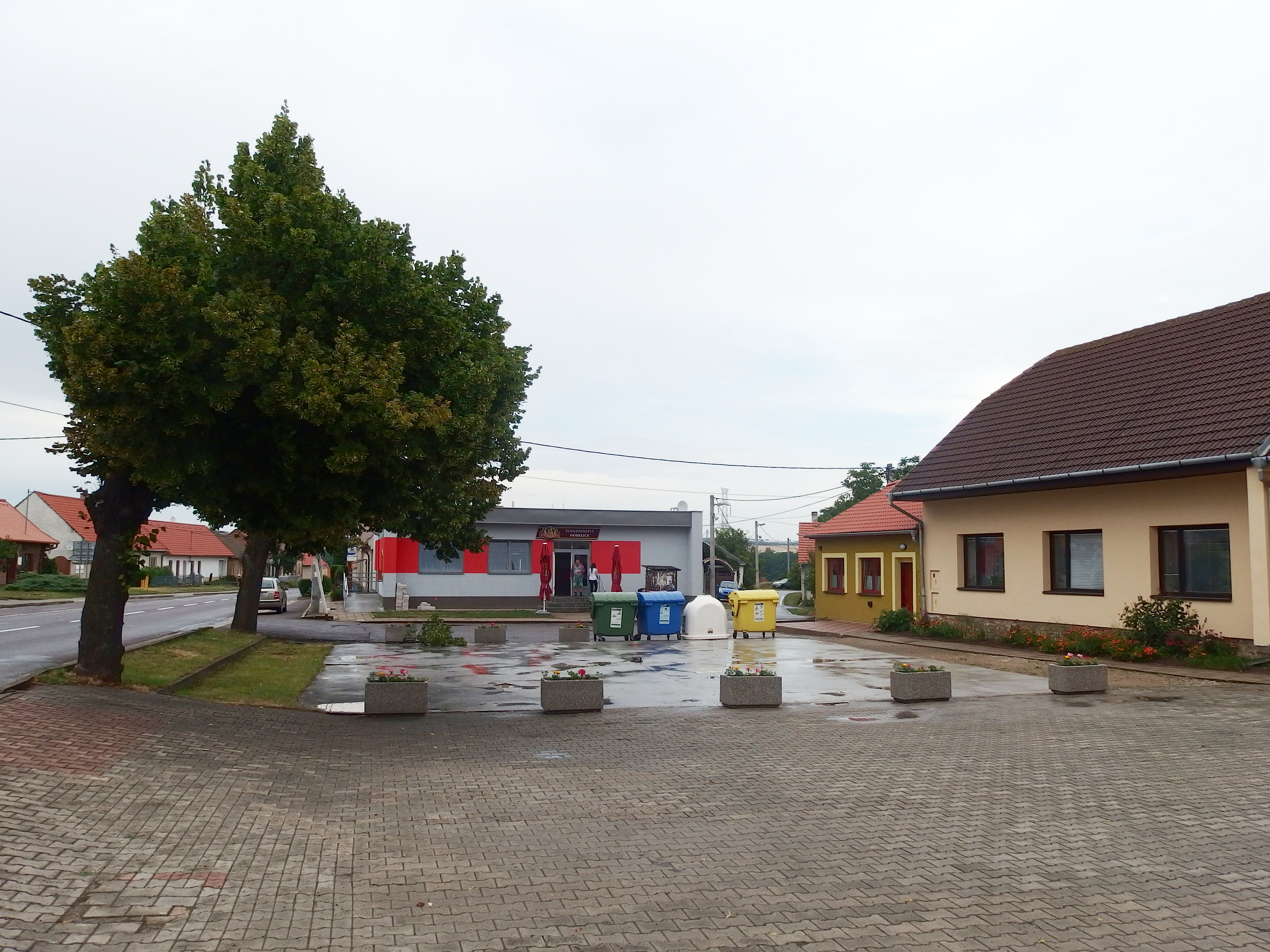
- Centre of Dobelice

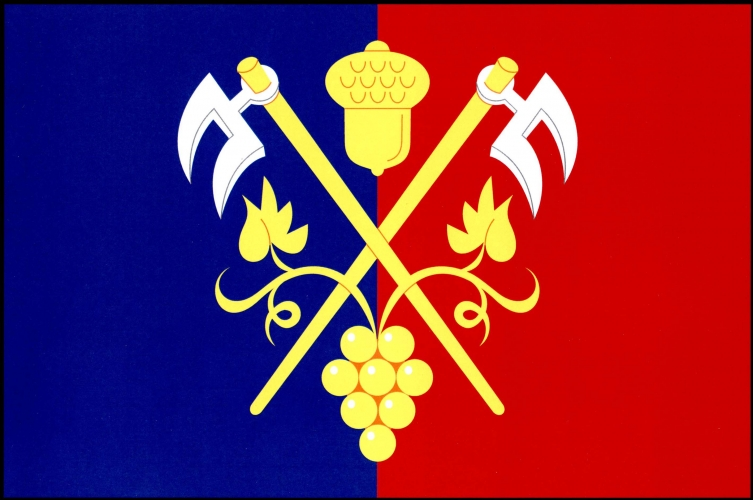
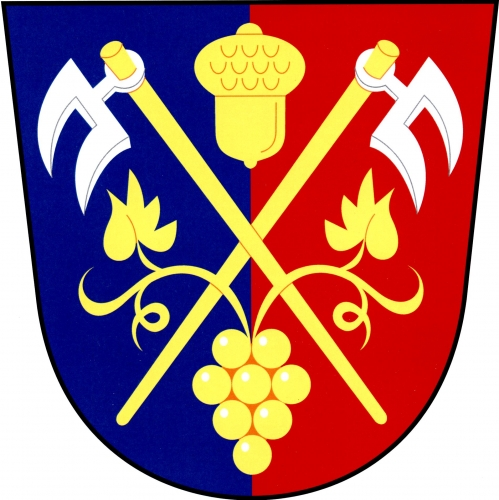
- Flag Coat of arms

- Location in the Czech Republic
- Coordinates: 49°1′2″N 16°16′43″E
- Country: Czech Republic
- Region: South Moravian
- District: Znojmo
- First mentioned: 1260

Area
  - Total: 4.00 km^{2} (1.54 sq mi)
- Elevation: 255 m (837 ft)

Population (2026-01-01)
  - Total: 256
  - Density: 64.0/km^{2} (166/sq mi)
- Time zone: UTC+1 (CET)
  - Summer (DST): UTC+2 (CEST)
- Postal code: 672 01
- Website: www.dobelice.cz

Dobelice is a municipality and village in Znojmo District in the South Moravian Region of the Czech Republic. It has about 300 inhabitants.

Dobelice lies approximately 25 kilometres (16 mi) north-east of Znojmo, 33 km (21 mi) south-west of Brno, and 180 km (110 mi) south-east of Prague.

== Demographics ==
Historical population
Year	Pop.	±%
1869	238	—
1880	257	+8.0%
1890	272	+5.8%
1900	262	−3.7%
1910	261	−0.4%
1921	270	+3.4%
1930	252	−6.7%
1950	270	+7.1%
1961	282	+4.4%
1970	284	+0.7%
1980	266	−6.3%
1991	274	+3.0%
2001	269	−1.8%
2011	260	−3.3%
2021	251	−3.5%
Source: Censuses
