= Zálesí =

- Municipality
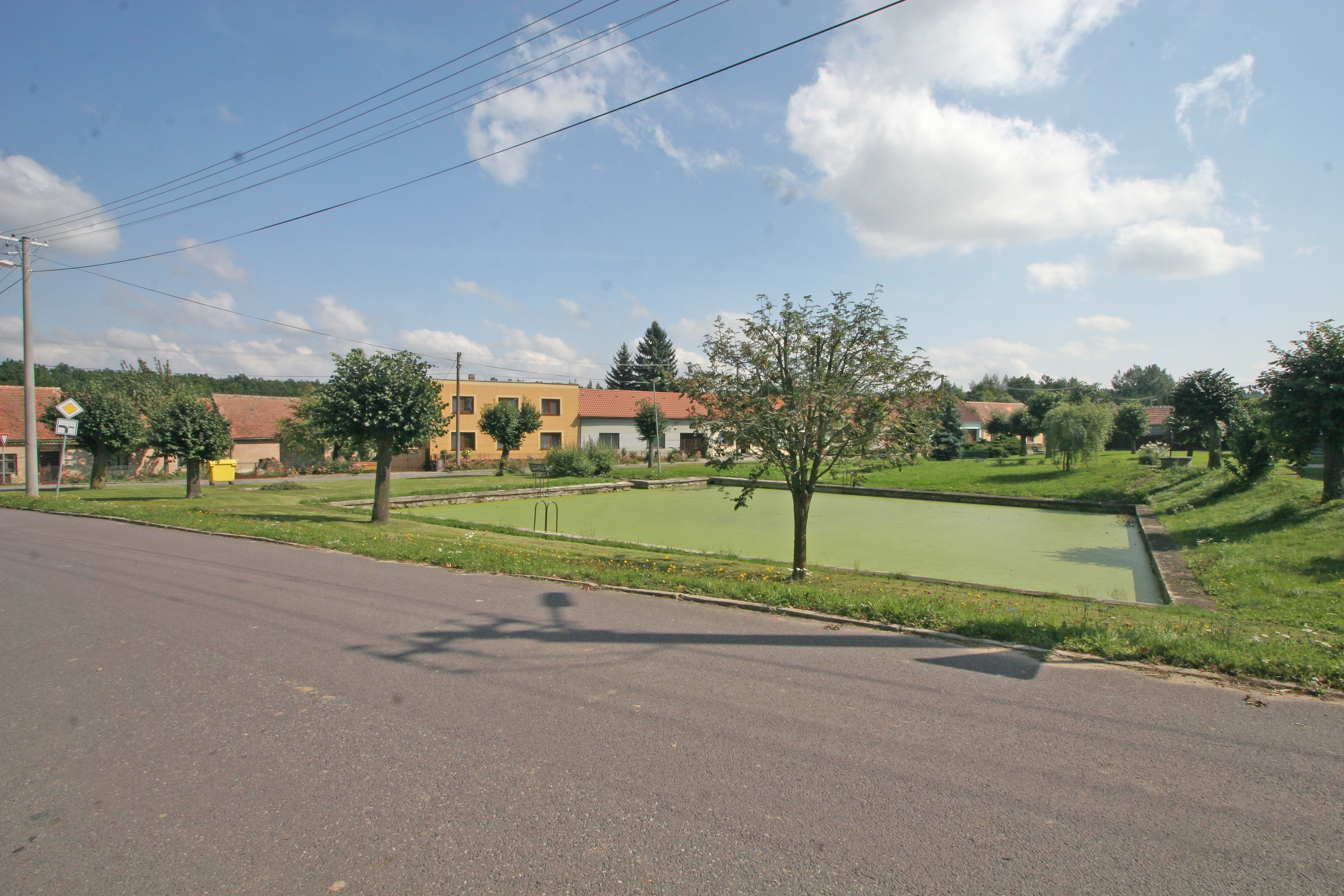
- Centre of Zálesí

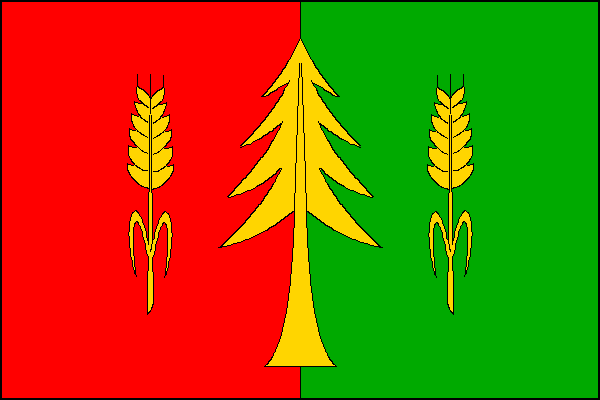
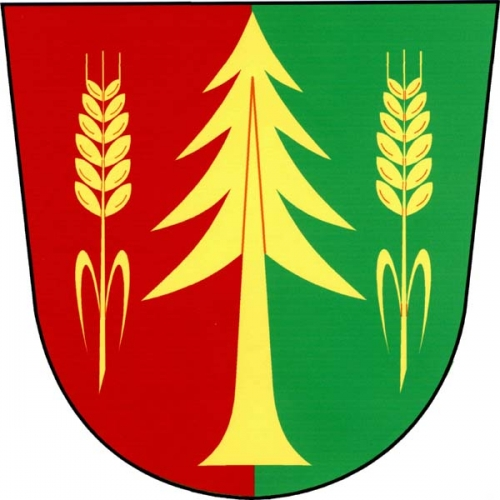
- Flag Coat of arms

- Location in the Czech Republic
- Coordinates: 48°57′15″N 15°46′55″E
- Country: Czech Republic
- Region: South Moravian
- District: Znojmo
- First mentioned: 1786

Area
  - Total: 7.18 km^{2} (2.77 sq mi)
- Elevation: 431 m (1,414 ft)

Population (2026-01-01)
  - Total: 152
  - Density: 21.2/km^{2} (54.8/sq mi)
- Time zone: UTC+1 (CET)
  - Summer (DST): UTC+2 (CEST)
- Postal code: 671 02
- Website: www.obec-zalesi.cz

Zálesí is a municipality and village in Znojmo District in the South Moravian Region of the Czech Republic. It has about 200 inhabitants.

Zálesí lies approximately 23 kilometres (14 mi) north-west of Znojmo, 66 km (41 mi) south-west of Brno, and 159 km (99 mi) south-east of Prague.

== Demographics ==
Historical population
Year	Pop.	±%
1869	236	—
1880	227	−3.8%
1890	172	−24.2%
1900	277	+61.0%
1910	267	−3.6%
1921	273	+2.2%
1930	295	+8.1%
1950	296	+0.3%
1961	344	+16.2%
1970	287	−16.6%
1980	256	−10.8%
1991	221	−13.7%
2001	194	−12.2%
2011	179	−7.7%
2021	154	−14.0%
Source: Censuses
