= Ctidružice =

- Municipality
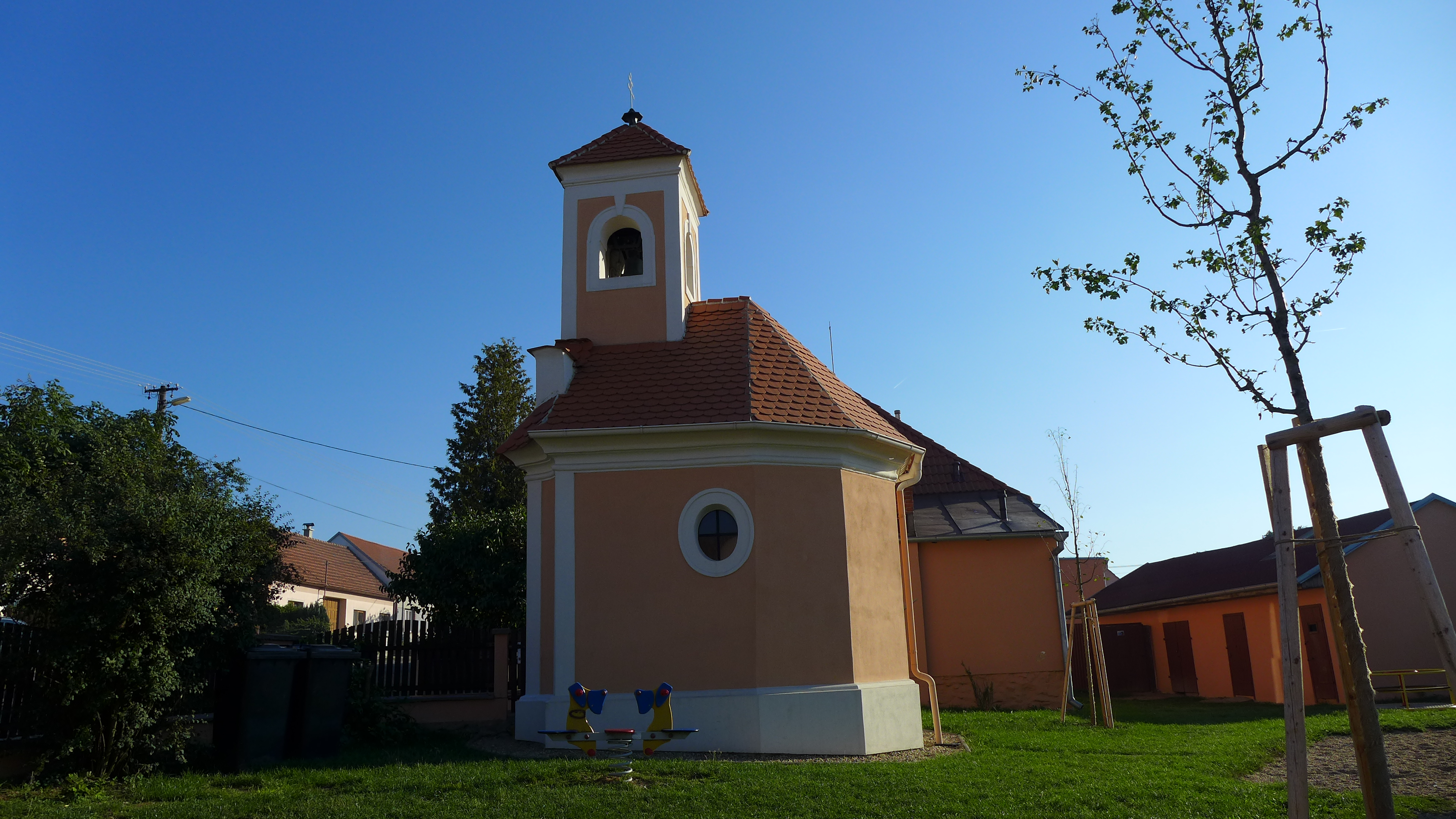
- Chapel of Saint John of Nepomuk

- Flag Coat of arms

- Location in the Czech Republic
- Coordinates: 48°58′57″N 15°51′36″E
- Country: Czech Republic
- Region: South Moravian
- District: Znojmo
- First mentioned: 1365

Area
  - Total: 12.66 km^{2} (4.89 sq mi)
- Elevation: 388 m (1,273 ft)

Population (2026-01-01)
  - Total: 284
  - Density: 22.4/km^{2} (58.1/sq mi)
- Time zone: UTC+1 (CET)
  - Summer (DST): UTC+2 (CEST)
- Postal code: 671 54
- Website: www.ctidruzice.cz

Ctidružice is a municipality and village in Znojmo District in the South Moravian Region of the Czech Republic. It has about 300 inhabitants.

Ctidružice lies approximately 19 kilometres (12 mi) north-west of Znojmo, 62 km (39 mi) south-west of Brno, and 162 km (101 mi) south-east of Prague.

== History ==
The first written mention of Ctidružice is from 1365.

== Demographics ==
Historical population
Year	Pop.	±%
1869	437	—
1880	446	+2.1%
1890	486	+9.0%
1900	504	+3.7%
1910	502	−0.4%
1921	536	+6.8%
1930	554	+3.4%
1950	442	−20.2%
1961	466	+5.4%
1970	457	−1.9%
1980	428	−6.3%
1991	374	−12.6%
2001	345	−7.8%
2011	325	−5.8%
2021	283	−12.9%
Source: Censuses
