= Blanné =

- Municipality
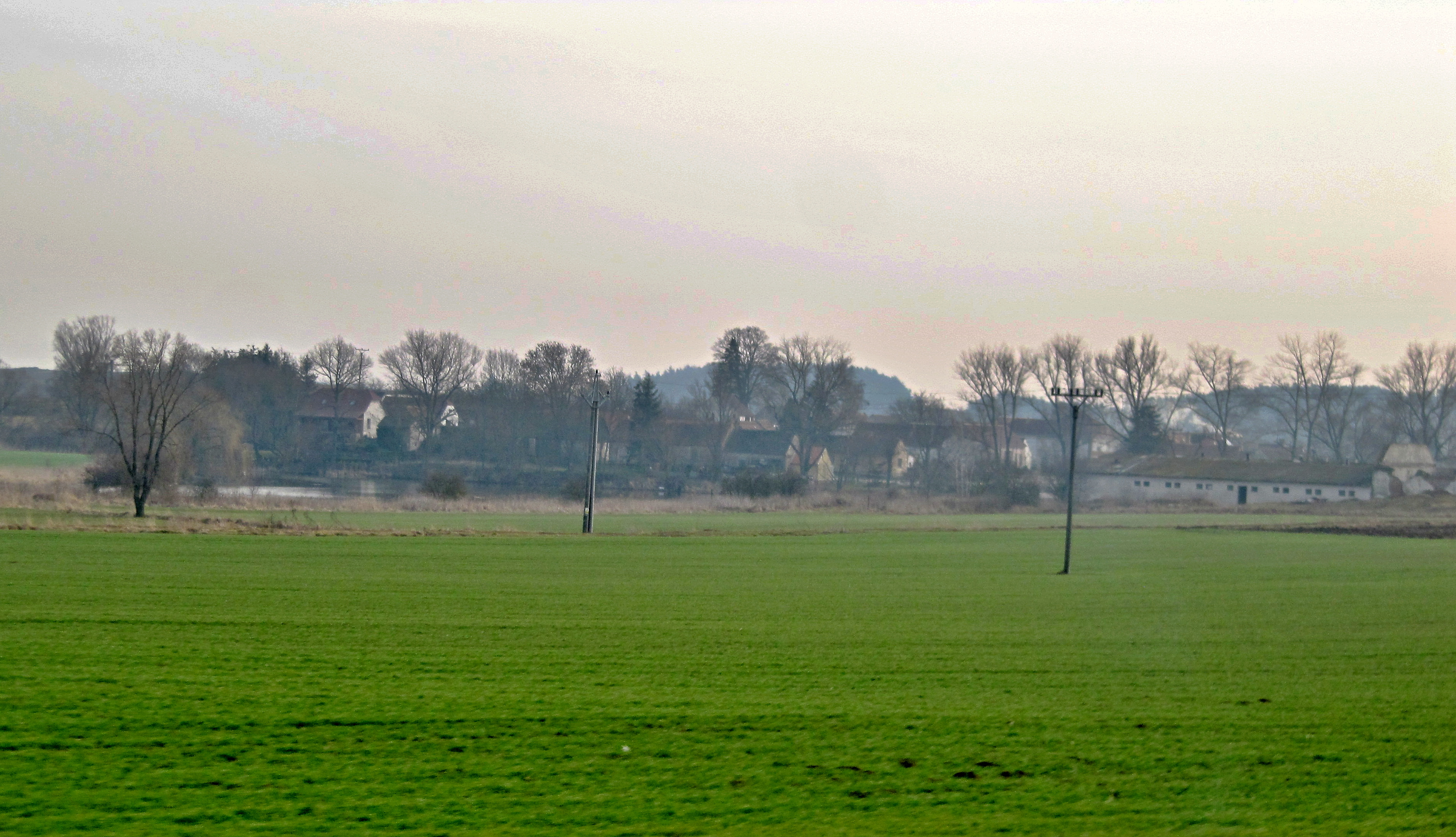
- View from the west

- Flag Coat of arms

- Location in the Czech Republic
- Coordinates: 48°59′31″N 15°53′0″E
- Country: Czech Republic
- Region: South Moravian
- District: Znojmo
- First mentioned: 1738

Area
  - Total: 2.47 km^{2} (0.95 sq mi)
- Elevation: 382 m (1,253 ft)

Population (2026-01-01)
  - Total: 77
  - Density: 31/km^{2} (81/sq mi)
- Time zone: UTC+1 (CET)
  - Summer (DST): UTC+2 (CEST)
- Postal code: 671 54
- Website: www.blanne.cz

Blanné is a municipality and village in Znojmo District in the South Moravian Region of the Czech Republic. It has about 80 inhabitants.

Blanné lies approximately 20 kilometres (12 mi) north-west of Znojmo, 59 km (37 mi) south-west of Brno, and 161 km (100 mi) south-east of Prague.

== Demographics ==
Historical population
Year	Pop.	±%
1869	163	—
1880	131	−19.6%
1890	123	−6.1%
1900	178	+44.7%
1910	163	−8.4%
1921	150	−8.0%
1930	167	+11.3%
1950	119	−28.7%
1961	119	+0.0%
1970	118	−0.8%
1980	124	+5.1%
1991	94	−24.2%
2001	94	+0.0%
2011	85	−9.6%
2021	76	−10.6%
Source: Censuses
