= Milíčovice =

- Municipality
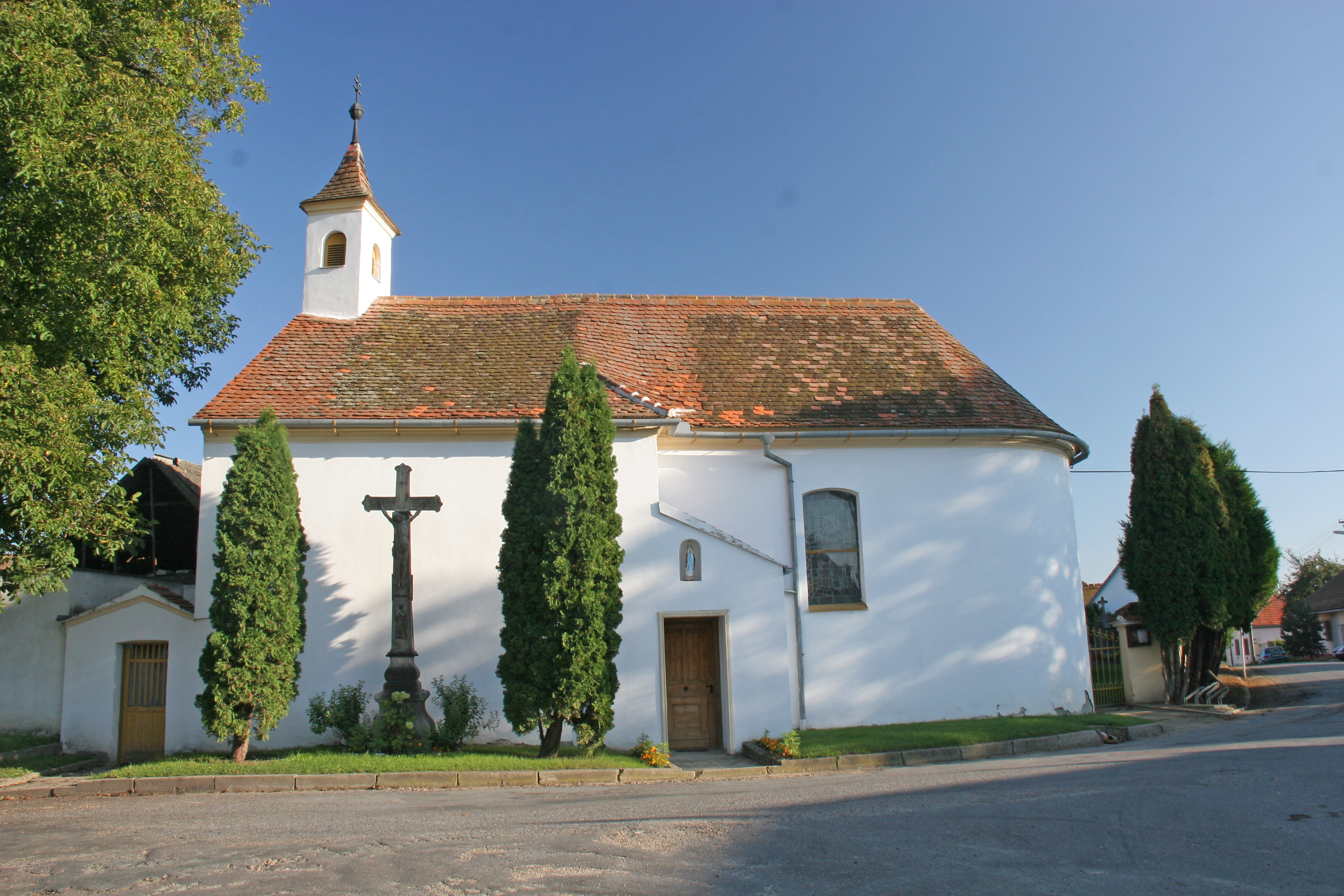
- Church of the Assumption of the Virgin Mary

- Flag Coat of arms

- Location in the Czech Republic
- Coordinates: 48°53′30″N 15°55′56″E
- Country: Czech Republic
- Region: South Moravian
- District: Znojmo
- First mentioned: 1349

Area
  - Total: 6.94 km^{2} (2.68 sq mi)
- Elevation: 391 m (1,283 ft)

Population (2026-01-01)
  - Total: 201
  - Density: 29.0/km^{2} (75.0/sq mi)
- Time zone: UTC+1 (CET)
  - Summer (DST): UTC+2 (CEST)
- Postal code: 669 02
- Website: www.milicovice.cz

Milíčovice (German: Mülschütz) is a municipality and village in Znojmo District in the South Moravian Region of the Czech Republic. It has about 200 inhabitants.

Milíčovice lies approximately 9 kilometres (6 mi) north-west of Znojmo, 60 km (37 mi) south-west of Brno, and 172 km (107 mi) south-east of Prague.

== Demographics ==
Historical population
Year	Pop.	±%
1869	332	—
1880	333	+0.3%
1890	302	−9.3%
1900	320	+6.0%
1910	307	−4.1%
1921	300	−2.3%
1930	319	+6.3%
1950	277	−13.2%
1961	265	−4.3%
1970	259	−2.3%
1980	230	−11.2%
1991	210	−8.7%
2001	209	−0.5%
2011	222	+6.2%
2021	202	−9.0%
Source: Censuses
