= Našiměřice =

- Municipality
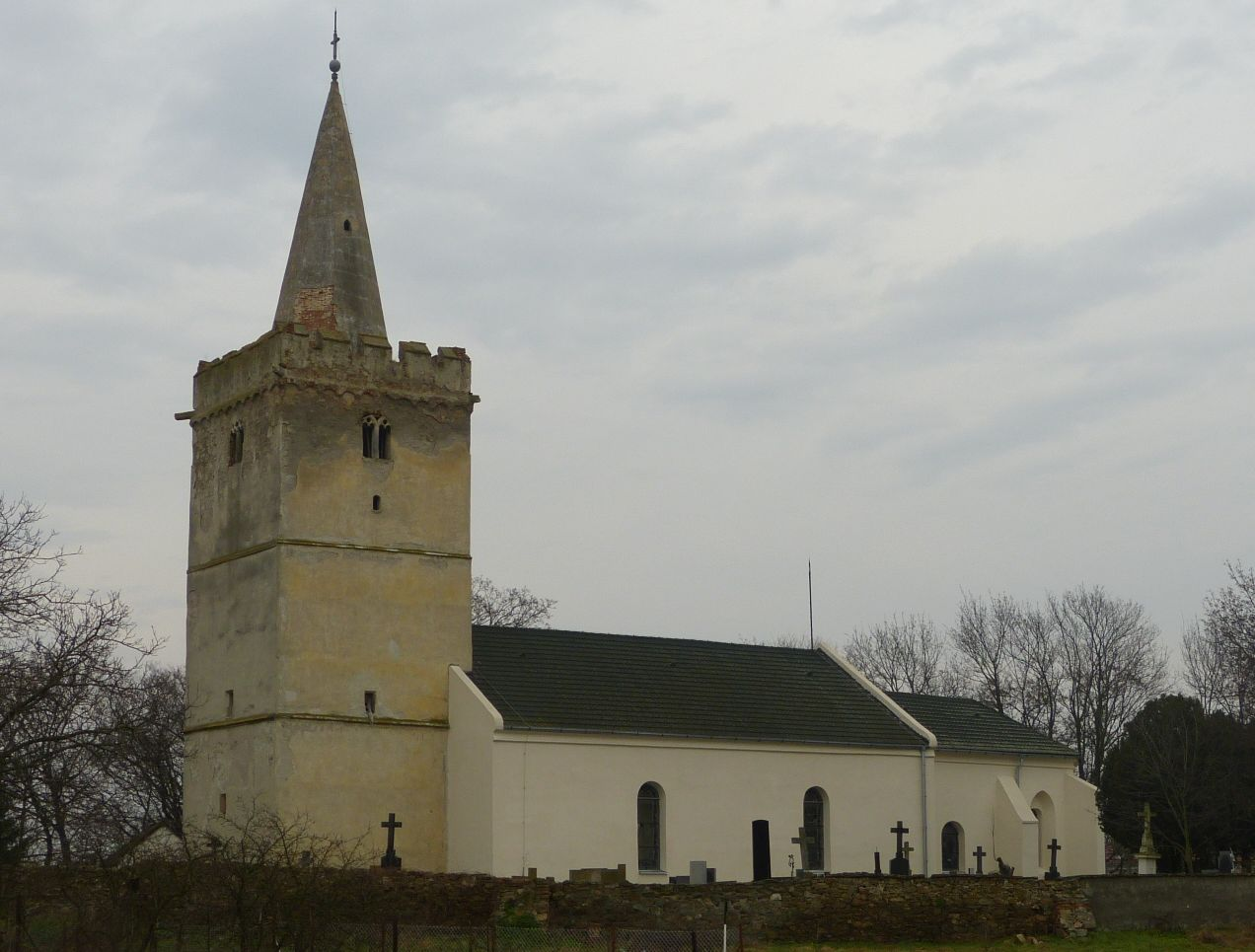
- Church of Saint Giles

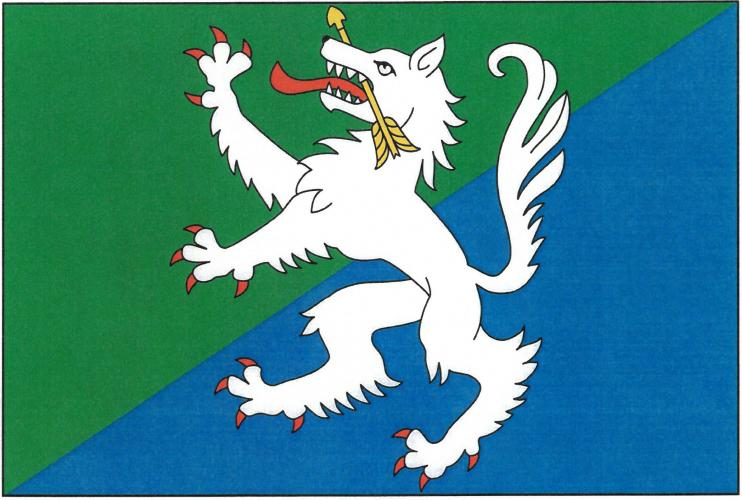
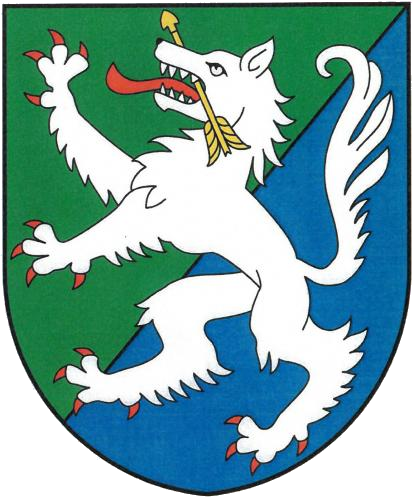
- Flag Coat of arms

- Location in the Czech Republic
- Coordinates: 48°58′7″N 16°22′22″E
- Country: Czech Republic
- Region: South Moravian
- District: Znojmo
- First mentioned: 1236

Area
  - Total: 6.02 km^{2} (2.32 sq mi)
- Elevation: 217 m (712 ft)

Population (2026-01-01)
  - Total: 200
  - Density: 33/km^{2} (86/sq mi)
- Time zone: UTC+1 (CET)
  - Summer (DST): UTC+2 (CEST)
- Postal code: 671 76
- Website: www.nasimerice.cz

Našiměřice (German: Aschmeritz) is a municipality and village in Znojmo District in the South Moravian Region of the Czech Republic. It has about 200 inhabitants.

Našiměřice lies approximately 28 kilometres (17 mi) north-east of Znojmo, 32 km (20 mi) south-west of Brno, and 189 km (117 mi) south-east of Prague.

== Demographics ==
Historical population
Year	Pop.	±%
1869	441	—
1880	455	+3.2%
1890	418	−8.1%
1900	470	+12.4%
1910	482	+2.6%
1921	448	−7.1%
1930	457	+2.0%
1950	302	−33.9%
1961	361	+19.5%
1970	296	−18.0%
1980	279	−5.7%
1991	225	−19.4%
2001	211	−6.2%
2011	195	−7.6%
2021	179	−8.2%
Source: Censuses
