= Bezkov =

- Municipality
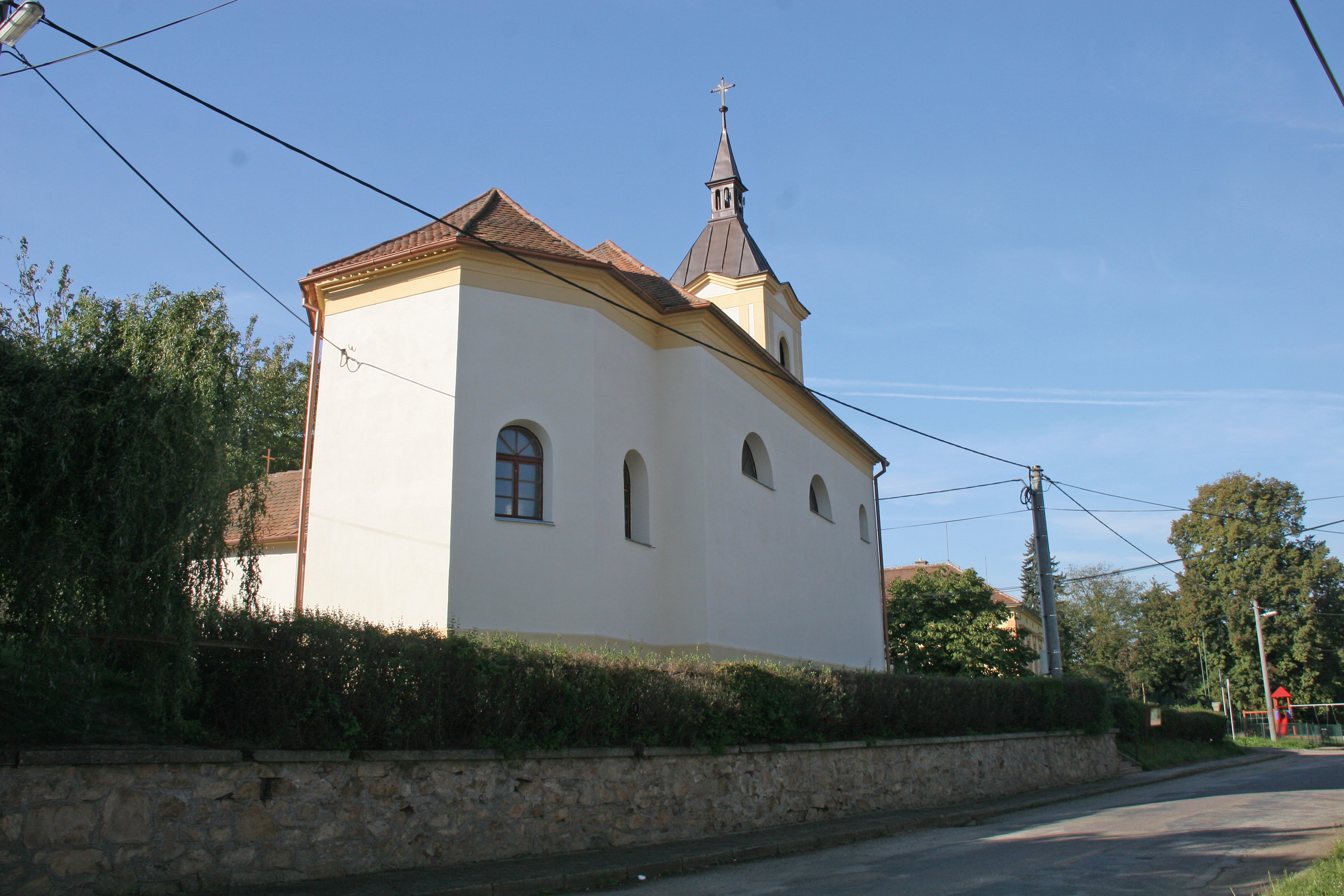
- Chapel of the Virgin Mary

- Flag Coat of arms

- Location in the Czech Republic
- Coordinates: 48°52′17″N 15°57′5″E
- Country: Czech Republic
- Region: South Moravian
- District: Znojmo
- First mentioned: 1252

Area
  - Total: 5.64 km^{2} (2.18 sq mi)
- Elevation: 385 m (1,263 ft)

Population (2026-01-01)
  - Total: 229
  - Density: 40.6/km^{2} (105/sq mi)
- Time zone: UTC+1 (CET)
  - Summer (DST): UTC+2 (CEST)
- Postal code: 669 02
- Website: www.bezkov.cz

Bezkov (Czech pronunciation: [ˈbɛskof]) is a municipality and village in Znojmo District in the South Moravian Region of the Czech Republic. It has about 200 inhabitants.

Bezkov lies approximately 7 kilometres (4 mi) west of Znojmo, 61 km (38 mi) south-west of Brno, and 175 km (109 mi) south-east of Prague.

== Demographics ==
Historical population
| Year | Pop. | ±% |
|---|---|---|
| 1869 | 257 | — |
| 1880 | 239 | −7.0% |
| 1890 | 272 | +13.8% |
| 1900 | 295 | +8.5% |
| 1910 | 291 | −1.4% |
| 1921 | 259 | −11.0% |
| 1930 | 274 | +5.8% |
| 1950 | 276 | +0.7% |
| 1961 | 260 | −5.8% |
| 1970 | 242 | −6.9% |
| 1980 | 212 | −12.4% |
| 1991 | 194 | −8.5% |
| 2001 | 206 | +6.2% |
| 2011 | 204 | −1.0% |
| 2021 | 207 | +1.5% |
Source: Censuses
