= Přeskače =

- Municipality
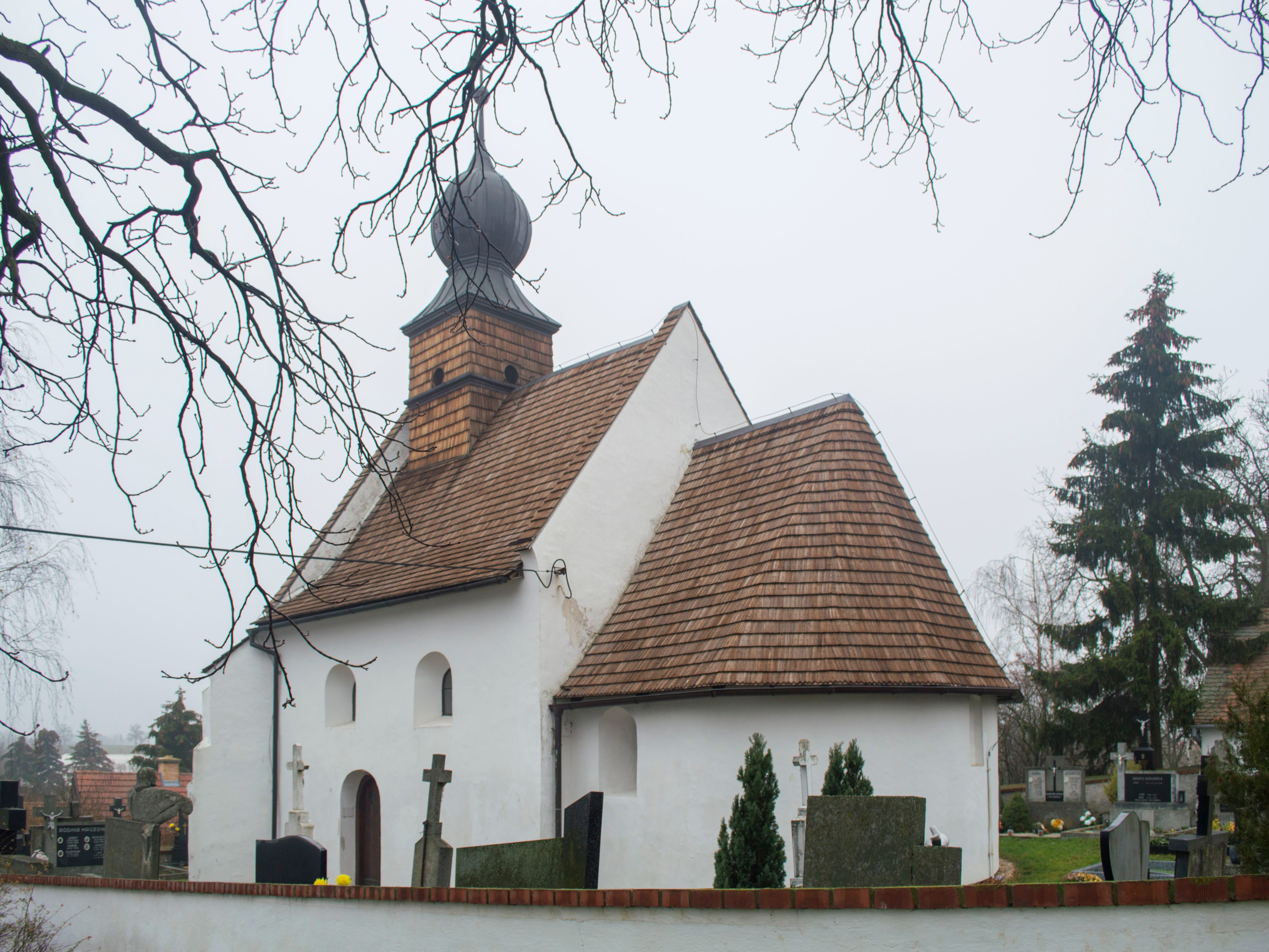
- Church of All Saints

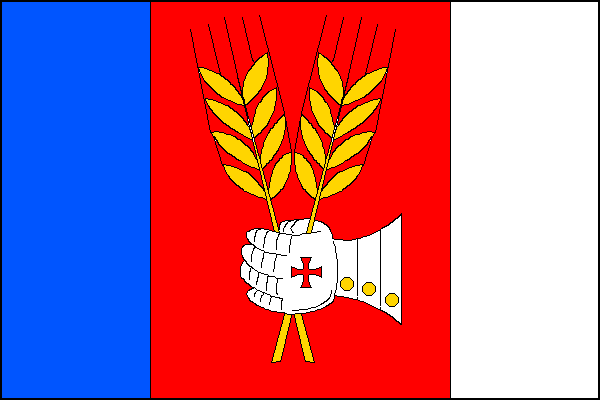
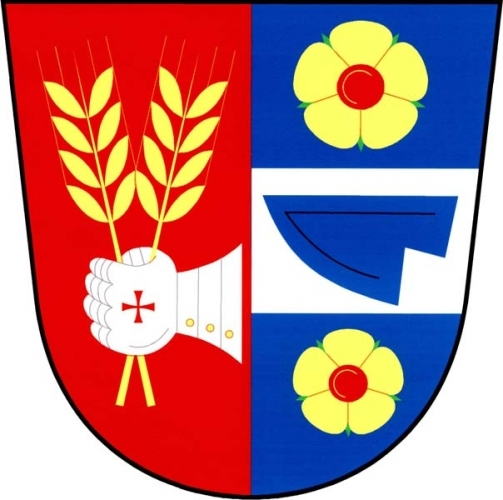
- Flag Coat of arms

- Location in the Czech Republic
- Coordinates: 49°0′45″N 16°6′25″E
- Country: Czech Republic
- Region: South Moravian
- District: Znojmo
- First mentioned: 1279

Area
  - Total: 4.92 km^{2} (1.90 sq mi)
- Elevation: 366 m (1,201 ft)

Population (2026-01-01)
  - Total: 100
  - Density: 20/km^{2} (53/sq mi)
- Time zone: UTC+1 (CET)
  - Summer (DST): UTC+2 (CEST)
- Postal code: 671 40
- Website: www.obecpreskace.cz

Přeskače is a municipality and village in Znojmo District in the South Moravian Region of the Czech Republic. It has about 100 inhabitants.

Přeskače lies approximately 19 kilometres (12 mi) north of Znojmo, 43 km (27 mi) south-west of Brno, and 171 km (106 mi) south-east of Prague.

== Demographics ==
Historical population
Year	Pop.	±%
1869	196	—
1880	213	+8.7%
1890	192	−9.9%
1900	206	+7.3%
1910	239	+16.0%
1921	216	−9.6%
1930	220	+1.9%
1950	170	−22.7%
1961	181	+6.5%
1970	157	−13.3%
1980	125	−20.4%
1991	112	−10.4%
2001	101	−9.8%
2011	106	+5.0%
2021	95	−10.4%
Source: Censuses
