= Dolní Dubňany =

- Municipality
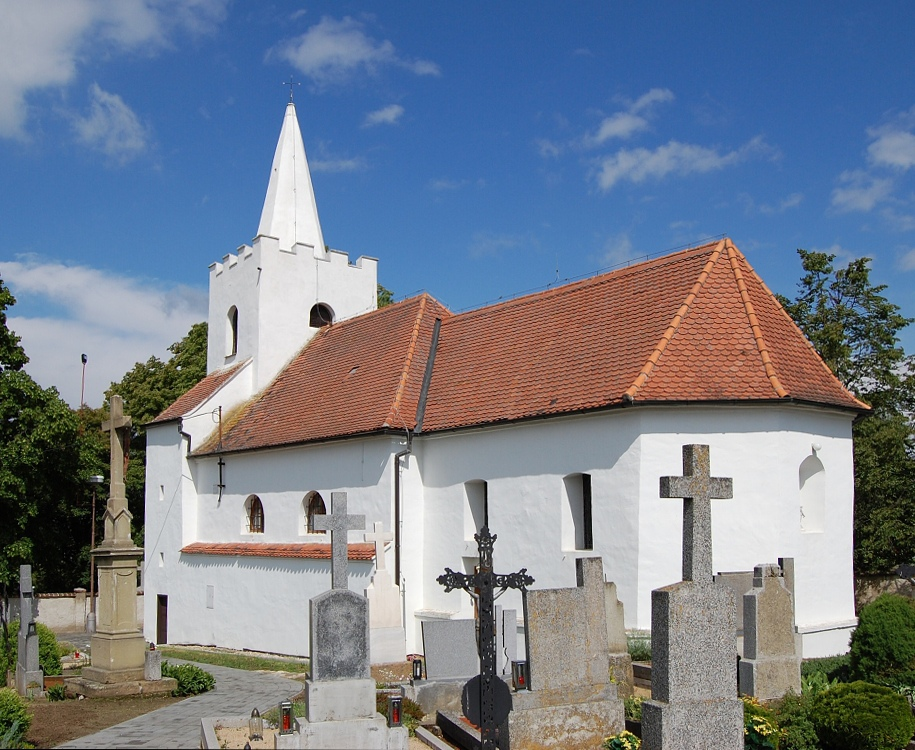
- Church of Saint Wenceslaus

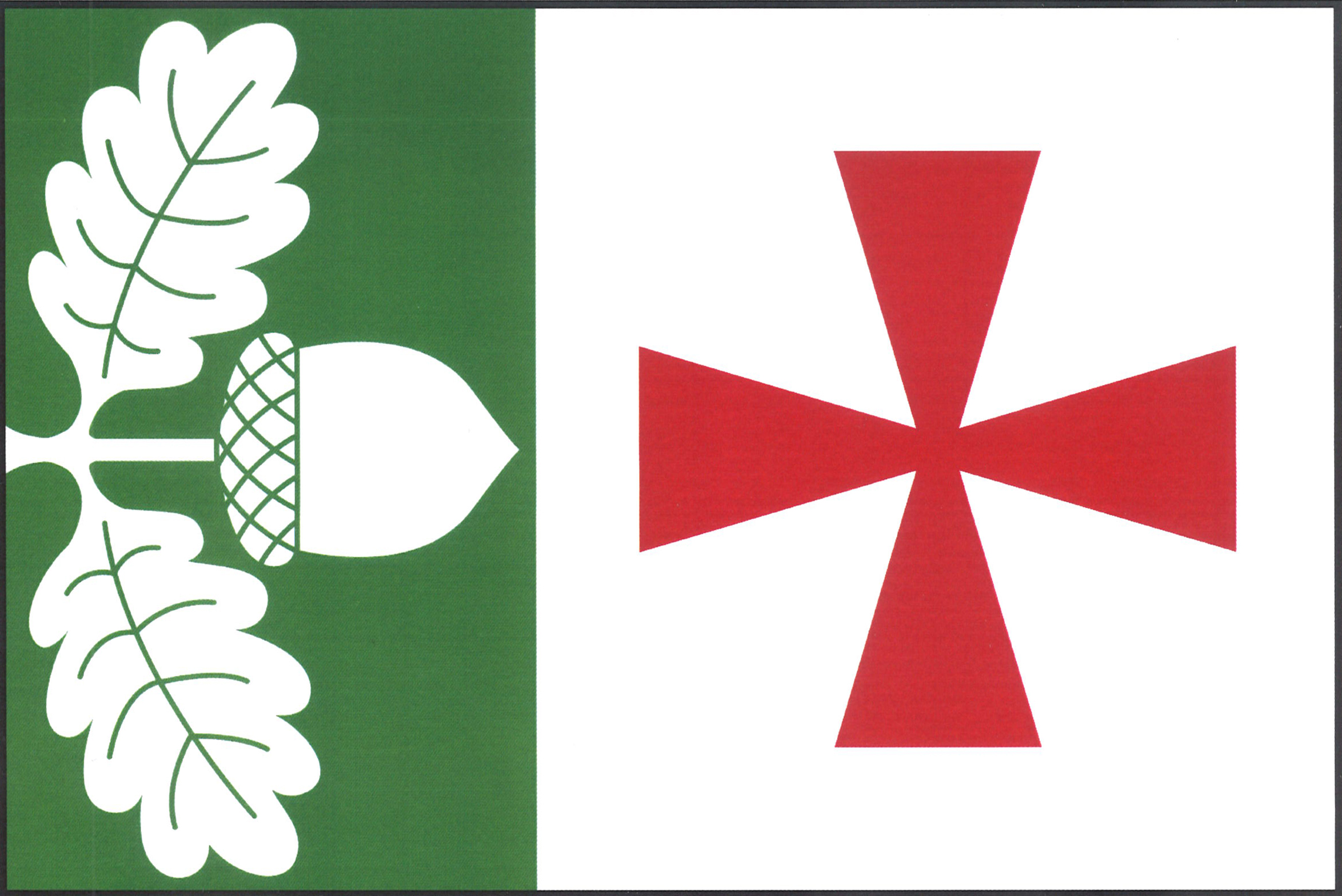
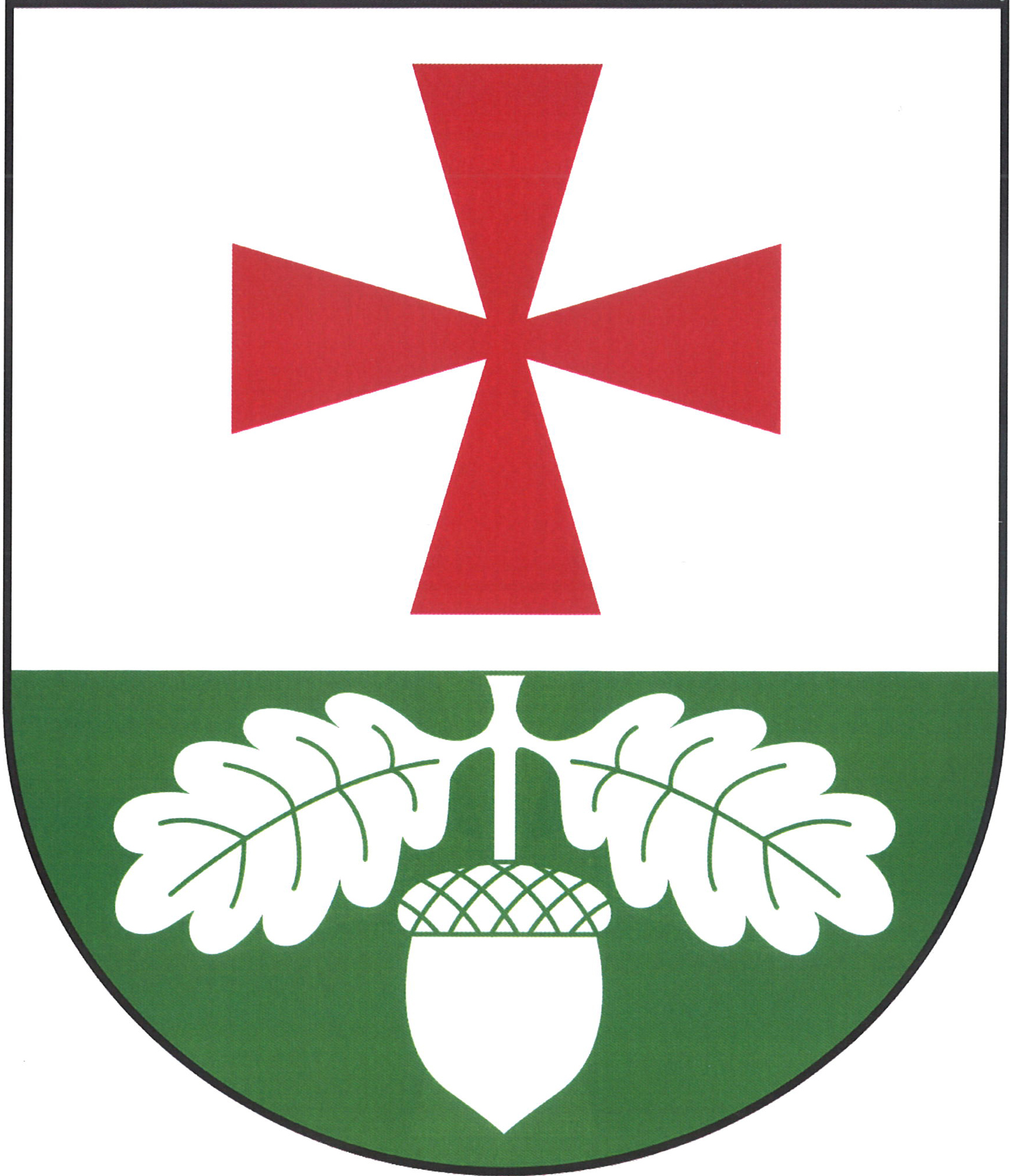
- Flag Coat of arms

- Location in the Czech Republic
- Coordinates: 49°3′21″N 16°13′36″E
- Country: Czech Republic
- Region: South Moravian
- District: Znojmo
- First mentioned: 1351

Area
  - Total: 8.12 km^{2} (3.14 sq mi)
- Elevation: 309 m (1,014 ft)

Population (2026-01-01)
  - Total: 486
  - Density: 59.9/km^{2} (155/sq mi)
- Time zone: UTC+1 (CET)
  - Summer (DST): UTC+2 (CEST)
- Postal code: 671 73
- Website: www.dolnidubnany.cz

Dolní Dubňany is a municipality and village in Znojmo District in the South Moravian Region of the Czech Republic. It has about 500 inhabitants.

Dolní Dubňany lies approximately 27 kilometres (17 mi) north-east of Znojmo, 33 km (21 mi) south-west of Brno, and 174 km (108 mi) south-east of Prague.

== Demographics ==
Historical population
Year	Pop.	±%
1869	441	—
1880	426	−3.4%
1890	480	+12.7%
1900	523	+9.0%
1910	539	+3.1%
1921	605	+12.2%
1930	626	+3.5%
1950	477	−23.8%
1961	503	+5.5%
1970	486	−3.4%
1980	506	+4.1%
1991	482	−4.7%
2001	469	−2.7%
2011	478	+1.9%
2021	479	+0.2%
Source: Censuses
