= Horní Dubňany =

- Municipality
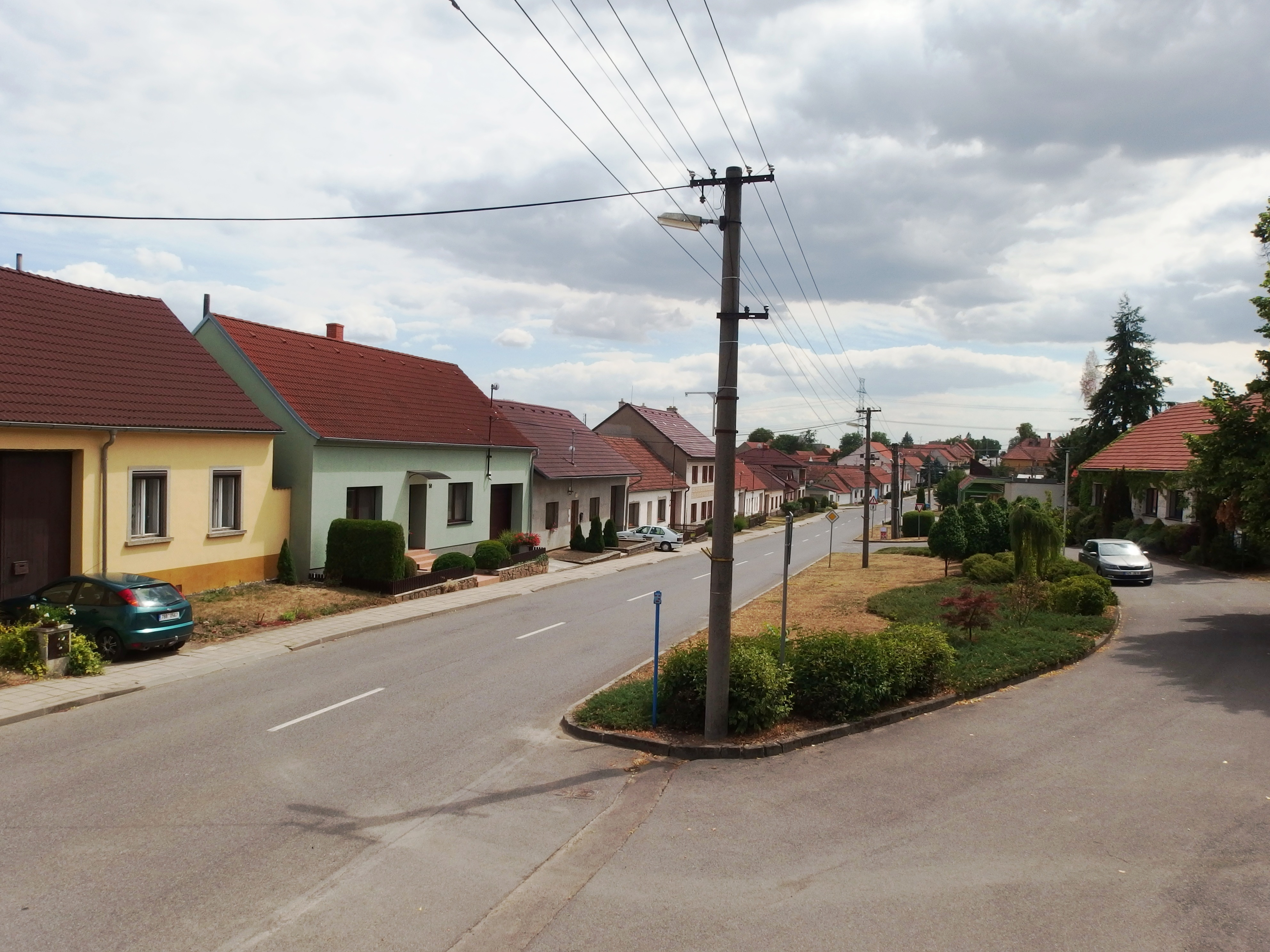
- Centre of Horní Dubňany

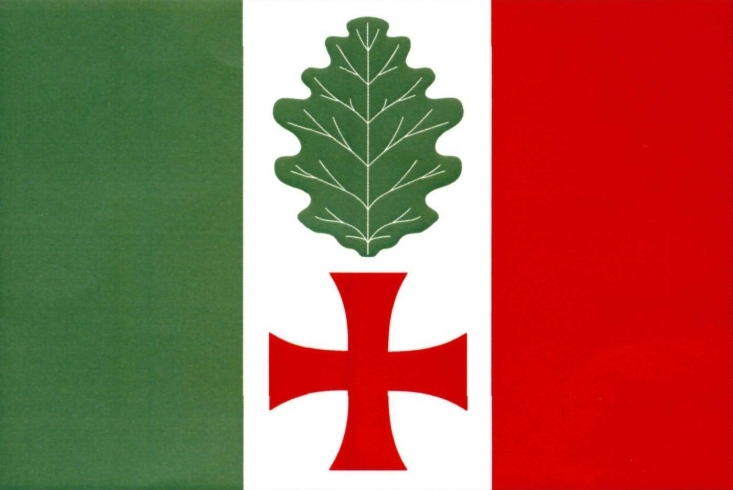
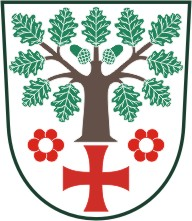
- Flag Coat of arms

- Location in the Czech Republic
- Coordinates: 49°3′48″N 16°12′5″E
- Country: Czech Republic
- Region: South Moravian
- District: Znojmo
- First mentioned: 1279

Area
  - Total: 6.74 km^{2} (2.60 sq mi)
- Elevation: 348 m (1,142 ft)

Population (2026-01-01)
  - Total: 285
  - Density: 42.3/km^{2} (110/sq mi)
- Time zone: UTC+1 (CET)
  - Summer (DST): UTC+2 (CEST)
- Postal code: 671 73
- Website: www.hornidubnany.cz

Horní Dubňany is a municipality and village in Znojmo District in the South Moravian Region of the Czech Republic. It has about 300 inhabitants.

Horní Dubňany lies approximately 27 kilometres (17 mi) north-east of Znojmo, 35 km (22 mi) south-west of Brno, and 172 km (107 mi) south-east of Prague.

== Demographics ==
Historical population
Year	Pop.	±%
1869	423	—
1880	478	+13.0%
1890	530	+10.9%
1900	526	−0.8%
1910	521	−1.0%
1921	511	−1.9%
1930	510	−0.2%
1950	450	−11.8%
1961	423	−6.0%
1970	392	−7.3%
1980	371	−5.4%
1991	309	−16.7%
2001	316	+2.3%
2011	292	−7.6%
2021	277	−5.1%
Source: Censuses
