= Pravice =

- Municipality
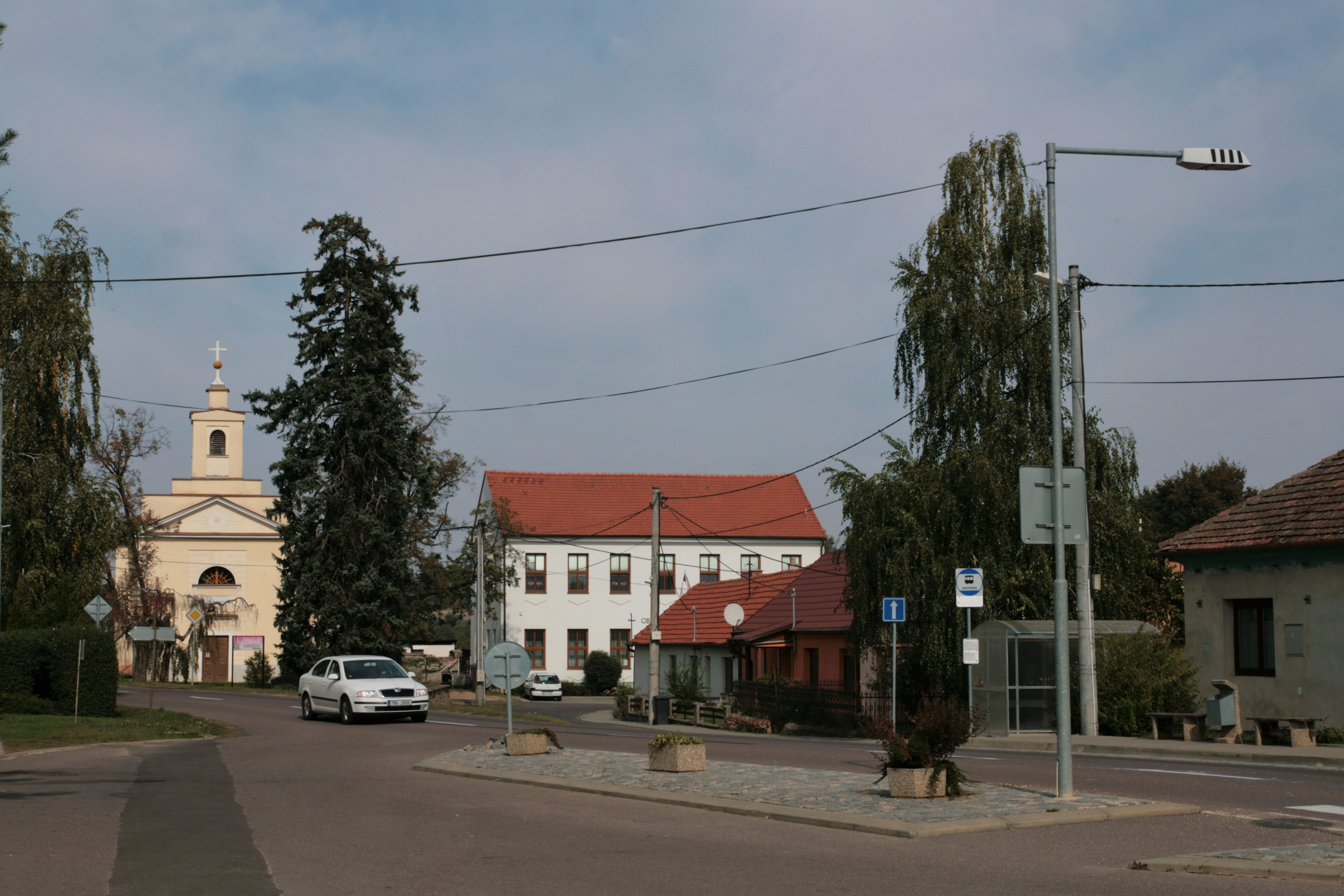
- Centre of Pravice

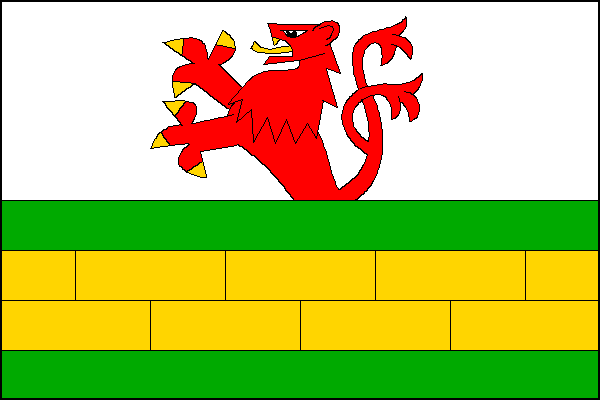
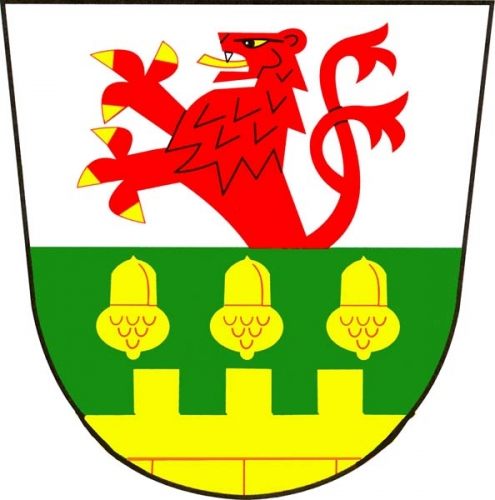
- Flag Coat of arms

- Location in the Czech Republic
- Coordinates: 48°50′36″N 16°21′40″E
- Country: Czech Republic
- Region: South Moravian
- District: Znojmo
- First mentioned: 1222

Area
  - Total: 9.93 km^{2} (3.83 sq mi)
- Elevation: 187 m (614 ft)

Population (2026-01-01)
  - Total: 370
  - Density: 37/km^{2} (97/sq mi)
- Time zone: UTC+1 (CET)
  - Summer (DST): UTC+2 (CEST)
- Postal code: 671 78
- Website: www.obecpravice.cz

Pravice is a municipality and village in Znojmo District in the South Moravian Region of the Czech Republic. It has about 400 inhabitants.

Pravice lies approximately 24 kilometres (15 mi) east of Znojmo, 44 km (27 mi) south-west of Brno, and 197 km (122 mi) south-east of Prague.

== Demographics ==
Historical population
Year	Pop.	±%
1869	609	—
1880	658	+8.0%
1890	704	+7.0%
1900	742	+5.4%
1910	745	+0.4%
1921	781	+4.8%
1930	879	+12.5%
1950	443	−49.6%
1961	438	−1.1%
1970	392	−10.5%
1980	335	−14.5%
1991	281	−16.1%
2001	316	+12.5%
2011	308	−2.5%
2021	360	+16.9%
Source: Censuses
