= Vedrovice =

- Municipality
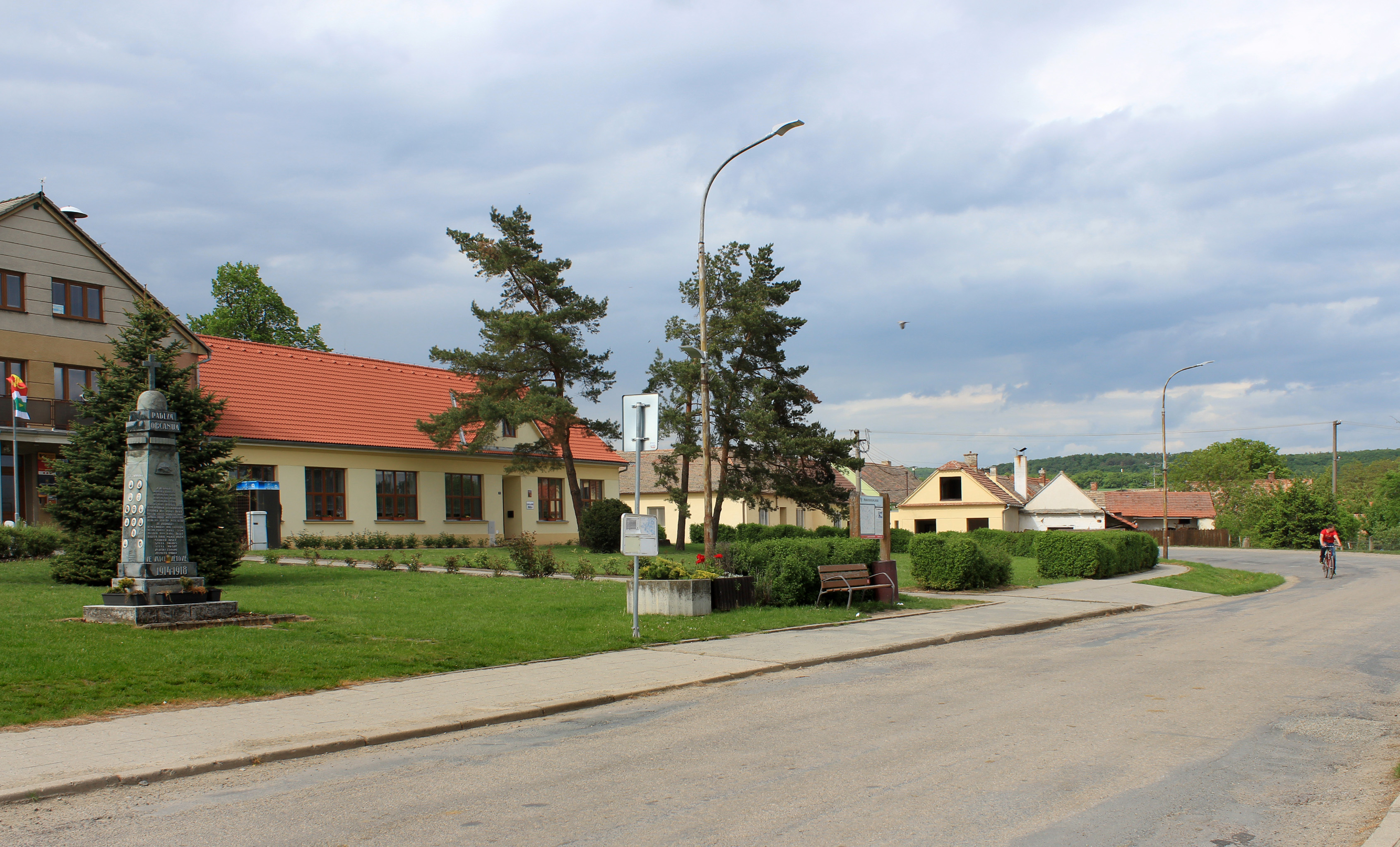
- Centre of Vedrovice

- Flag Coat of arms

- Location in the Czech Republic
- Coordinates: 49°1′15″N 16°22′43″E
- Country: Czech Republic
- Region: South Moravian
- District: Znojmo
- First mentioned: 1369

Area
  - Total: 7.58 km^{2} (2.93 sq mi)
- Elevation: 256 m (840 ft)

Population (2026-01-01)
  - Total: 914
  - Density: 121/km^{2} (312/sq mi)
- Time zone: UTC+1 (CET)
  - Summer (DST): UTC+2 (CEST)
- Postal code: 671 75
- Website: vedrovice.cz

Vedrovice is a municipality and village in Znojmo District in the South Moravian Region of the Czech Republic. It has about 900 inhabitants.

Vedrovice lies approximately 32 kilometres (20 mi) north-east of Znojmo, 27 km (17 mi) south-west of Brno, and 185 km (115 mi) south-east of Prague.

== Demographics ==
Historical population
Year	Pop.	±%
1869	590	—
1880	651	+10.3%
1890	738	+13.4%
1900	803	+8.8%
1910	818	+1.9%
1921	833	+1.8%
1930	920	+10.4%
1950	824	−10.4%
1961	959	+16.4%
1970	882	−8.0%
1980	849	−3.7%
1991	802	−5.5%
2001	819	+2.1%
2011	810	−1.1%
2021	861	+6.3%
Source: Censuses
