= Korolupy =

- Municipality
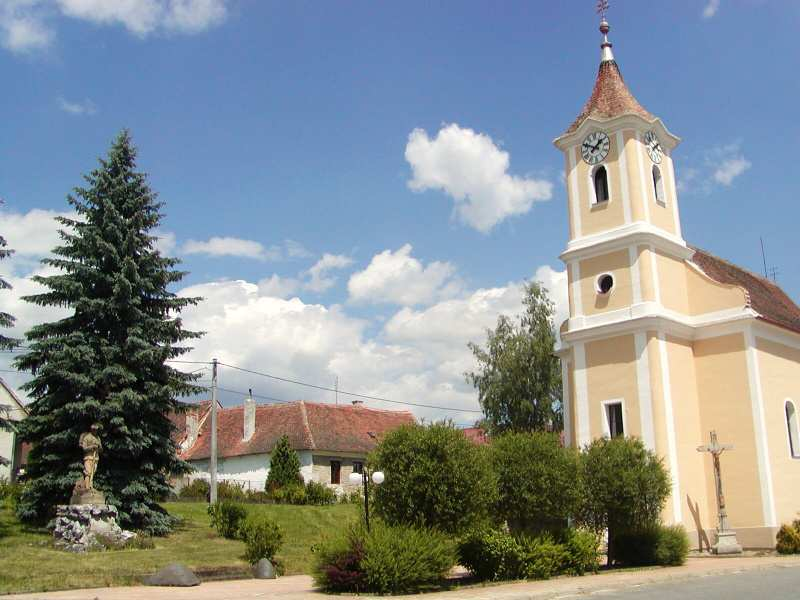
- Church of Saint Lawrence

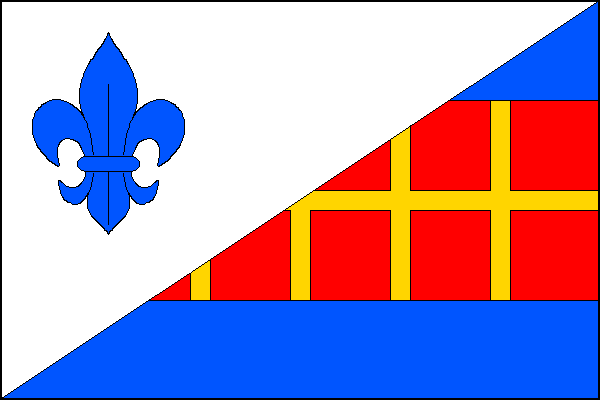
- Flag Coat of arms

- Location in the Czech Republic
- Coordinates: 48°55′49″N 15°38′46″E
- Country: Czech Republic
- Region: South Moravian
- District: Znojmo
- First mentioned: 1371

Area
  - Total: 15.45 km^{2} (5.97 sq mi)
- Elevation: 433 m (1,421 ft)

Population (2026-01-01)
  - Total: 155
  - Density: 10.0/km^{2} (26.0/sq mi)
- Time zone: UTC+1 (CET)
  - Summer (DST): UTC+2 (CEST)
- Postal code: 671 07
- Website: www.obec-korolupy.cz

Korolupy (German: Kurlupp) is a municipality and village in Znojmo District in the South Moravian Region of the Czech Republic. It has about 200 inhabitants.

Korolupy lies approximately 29 kilometres (18 mi) west of Znojmo, 77 km (48 mi) south-west of Brno, and 158 km (98 mi) south-east of Prague.

== Demographics ==
Historical population
| Year | Pop. | ±% |
|---|---|---|
| 1869 | 339 | — |
| 1880 | 366 | +8.0% |
| 1890 | 362 | −1.1% |
| 1900 | 374 | +3.3% |
| 1910 | 406 | +8.6% |
| 1921 | 462 | +13.8% |
| 1930 | 432 | −6.5% |
| 1950 | 346 | −19.9% |
| 1961 | 317 | −8.4% |
| 1970 | 281 | −11.4% |
| 1980 | 246 | −12.5% |
| 1991 | 237 | −3.7% |
| 2001 | 205 | −13.5% |
| 2011 | 178 | −13.2% |
| 2021 | 145 | −18.5% |
Source: Censuses
