= Plenkovice =

- Municipality
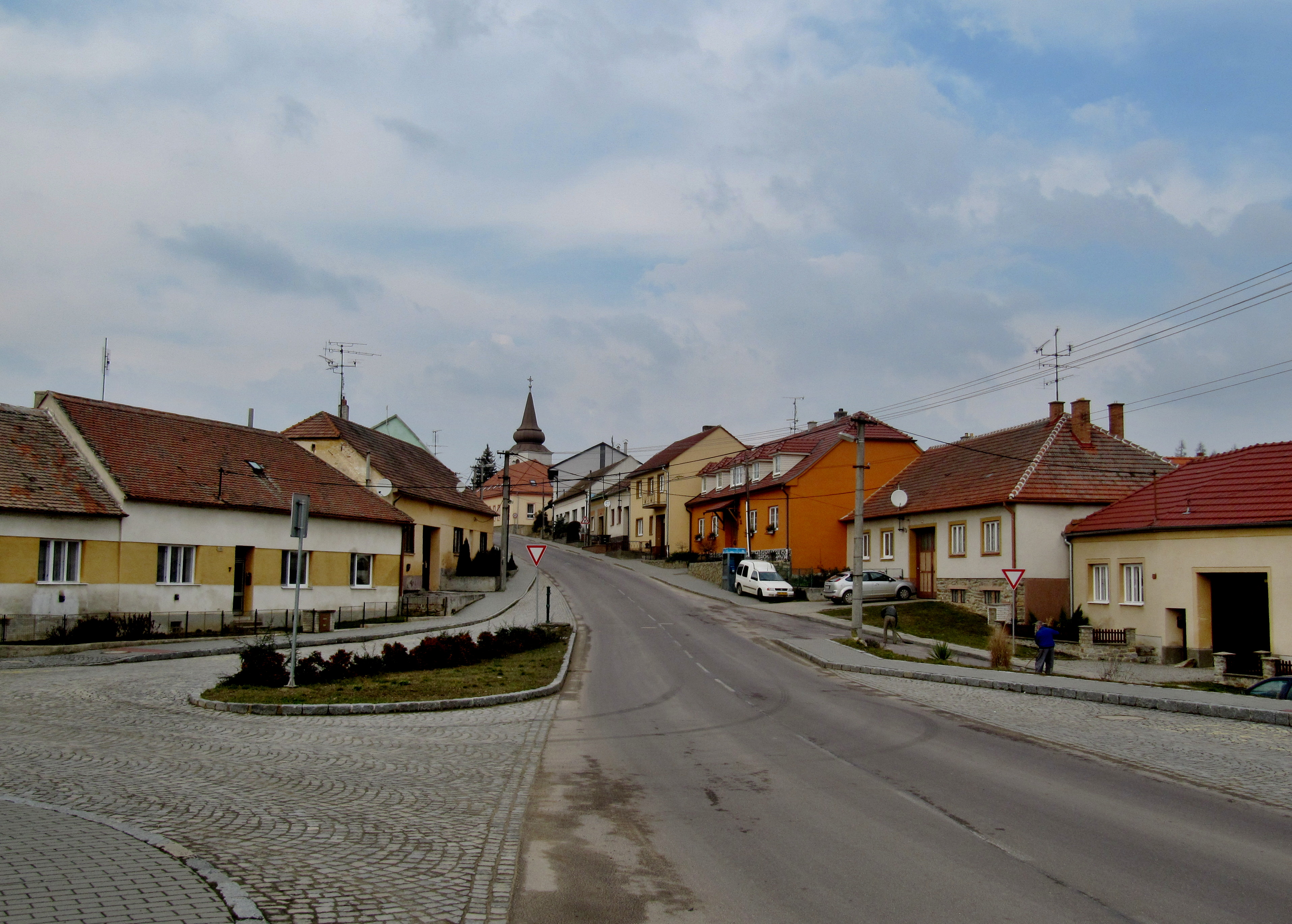
- Main street

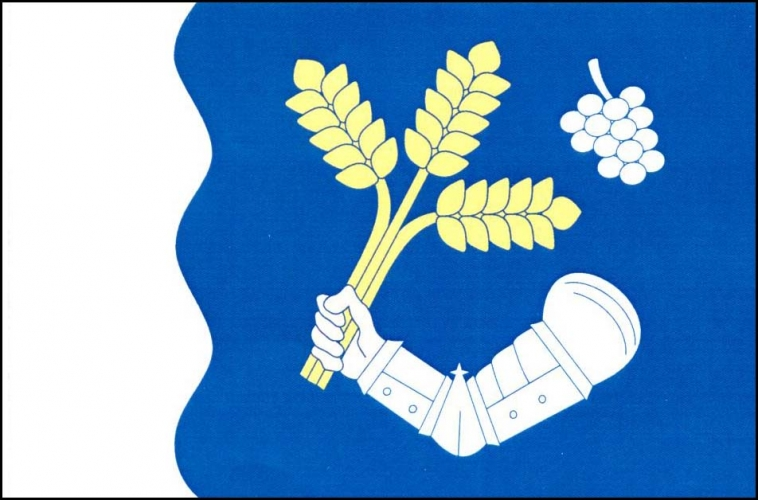
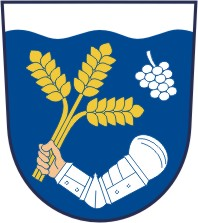
- Flag Coat of arms

- Location in the Czech Republic
- Coordinates: 48°55′8″N 16°0′9″E
- Country: Czech Republic
- Region: South Moravian
- District: Znojmo
- First mentioned: 1343

Area
  - Total: 4.37 km^{2} (1.69 sq mi)
- Elevation: 316 m (1,037 ft)

Population (2026-01-01)
  - Total: 402
  - Density: 92.0/km^{2} (238/sq mi)
- Time zone: UTC+1 (CET)
  - Summer (DST): UTC+2 (CEST)
- Postal code: 671 51
- Website: www.plenkovice.cz

Plenkovice is a municipality and village in Znojmo District in the South Moravian Region of the Czech Republic. It has about 400 inhabitants.

Plenkovice lies approximately 8 kilometres (5 mi) north of Znojmo, 55 km (34 mi) south-west of Brno, and 174 km (108 mi) south-east of Prague.

== Demographics ==
Historical population
| Year | Pop. | ±% |
|---|---|---|
| 1869 | 370 | — |
| 1880 | 380 | +2.7% |
| 1890 | 358 | −5.8% |
| 1900 | 382 | +6.7% |
| 1910 | 413 | +8.1% |
| 1921 | 391 | −5.3% |
| 1930 | 441 | +12.8% |
| 1950 | 417 | −5.4% |
| 1961 | 470 | +12.7% |
| 1970 | 441 | −6.2% |
| 1980 | 414 | −6.1% |
| 1991 | 338 | −18.4% |
| 2001 | 327 | −3.3% |
| 2011 | 350 | +7.0% |
| 2021 | 347 | −0.9% |
Source: Censuses
