= Dobřínsko =

- Municipality
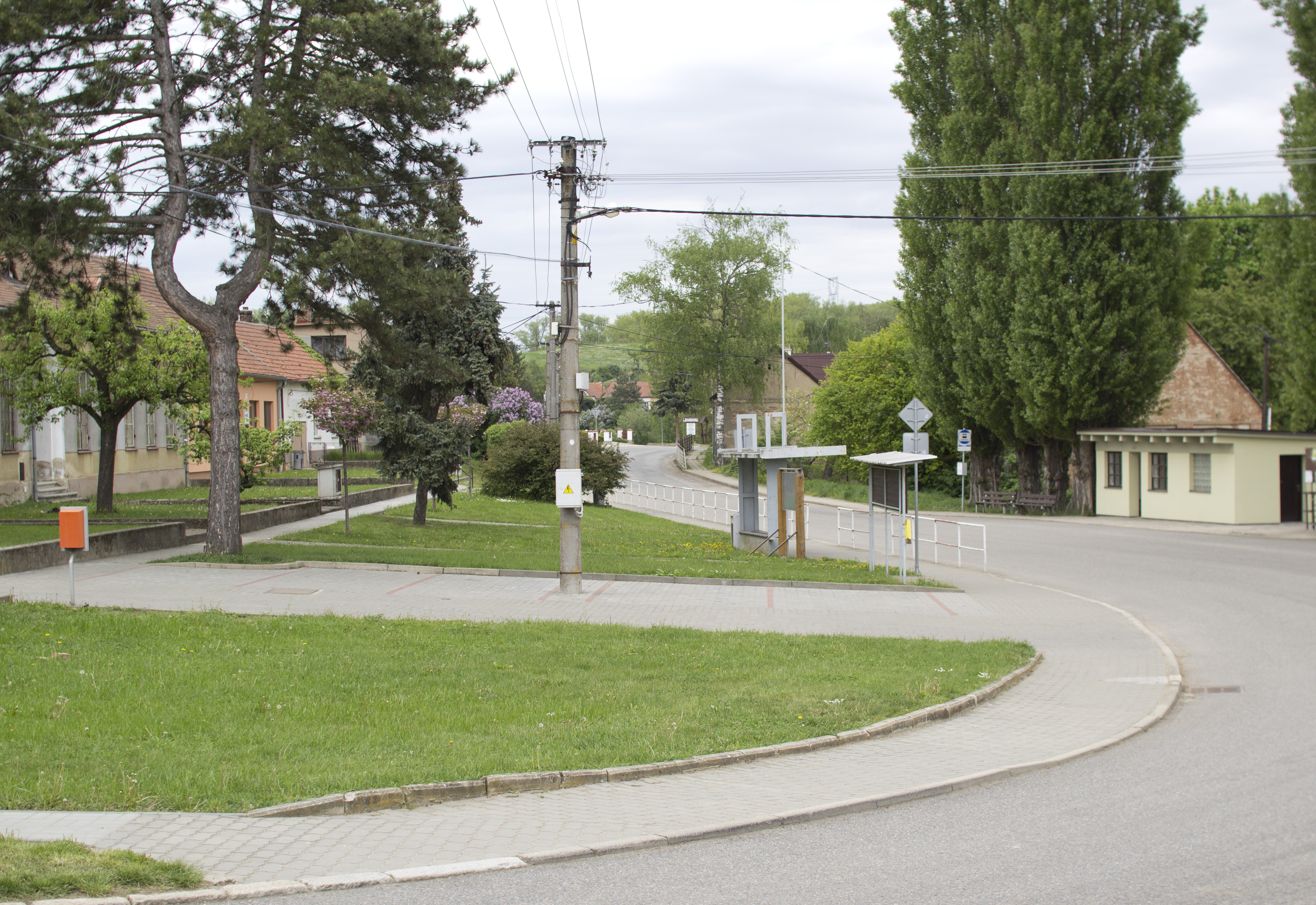
- Centre of Dobřínsko

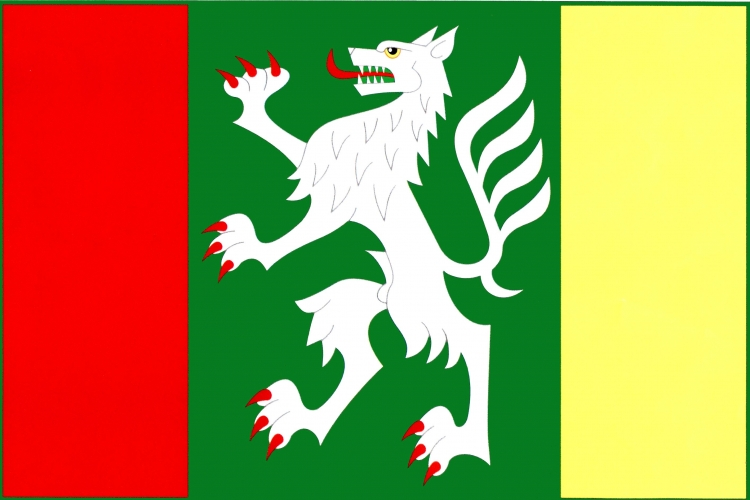
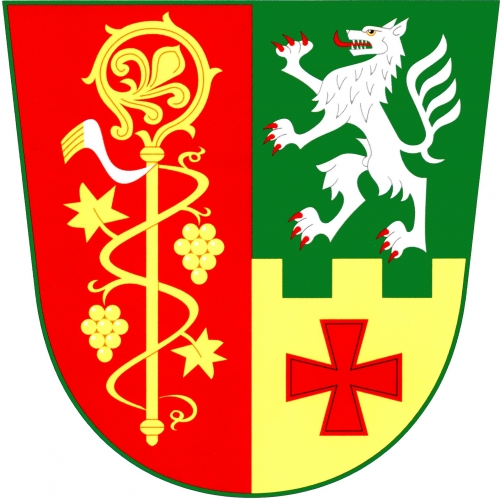
- Flag Coat of arms

- Location in the Czech Republic
- Coordinates: 49°3′8″N 16°15′42″E
- Country: Czech Republic
- Region: South Moravian
- District: Znojmo
- First mentioned: 1131

Area
  - Total: 5.51 km^{2} (2.13 sq mi)
- Elevation: 290 m (950 ft)

Population (2026-01-01)
  - Total: 396
  - Density: 71.9/km^{2} (186/sq mi)
- Time zone: UTC+1 (CET)
  - Summer (DST): UTC+2 (CEST)
- Postal code: 672 01
- Website: www.dobrinsko.eu

Dobřínsko is a municipality and village in Znojmo District in the South Moravian Region of the Czech Republic. It has about 400 inhabitants.

Dobřínsko lies approximately 29 kilometres (18 mi) north-east of Znojmo, 31 km (19 mi) south-west of Brno, and 176 km (109 mi) south-east of Prague.

== Demographics ==
Historical population
Year	Pop.	±%
1869	386	—
1880	417	+8.0%
1890	469	+12.5%
1900	451	−3.8%
1910	456	+1.1%
1921	506	+11.0%
1930	467	−7.7%
1950	420	−10.1%
1961	421	+0.2%
1970	407	−3.3%
1980	390	−4.2%
1991	367	−5.9%
2001	376	+2.5%
2011	384	+2.1%
2021	380	−1.0%
Source: Censuses
