= Skalice (Znojmo District) =

- Municipality
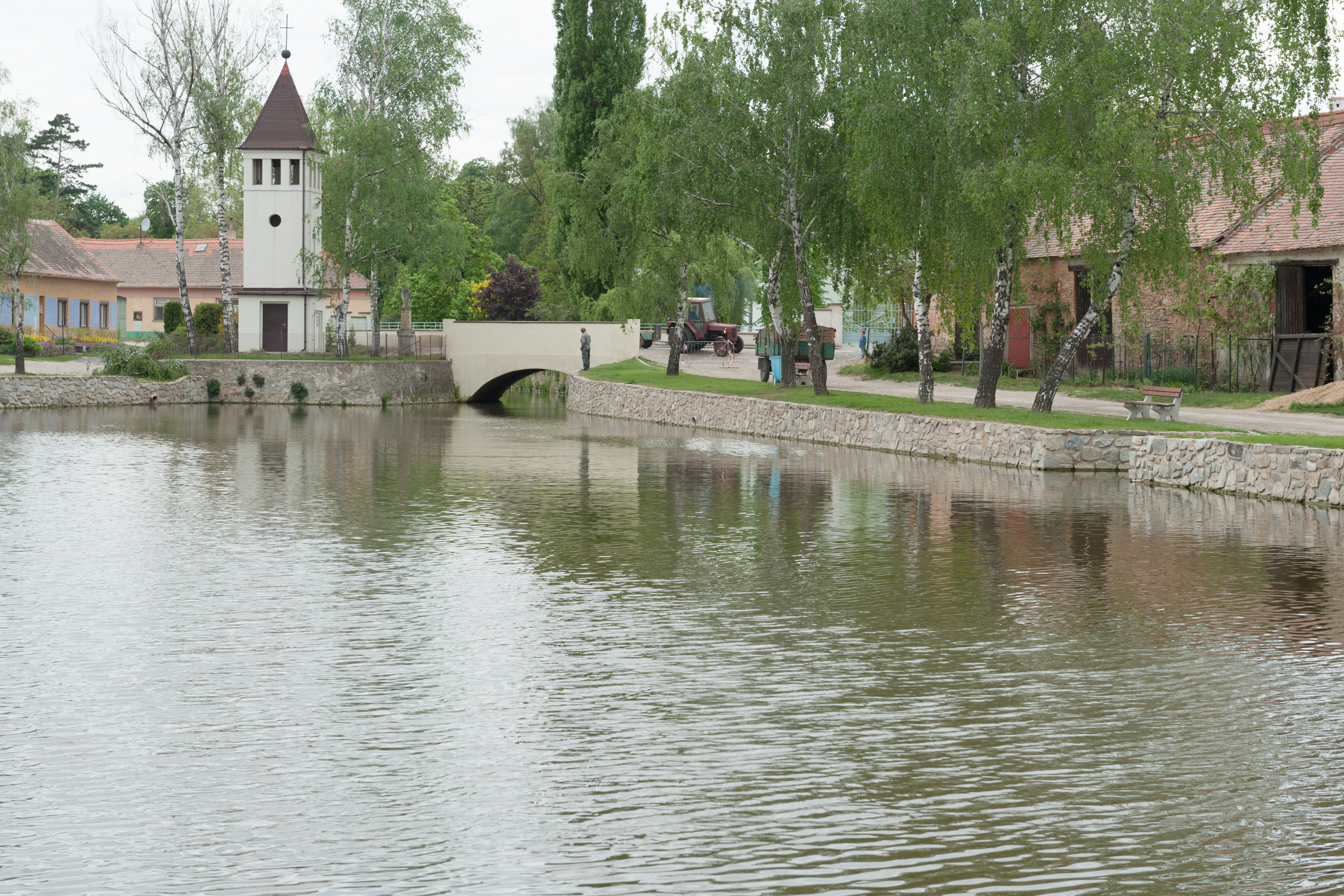
- A pond in the centre of Skalice

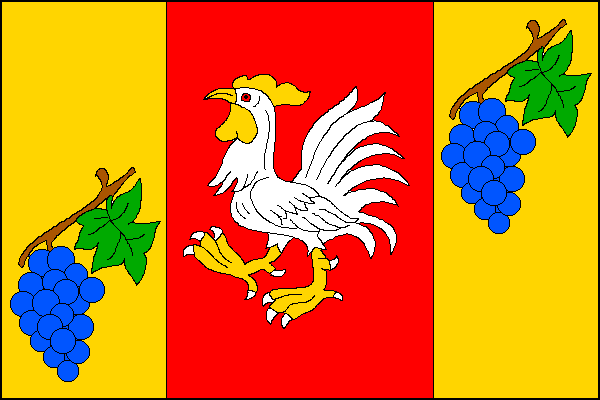
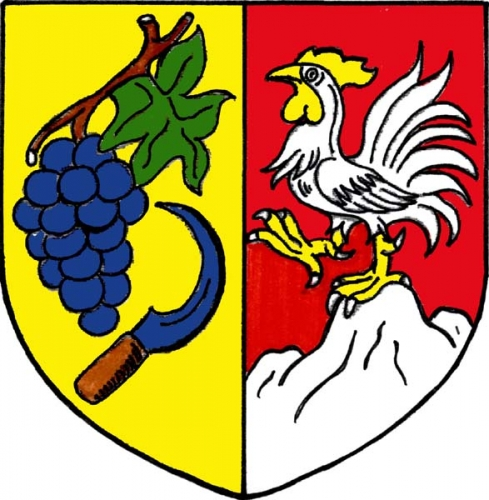
- Flag Coat of arms

- Location in the Czech Republic
- Coordinates: 48°57′52″N 16°13′29″E
- Country: Czech Republic
- Region: South Moravian
- District: Znojmo
- First mentioned: 1252

Area
  - Total: 9.53 km^{2} (3.68 sq mi)
- Elevation: 230 m (750 ft)

Population (2026-01-01)
  - Total: 518
  - Density: 54.4/km^{2} (141/sq mi)
- Time zone: UTC+1 (CET)
  - Summer (DST): UTC+2 (CEST)
- Postal code: 671 71
- Website: www.skaliceuznojma.cz

Skalice is a municipality and village in Znojmo District in the South Moravian Region of the Czech Republic. It has about 500 inhabitants.

Skalice lies approximately 20 kilometres (12 mi) north-east of Znojmo, 39 km (24 mi) south-west of Brno, and 181 km (112 mi) south-east of Prague.

== Demographics ==
Historical population
Year	Pop.	±%
1869	477	—
1880	481	+0.8%
1890	522	+8.5%
1900	531	+1.7%
1910	551	+3.8%
1921	573	+4.0%
1930	664	+15.9%
1950	539	−18.8%
1961	698	+29.5%
1970	664	−4.9%
1980	581	−12.5%
1991	545	−6.2%
2001	549	+0.7%
2011	534	−2.7%
2021	535	+0.2%
Source: Censuses
