= Rozkoš =

- Municipality
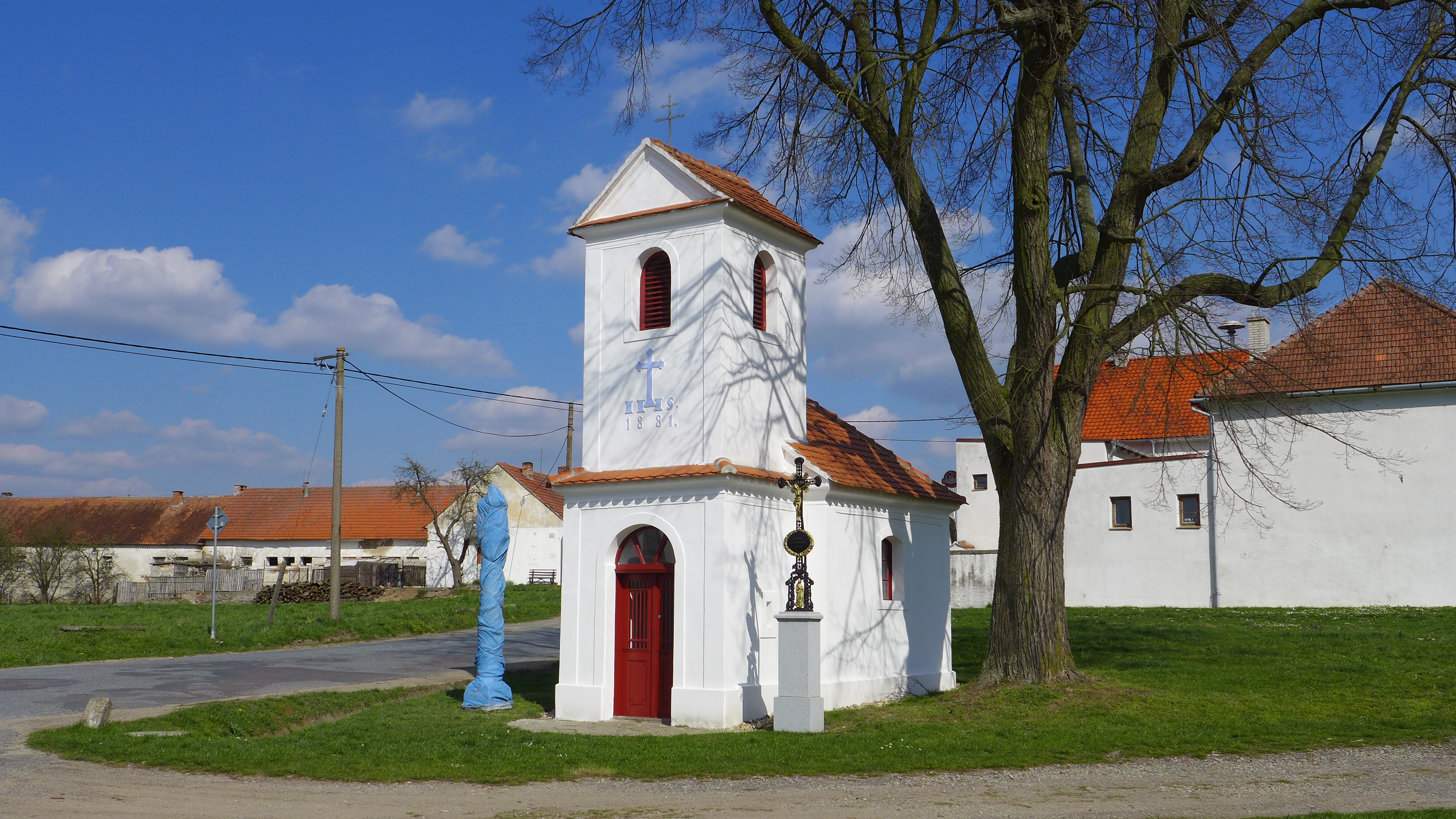
- Chapel in the centre of Rozkoš

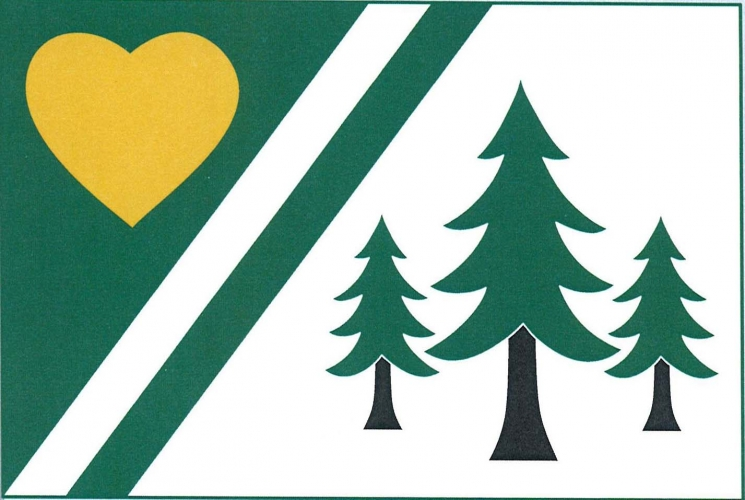
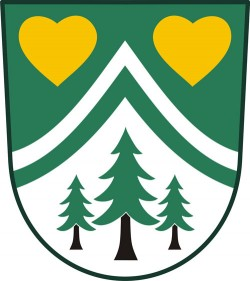
- Flag Coat of arms

- Location in the Czech Republic
- Coordinates: 49°1′43″N 15°58′40″E
- Country: Czech Republic
- Region: South Moravian
- District: Znojmo
- First mentioned: 1750

Area
  - Total: 12.35 km^{2} (4.77 sq mi)
- Elevation: 411 m (1,348 ft)

Population (2026-01-01)
  - Total: 175
  - Density: 14.2/km^{2} (36.7/sq mi)
- Time zone: UTC+1 (CET)
  - Summer (DST): UTC+2 (CEST)
- Postal code: 671 53
- Website: www.obecrozkos.cz

Rozkoš is a municipality and village in Znojmo District in the South Moravian Region of the Czech Republic. It has about 200 inhabitants.

Rozkoš lies approximately 22 kilometres (14 mi) north of Znojmo, 52 km (32 mi) west of Brno, and 162 km (101 mi) south-east of Prague.

== Demographics ==
Historical population
Year	Pop.	±%
1869	431	—
1880	447	+3.7%
1890	452	+1.1%
1900	499	+10.4%
1910	458	−8.2%
1921	482	+5.2%
1930	415	−13.9%
1950	307	−26.0%
1961	296	−3.6%
1970	305	+3.0%
1980	267	−12.5%
1991	200	−25.1%
2001	184	−8.0%
2011	194	+5.4%
2021	161	−17.0%
Source: Censuses
