= Citonice =

- Municipality
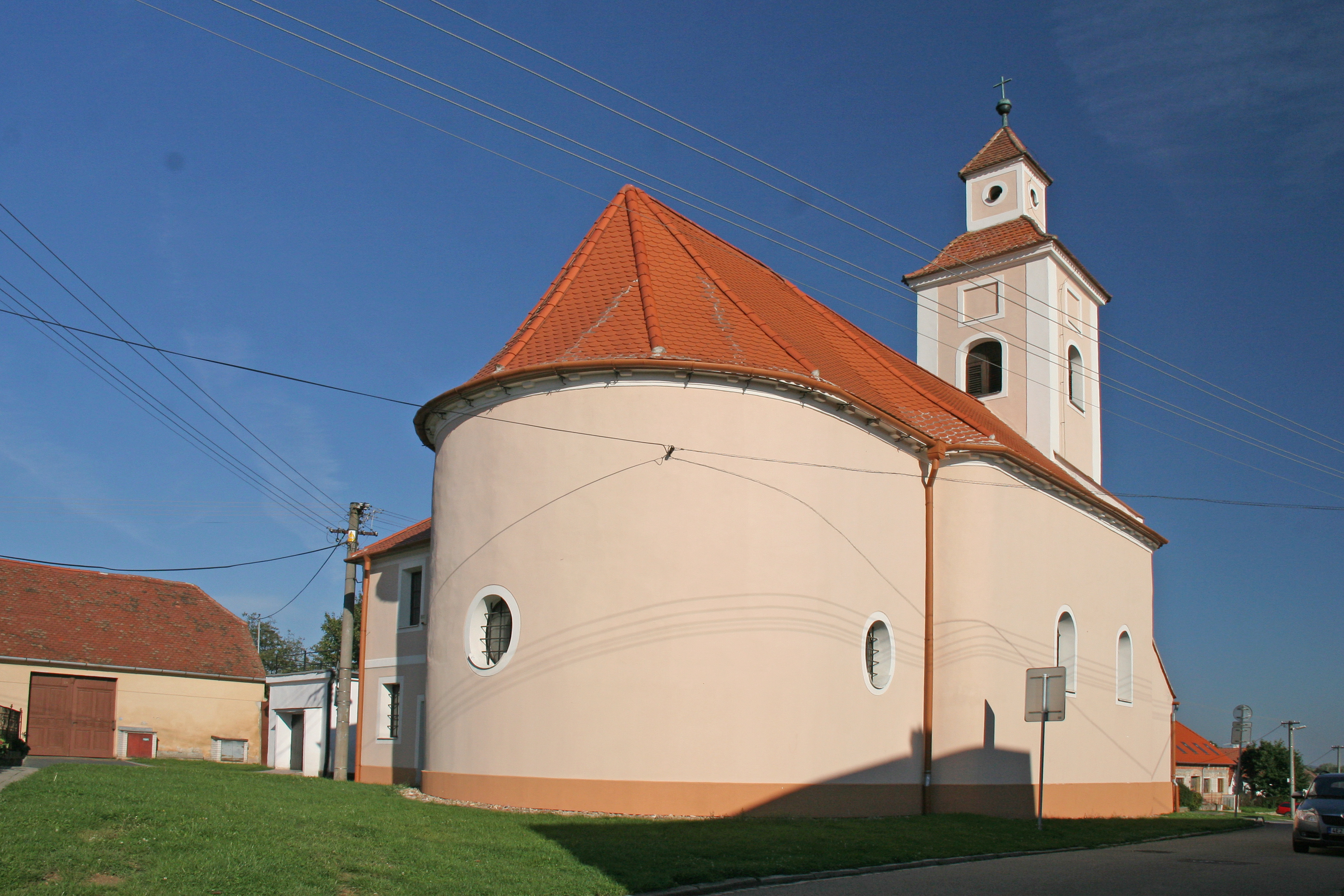
- Church of Saints John and Paul

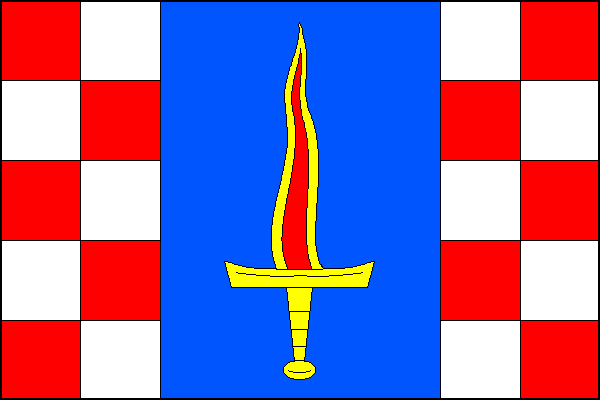
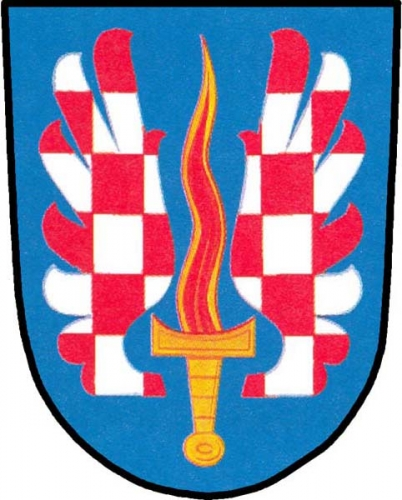
- Flag Coat of arms

- Location in the Czech Republic
- Coordinates: 48°53′2″N 15°57′52″E
- Country: Czech Republic
- Region: South Moravian
- District: Znojmo
- First mentioned: 1252

Area
  - Total: 8.95 km^{2} (3.46 sq mi)
- Elevation: 360 m (1,180 ft)

Population (2026-01-01)
  - Total: 605
  - Density: 67.6/km^{2} (175/sq mi)
- Time zone: UTC+1 (CET)
  - Summer (DST): UTC+2 (CEST)
- Postal code: 671 01
- Website: www.obeccitonice.cz

Citonice (German: Edmitz) is a municipality and village in Znojmo District in the South Moravian Region of the Czech Republic. It has about 600 inhabitants.

Citonice lies approximately 6 kilometres (4 mi) north-west of Znojmo, 59 km (37 mi) southwest of Brno, and 175 km (109 mi) southeast of Prague.

== Demographics ==
Historical population
Year	Pop.	±%
1869	556	—
1880	501	−9.9%
1890	483	−3.6%
1900	465	−3.7%
1910	499	+7.3%
1921	459	−8.0%
1930	440	−4.1%
1950	454	+3.2%
1961	513	+13.0%
1970	498	−2.9%
1980	469	−5.8%
1991	430	−8.3%
2001	446	+3.7%
2011	558	+25.1%
2021	592	+6.1%
Source: Censuses
