= Jamolice =

- Municipality
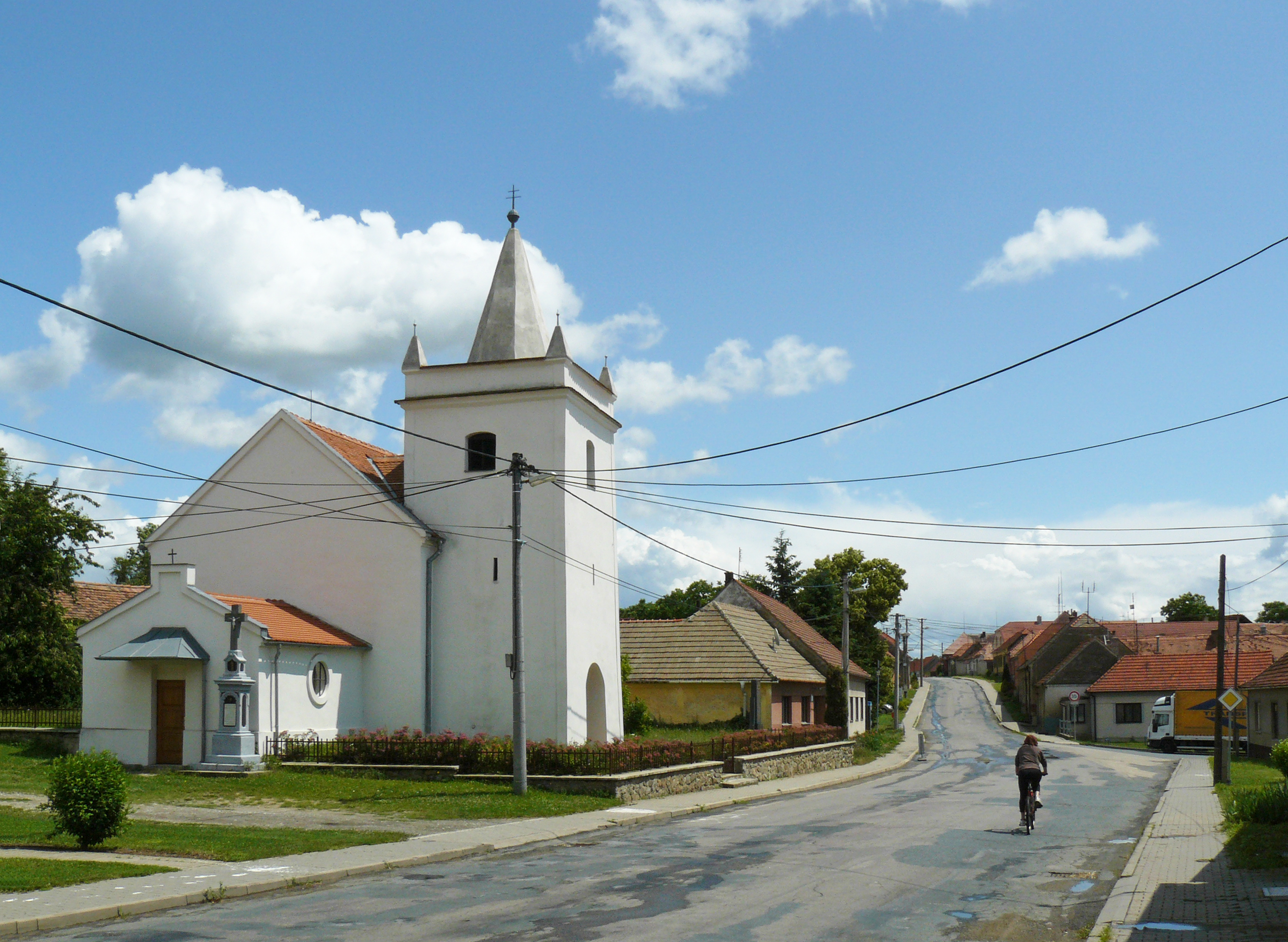
- Church of the Assumption of the Virgin Mary

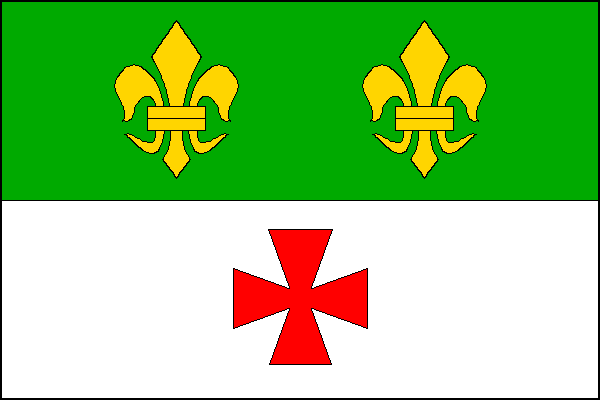
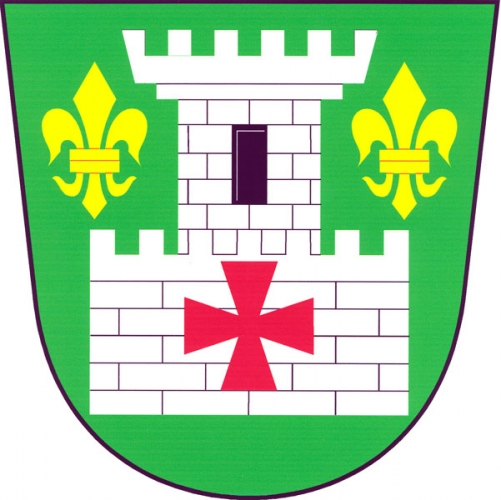
- Flag Coat of arms

- Location in the Czech Republic
- Coordinates: 49°4′2″N 16°15′13″E
- Country: Czech Republic
- Region: South Moravian
- District: Znojmo
- First mentioned: 1281

Area
  - Total: 12.94 km^{2} (5.00 sq mi)
- Elevation: 350 m (1,150 ft)

Population (2026-01-01)
  - Total: 449
  - Density: 34.7/km^{2} (89.9/sq mi)
- Time zone: UTC+1 (CET)
  - Summer (DST): UTC+2 (CEST)
- Postal code: 672 01
- Website: www.jamolice.cz

Jamolice (German: Jamolitz) is a municipality and village in Znojmo District in the South Moravian Region of the Czech Republic. It has about 400 inhabitants.

Jamolice lies approximately 30 kilometres (19 mi) north-east of Znojmo, 30 km (19 mi) south-west of Brno, and 174 km (108 mi) south-east of Prague.

== Demographics ==
Historical population
Year	Pop.	±%
1869	471	—
1880	493	+4.7%
1890	525	+6.5%
1900	570	+8.6%
1910	604	+6.0%
1921	650	+7.6%
1930	644	−0.9%
1950	576	−10.6%
1961	603	+4.7%
1970	519	−13.9%
1980	487	−6.2%
1991	438	−10.1%
2001	446	+1.8%
2011	431	−3.4%
2021	433	+0.5%
Source: Censuses
