= Hluboké Mašůvky =

- Municipality
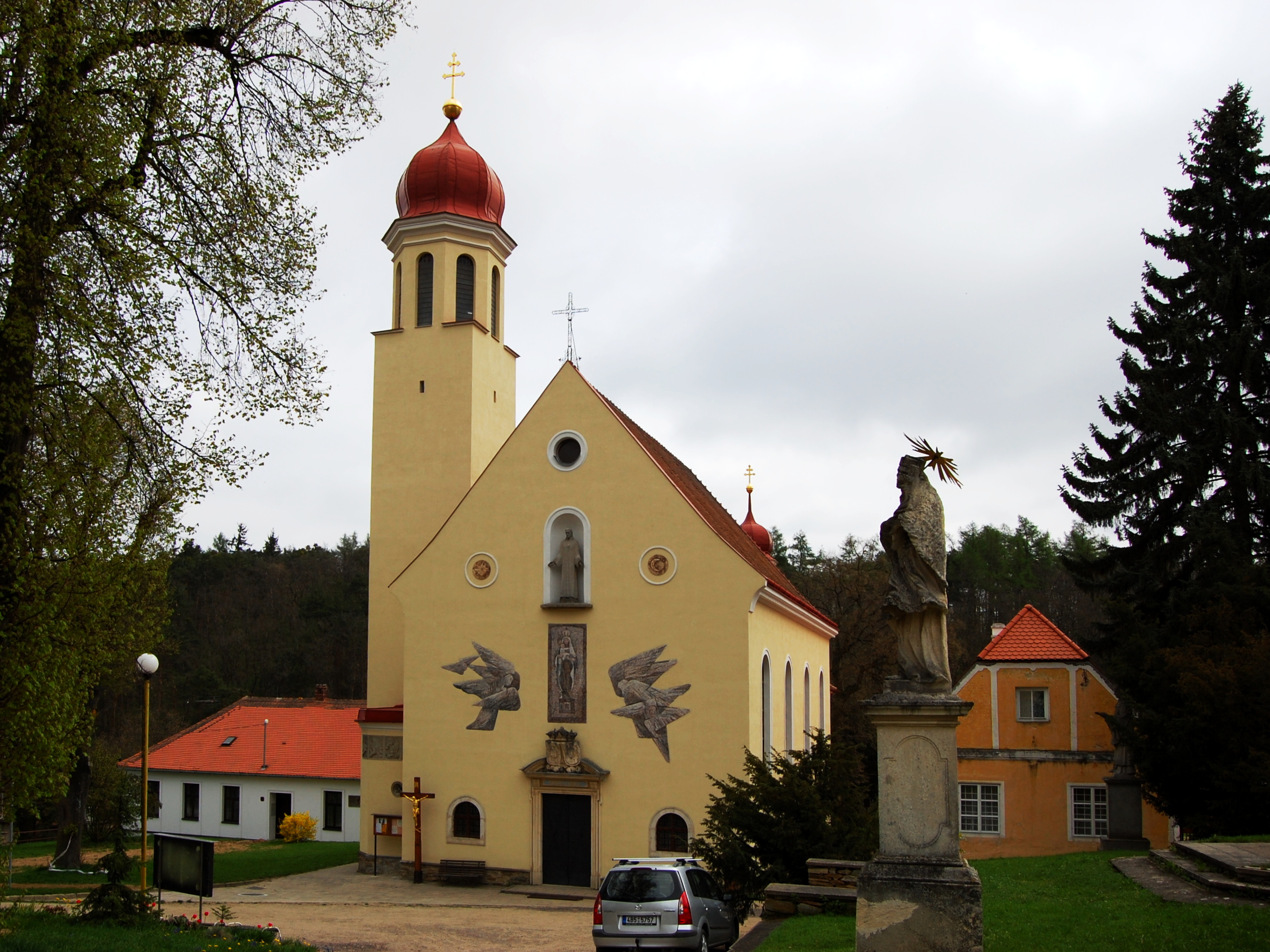
- Church of the Visitation of the Virgin Mary

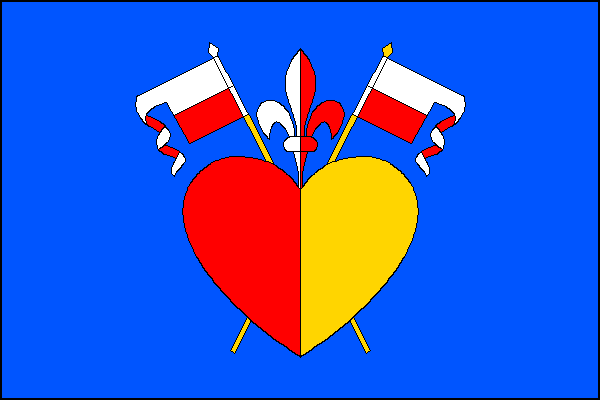
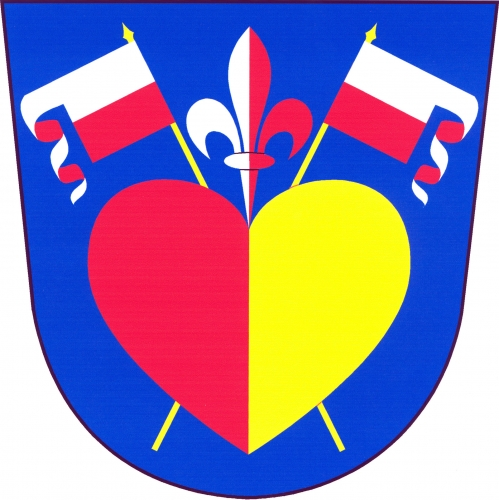
- Flag Coat of arms

- Location in the Czech Republic
- Coordinates: 48°55′25″N 16°1′32″E
- Country: Czech Republic
- Region: South Moravian
- District: Znojmo
- First mentioned: 1220

Area
  - Total: 12.84 km^{2} (4.96 sq mi)
- Elevation: 298 m (978 ft)

Population (2026-01-01)
  - Total: 847
  - Density: 66.0/km^{2} (171/sq mi)
- Time zone: UTC+1 (CET)
  - Summer (DST): UTC+2 (CEST)
- Postal code: 671 52
- Website: www.hlubokemasuvky.cz

Hluboké Mašůvky (German: Tief Maispitz) is a municipality and village in Znojmo District in the South Moravian Region of the Czech Republic. It has about 800 inhabitants.

Hluboké Mašůvky lies approximately 9 kilometres (6 mi) north of Znojmo, 53 km (33 mi) south-west of Brno, and 173 km (107 mi) south-east of Prague.

== Demographics ==
Historical population
Year	Pop.	±%
1869	518	—
1880	568	+9.7%
1890	589	+3.7%
1900	628	+6.6%
1910	692	+10.2%
1921	695	+0.4%
1930	736	+5.9%
1950	734	−0.3%
1961	778	+6.0%
1970	795	+2.2%
1980	738	−7.2%
1991	700	−5.1%
2001	703	+0.4%
2011	789	+12.2%
2021	836	+6.0%
Source: Censuses
