= Znojmo District =

Znojmo District Okres Znojmo
- District
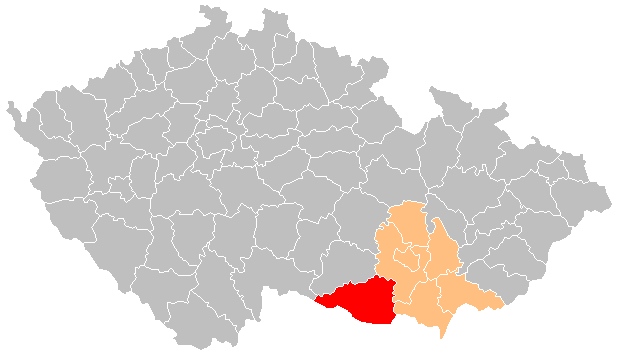
- Location in the South Moravian Region within the Czech Republic
- Coordinates: 48°55′N 16°10′E
- Country: Czech Republic
- Region: South Moravian
- Capital: Znojmo

Area
  - Total: 1,590.44 km^{2} (614.07 sq mi)

Population (2026)
  - Total: 116,051
  - Density: 72.9679/km^{2} (188.986/sq mi)
- Time zone: UTC+1 (CET)
  - Summer (DST): UTC+2 (CEST)
- Municipalities: 144
- * Towns: 5
- * Market towns: 16

Znojmo District (Czech: okres Znojmo) is a district in the South Moravian Region of the Czech Republic. Its capital is the town of Znojmo.

== Administrative division ==
Znojmo District is divided into two administrative districts of municipalities with extended competence: Znojmo and Moravský Krumlov.

=== List of municipalities ===
Towns are marked in bold and market towns in italics:

Bantice – Běhařovice – Bezkov – Bítov – Blanné – Blížkovice – Bohutice – Bojanovice – Borotice – Boskovštejn – Božice – Břežany – Čejkovice – Čermákovice – Černín – Chvalatice – Chvalovice – Citonice – Ctidružice – Damnice – Dobelice – Dobřínsko – Dobšice – Dolenice – Dolní Dubňany – Dyjákovice – Dyjákovičky – Dyje – Džbánice – Grešlové Mýto – Havraníky – Hevlín – Hluboké Mašůvky – Hnanice – Hodonice – Horní Břečkov – Horní Dubňany – Horní Dunajovice – Horní Kounice – Hostěradice – Hostim – Hrabětice – Hrádek – Hrušovany nad Jevišovkou – Jamolice – Jaroslavice – Jevišovice – Jezeřany-Maršovice – Jiřice u Miroslavi – Jiřice u Moravských Budějovic – Kadov – Korolupy – Kravsko – Křepice – Krhovice – Křídlůvky – Kubšice – Kuchařovice – Kyjovice – Lančov – Lechovice – Lesná – Lesonice – Litobratřice – Lubnice – Lukov – Mackovice – Mašovice – Medlice – Mikulovice – Milíčovice – Miroslav – Miroslavské Knínice – Morašice – Moravský Krumlov – Našiměřice – Němčičky – Nový Šaldorf-Sedlešovice – Olbramkostel – Olbramovice – Oleksovice – Onšov – Oslnovice – Pavlice – Petrovice – Plaveč – Plenkovice – Podhradí nad Dyjí – Podmolí – Podmyče – Práče – Pravice – Přeskače – Prokopov – Prosiměřice – Rešice – Rozkoš – Rudlice – Rybníky – Šafov – Šanov – Šatov – Skalice – Slatina – Slup – Stálky – Starý Petřín – Štítary – Stošíkovice na Louce – Strachotice – Střelice – Suchohrdly u Miroslavi – Suchohrdly – Šumná – Tasovice – Tavíkovice – Těšetice – Trnové Pole – Trstěnice – Tulešice – Tvořihráz – Uherčice – Újezd – Únanov – Valtrovice – Vedrovice – Velký Karlov – Vémyslice – Vevčice – Višňové – Vítonice – Vracovice – Vranov nad Dyjí – Vranovská Ves – Vratěnín – Vrbovec – Výrovice – Vysočany – Zálesí – Zblovice – Želetice – Žerotice – Žerůtky – Znojmo

== Geography ==
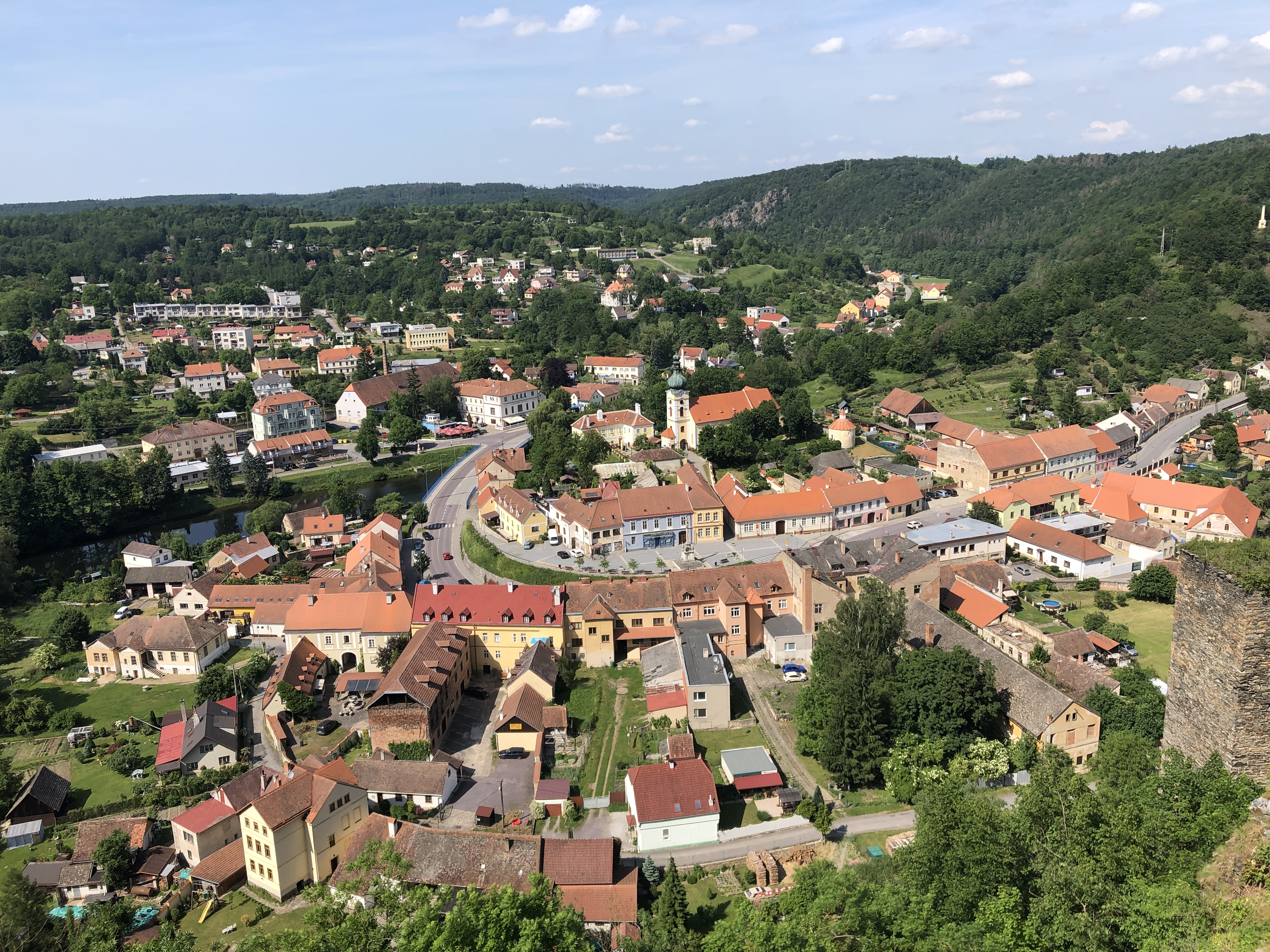
Vranov nad Dyjí and surrounding landscape

Znojmo District borders Austria to the south. The area is characterised by a slightly undulating and sparsely wooded landscape, with an above-average share of agricultural land and above-average temperatures. The territory extends into three geomorphological mesoregions: Jevišovice Uplands (most of the territory), Dyje–Svratka Valley (west) and Bobrava Highlands (small part in the northeast). The highest point of the district is a contour line in Zblovice with an elevation of 522 m (1,713 ft) and the lowest point are the river beds of the Thaya and Jevišovka in Hrušovany nad Jevišovkou at 173 m (568 ft).

From the total district area of 1,590.4 km^{2} (614.1 sq mi), agricultural land occupies 1,069.3 km^{2} (412.9 sq mi), forests occupy 353.4 km^{2} (136.4 sq mi), and water area occupies 30.3 km^{2} (11.7 sq mi). Forests cover 22.2% of the district's area.

The most important river is the Thaya, which flows across the southern part of the district. The Jevišovka flows through the central part and joins Thaya just behind the district border. The Rokytná flows through the northern part. The largest body of water is the Vranov Reservoir with an area of 762.5 ha (1,884 acres). Otherwise, there are not many bodies of water.

Along the Czech–Austrian border is the Podyjí National Park, the smallest Czech national park.

== Demographics ==
Historical population

Year	Pop.	±%
1869	107,256	—
1880	115,595	+7.8%
1890	121,277	+4.9%
1900	127,177	+4.9%
1910	132,670	+4.3%

Year	Pop.	±%
1921	135,237	+1.9%
1930	142,526	+5.4%
1950	106,450	−25.3%
1961	113,019	+6.2%
1970	109,770	−2.9%

Year	Pop.	±%
1980	113,322	+3.2%
1991	111,705	−1.4%
2001	112,277	+0.5%
2011	111,380	−0.8%
2021	112,409	+0.9%

Source: Censuses

=== Most populous municipalities ===
Name	Population	Area (km^{2})
Znojmo	33,989	66
Moravský Krumlov	5,635	50
Hrušovany nad Jevišovkou	3,354	25
Miroslav	3,019	27
Dobšice	2,225	5
Nový Šaldorf-Sedlešovice	1,871	8
Hodonice	1,764	9
Šanov	1,729	20
Hostěradice	1,671	27
Božice	1,609	30

== Economy ==
The largest employers with headquarters in Znojmo District and at least 500 employees are:

Economic entity	Location	Number of employees	Main activity
Znojmo Hospital	Znojmo	1,000–1,499	Health care
Laufen CZ	Znojmo	500–999	Manufacture of sanitary ware

The district is known for viticulture and fruit growing. Large part of the district belongs to the Znojmo wine sub-region.

== Transport ==
There are no motorways passing through the district. The most important roads are the I/38 (part of the European route E59) from Jihlava to Znojmo and the Czech-Austrian border, and the I/53 from Znojmo to Brno.

== Sights ==
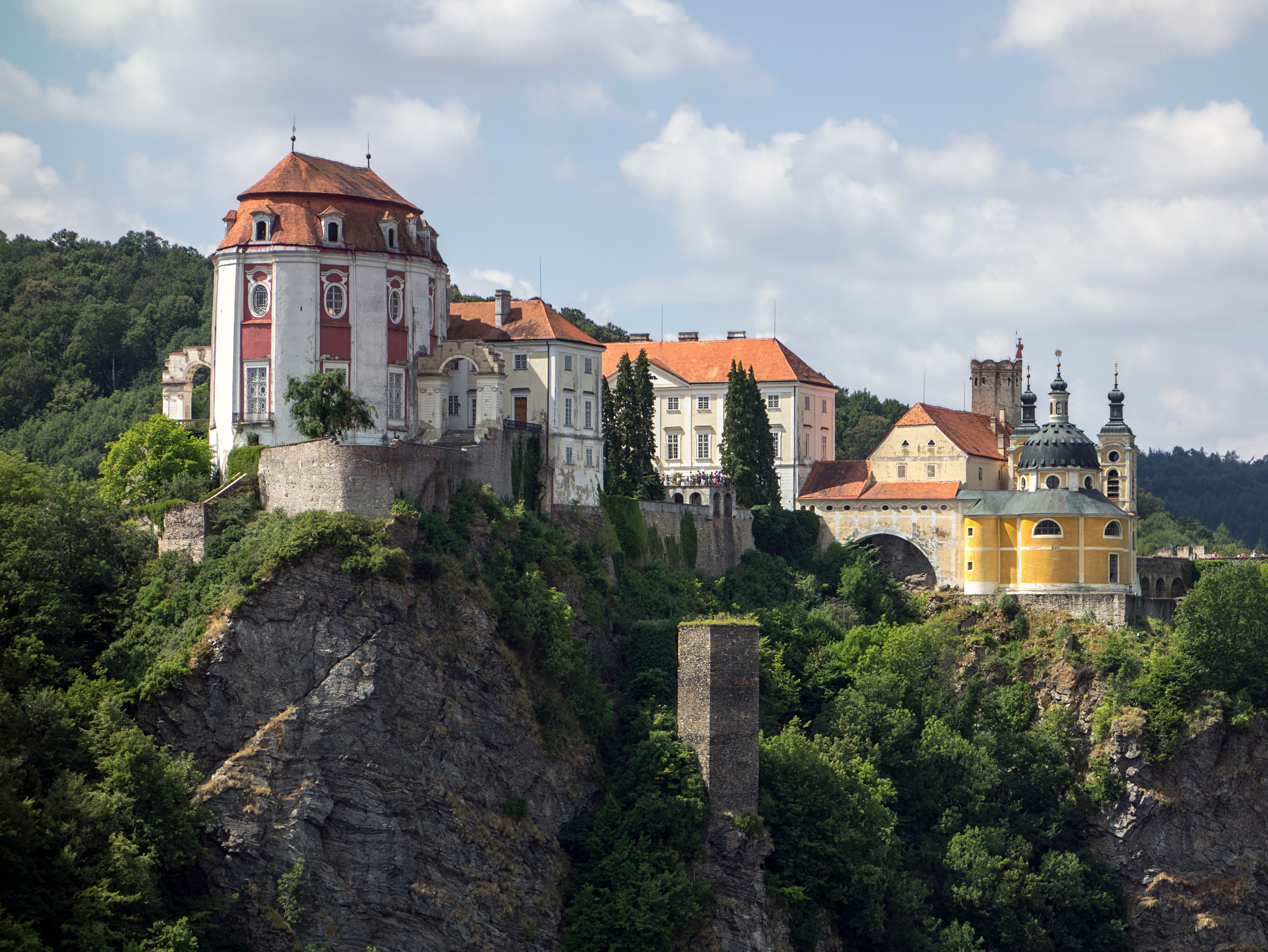
Vranov nad Dyjí Castle

The most important monuments in the district, protected as national cultural monuments, are:

- Rotunda of Saint Catherine in Znojmo
- Watermill in Slup
- Bítov Castle
- Uherčice Castle
- Vranov nad Dyjí Castle with the ruins of Nový Hrádek Castle
- Louka Monastery in Znojmo
- Moravský Krumlov Castle
- Znojmo Town Hall

The best-preserved settlements and landscapes, protected as monument reservations and monument zones, are:

- Znojmo (monument reservation)
- Jevišovice
- Moravský Krumlov
- Šatov
- Vratěnín
- Vranovsko-Bítovsko landscape

The most visited tourist destinations are the Vranov nad Dyjí Castle with the ruins of Nový Hrádek Castle, Znojmo Underground, Bítov Castle, and Moravský Krumlov Castle.
