= Trstěnice (Znojmo District) =

- Municipality
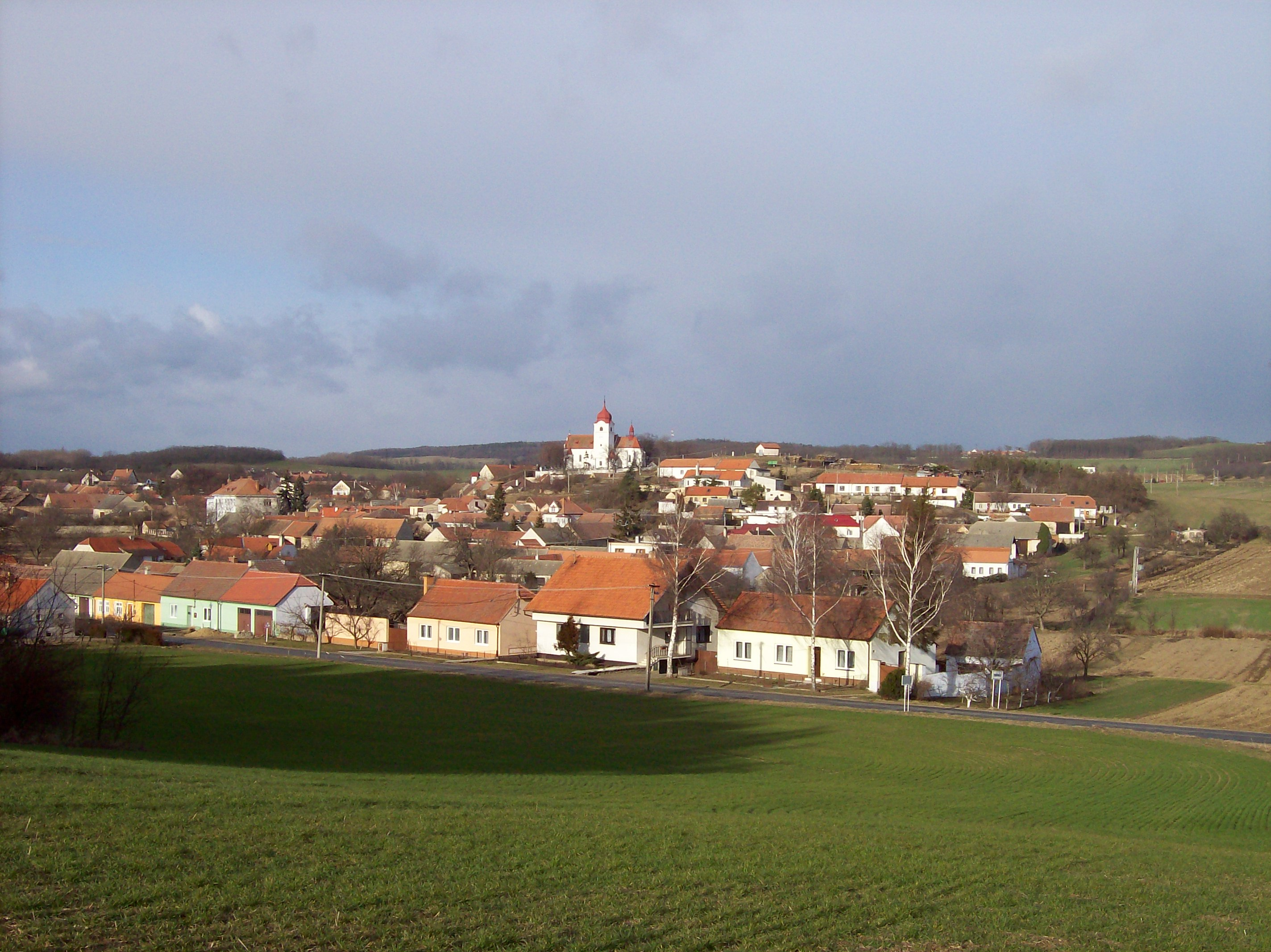
- General view

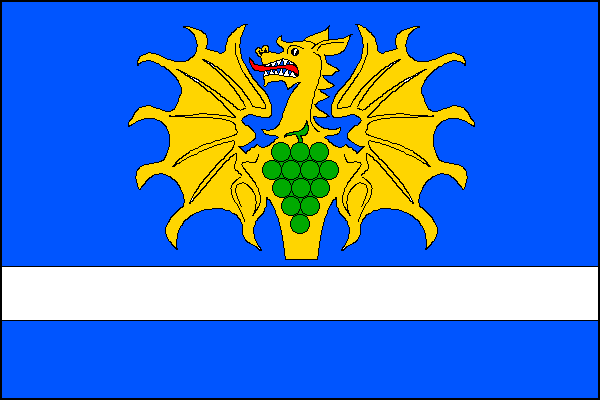
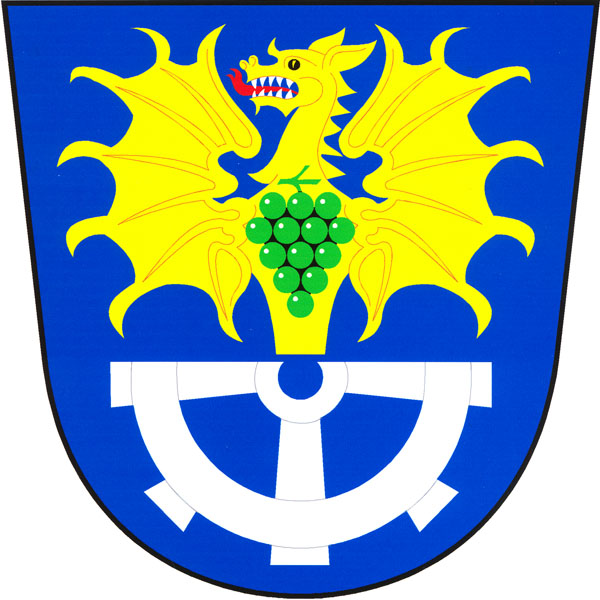
- Flag Coat of arms

- Location in the Czech Republic
- Coordinates: 48°59′12″N 16°11′44″E
- Country: Czech Republic
- Region: South Moravian
- District: Znojmo
- First mentioned: 1247

Area
  - Total: 14.36 km^{2} (5.54 sq mi)
- Elevation: 258 m (846 ft)

Population (2026-01-01)
  - Total: 514
  - Density: 35.8/km^{2} (92.7/sq mi)
- Time zone: UTC+1 (CET)
  - Summer (DST): UTC+2 (CEST)
- Postal code: 671 71
- Website: www.trsteniceumorkrumlova.cz

Trstěnice is a municipality and village in Znojmo District in the South Moravian Region of the Czech Republic. It has about 500 inhabitants.

Trstěnice lies approximately 20 kilometres (12 mi) north-east of Znojmo, 39 km (24 mi) south-west of Brno, and 178 km (111 mi) south-east of Prague.

== Demographics ==
Historical population
Year	Pop.	±%
1869	645	—
1880	690	+7.0%
1890	704	+2.0%
1900	739	+5.0%
1910	803	+8.7%
1921	872	+8.6%
1930	820	−6.0%
1950	753	−8.2%
1961	758	+0.7%
1970	682	−10.0%
1980	628	−7.9%
1991	572	−8.9%
2001	567	−0.9%
2011	542	−4.4%
2021	533	−1.7%
Source: Censuses
