= Jevišovka (river) =

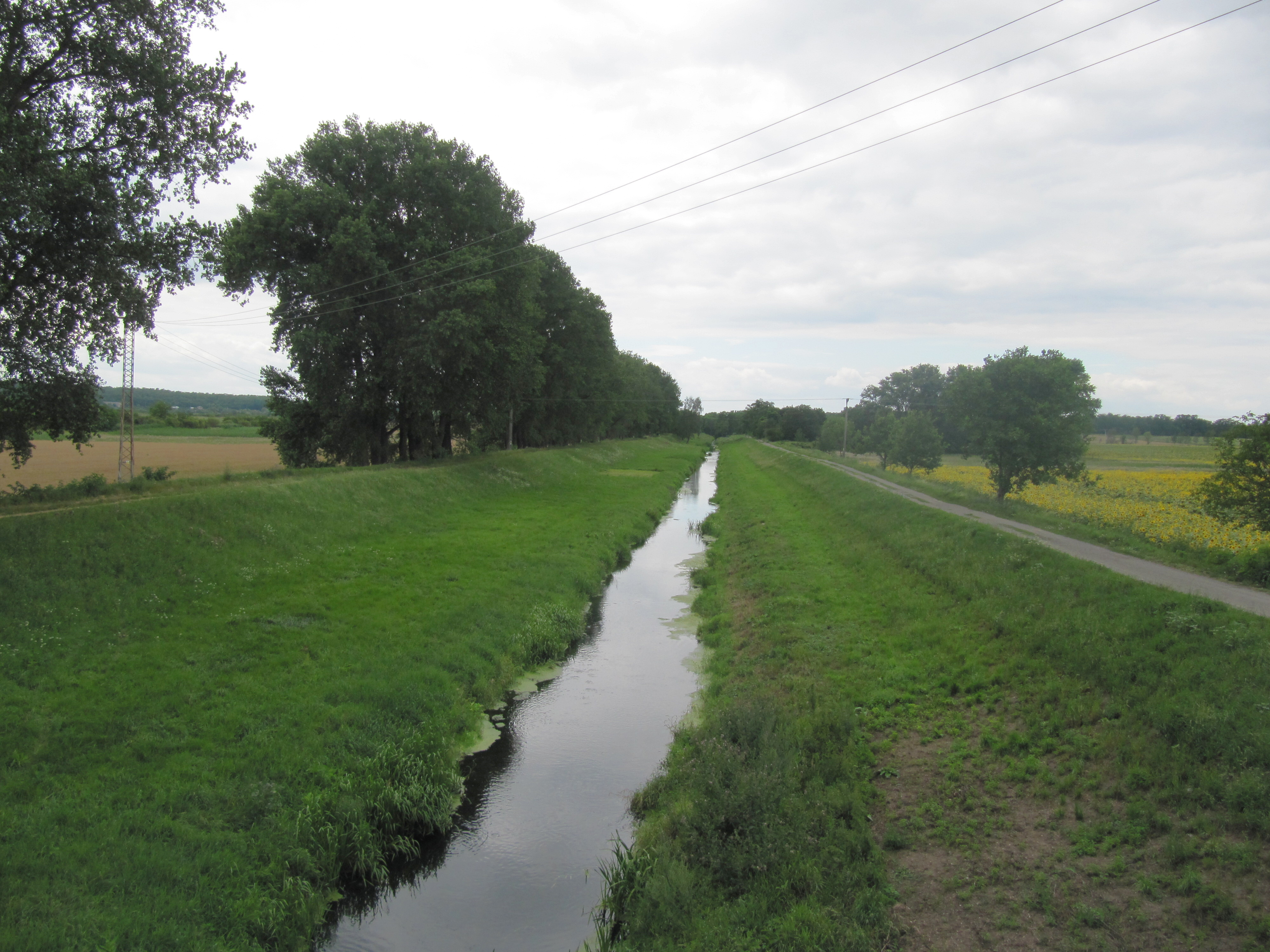
- The Jevišovka in Hrušovany nad Jevišovkou

Location
- Country: Czech Republic
- Region: South Moravian Region

Physical characteristics
- Source
  - location: Komárovice, Křižanov Highlands
  - coordinates: 49°4′12″N 15°41′4″E
  - elevation: 557 m (1,827 ft)
- Mouth
  - location: Thaya
  - coordinates: 48°49′40″N 16°28′21″E
  - elevation: 175 m (574 ft)
- Length: 81.7 km (50.8 mi)
- Basin size: 787.1 km^{2} (303.9 sq mi)
- Discharge
  - average: 1.35 m^{3}/s (48 cu ft/s) near estuary

Basin features
- Progression: Thaya→ Morava→ Danube→ Black Sea

The Jevišovka (Czech pronunciation: [ˈjɛvɪʃofka]) is a river in the Czech Republic, a left tributary of the Thaya River. It flows through the South Moravian Region. It is 81.7 km (50.8 mi) long.

== Characteristic ==
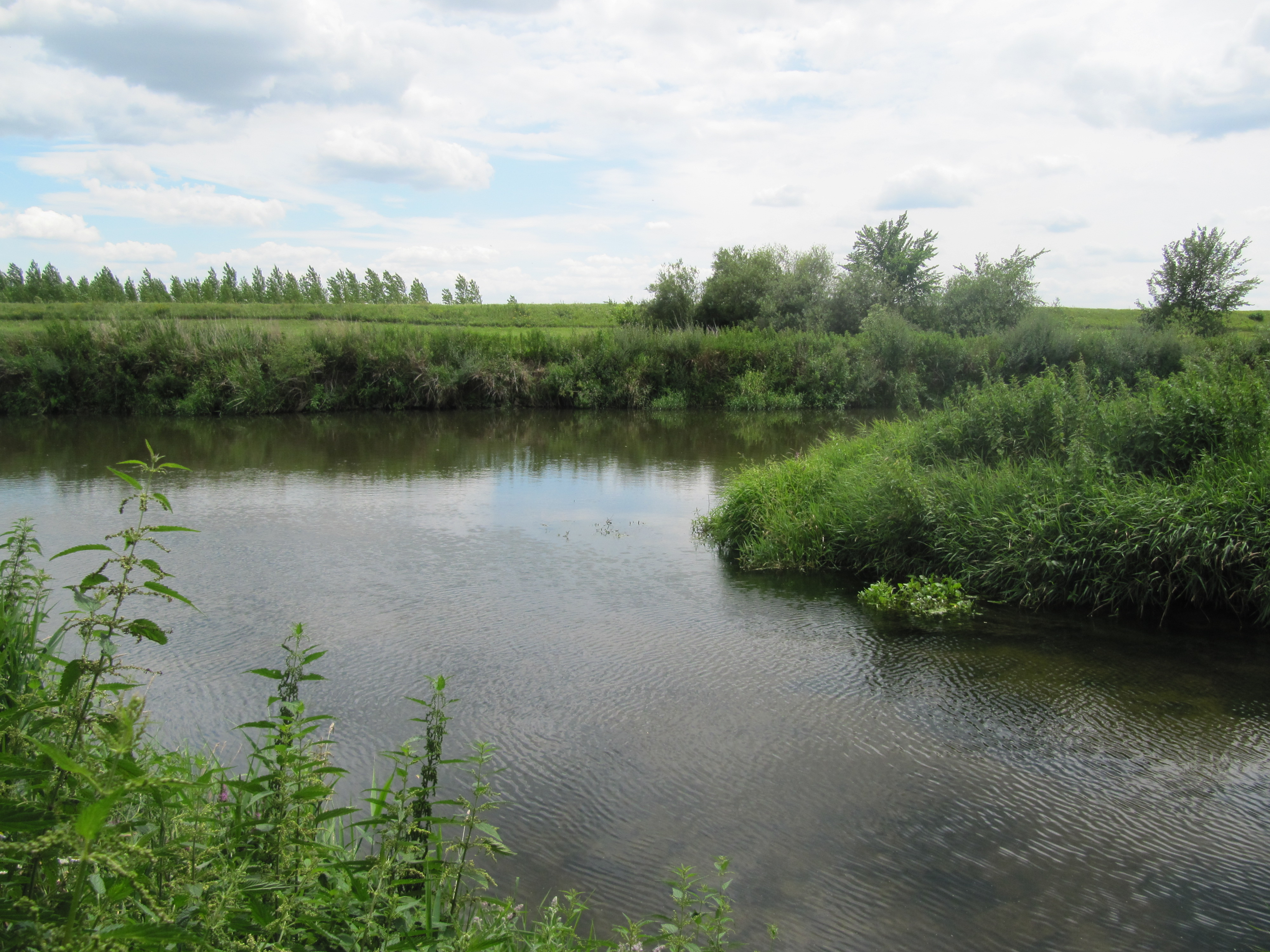
Confluence of the Jevišovka (front) and Thaya

The Jevišovka originates in the territory of Komárovice in the Křižanov Highlands at an elevation of 557 m (1,827 ft) and flows to Jevišovka, where it enters the Thaya River at an elevation of 175 m (574 ft). It is 81.7 km (50.8 mi) long. Its drainage basin has an area of 787.1 km^{2} (303.9 sq mi).

The longest tributaries of the Jevišovka are:

Tributary	Length (km)	Side
Skalička	22.8	left
Plenkovický potok	19.8	right
Křepička	18.6	left
Nedveka	17.9	left
Únanovka	14.9	right
Syrovický potok	13.7	right
Břežanka	11.5	left
Ctidružický potok	11.3	right
Slatinský potok	10.4	left
Hluboký potok	9.0	right

== Course ==
There are no large settlements on the Jevišovka. The most populous town on the river is Hrušovany nad Jevišovkou. The river flows through the municipal territories of Komárovice, Moravské Budějovice, Nové Syrovice, Častohostice, Blížkovice, Grešlové Mýto, Boskovštejn, Střelice, Jevišovice, Černín, Vevčice, Rudlice, Plaveč, Výrovice, Tvořihráz, Žerotice, Prosiměřice, Práče, Lechovice, Borotice, Božice, Šanov, Hrušovany nad Jevišovkou and Jevišovka.

== Bodies of water ==
There are 267 bodies of water in the basin area. The largest of them is the Výrovice Reservoir with an area of 52 ha (130 acres), which is constructed directly on the Jevišovka.

== See also ==
- List of rivers of the Czech Republic
