= Cernin =

Cernin may refer to:

- Černín, a municipality and village in the Czech Republic
- Czernin family (Černín family), a Czech noble family
- Saturnin, saint, also called Cernín in Spanish
