= Horní Dunajovice =

- Market town
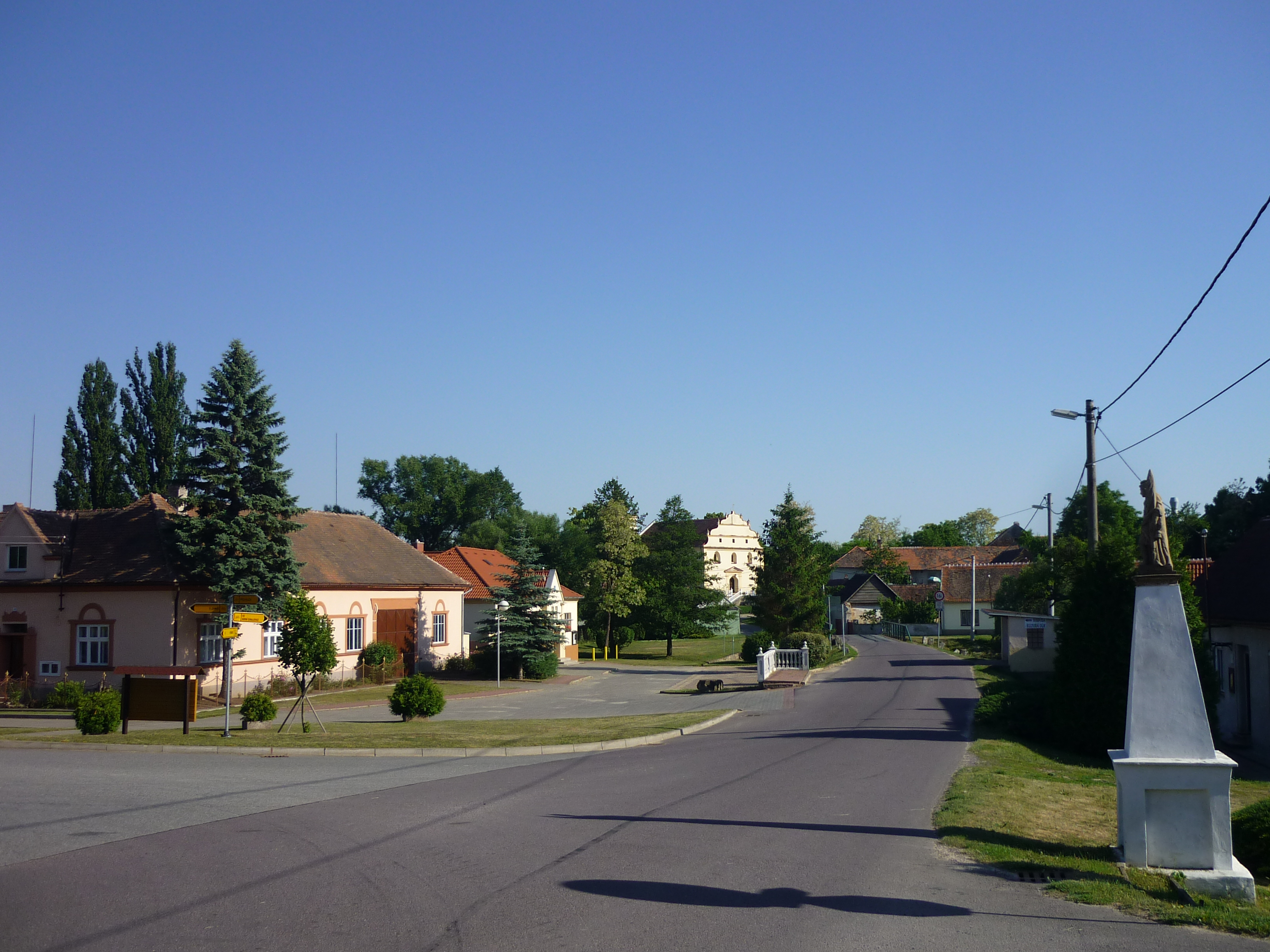
- Centre of Horní Dunajovice

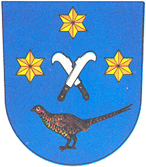
- Coat of arms

- Location in the Czech Republic
- Coordinates: 48°57′1″N 16°9′41″E
- Country: Czech Republic
- Region: South Moravian
- District: Znojmo
- First mentioned: 1350

Area
  - Total: 10.05 km^{2} (3.88 sq mi)
- Elevation: 237 m (778 ft)

Population (2026-01-01)
  - Total: 675
  - Density: 67.2/km^{2} (174/sq mi)
- Time zone: UTC+1 (CET)
  - Summer (DST): UTC+2 (CEST)
- Postal code: 671 34
- Website: www.hornidunajovice.cz

Horní Dunajovice (Czech pronunciation: [ˈɦorɲiː ˈdunajovɪtsɛ]) is a market town in Znojmo District in the South Moravian Region of the Czech Republic. It has about 700 inhabitants.

== Etymology ==
The name Dunajovice probably meant "the village of people who came from the Danube (Czech: Dunaj) area". Since the 16th century, the settlement has been called Horní Dunajovice ('upper Dunajovice') to distinguish it from the nearby village of the same name (today known as Dolní Dunajovice, 'lower Dunajovice').

== Geography ==
Horní Dunajovice is located about 13 kilometres (8 mi) northeast of Znojmo and 41 km (25 mi) southwest of Brno. It lies in the Jevišovice Uplands. The highest point is at 325 m (1,066 ft) above sea level. The Křepička Stream flows through the market town. The reservoir Dunajovická přehrada, built on the Křepička, is situated just outside the municipal border.

== History ==
The first written mention of Dunajovice is from 1350, when it was owned by a noble family that called themselves the Lords of Dunajovice. The existence of a moated fortress in the village is documented in 1386. After this year, the owners of the village often changed.

In 1505, Horní Dunajovice was acquired by the Březnický of Náchod noble family. They owned it for 150 years. Jindřich Březnický had rebuilt the fortress into a Renaissance castle in 1536. During his rule, in 1565, Horní Dunajovice was promoted to a market town by Emperor Maximilian II. In the second half of the 17th century, the owners changed often once again, until the market town was purchased by the Strahov Monastery in 1683.

In 1446 or 1447, the village of Domčice was first mentioned. Until the Thirty Years' War, it was a part of the Horní Dunajovice estate, but then it was annexed to the Žerotice estate. During the establishment of independent municipalities in 1848, Horní Dunajovice and Domčice became two separate municipalities. From 1960 to 2001, Domčice was a municipal part of Horní Dunajovice. Domčice urbanistically fused with Horní Dunajovice and since 2001, it has been administratively an integral part of Horní Dunajovice.

== Demographics ==
Historical population

Year	Pop.	±%
1869	878	—
1880	977	+11.3%
1890	998	+2.1%
1900	1,035	+3.7%
1910	1,092	+5.5%

Year	Pop.	±%
1921	1,132	+3.7%
1930	990	−12.5%
1950	820	−17.2%
1961	840	+2.4%
1970	757	−9.9%

Year	Pop.	±%
1980	667	−11.9%
1991	626	−6.1%
2001	650	+3.8%
2011	622	−4.3%
2021	605	−2.7%

Source: Censuses

== Economy ==
Horní Dunajovice is known for viticulture. It lies in the Znojemská wine subregion. Wine growing is documented as far back as 1386.

== Transport ==
There are no railways or major roads passing through the municipal territory.

== Sights ==
Church of the Holy Trinity

The main landmark of Horní Dunajovice is the Church of the Holy Trinity. The original church building was completely rebuilt and extended in the late Baroque style during the 18th century. Neoclassical modifications were made in 1818.

The Horní Dunajovice Castle was originally a Renaissance building from 1536. After 1683, the castle was rebuilt in the Baroque style. In the 19th century, it lost its function and was converted into a granary. The building has many valuable historical and architectural features.
