= Vevčice =

- Municipality
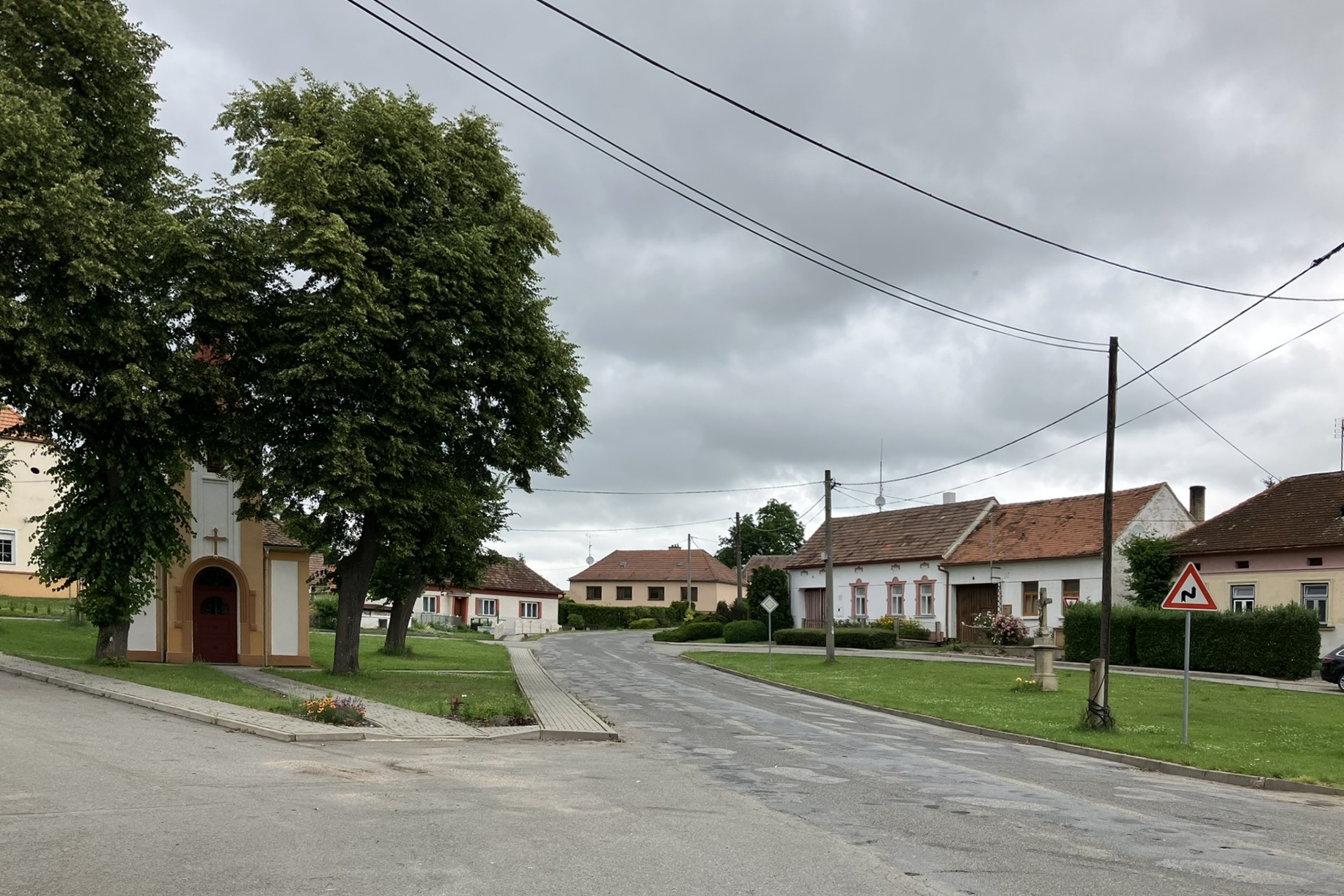
- Centre of Vevčice

- Location in the Czech Republic
- Coordinates: 48°57′44″N 16°2′40″E
- Country: Czech Republic
- Region: South Moravian
- District: Znojmo
- First mentioned: 1190

Area
  - Total: 5.92 km^{2} (2.29 sq mi)
- Elevation: 267 m (876 ft)

Population (2026-01-01)
  - Total: 63
  - Density: 11/km^{2} (28/sq mi)
- Time zone: UTC+1 (CET)
  - Summer (DST): UTC+2 (CEST)
- Postal code: 671 53
- Website: vevcice.cz

Vevčice is a municipality and village in Znojmo District in the South Moravian Region of the Czech Republic. It has about 60 inhabitants.

== Geography ==
Vevčice is located about 11 kilometres (7 mi) north of Znojmo and 47 km (29 mi) southwest of Brno. It lies in the Jevišovice Uplands. The highest point is at 346 m (1,135 ft) above sea level. The Jevišovka River flows through the municipality.

== History ==
The first written mention of Vevčice is from 1190, when the village was donated to the newly established Louka Monastery. From 1415 to 1560, Vevčice belonged to the Žerotice estate. From 1560, it was a part of the Jevišovice estate.

== Demographics ==
Historical population

Year	Pop.	±%
1869	200	—
1880	220	+10.0%
1890	242	+10.0%
1900	230	−5.0%
1910	237	+3.0%

Year	Pop.	±%
1921	236	−0.4%
1930	239	+1.3%
1950	164	−31.4%
1961	166	+1.2%
1970	141	−15.1%

Year	Pop.	±%
1980	135	−4.3%
1991	104	−23.0%
2001	79	−24.0%
2011	74	−6.3%
2021	67	−9.5%

Source: Censuses

== Transport ==
There are no railways or major roads passing through the municipality.

== Sights ==
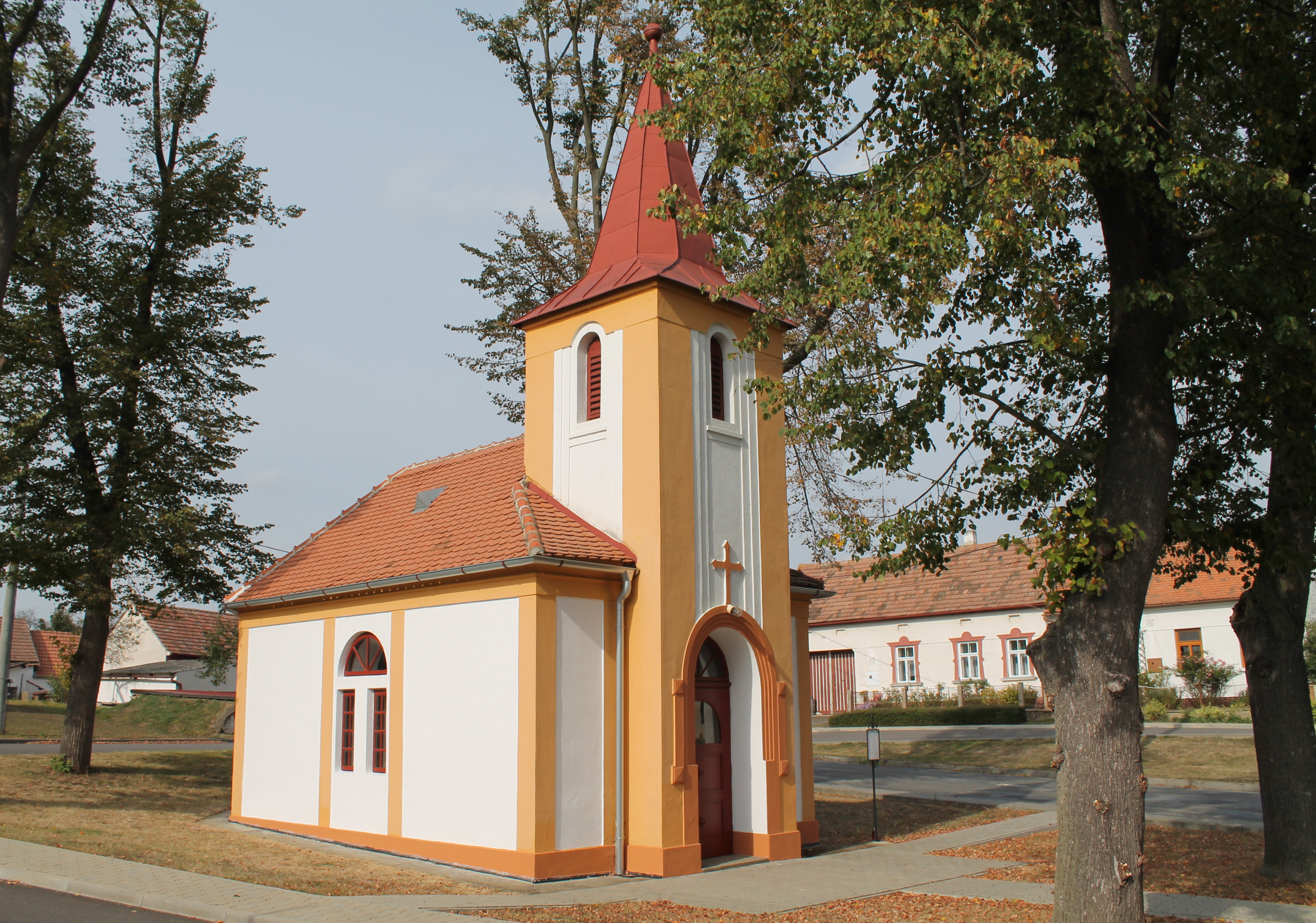
Chapel of the Assumption of the Virgin Mary

There are no protected cultural monuments in the municipality. The main landmark of Vevčice is the Chapel of the Assumption of the Virgin Mary, built at the beginning of the 20th century.
