= Hrušovany nad Jevišovkou =

- Town
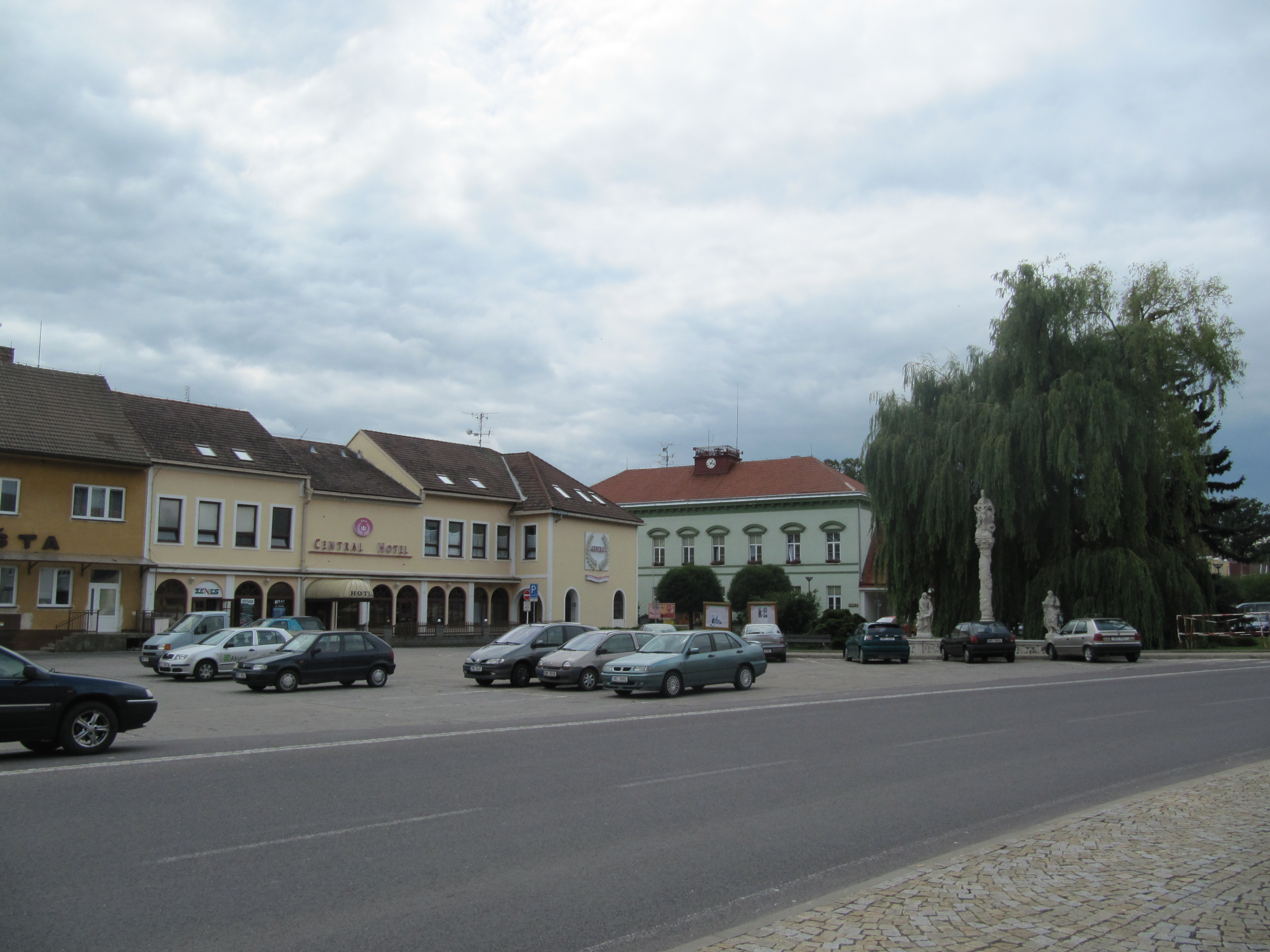
- Town square with the town hall

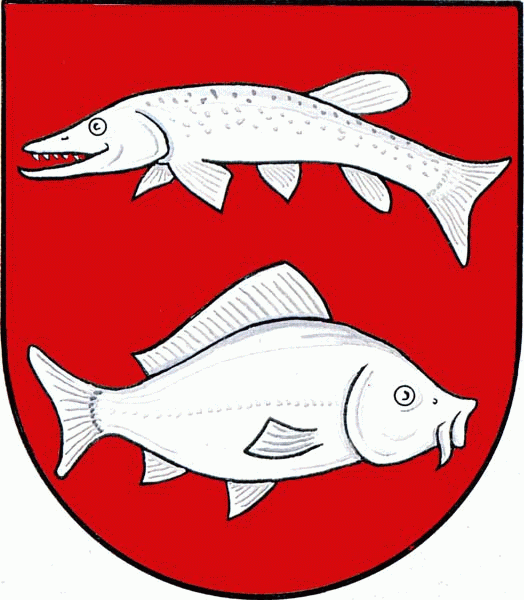
- Flag Coat of arms

- Location in the Czech Republic
- Coordinates: 48°49′47″N 16°24′10″E
- Country: Czech Republic
- Region: South Moravian
- District: Znojmo
- First mentioned: 1141

Government
  - Mayor: Eliška Volná

Area
  - Total: 25.30 km^{2} (9.77 sq mi)
- Elevation: 181 m (594 ft)

Population (2026-01-01)
  - Total: 3,354
  - Density: 132.6/km^{2} (343.4/sq mi)
- Time zone: UTC+1 (CET)
  - Summer (DST): UTC+2 (CEST)
- Postal code: 671 67
- Website: www.hrusovany.cz

Hrušovany nad Jevišovkou (Czech pronunciation: [ˈɦruʃovanɪ ˈnad jɛvɪʃofkou]; German: Grusbach) is a town in Znojmo District in the South Moravian Region of the Czech Republic. It has about 3,400 inhabitants. The town is located on the Jevišovka River in the Dyje–Svratka Valley.

Hrušovany nad Jevišovkou was founded in the first half of the 12th century at the latest and became a town in 1495. The main landmark of the town is the Church of Saint Stephen.

== Geography ==
Hrušovany nad Jevišovkou is located about 25 kilometres (16 mi) east of Znojmo and 41 km (25 mi) south of Brno. It lies in the Dyje–Svratka Valley. It is situated on the left bank of the Jevišovka River. A small southern part of the municipal border is formed by the river Thaya, which is also the state border with Austria.

== History ==
The first written mention of Hrušovany nad Jevišovkou is in a deed of bishop Jindřich Zdík from 1141. The settlement was promoted to a town in 1495 by King Vladislaus II. During the rule of Counts of Khuen-Belassi in the 19th century, economic development occurred. The railway from Brno to Vienna, a school and a hospital were built and a sugar factory was founded.

== Demographics ==
Historical population

Year	Pop.	±%
1869	2,024	—
1880	2,274	+12.4%
1890	2,162	−4.9%
1900	2,362	+9.3%
1910	2,569	+8.8%

Year	Pop.	±%
1921	2,643	+2.9%
1930	2,945	+11.4%
1950	2,076	−29.5%
1961	2,470	+19.0%
1970	2,487	+0.7%

Year	Pop.	±%
1980	3,090	+24.2%
1991	3,276	+6.0%
2001	3,274	−0.1%
2011	3,162	−3.4%
2021	3,186	+0.8%

Source: Censuses

== Economy ==
Hrušovany nad Jevišovkou was known for the sugar factory, founded in 1848. From 1992, it was owned by the Agrana conglomerate. In 2025, it was decided to end production for economic reasons.

== Transport ==
The train station called Hrušovany nad Jevišovkou-Šanov, which serves the town, is located on the railway line Znojmo–Břeclav and is situated in neighbouring Šanov.

== Sights ==
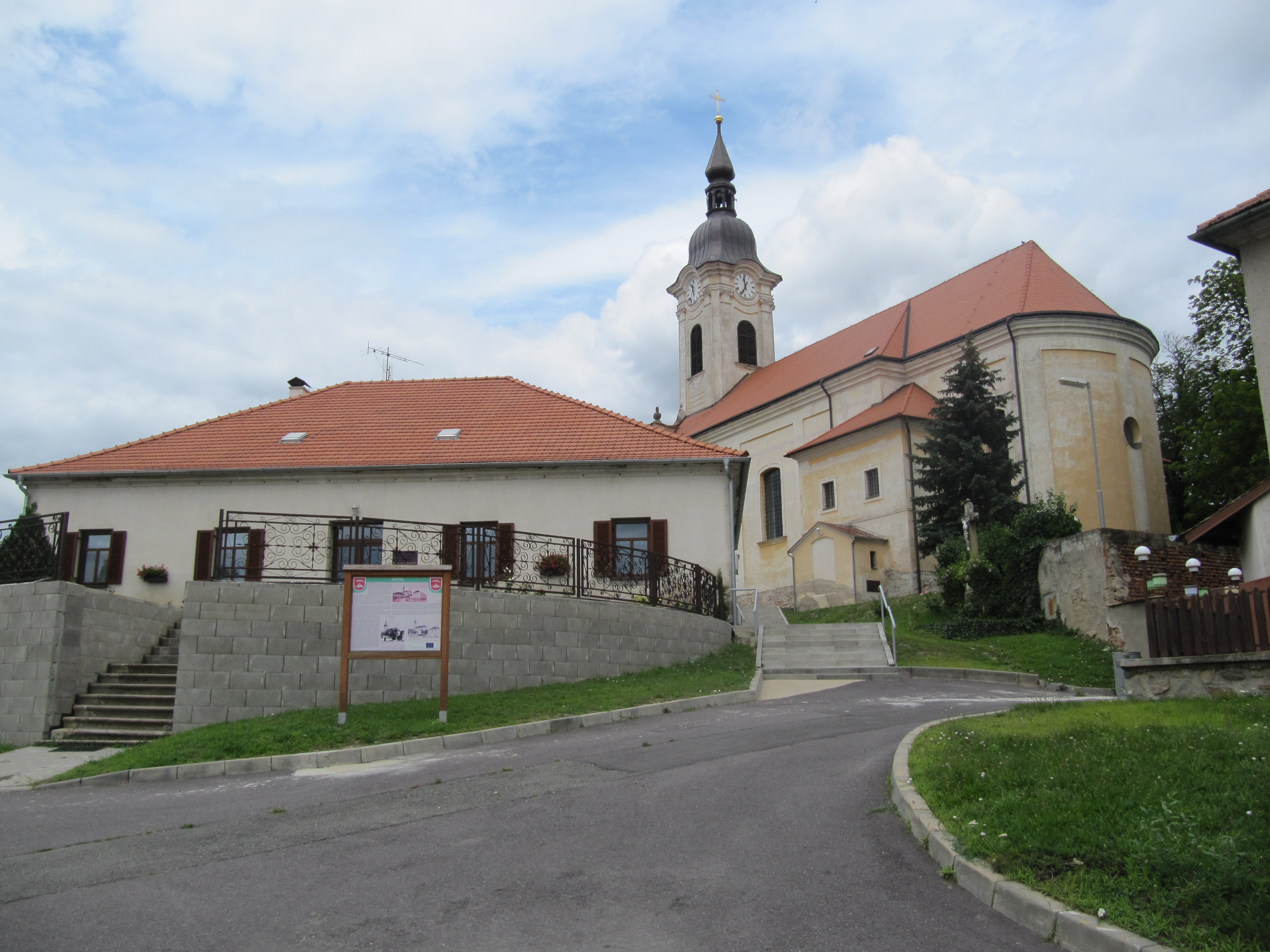
Church of Saint Stephen and rectory

The main landmark of the town is the Church of Saint Stephen. It was built in the late Baroque style in 1757 by plans of the architect Joseph Emanuel Fischer von Erlach. It replaced an old church first mentioned in 1339.

The Hrušovany nad Jevišovkou Castle was built in the early Baroque style in 1669. Its present appearance is the result of the Neoclassical reconstruction in 1804. Today it is privately owned and inaccessible.

== Notable people ==
- Sára Bejlek (born 2006), tennis player
