= Borotice =

Borotice may refer to places in the Czech Republic:

- Borotice (Příbram District), a municipality and village in the Central Bohemian Region
- Borotice (Znojmo District), a municipality and village in the South Moravian Region
