= Plaveč =

Plaveč may refer to places:

- Plaveč, Stará Ľubovňa District, a municipality and village in the Prešov Region, Slovakia
- Plaveč (Znojmo District), a municipality and village in the South Moravian Region, Czech Republic
