= Vincenc Lesný =

Professor

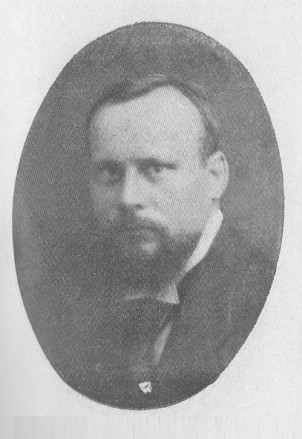
- Born: 3 April 1882; Komárovice, Moravia Austria-Hungary
- Died: 9 April 1953 (aged 71); Prague, Czechoslovakia
- Occupations: Teacher, research scholar
- Spouse: Milada Krausová-Lesná
- Children: Ivan Lesný

Vincenc Lesný (3 April 1882 – 9 April 1953) was a Czech professor and research scholar of Indology and Iranian Studies.

== Early life ==
The second son of Baltazar Lesný and Victorie (née Sujerlová), Vincenc was born at Komárovice, Moravia Austria-Hungary (now in the Czech Republic) on 3 April 1882. After graduation, he joined a naval academy at Pula between 1901 and 1903. He studied classical philology, Sanskrit and old Indian culture at Charles University between 1903 and 1907. He attended lectures on modern Indian languages in Oxford and Bonn in 1909-1910. On completing his studies, he first taught in schools and then in the university.

== Santiniketan ==
He was a student of Moriz Winternitz. In 1920, Rabindranath Tagore met him during his visit to Czechoslovakia. Lesný was an admirer of Tagore's poetry and had translated in 1914, some of his prose and poetry into Czech and published it - Rabindranath Thakur : Ukázky poesie a prosy. When Winternitz joined Visva Bharati University in 1923 as a visiting professor, Lesný also went to Santiniketan. He taught German and himself learnt Bengali. He had mastered Sanskrit before going to Santiniketan. Lesný went back after a short time but again returned to Santiniketan in 1928 as a professor.

== Later life ==
At the Charles University in Prague, he became associate professor of Indology in 1924, full professor in 1930 and took over management of the Faculty of Arts in 1937. Since 1945, he was director of the Oriental Institute at Prague.

His wife, Milada Krausová-Lesná, was a Czech translator from Scandinavian languages. Their son, Ivan Lensy, was a doctor and a writer.

== Works ==
His book Buddhism: Buddha and Buddhism of the Pali Canon (1921) was an objective view of Buddhism. His Spirit of India presented history and religion in India in a historical context. He translated extensively. His later translations of Tagore were the first directly from Bengali to Czech.
