= Boskovštejn =

- Municipality
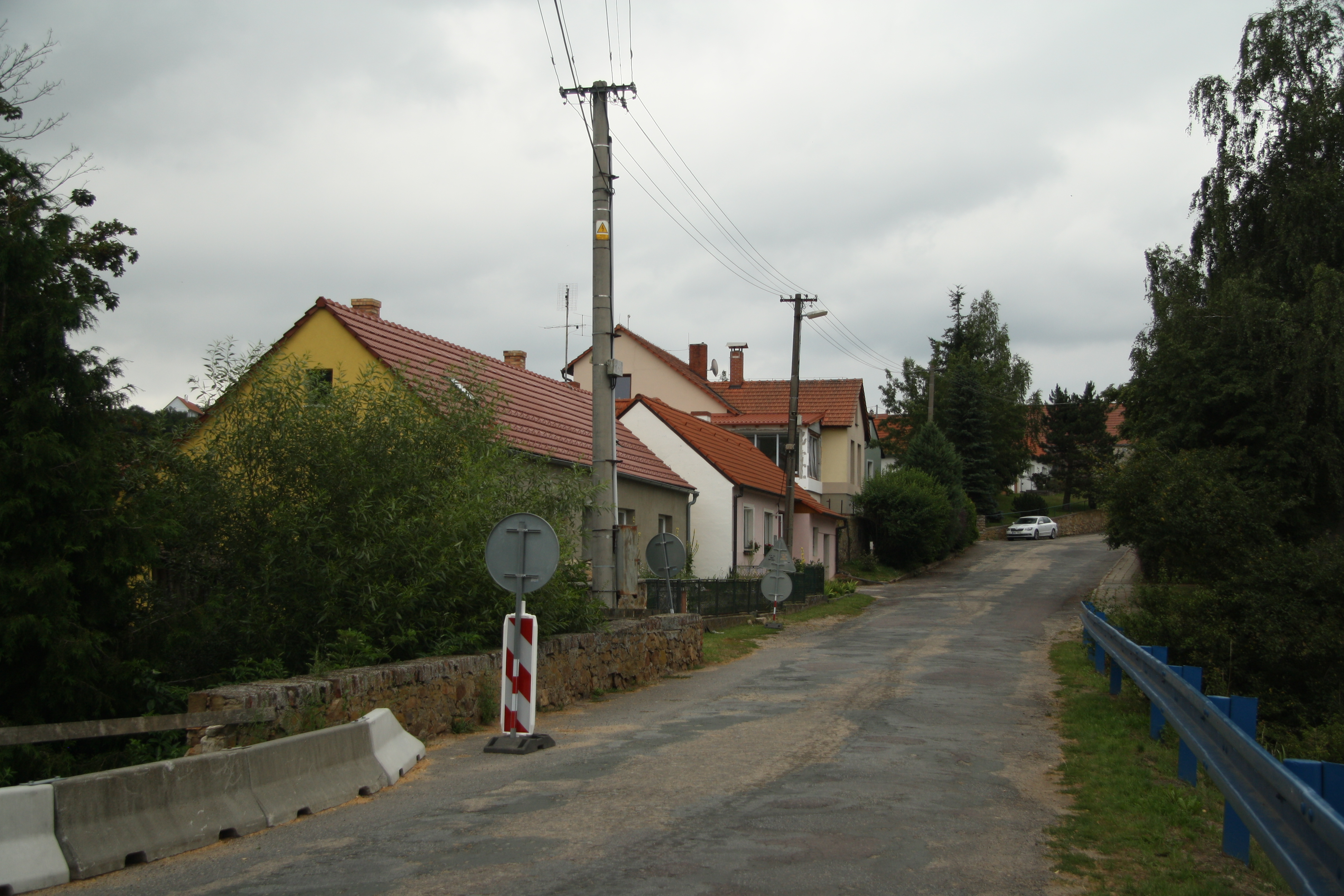
- Centre of Boskovštejn

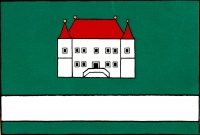
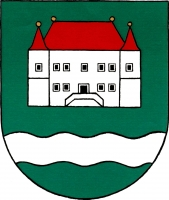
- Flag Coat of arms

- Location in the Czech Republic
- Coordinates: 48°58′58″N 15°55′46″E
- Country: Czech Republic
- Region: South Moravian
- District: Znojmo
- First mentioned: 1586

Area
  - Total: 7.59 km^{2} (2.93 sq mi)
- Elevation: 360 m (1,180 ft)

Population (2026-01-01)
  - Total: 184
  - Density: 24.2/km^{2} (62.8/sq mi)
- Time zone: UTC+1 (CET)
  - Summer (DST): UTC+2 (CEST)
- Postal code: 671 54
- Website: www.boskovstejn.cz

Boskovštejn (German: Boskowstein) is a municipality and village in Znojmo District in the South Moravian Region of the Czech Republic. It has about 200 inhabitants.

Boskovštejn lies on the Jevišovka River, approximately 16 kilometres (10 mi) north-west of Znojmo, 55 km (34 mi) south-west of Brno, and 166 km (103 mi) south-east of Prague.

== Demographics ==
Historical population
Year	Pop.	±%
1869	403	—
1880	377	−6.5%
1890	420	+11.4%
1900	478	+13.8%
1910	449	−6.1%
1921	440	−2.0%
1930	408	−7.3%
1950	317	−22.3%
1961	363	+14.5%
1970	285	−21.5%
1980	237	−16.8%
1991	156	−34.2%
2001	146	−6.4%
2011	144	−1.4%
2021	161	+11.8%
Source: Censuses

== Sights ==
The main landmark is the Boskovštejn Castle. It was built as a water fortress in the early 16th century. Around 1600, it was rebuilt into a castle. At present the building serves as a bicycle museum.
