= Grešlové Mýto =

- Municipality
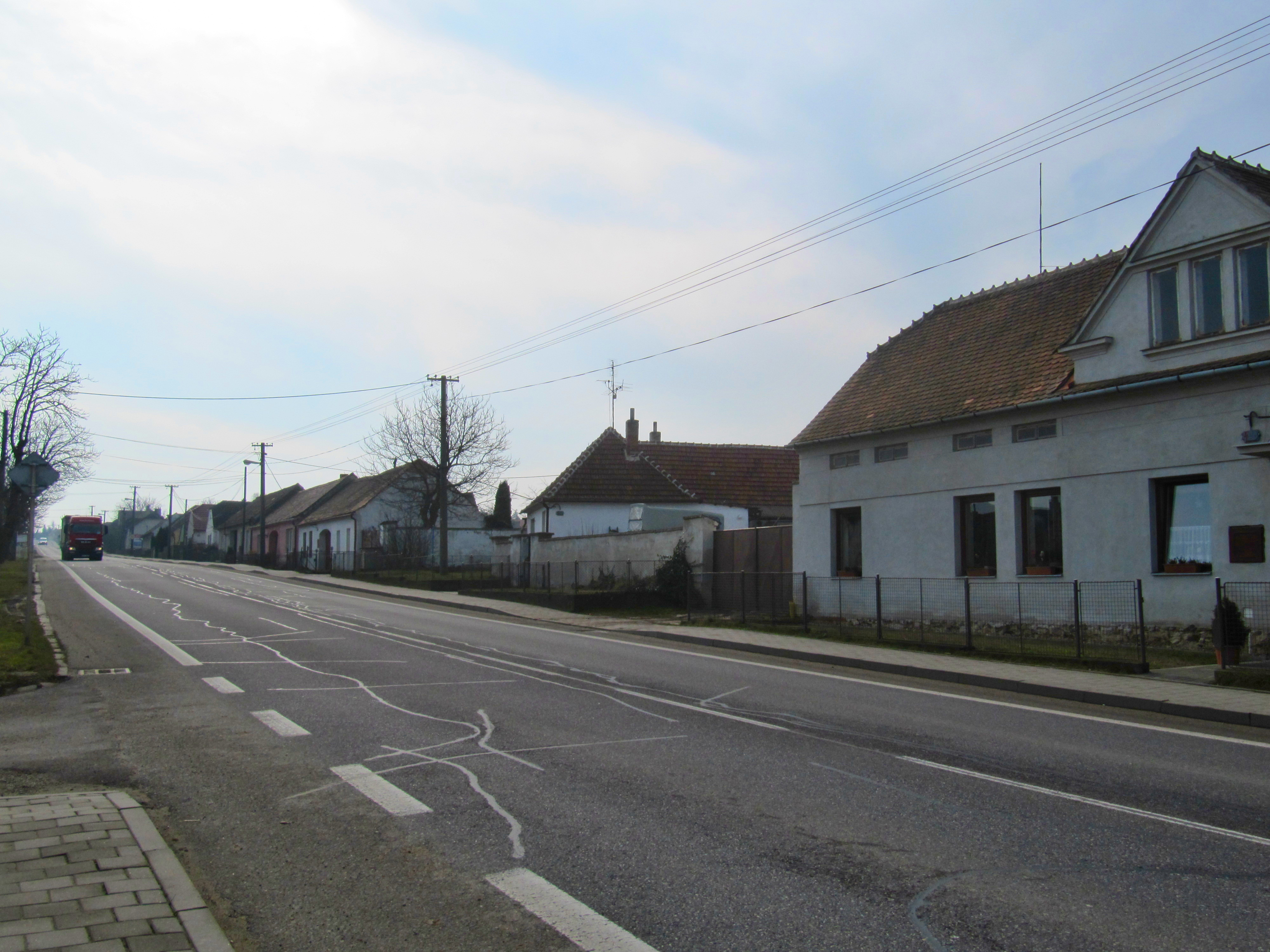
- Main street

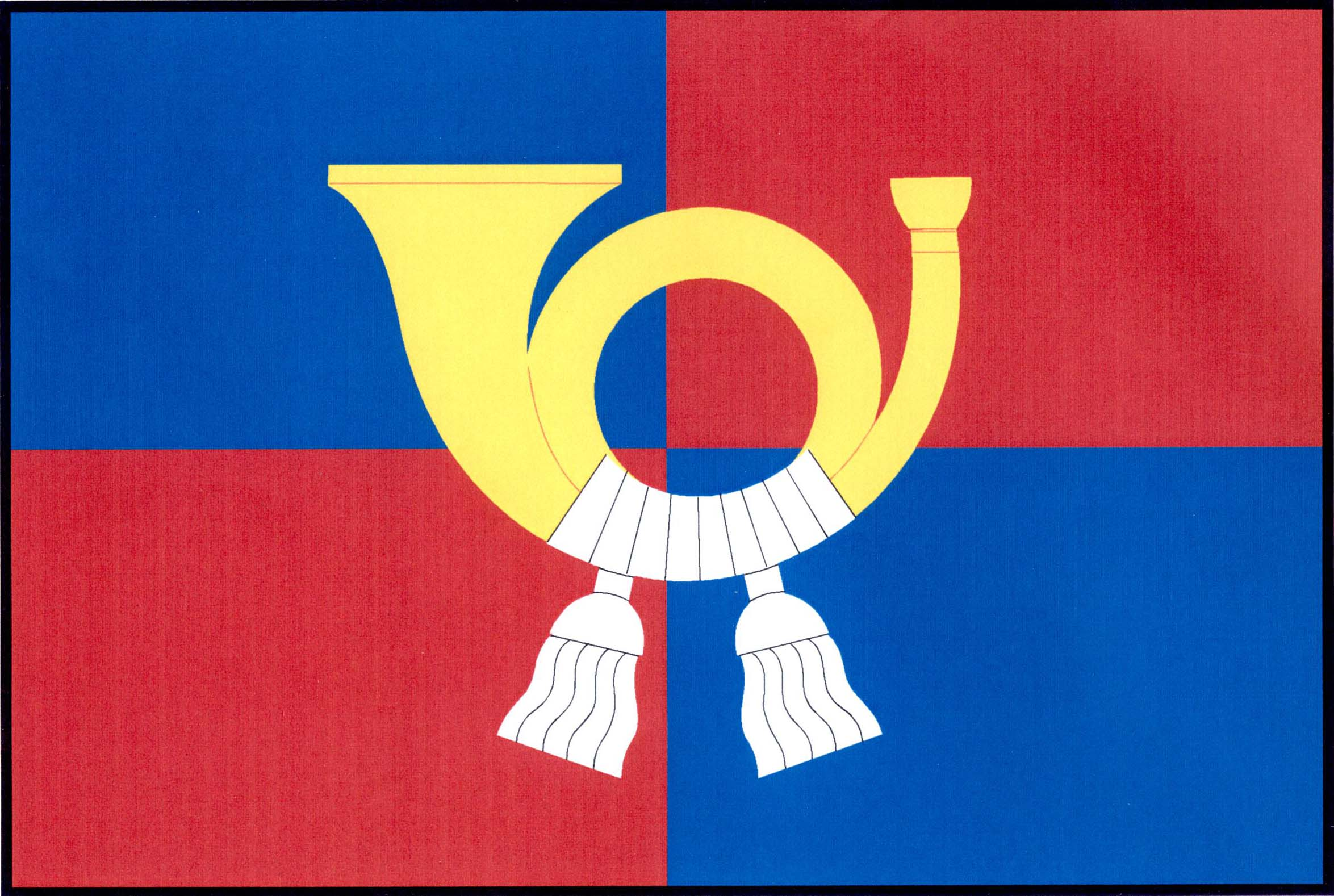
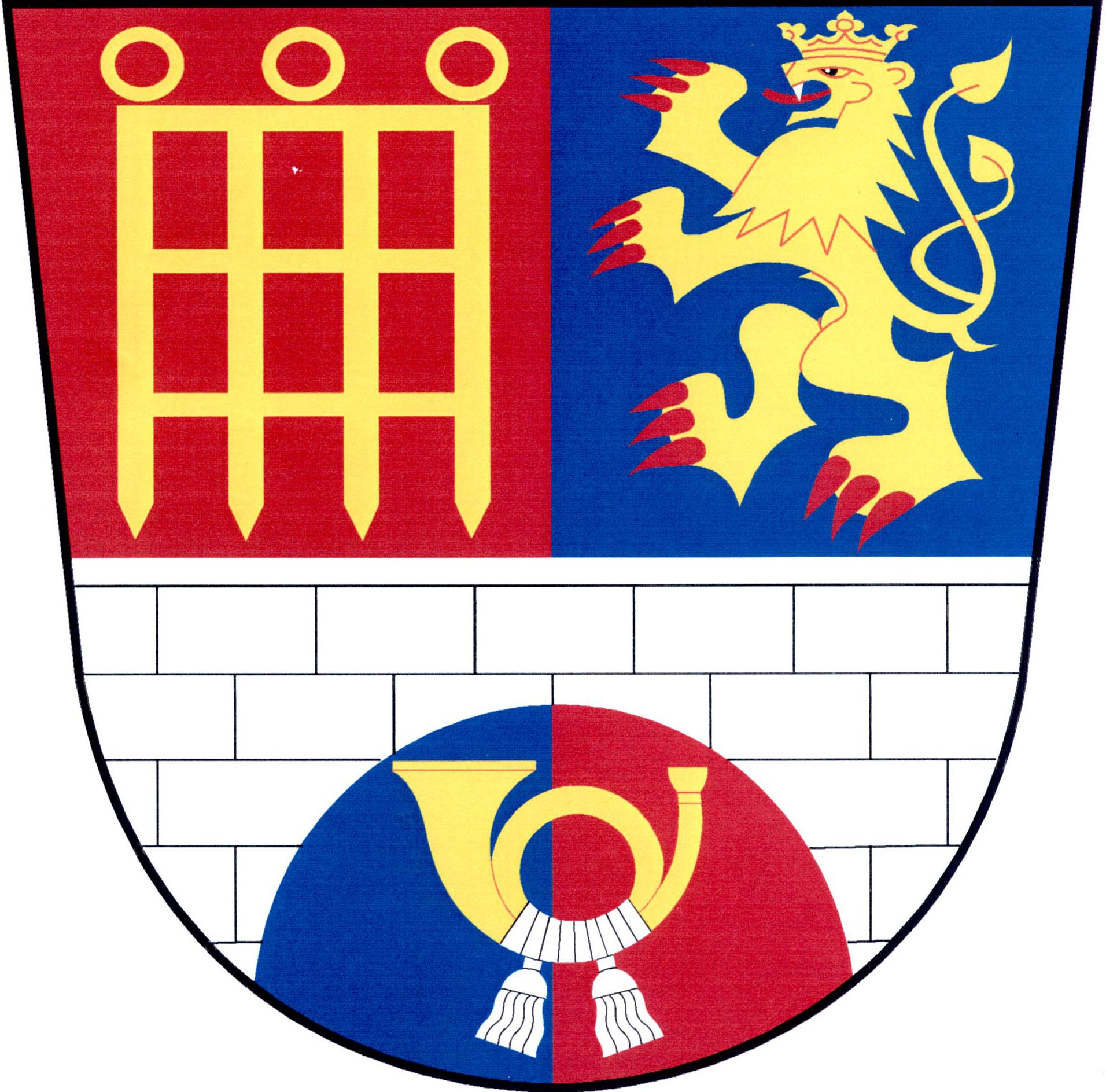
- Flag Coat of arms

- Location in the Czech Republic
- Coordinates: 48°58′51″N 15°53′10″E
- Country: Czech Republic
- Region: South Moravian
- District: Znojmo
- First mentioned: 1700

Area
  - Total: 2.16 km^{2} (0.83 sq mi)
- Elevation: 384 m (1,260 ft)

Population (2026-01-01)
  - Total: 221
  - Density: 102/km^{2} (265/sq mi)
- Time zone: UTC+1 (CET)
  - Summer (DST): UTC+2 (CEST)
- Postal code: 671 56
- Website: www.greslovemyto.cz

Grešlové Mýto (German: Gröschlmaut) is a municipality and village in Znojmo District in the South Moravian Region of the Czech Republic. It has about 200 inhabitants.

Grešlové Mýto lies on the Jevišovka River, approximately 18 kilometres (11 mi) north-west of Znojmo, 59 km (37 mi) south-west of Brno, and 163 km (101 mi) south-east of Prague.

== Demographics ==
Historical population
Year	Pop.	±%
1869	226	—
1880	234	+3.5%
1890	231	−1.3%
1900	224	−3.0%
1910	252	+12.5%
1921	265	+5.2%
1930	264	−0.4%
1950	258	−2.3%
1961	309	+19.8%
1970	277	−10.4%
1980	227	−18.1%
1991	186	−18.1%
2001	193	+3.8%
2011	191	−1.0%
2021	195	+2.1%
Source: Censuses
