= Tvořihráz =

- Municipality
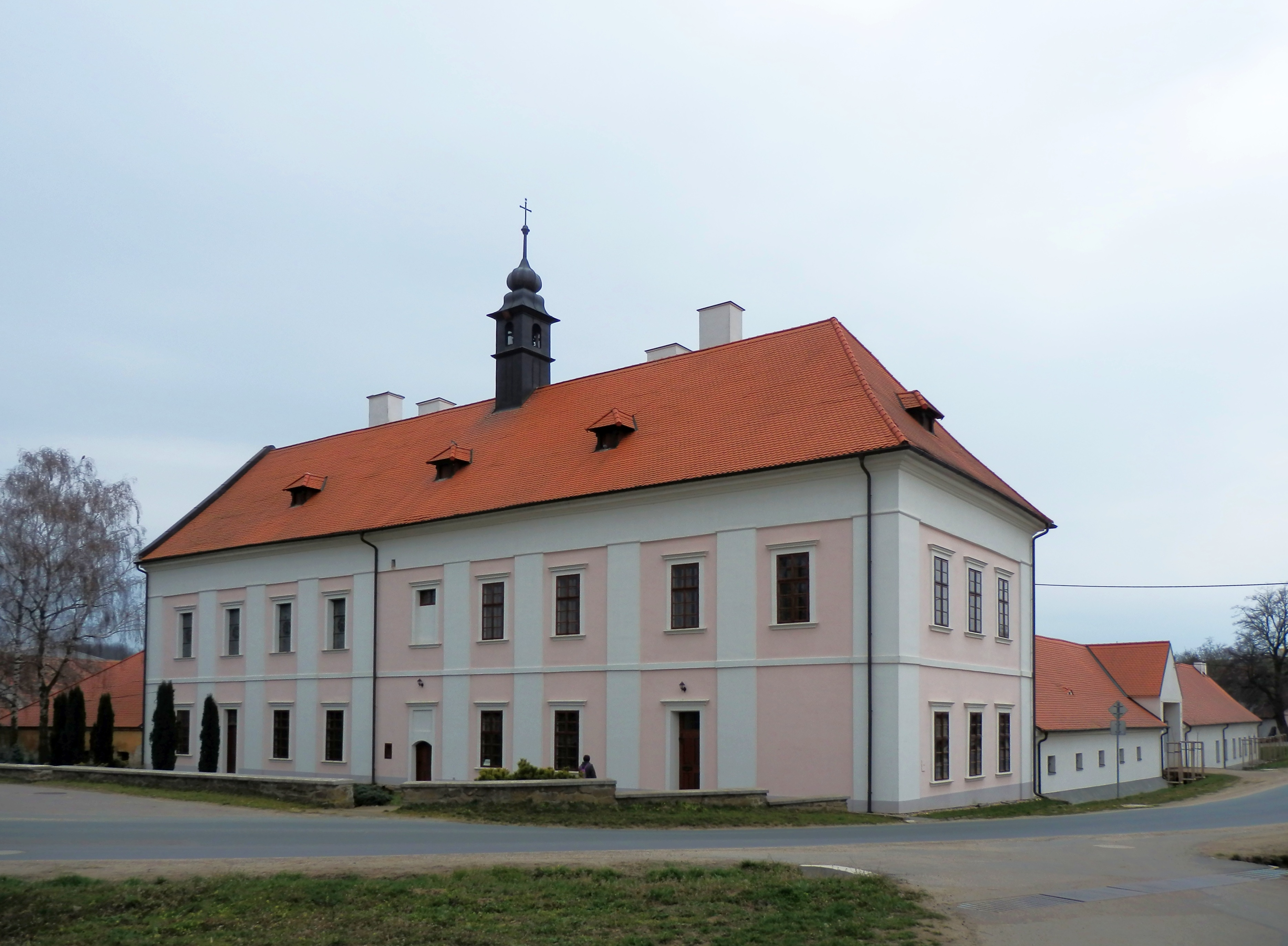
- Tvořihráz Castle

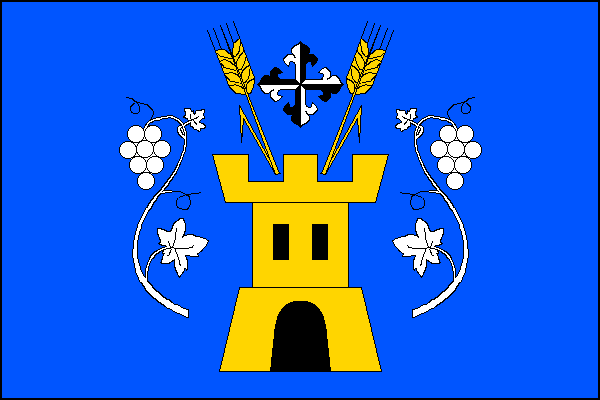
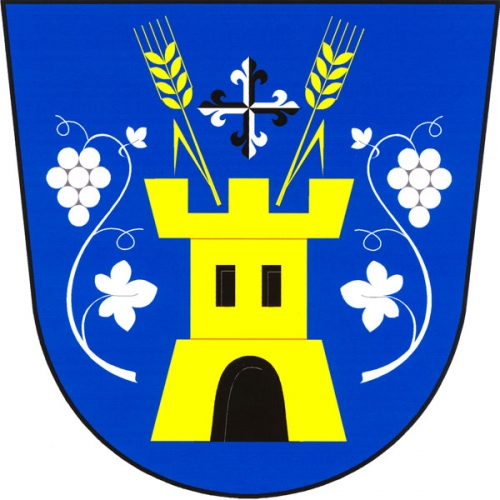
- Flag Coat of arms

- Location in the Czech Republic
- Coordinates: 48°55′3″N 16°8′9″E
- Country: Czech Republic
- Region: South Moravian
- District: Znojmo
- First mentioned: 1349

Area
  - Total: 10.93 km^{2} (4.22 sq mi)
- Elevation: 315 m (1,033 ft)

Population (2026-01-01)
  - Total: 432
  - Density: 39.5/km^{2} (102/sq mi)
- Time zone: UTC+1 (CET)
  - Summer (DST): UTC+2 (CEST)
- Postal code: 671 34
- Website: www.tvorihraz.cz

Tvořihráz is a municipality and village in Znojmo District in the South Moravian Region of the Czech Republic. It has about 400 inhabitants.

Tvořihráz lies on the Jevišovka River, approximately 11 kilometres (7 mi) north-east of Znojmo, 48 km (30 mi) southwest of Brno, and 180 km (110 mi) southeast of Prague.

== Demographics ==
Historical population
Year	Pop.	±%
1869	614	—
1880	650	+5.9%
1890	693	+6.6%
1900	712	+2.7%
1910	713	+0.1%
1921	717	+0.6%
1930	681	−5.0%
1950	564	−17.2%
1961	579	+2.7%
1970	539	−6.9%
1980	488	−9.5%
1991	397	−18.6%
2001	371	−6.5%
2011	366	−1.3%
2021	416	+13.7%
Source: Censuses
