= Častohostice =

- Municipality
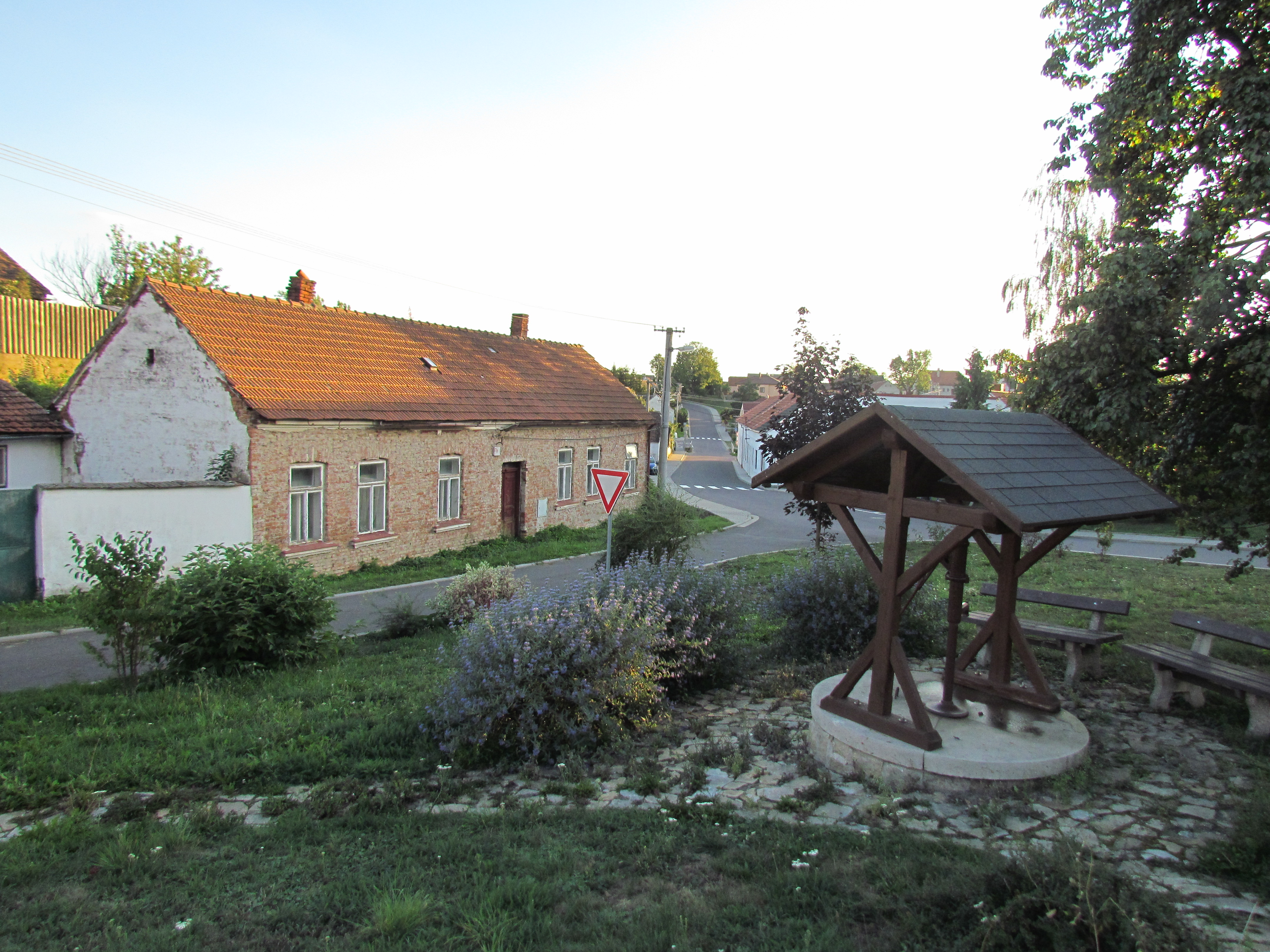
- Centre of Častohostice

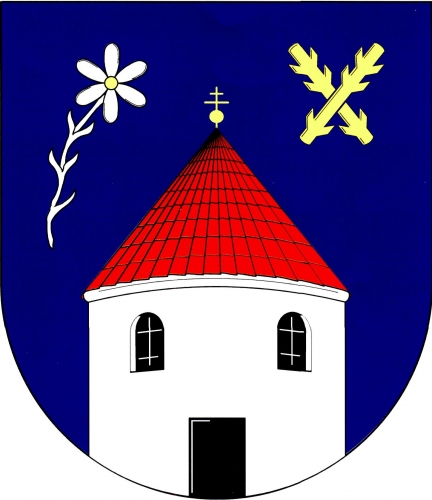
- Flag Coat of arms

- Location in the Czech Republic
- Coordinates: 49°0′52″N 15°49′9″E
- Country: Czech Republic
- Region: Vysočina
- District: Třebíč
- First mentioned: 1459

Area
  - Total: 3.50 km^{2} (1.35 sq mi)
- Elevation: 415 m (1,362 ft)

Population (2026-01-01)
  - Total: 193
  - Density: 55.1/km^{2} (143/sq mi)
- Time zone: UTC+1 (CET)
  - Summer (DST): UTC+2 (CEST)
- Postal code: 676 02
- Website: www.castohostice.cz

Častohostice is a municipality and village in Třebíč District in the Vysočina Region of the Czech Republic. It has about 200 inhabitants.

Častohostice lies on the Jevišovka River, approximately 23 kilometres (14 mi) south of Třebíč, 46 km (29 mi) south of Jihlava, and 156 km (97 mi) south-east of Prague.

== Demographics ==
Historical population
| Year | Pop. | ±% |
|---|---|---|
| 1869 | 307 | — |
| 1880 | 336 | +9.4% |
| 1890 | 311 | −7.4% |
| 1900 | 307 | −1.3% |
| 1910 | 301 | −2.0% |
| 1921 | 310 | +3.0% |
| 1930 | 335 | +8.1% |
| 1950 | 274 | −18.2% |
| 1961 | 311 | +13.5% |
| 1970 | 263 | −15.4% |
| 1980 | 220 | −16.3% |
| 1991 | 200 | −9.1% |
| 2001 | 179 | −10.5% |
| 2011 | 196 | +9.5% |
| 2021 | 171 | −12.8% |
Source: Censuses
