= Střelice (Znojmo District) =

- Municipality
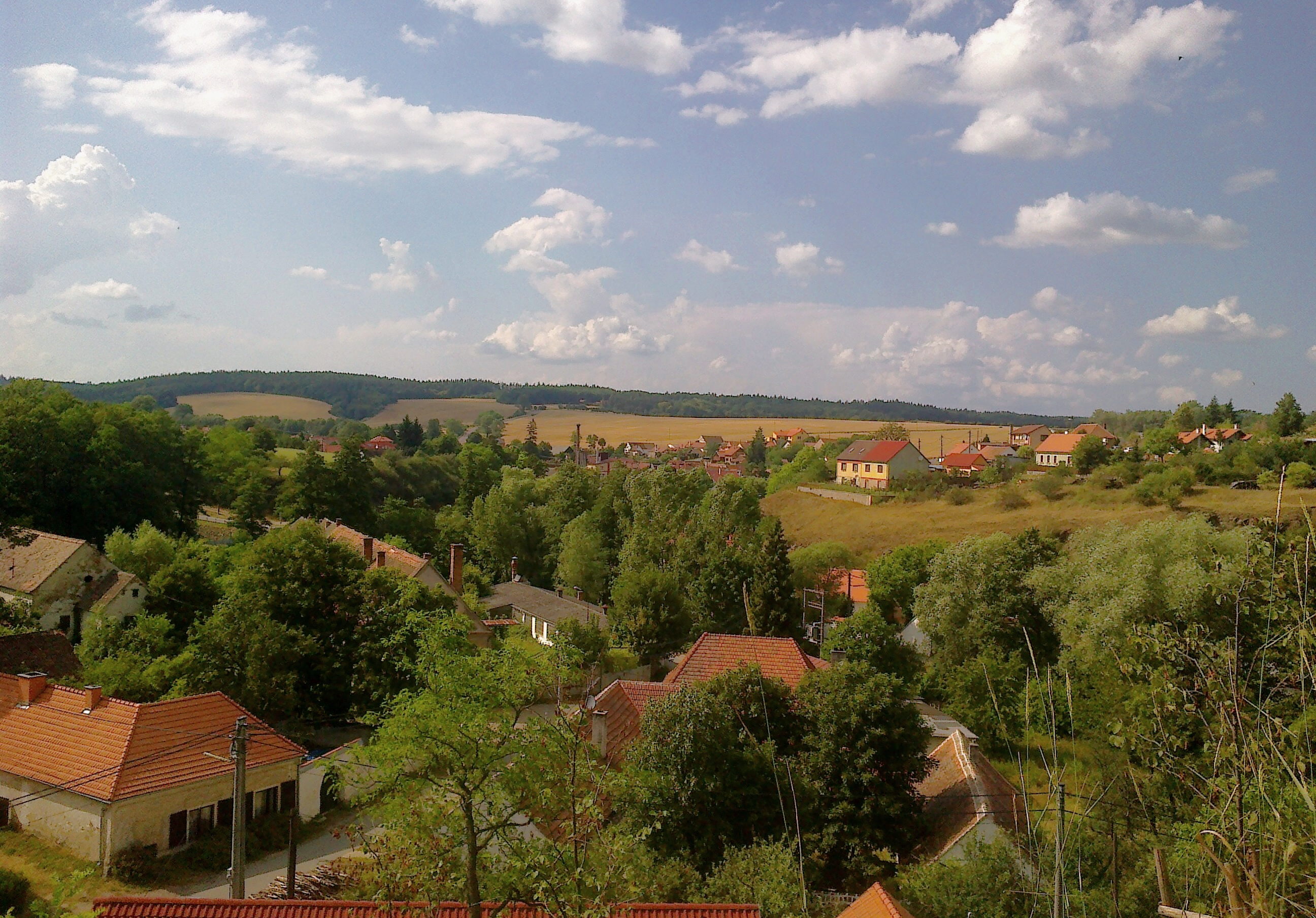
- View from the southeast

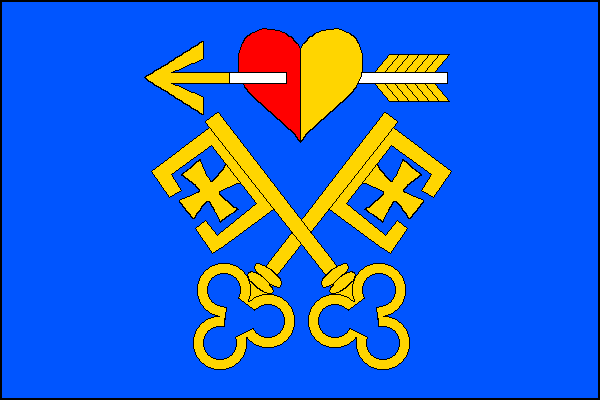
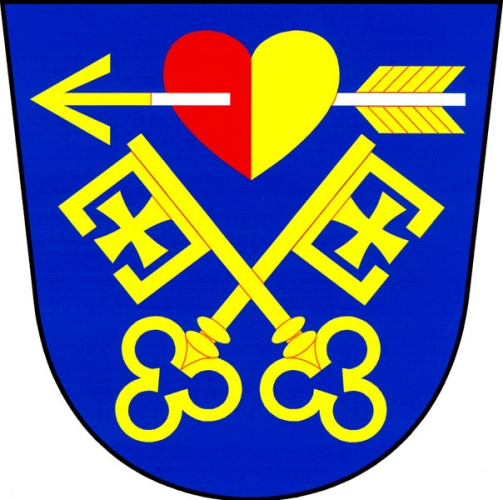
- Flag Coat of arms

- Location in the Czech Republic
- Coordinates: 48°59′39″N 15°58′59″E
- Country: Czech Republic
- Region: South Moravian
- District: Znojmo
- First mentioned: 1361

Area
  - Total: 12.16 km^{2} (4.70 sq mi)
- Elevation: 370 m (1,210 ft)

Population (2026-01-01)
  - Total: 170
  - Density: 14/km^{2} (36/sq mi)
- Time zone: UTC+1 (CET)
  - Summer (DST): UTC+2 (CEST)
- Postal code: 671 53
- Website: www.strelice-zn.cz

Střelice is a municipality and village in Znojmo District in the South Moravian Region of the Czech Republic. It has about 200 inhabitants.

Střelice lies on the Jevišovka River, approximately 18 kilometres (11 mi) north of Znojmo, 52 km (32 mi) south-west of Brno, and 165 km (103 mi) south-east of Prague.

== Demographics ==
Historical population
Year	Pop.	±%
1869	522	—
1880	574	+10.0%
1890	646	+12.5%
1900	610	−5.6%
1910	691	+13.3%
1921	626	−9.4%
1930	576	−8.0%
1950	407	−29.3%
1961	386	−5.2%
1970	349	−9.6%
1980	286	−18.1%
1991	210	−26.6%
2001	163	−22.4%
2011	151	−7.4%
2021	161	+6.6%
Source: Censuses
