= Moriz Winternitz =

Austrian Indologist (1863–1937)

Moriz Winternitz

Moriz Winternitz (Horn, December 23, 1863 – Prague, January 9, 1937) was a scholar from Austria who began his Indology contributions working with Max Müller at the Oxford University. An eminent Sanskrit scholar, he worked as a professor in Prague in the German part of Charles-Ferdinand University after 1902, for nearly thirty years. His Geschichte der indischen Literatur, published 1908–1922, offered a comprehensive literary history of Sanskrit texts. The contributions on a wide range of Sanskrit texts by Winternitz have been an influential resource for modern era studies on Hinduism, Buddhism and Jainism.

== Education ==
An Austrian Orientalist, he received his earliest education in the gymnasium of his native town, and in 1880 entered the University of Vienna, receiving the degree of Doctor of Philosophy in 1886. In 1888 he went to Oxford, where until 1892 he assisted the preparation of the second edition of the Rig-Veda (4 vols., Oxford, 1890–92), collating manuscripts and deciding on the adoption of many new readings. Winternitz remained in Oxford until 1898, acting in various educational capacities, such as German lecturer to the Association for Promoting the Higher Education of Women (1891–98), librarian of the Indian Institute at Oxford (1895), and frequently as examiner in German and Sanskrit both for the university and for the Indian Civil Service.

== Work ==
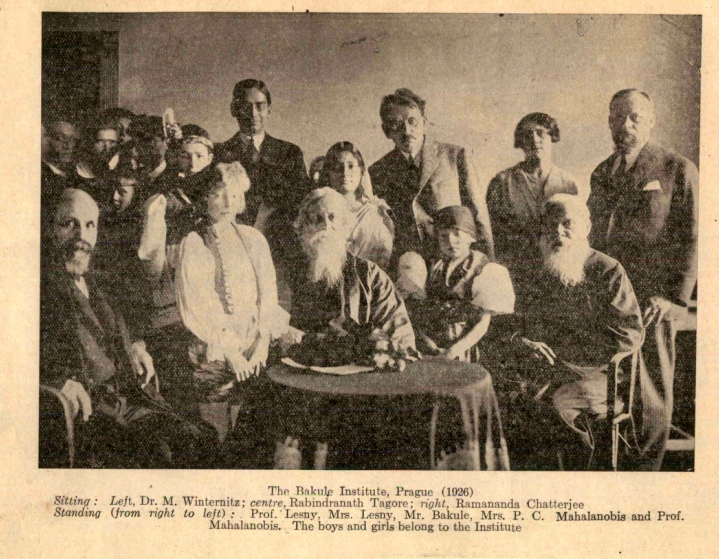
Winternitz (left) with Tagore and Mahalanobis, 1926

In 1899, attending the Oriental Congress in Rome, he proposed the establishment of a society dedicated to studying Sanskrit texts, and particularly noted the need for a new critical edition of the Hindu epic, the Mahabharata. In that same year, he went to Charles-Ferdinand University in Prague as privatdozent for Indology and general ethnology, and in 1902 was appointed to the professorship of Sanskrit (made vacant by the retirement of Ludwig) and of ethnology. The Winternitz family were friendly with Albert Einstein, when he was in Prague around 1911.

Rabindranath Tagore visited Prague in 1920 and met Winternitz. On an invitation from the poet, he went to Santiniketan and worked as a visiting professor from February 1923 to September 1924. During this time in India, he continued his advocacy for Mahabharata studies, working with the Bhandarkar Oriental Research Institute and advising them in editing their critical editions of the Mahabharata. He additionally published several research papers that studied the Mahabharata, including analyses on versions of the epic common in South India, and studies of the figure of Ganesha in the epic.

Among his students were Vincenc Lesný, Wilhelm Gampert and Otto Stein, who themselves went on to become prominent Indologists.

In addition to valuable contributions on Sanskrit and ethnology to various scientific journals, Winternitz edited the Apastambiya Gṛihyasutra (Vienna, 1887) and the Mantrapaṭha, or the Prayer-Book of the Apastambins (part i, Oxford, 1897); translated Müller's Anthropological Religion and his Theosophy, or Psychological Religion into German (Leipzig, 1894–95); and published Das Altindische Hochzeitsrituell (Vienna, 1892), which also contains valuable ethnological material; A Catalogue of South Indian Manuscripts Belonging to the Royal Asiatic Society of Great Britain and Ireland (London, 1902); and Geschichte der Indischen Literatur (part i, Leipzig, 1905). He also published expansive studies of Indian literature, publishing a two-volume book on the same.

== See also ==
- Moriz Winternitz (Longer biography, in German)
- Wilhelm Winternitz
