= Komárovice =

- Municipality
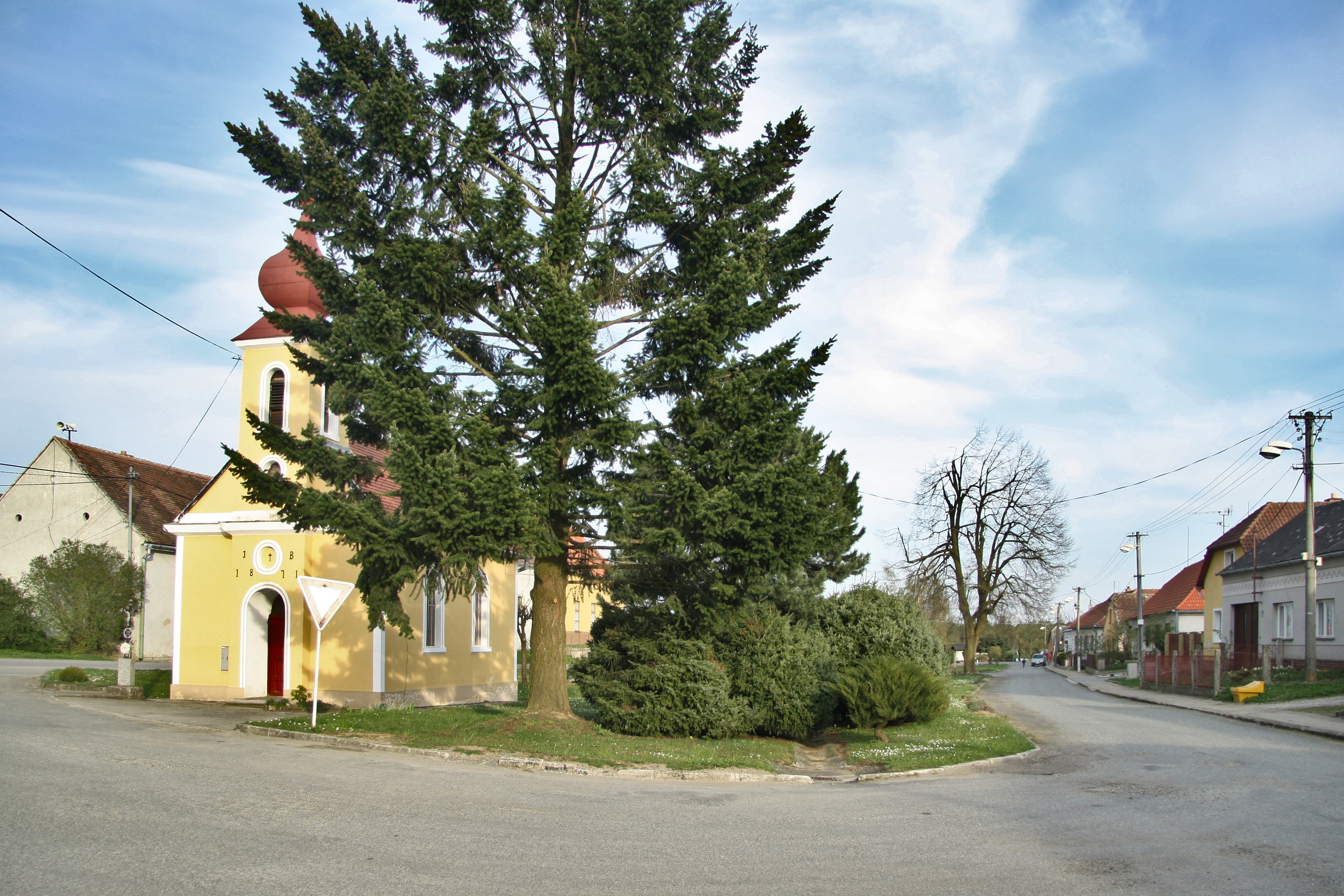
- Centre of Komárovice

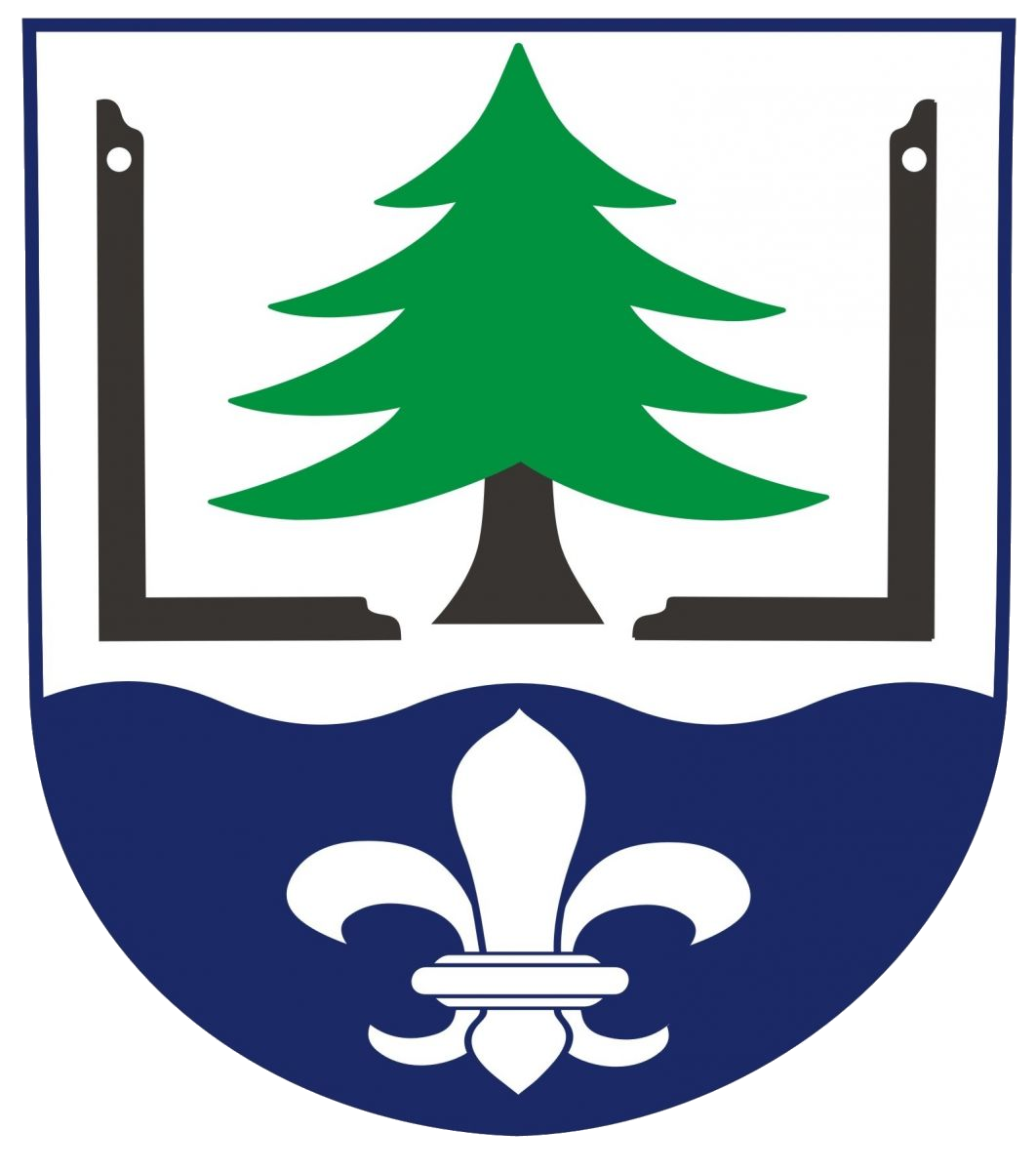
- Flag Coat of arms

- Location in the Czech Republic
- Coordinates: 49°4′12″N 15°42′4″E
- Country: Czech Republic
- Region: Vysočina
- District: Třebíč
- First mentioned: 1366

Area
  - Total: 3.11 km^{2} (1.20 sq mi)
- Elevation: 533 m (1,749 ft)

Population (2026-01-01)
  - Total: 113
  - Density: 36.3/km^{2} (94.1/sq mi)
- Time zone: UTC+1 (CET)
  - Summer (DST): UTC+2 (CEST)
- Postal code: 675 26
- Website: www.komarovice.cz

Komárovice is a municipality and village in Třebíč District in the Vysočina Region of the Czech Republic. It has about 100 inhabitants.

== Geography ==
Komárovice is located about 20 kilometres (12 mi) southwest of Třebíč and 37 km (23 mi) south of Jihlava. It lies on the border between the Jevišovice Uplands and Křižanov Highlands. The highest point is the hill Láč at 587 m (1,926 ft) above sea level. The Jevišovka River originates in the municipal territory.

== History ==
The first written mention of Komárovice is from 1366.

== Demographics ==
Historical population

| Year | Pop. | ±% |
|---|---|---|
| 1869 | 296 | — |
| 1880 | 286 | −3.4% |
| 1890 | 280 | −2.1% |
| 1900 | 284 | +1.4% |
| 1910 | 271 | −4.6% |

| Year | Pop. | ±% |
|---|---|---|
| 1921 | 281 | +3.7% |
| 1930 | 249 | −11.4% |
| 1950 | 221 | −11.2% |
| 1961 | 225 | +1.8% |
| 1970 | 204 | −9.3% |

| Year | Pop. | ±% |
|---|---|---|
| 1980 | 170 | −16.7% |
| 1991 | 126 | −25.9% |
| 2001 | 118 | −6.3% |
| 2011 | 124 | +5.1% |
| 2021 | 105 | −15.3% |

Source: Censuses

== Transport ==
There are no railways or major roads passing through the municipality.

== Sights ==
There are no protected cultural monuments in the municipality. The main landmark of Komárovice is the Chapel of Saint Joseph.

== Notable people ==
- Vincenc Lesný (1882–1953), indologist and translator
