= Jevišovka =

- Municipality
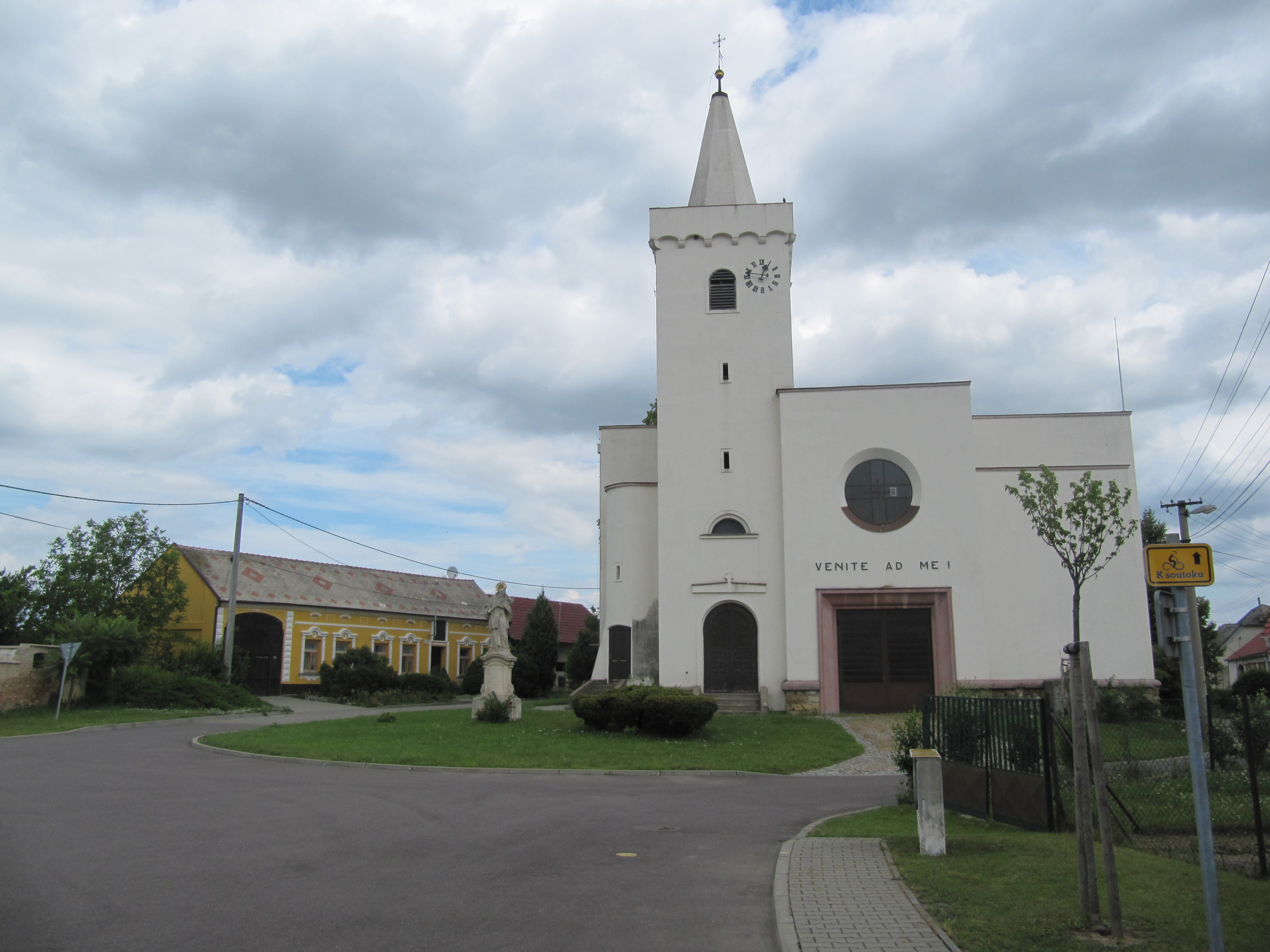
- Church of Saint Cunigunde

- Flag Coat of arms

- Location in the Czech Republic
- Coordinates: 48°49′43″N 16°27′58″E
- Country: Czech Republic
- Region: South Moravian
- District: Břeclav
- First mentioned: 1353

Area
  - Total: 12.65 km^{2} (4.88 sq mi)
- Elevation: 177 m (581 ft)

Population (2026-01-01)
  - Total: 662
  - Density: 52.3/km^{2} (136/sq mi)
- Time zone: UTC+1 (CET)
  - Summer (DST): UTC+2 (CEST)
- Postal code: 691 83
- Website: www.jevisovka.cz

Jevišovka (until 1949 Frélichov; German: Fröllersdorf, Croatian: Frjelištorf, Frielištof) is a municipality and village in Břeclav District in the South Moravian Region of the Czech Republic. It has about 700 inhabitants.

== Geography ==
Jevišovka is located about 32 kilometres (20 mi) west of Břeclav and 40 km (25 mi) south of Brno. It lies in the Dyje–Svratka Valley. It is situated at the confluence of the Jevišovka and Thaya rivers.

== History ==
The first written mention of Jevišovka is from 1353. The village was founded by German colonists in the early 13th century. From the late 14th century until 1848, Jevišovka was property of the Liechtenstein family as part of the Drnholec estate.

== Demographics ==
Jevišovka is one of the three South Moravian municipalities with a historical population of Moravian Croats.

Historical population

Year	Pop.	±%
1869	977	—
1880	1,126	+15.3%
1890	1,147	+1.9%
1900	1,160	+1.1%
1910	1,227	+5.8%

Year	Pop.	±%
1921	1,252	+2.0%
1930	1,268	+1.3%
1950	808	−36.3%
1961	734	−9.2%
1970	696	−5.2%

Year	Pop.	±%
1980	621	−10.8%
1991	531	−14.5%
2001	554	+4.3%
2011	654	+18.1%
2021	681	+4.1%

Source: Censuses

== Transport ==
Jevišovka is located on the railway line Znojmo–Břeclav.

== Sights ==
The main landmark of Jevišovka is the Church of Saint Cunigunde. It was built in the Functionalist style in 1931–1936, but it has a Gothic tower that has been preserved from the original church, which stood on the site.
