= Výrovice =

- Municipality
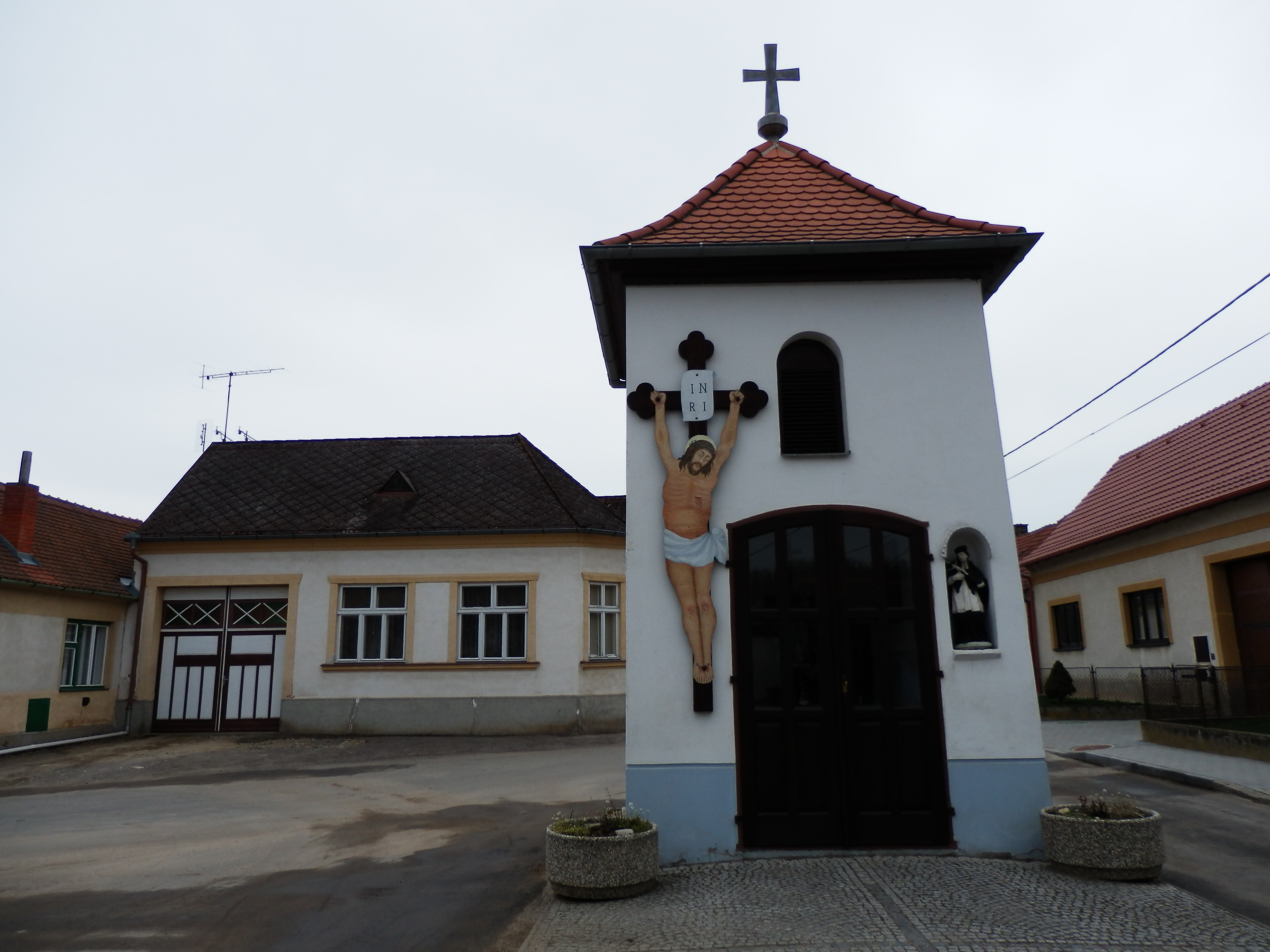
- Belfry

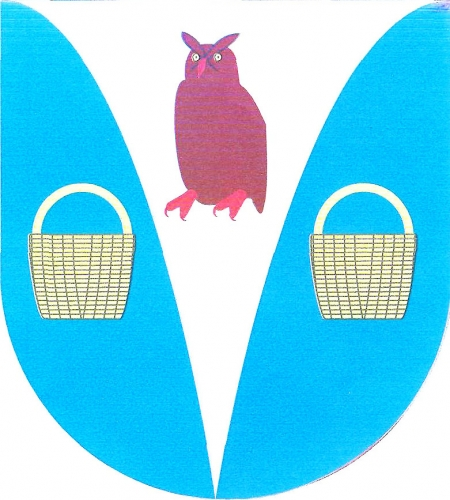
- Flag Coat of arms

- Location in the Czech Republic
- Coordinates: 48°55′42″N 16°7′13″E
- Country: Czech Republic
- Region: South Moravian
- District: Znojmo
- First mentioned: 1299

Area
  - Total: 4.93 km^{2} (1.90 sq mi)
- Elevation: 220 m (720 ft)

Population (2026-01-01)
  - Total: 188
  - Density: 38.1/km^{2} (98.8/sq mi)
- Time zone: UTC+1 (CET)
  - Summer (DST): UTC+2 (CEST)
- Postal code: 671 34
- Website: www.vyrovice.cz

Výrovice is a municipality and village in Znojmo District in the South Moravian Region of the Czech Republic. It has about 200 inhabitants.

Výrovice lies on the Jevišovka River, approximately 11 kilometres (7 mi) north-east of Znojmo, 47 km (29 mi) south-west of Brno, and 178 km (111 mi) south-east of Prague.

== History ==
The first written mention of Výrovice is in a deed of King Wenceslaus II from 1299.

== Demographics ==
Historical population
| Year | Pop. | ±% |
|---|---|---|
| 1869 | 326 | — |
| 1880 | 375 | +15.0% |
| 1890 | 417 | +11.2% |
| 1900 | 388 | −7.0% |
| 1910 | 376 | −3.1% |
| 1921 | 387 | +2.9% |
| 1930 | 366 | −5.4% |
| 1950 | 280 | −23.5% |
| 1961 | 281 | +0.4% |
| 1970 | 228 | −18.9% |
| 1980 | 188 | −17.5% |
| 1991 | 160 | −14.9% |
| 2001 | 166 | +3.8% |
| 2011 | 167 | +0.6% |
| 2021 | 166 | −0.6% |
Source: Censuses
