= Borotice (Znojmo District) =

- Municipality
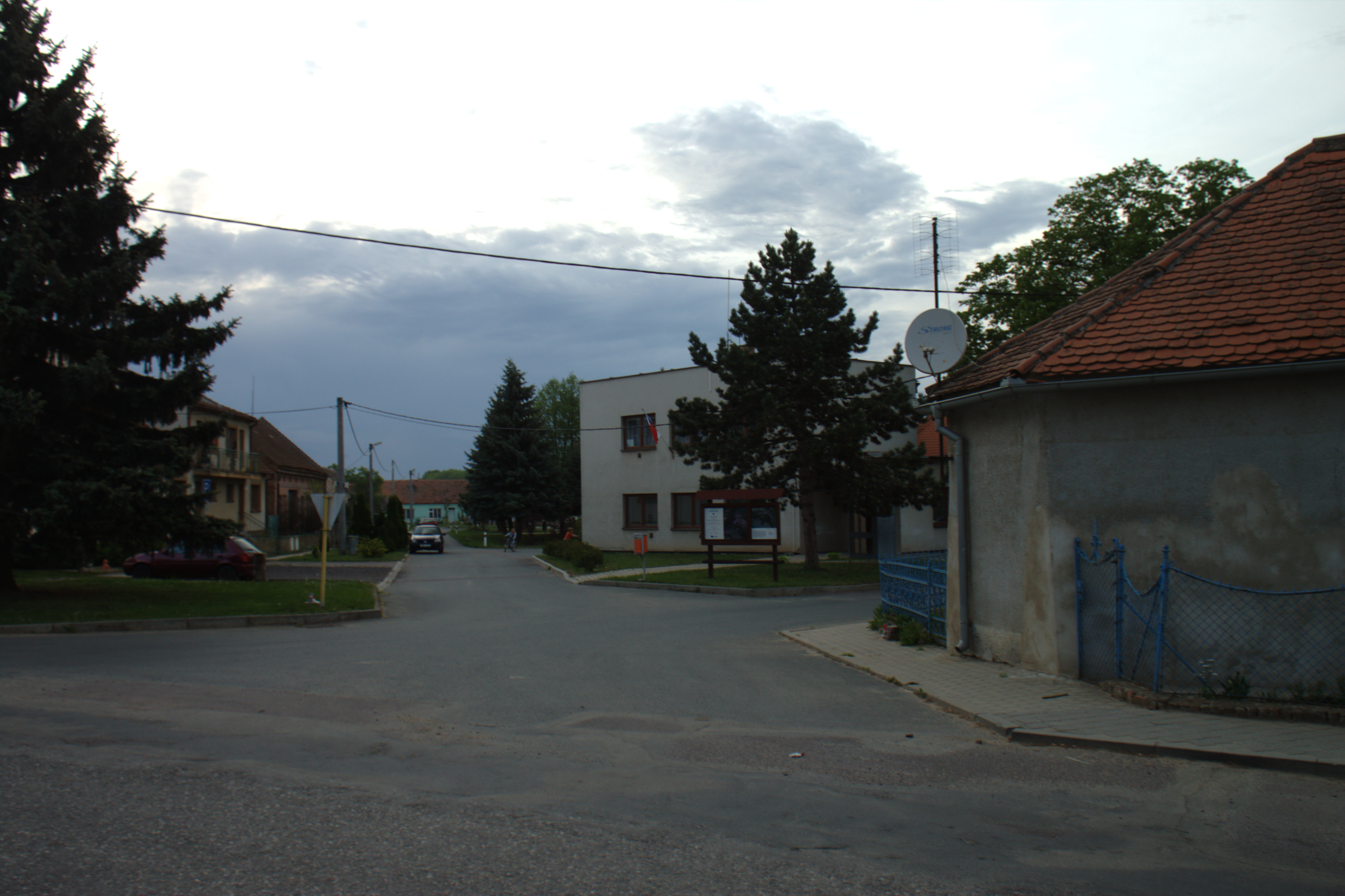
- Centre of Borotice

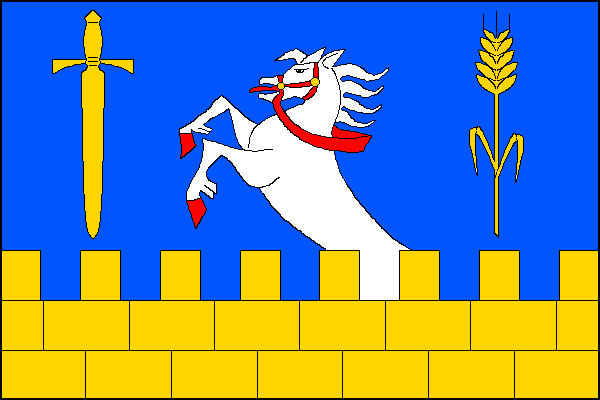
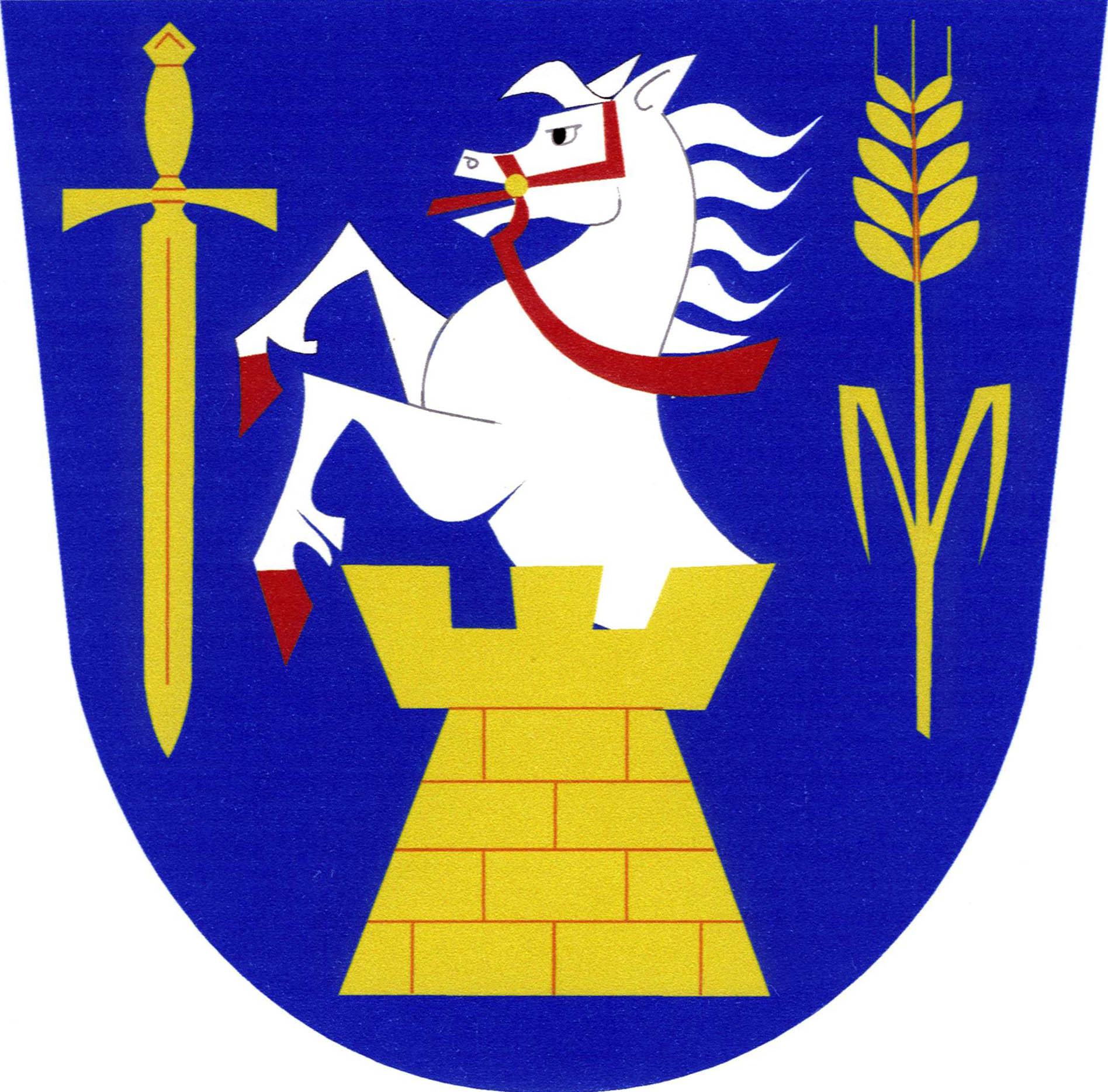
- Flag Coat of arms

- Location in the Czech Republic
- Coordinates: 48°51′26″N 16°14′33″E
- Country: Czech Republic
- Region: South Moravian
- District: Znojmo
- First mentioned: 1283

Area
  - Total: 12.06 km^{2} (4.66 sq mi)
- Elevation: 197 m (646 ft)

Population (2026-01-01)
  - Total: 415
  - Density: 34.4/km^{2} (89.1/sq mi)
- Time zone: UTC+1 (CET)
  - Summer (DST): UTC+2 (CEST)
- Postal code: 671 65
- Website: www.borotice.cz

Borotice is a municipality and village in Znojmo District in the South Moravian Region of the Czech Republic. It has about 400 inhabitants.

Borotice lies on the Jevišovka River, approximately 16 kilometres (10 mi) east of Znojmo, 47 km (29 mi) south-west of Brno, and 190 km (120 mi) south-east of Prague.

== Demographics ==
Historical population
| Year | Pop. | ±% |
|---|---|---|
| 1869 | 696 | — |
| 1880 | 755 | +8.5% |
| 1890 | 726 | −3.8% |
| 1900 | 790 | +8.8% |
| 1910 | 833 | +5.4% |
| 1921 | 759 | −8.9% |
| 1930 | 741 | −2.4% |
| 1950 | 409 | −44.8% |
| 1961 | 422 | +3.2% |
| 1970 | 399 | −5.5% |
| 1980 | 414 | +3.8% |
| 1991 | 363 | −12.3% |
| 2001 | 372 | +2.5% |
| 2011 | 398 | +7.0% |
| 2021 | 406 | +2.0% |
Source: Censuses
