= Plaveč (Znojmo District) =

- Municipality
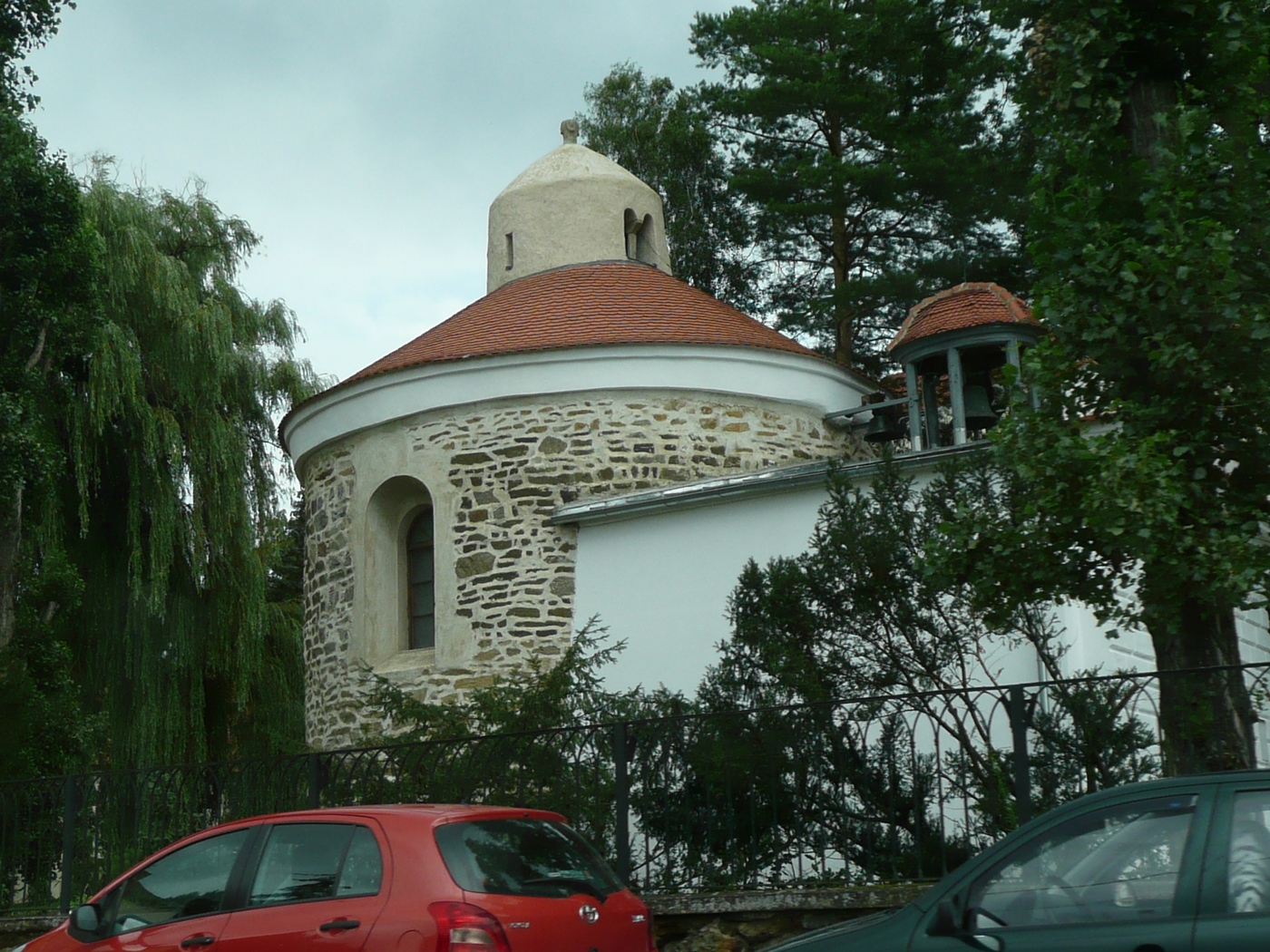
- Romanesque rotunda

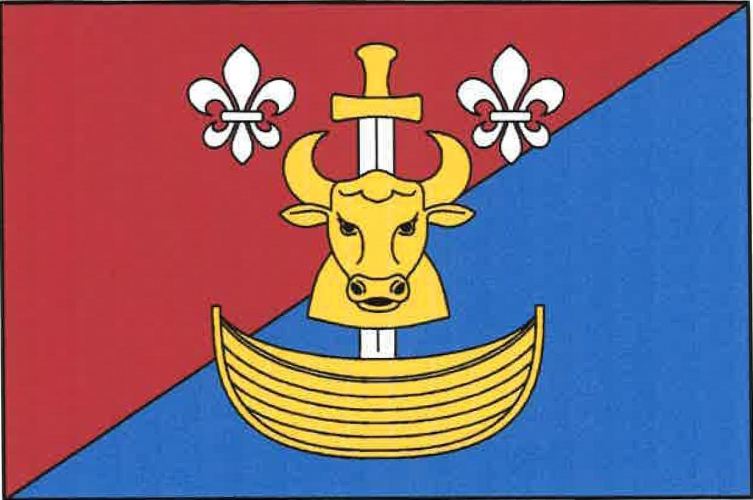
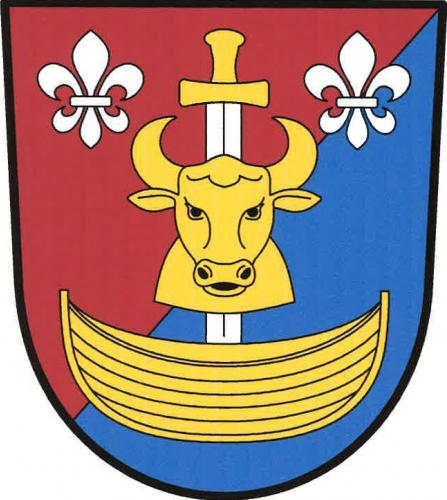
- Flag Coat of arms

- Location in the Czech Republic
- Coordinates: 48°55′44″N 16°4′48″E
- Country: Czech Republic
- Region: South Moravian
- District: Znojmo
- First mentioned: 1234

Area
  - Total: 10.34 km^{2} (3.99 sq mi)
- Elevation: 240 m (790 ft)

Population (2026-01-01)
  - Total: 452
  - Density: 43.7/km^{2} (113/sq mi)
- Time zone: UTC+1 (CET)
  - Summer (DST): UTC+2 (CEST)
- Postal code: 671 32
- Website: www.obecplavec.cz

Plaveč is a municipality and village in Znojmo District in the South Moravian Region of the Czech Republic. It has about 500 inhabitants.

Plaveč lies on the Jevišovka River, approximately 10 kilometres (6 mi) north of Znojmo, 50 km (31 mi) south-west of Brno, and 176 km (109 mi) south-east of Prague.

== Demographics ==
Historical population
Year	Pop.	±%
1869	405	—
1880	426	+5.2%
1890	404	−5.2%
1900	395	−2.2%
1910	437	+10.6%
1921	440	+0.7%
1930	439	−0.2%
1950	401	−8.7%
1961	540	+34.7%
1970	519	−3.9%
1980	505	−2.7%
1991	452	−10.5%
2001	447	−1.1%
2011	475	+6.3%
2021	490	+3.2%
Source: Censuses
