= Lechovice =

- Municipality
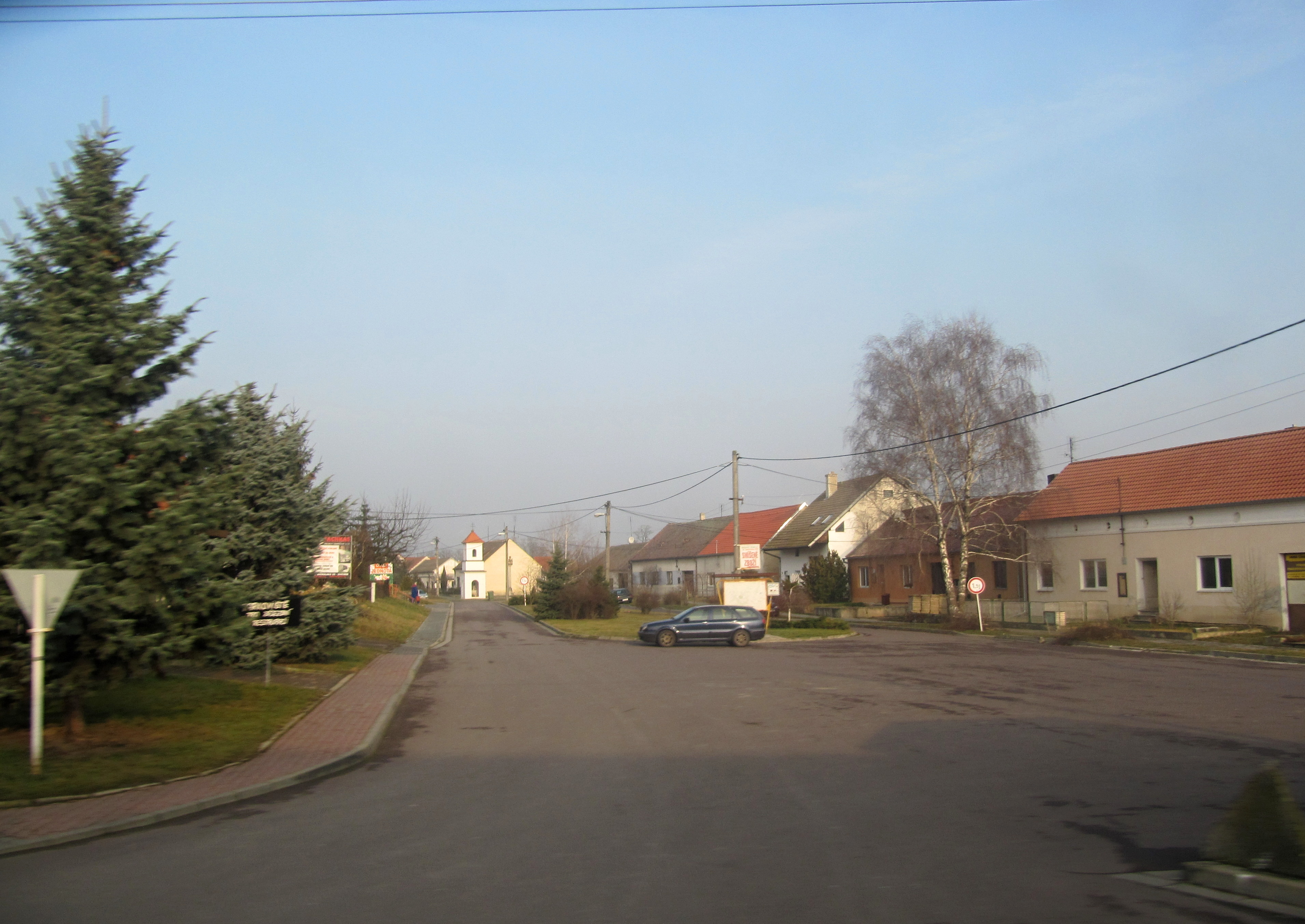
- Centre of Lechovice

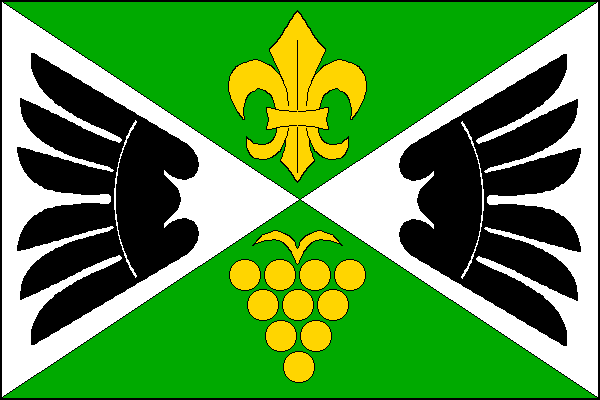
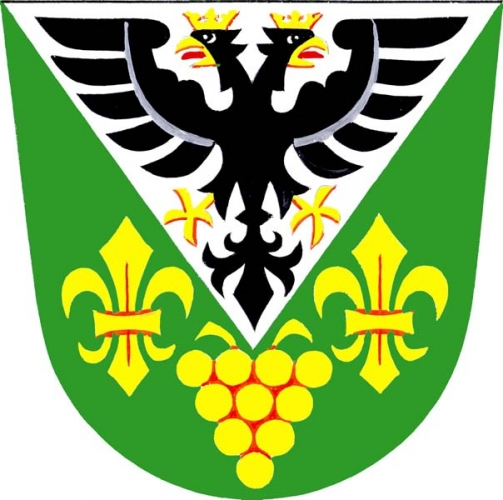
- Flag Coat of arms

- Location in the Czech Republic
- Coordinates: 48°52′22″N 16°13′19″E
- Country: Czech Republic
- Region: South Moravian
- District: Znojmo
- First mentioned: 1287

Area
  - Total: 5.73 km^{2} (2.21 sq mi)
- Elevation: 197 m (646 ft)

Population (2026-01-01)
  - Total: 555
  - Density: 96.9/km^{2} (251/sq mi)
- Time zone: UTC+1 (CET)
  - Summer (DST): UTC+2 (CEST)
- Postal code: 671 63
- Website: www.obec-lechovice.cz

Lechovice is a municipality and village in Znojmo District in the South Moravian Region of the Czech Republic. It has about 600 inhabitants.

Lechovice lies approximately 14 kilometres (9 mi) east of Znojmo, 47 km (29 mi) south-west of Brno, and 188 km (117 mi) south-east of Prague.

== Demographics ==
Historical population
Year	Pop.	±%
1869	485	—
1880	552	+13.8%
1890	613	+11.1%
1900	610	−0.5%
1910	610	+0.0%
1921	618	+1.3%
1930	575	−7.0%
1950	425	−26.1%
1961	451	+6.1%
1970	458	+1.6%
1980	480	+4.8%
1991	468	−2.5%
2001	412	−12.0%
2011	462	+12.1%
2021	530	+14.7%
Source: Censuses
