= Černín =

- Municipality
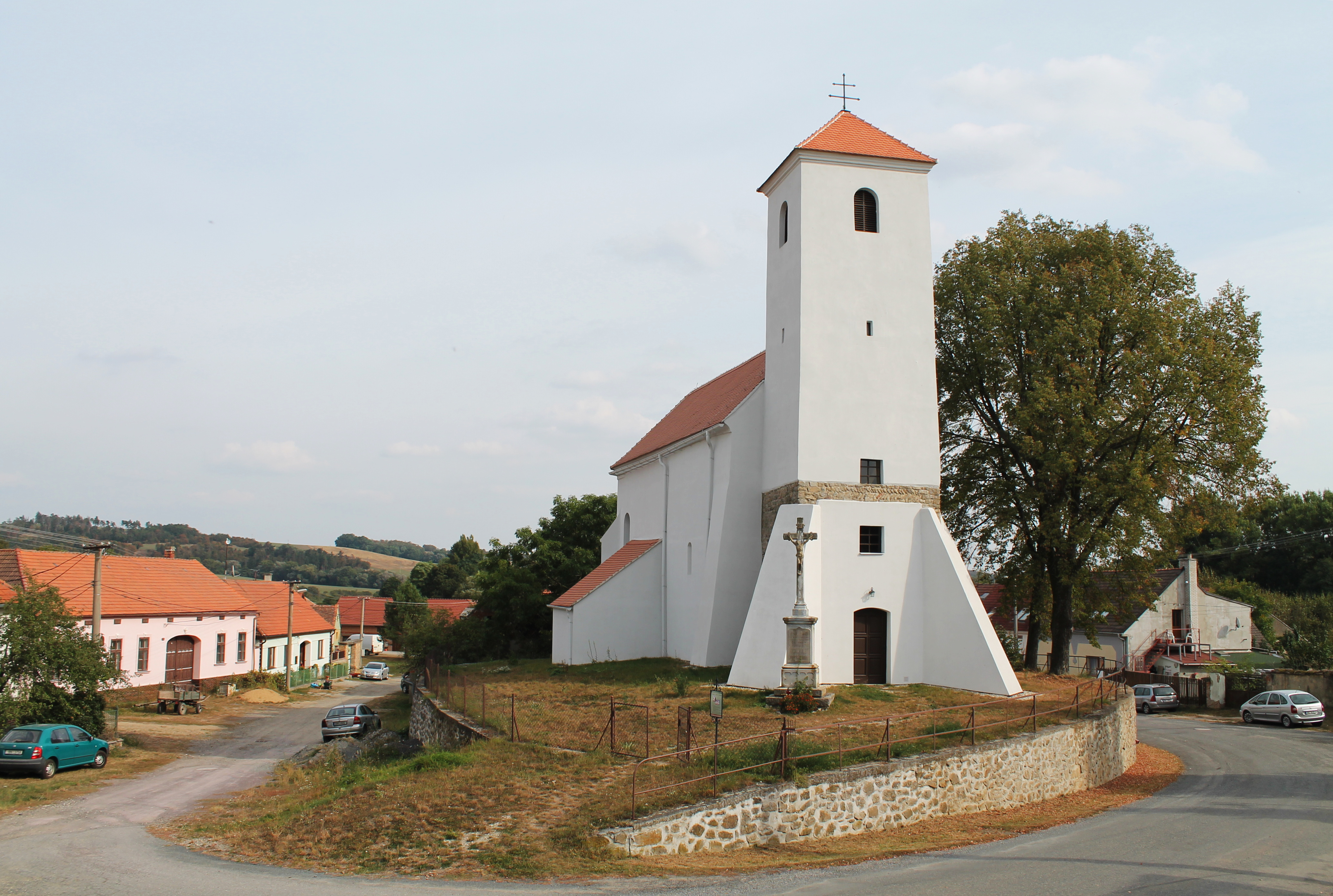
- Church of Saint James the Great

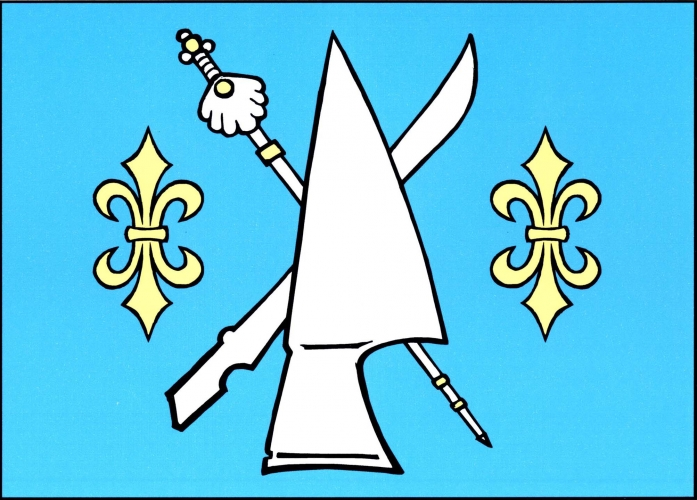
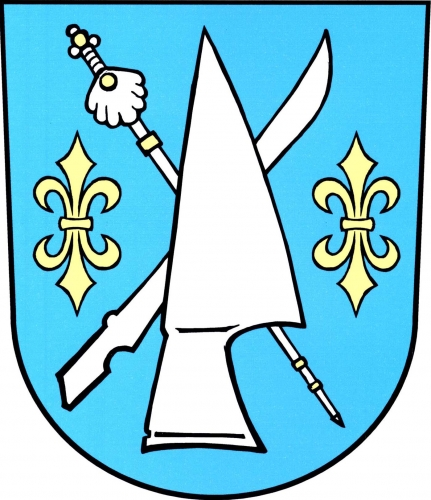
- Flag Coat of arms

- Location in the Czech Republic
- Coordinates: 48°58′59″N 16°1′15″E
- Country: Czech Republic
- Region: South Moravian
- District: Znojmo
- First mentioned: 1141

Area
  - Total: 9.93 km^{2} (3.83 sq mi)
- Elevation: 286 m (938 ft)

Population (2026-01-01)
  - Total: 173
  - Density: 17.4/km^{2} (45.1/sq mi)
- Time zone: UTC+1 (CET)
  - Summer (DST): UTC+2 (CEST)
- Postal code: 671 53
- Website: www.cernin-zn.cz

Černín is a municipality and village in Znojmo District in the South Moravian Region of the Czech Republic. It has about 200 inhabitants.

Černín lies on the Jevišovka River, approximately 16 kilometres (10 mi) north of Znojmo, 50 km (31 mi) south-west of Brno, and 169 km (105 mi) south-east of Prague.

== Demographics ==
Historical population
Year	Pop.	±%
1869	344	—
1880	355	+3.2%
1890	388	+9.3%
1900	382	−1.5%
1910	378	−1.0%
1921	444	+17.5%
1930	448	+0.9%
1950	310	−30.8%
1961	309	−0.3%
1970	252	−18.4%
1980	192	−23.8%
1991	165	−14.1%
2001	146	−11.5%
2011	134	−8.2%
2021	155	+15.7%
Source: Censuses
