= Šanov (Znojmo District) =

- Municipality
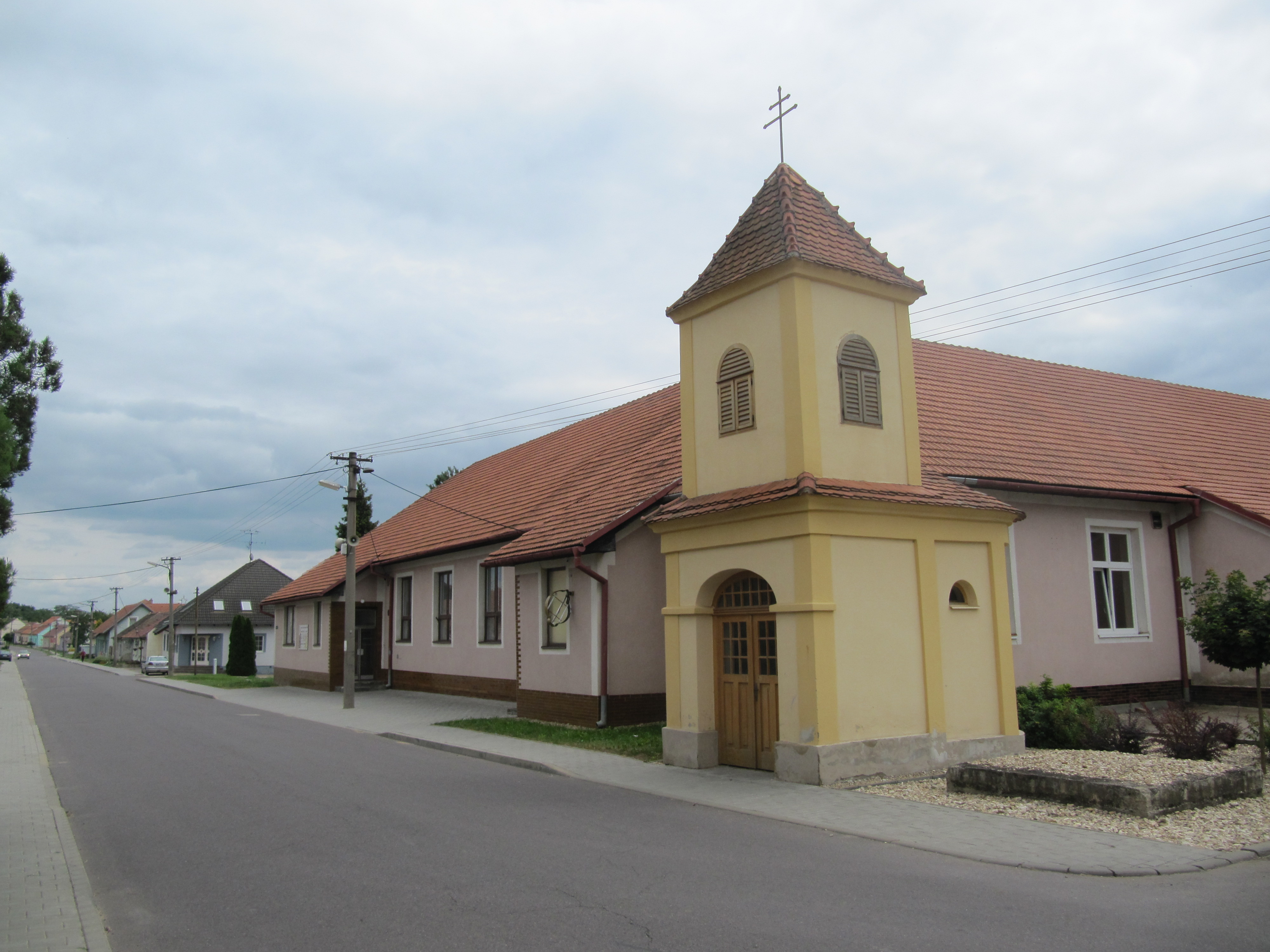
- Chapel and municipal office

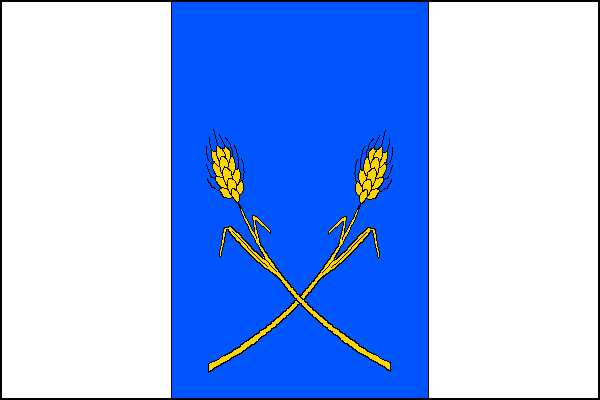
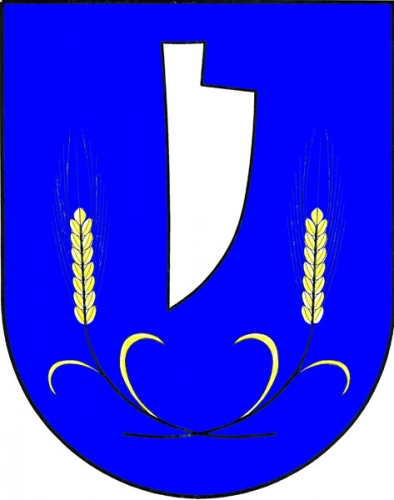
- Flag Coat of arms

- Location in the Czech Republic
- Coordinates: 48°48′3″N 16°22′43″E
- Country: Czech Republic
- Region: South Moravian
- District: Znojmo
- First mentioned: 1046

Area
  - Total: 20.36 km^{2} (7.86 sq mi)
- Elevation: 199 m (653 ft)

Population (2026-01-01)
  - Total: 1,729
  - Density: 84.92/km^{2} (219.9/sq mi)
- Time zone: UTC+1 (CET)
  - Summer (DST): UTC+2 (CEST)
- Postal codes: 671 64, 671 67, 671 68
- Website: www.sanov.cz

Šanov (German: Schönau) is a municipality and village in Znojmo District in the South Moravian Region of the Czech Republic. It has about 1,700 inhabitants.

Šanov lies approximately 25 kilometres (16 mi) east of Znojmo, 48 km (30 mi) south-west of Brno, and 200 km (120 mi) south-east of Prague.

== Demographics ==
Historical population
Year	Pop.	±%
1869	919	—
1880	1,215	+32.2%
1890	1,279	+5.3%
1900	1,312	+2.6%
1910	1,459	+11.2%
1921	1,576	+8.0%
1930	1,672	+6.1%
1950	1,104	−34.0%
1961	1,268	+14.9%
1970	1,275	+0.6%
1980	1,240	−2.7%
1991	1,120	−9.7%
2001	1,201	+7.2%
2011	1,451	+20.8%
2021	1,610	+11.0%
Source: Censuses
