= Žerotice =

- Municipality
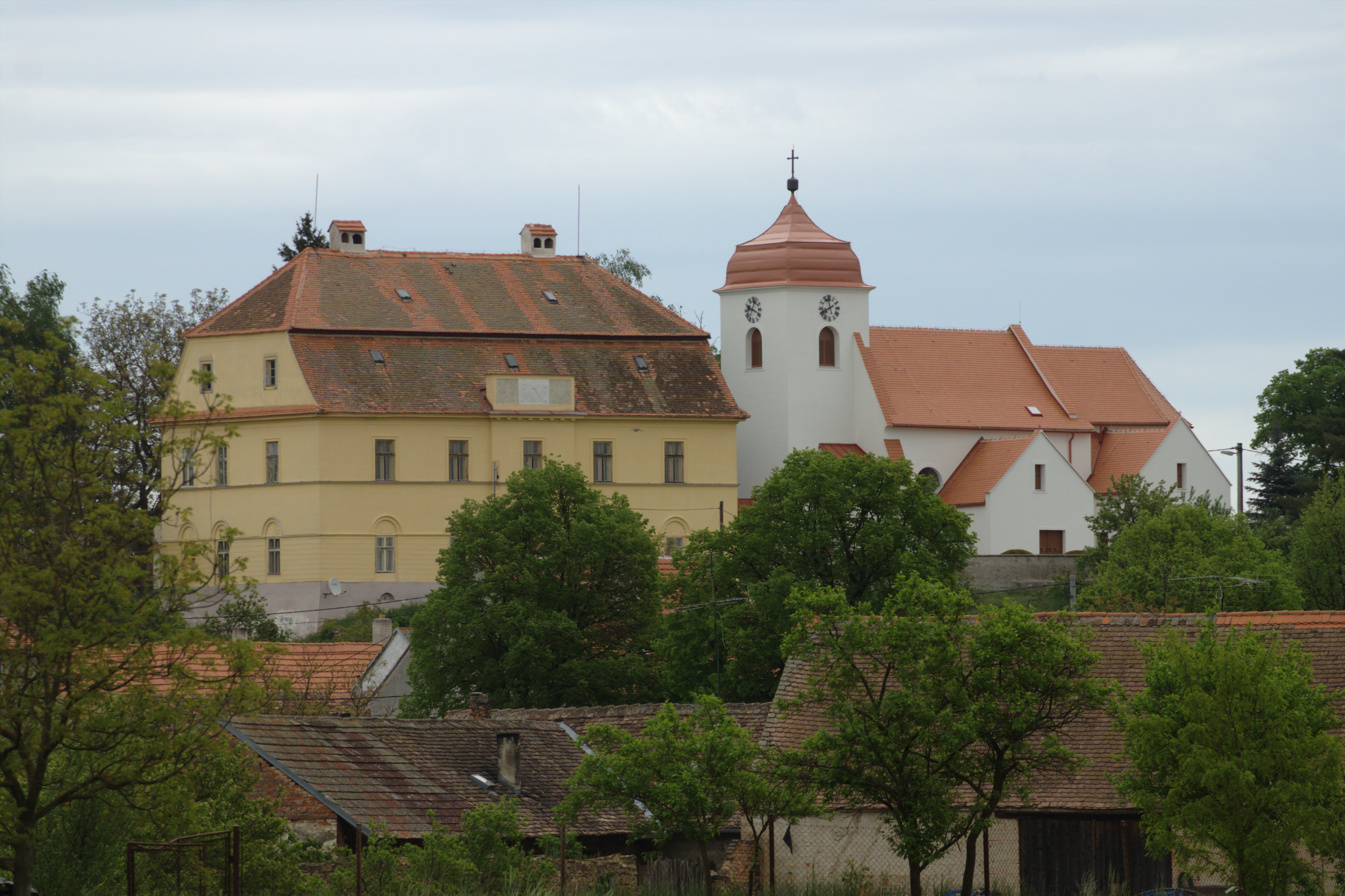
- Church of Saint Martin and rectory

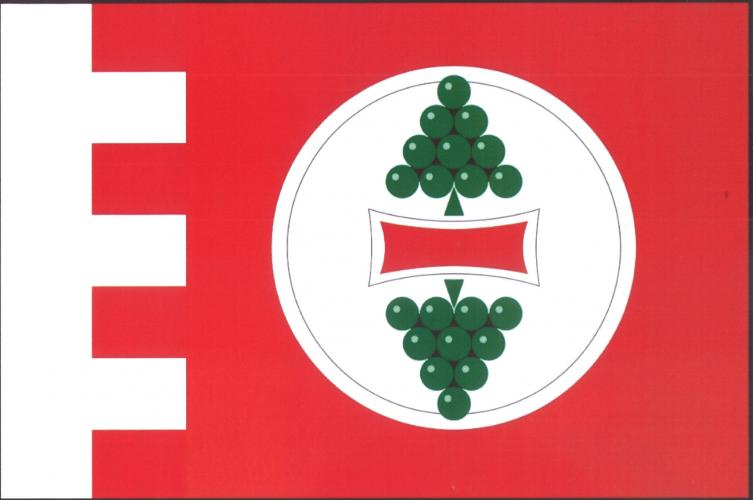
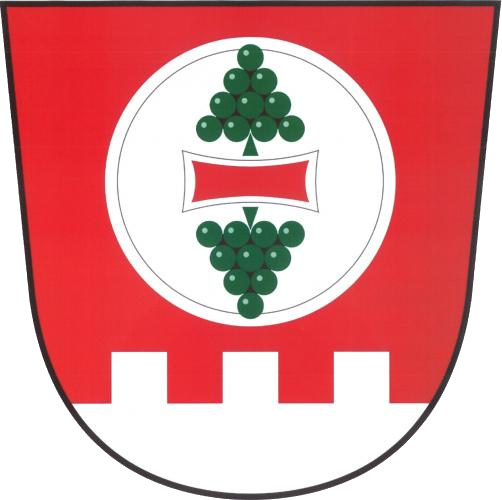
- Flag Coat of arms

- Location in the Czech Republic
- Coordinates: 48°55′36″N 16°10′7″E
- Country: Czech Republic
- Region: South Moravian
- District: Znojmo
- First mentioned: 1253

Area
  - Total: 5.74 km^{2} (2.22 sq mi)
- Elevation: 205 m (673 ft)

Population (2026-01-01)
  - Total: 348
  - Density: 60.6/km^{2} (157/sq mi)
- Time zone: UTC+1 (CET)
  - Summer (DST): UTC+2 (CEST)
- Postal code: 671 34
- Website: www.zerotice.cz

Žerotice is a municipality and village in Znojmo District in the South Moravian Region of the Czech Republic. It has about 300 inhabitants.

Žerotice lies approximately 13 kilometres (8 mi) north-east of Znojmo, 45 km (28 mi) south-west of Brno, and 181 km (112 mi) south-east of Prague.

== Demographics ==
Historical population
Year	Pop.	±%
1869	458	—
1880	495	+8.1%
1890	544	+9.9%
1900	560	+2.9%
1910	552	−1.4%
1921	499	−9.6%
1930	478	−4.2%
1950	475	−0.6%
1961	420	−11.6%
1970	366	−12.9%
1980	321	−12.3%
1991	268	−16.5%
2001	290	+8.2%
2011	312	+7.6%
2021	355	+13.8%
Source: Censuses
