= Thaya =

Thaya Dyje
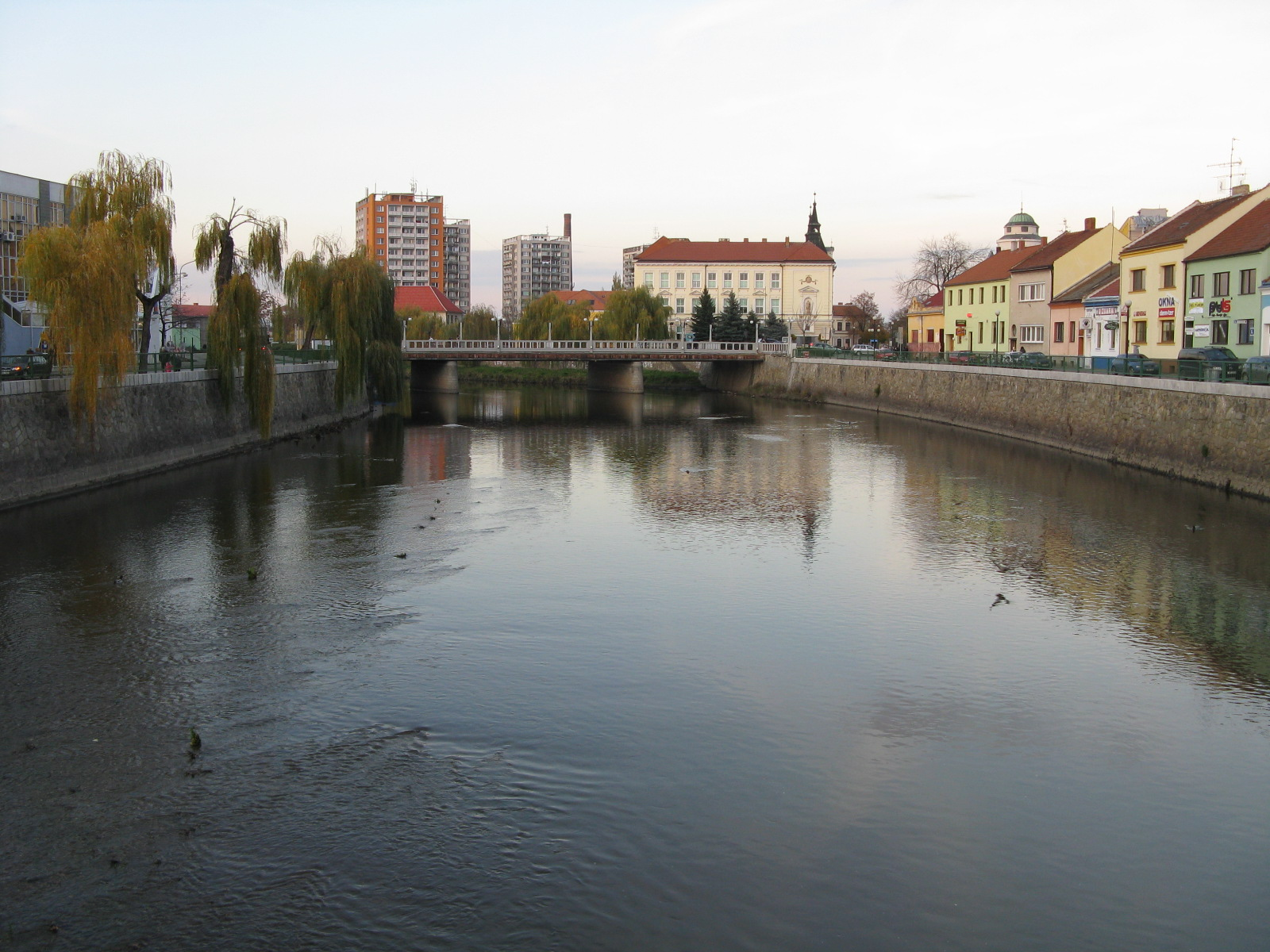
- The Thaya in Břeclav

Location
- Countries: Czech Republic; Austria
- Regions/ States: South Moravian; Lower Austria

Physical characteristics
- Source: German Thaya
  - location: Schweiggers
  - coordinates: 48°39′33″N 15°2′22″E
  - elevation: 658 m (2,159 ft)
- Mouth
  - location: Morava
  - coordinates: 48°37′0″N 16°56′26″E
  - elevation: 151 m (495 ft)
- Length: 311 km (193 mi)
- Basin size: 13,419 km^{2} (5,181 sq mi)
- Discharge
  - average: 43.9 m^{3}/s (1,550 cu ft/s) near the estuary

Basin features
- Progression: Morava→ Danube→ Black Sea

The Thaya (Czech: Dyje, [ˈdɪjɛ]) is a river in the Czech Republic and Austria, a right tributary of the Morava River. It flows through the South Moravian Region in the Czech Republic and through Lower Austria in Austria. It is formed by the confluence of the German Thaya and Moravian Thaya rivers. Together with the German Thaya, which is its main source, the Thaya is 311 km (193 mi) long. Without the German Thaya, it is 235.4 km (146.3 mi) long. In the Czech Republic, the Thaya is the seventh longest river in the country with a length of 196.2 km (121.9 mi).

== Etymology ==
Both the names Thaya and Dyje have their origin in the Illyrian word 'duja', which can be translated as 'rushing river'. The first written mention of Thaya is from 985, when the name was written as Taja.

== Characteristic ==
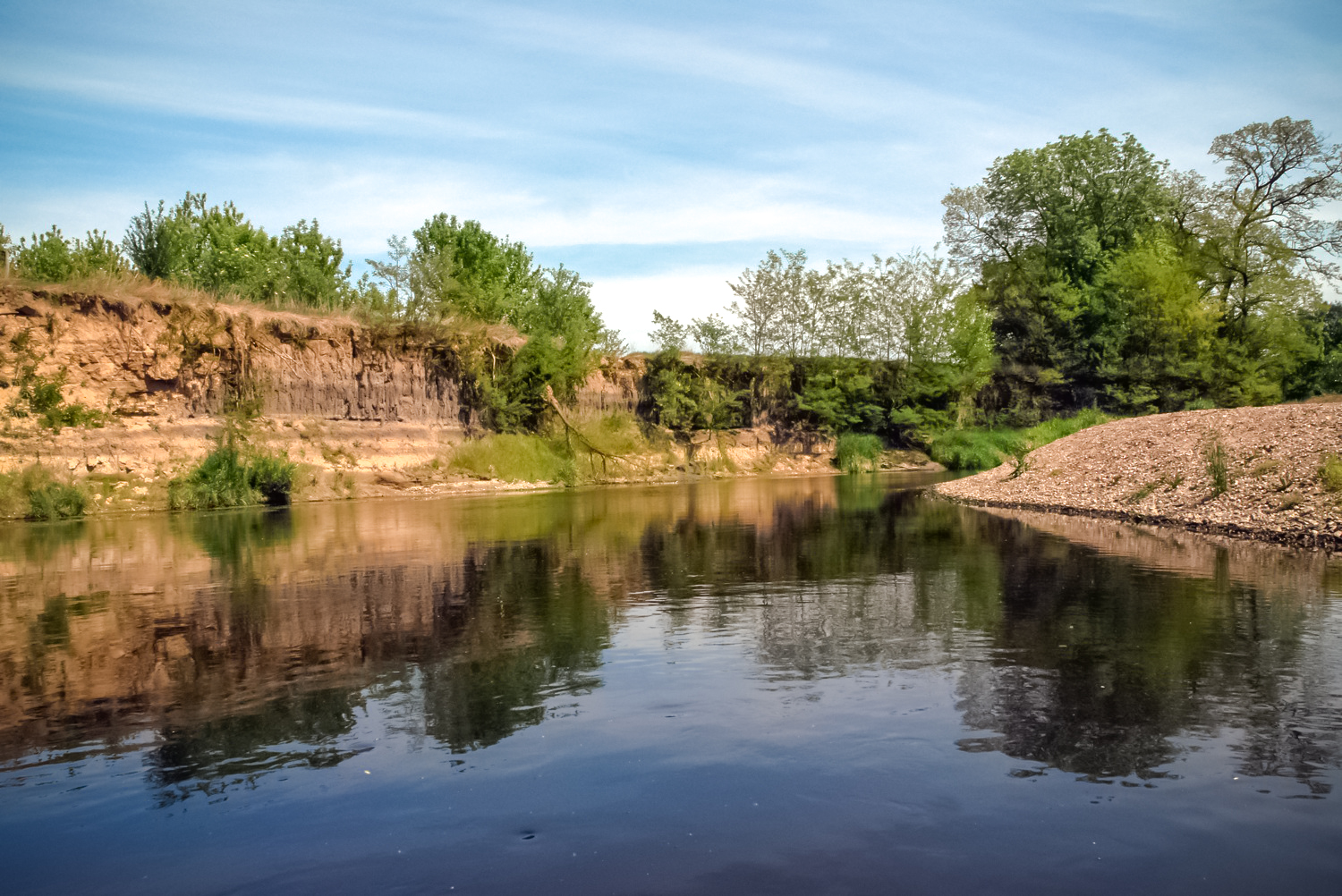
The Thaya in Podyjí National Park

From a water management point of view, the Thaya and German Thaya are two different rivers with separate numbering of river kilometres. From a broader point of view, the Thaya (as German Thaya) originates in the territory of Schweiggers at an elevation of 658 m (2,159 ft) and flows to Lanžhot, where it enters the Morava River at an elevation of 151 m (495 ft). The confluence of the Thaya and Morava is the southernmost and the lowest point of Moravia.

The Thaya is 311 km (193 mi) long, of which 196.2 km (121.9 mi) (including the Austrian–Czech state border) is in the Czech Republic, making it the seventh longest river in the country. Its drainage basin has an area of 13,419 km^{2} (5,181 sq mi), of which 11,160.8 km^{2} (4,309.2 sq mi) is in the Czech Republic. The name Thaya is used from the confluence of the German Thaya with the Moravian Thaya in Raabs an der Thaya and from this point to the confluence with the Morava, the river is 235.4 km (146.3 mi) long.

The Thaya has 573 tributaries. The sources and longest tributaries of the Thaya are:

Tributary	Length (km)	River km	Side
Svratka	168.5	66.0	left
Kyjovka	88.1	8.0	left
Jevišovka	81.7	83.1	left
German Thaya	75.8	235.1	–
Moravian Thaya	68.2	235.1	left
Pulkau	61.0	97.5	right
Želetavka	55.8	190.7	left
Trkmanka	41.7	34.5	left
Štinkovka	14.3	46.5	left
Gránický potok	13.5	132.5	left

Notable indirect right tributaries are the streams Včelínek (length: 27.2 km) and Daníž (length: 25.5 km), which flow to the artificial canals of the Thaya.

== Course ==
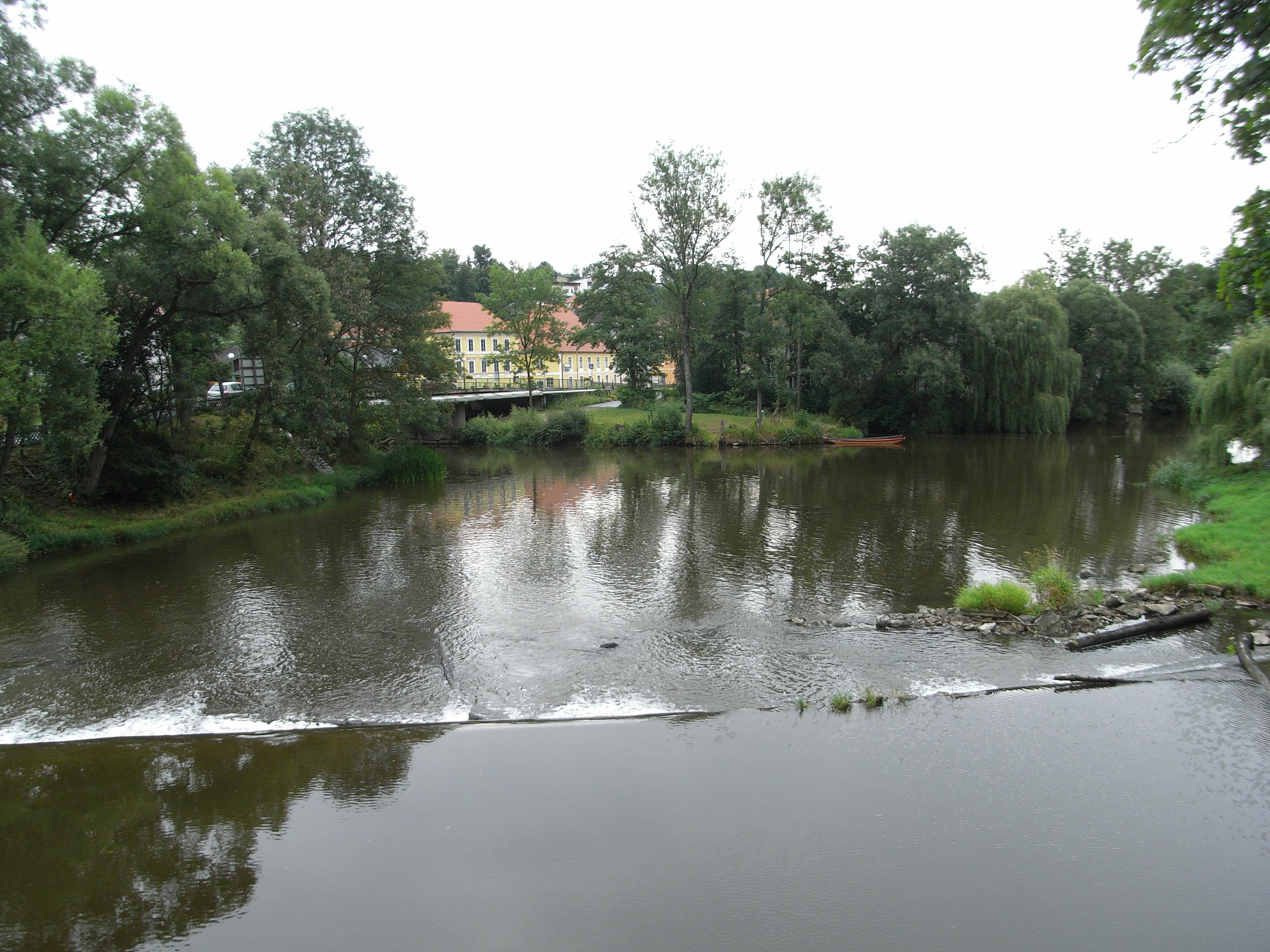
Confluence of the German Thaya (right) and Moravian Thaya

The most populated settlements on the river are the towns of Znojmo and Břeclav. The river flows through or along the following municipalities: Raabs an der Thaya, Ludweis-Aigen, Japons, Drosendorf-Zissersdorf, Vratěnín, Stálky, Uherčice, Podhradí nad Dyjí, Oslnovice, Starý Petřín, Bítov, Chvalatice, Lančov, Vranov nad Dyjí, Horní Břečkov, Hardegg, Lukov, Podmolí, Havraníky, Znojmo, Dobšice, Dyje, Tasovice, Krhovice, Strachotice, Slup, Valtrovice, Křídlůvky, Jaroslavice, Hrádek, Dyjákovice, Laa an der Thaya, Hevlín, Hrabětice, Hrušovany nad Jevišovkou, Wildendürnbach, Jevišovka, Drnholec, Brod nad Dyjí, Dolní Dunajovice, Pasohlávky, Dolní Věstonice, Pavlov, Milovice, Přítluky, Bulhary, Lednice, Podivín, Ladná, Břeclav, Bernhardsthal, Rabensburg, Hohenau an der March and Lanžhot.

== Bodies of water ==
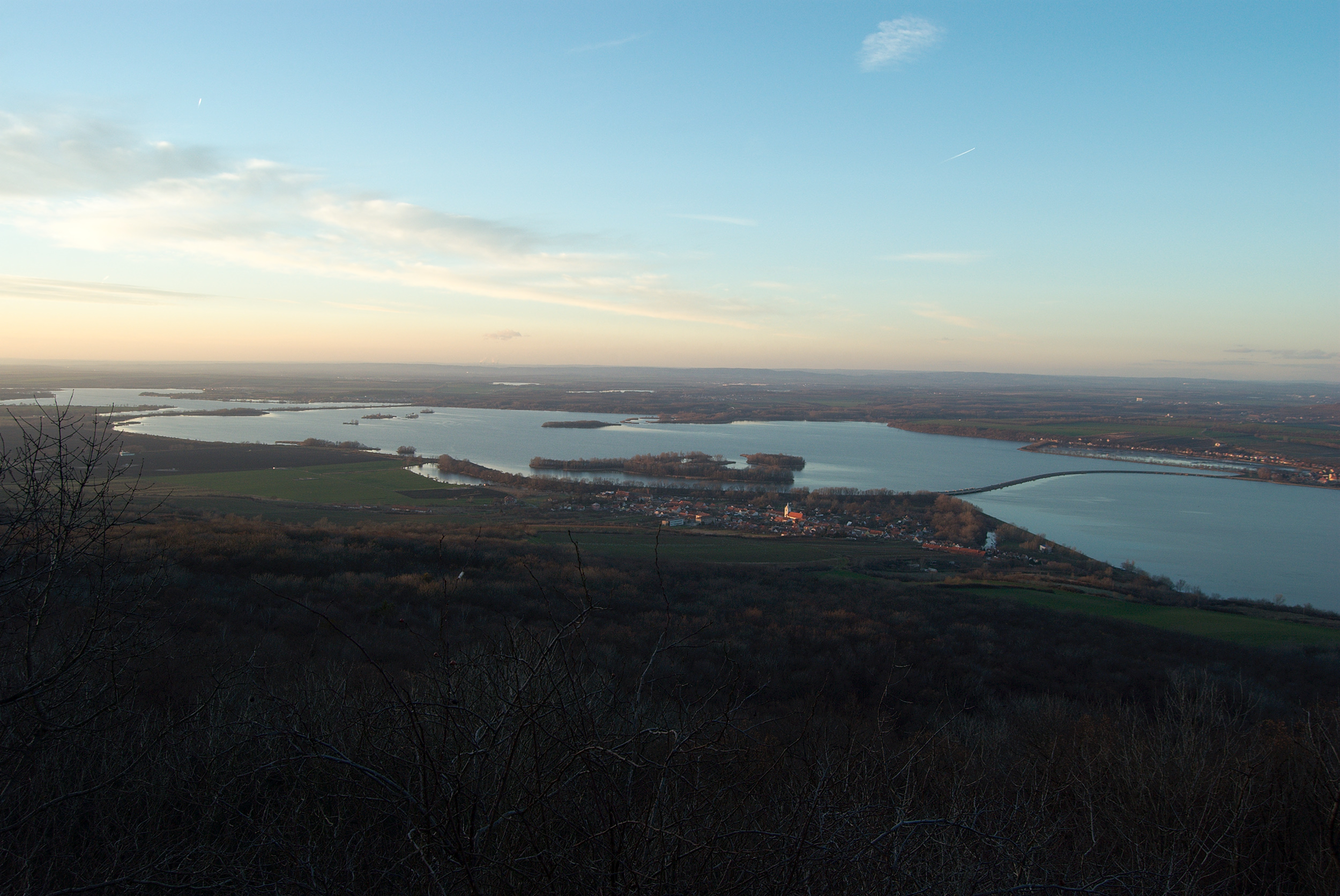
Nové Mlýny reservoirs

There are 7,225 bodies of water in the basin area within the Czech Republic. The largest of them are the three Nové Mlýny reservoirs, built directly on the Thaya. Other reservoirs built on the river are the Znojmo and Vranov reservoirs.

== Nature ==
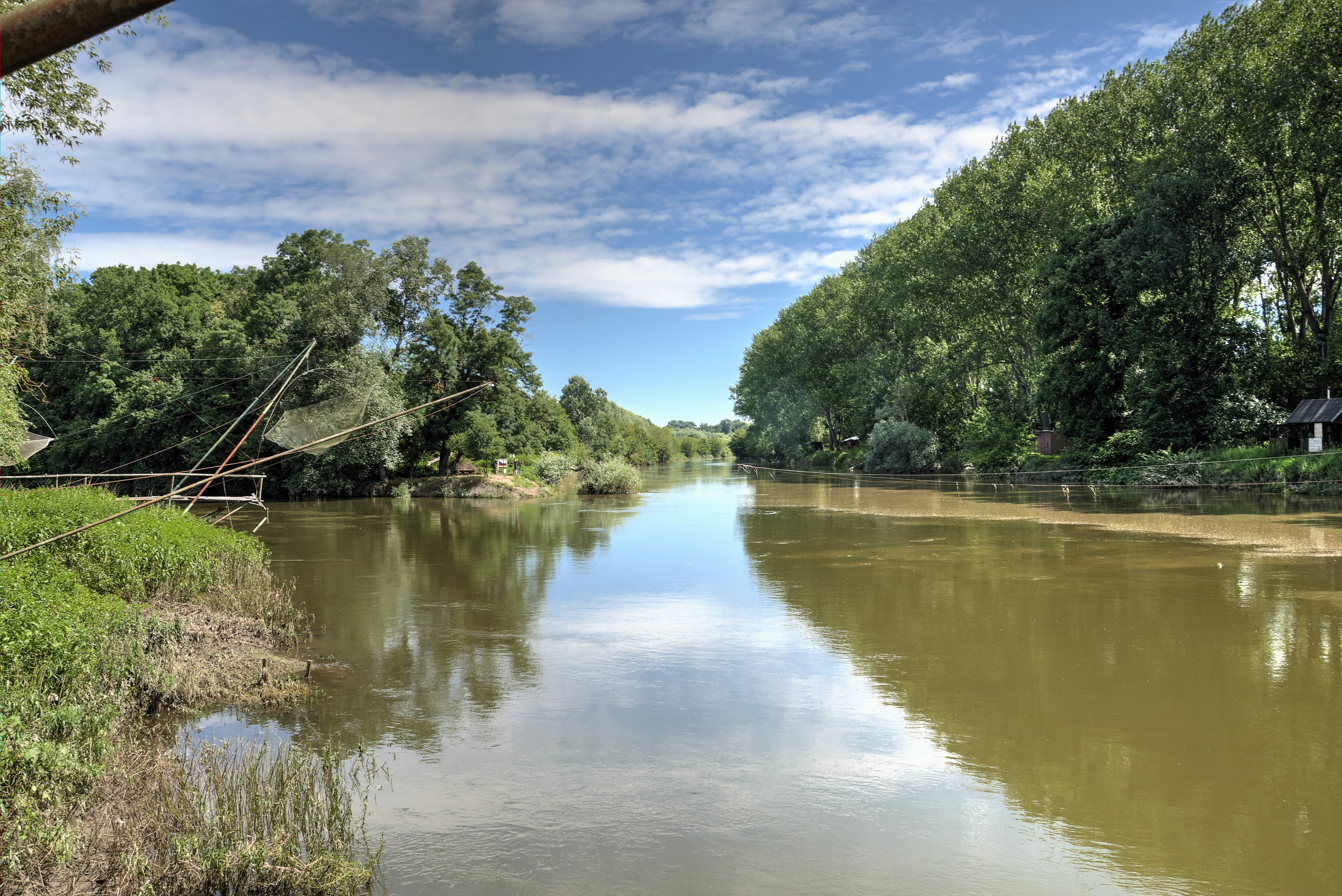
Confluence of the Thaya (left) and Morava

The river flows through the Podyjí and Thayatal national parks. Among the protected species that live in the river are the European crayfish and brown trout. The river is also a nesting place for the common kingfisher.

The area of the confluence of the Morava and Thaya, which also includes many pools, oxbow lakes and channels, is the most valuable ichthyological site in the country. About 80% of native Czech fish species can be found there, and 15% of them are endemic, living only there. Since 2024, the area of the confluence has been protected as a protected landscape area called Soutok.

== Tourism ==
The Thaya is suitable for river tourism. About 209 km (130 mi) of the river is navigable, including almost the entire flow in the Czech Republic. The river has enough water throughout the year and belongs to the rivers suitable for less experienced paddlers. The river flows through the tourist-attractive areas of the Podyjí and Thayatal national parks, and through the Lednice–Valtice Cultural Landscape, which is included on the UNESCO World Heritage List.
