= Lukov (Znojmo District) =

- Market town
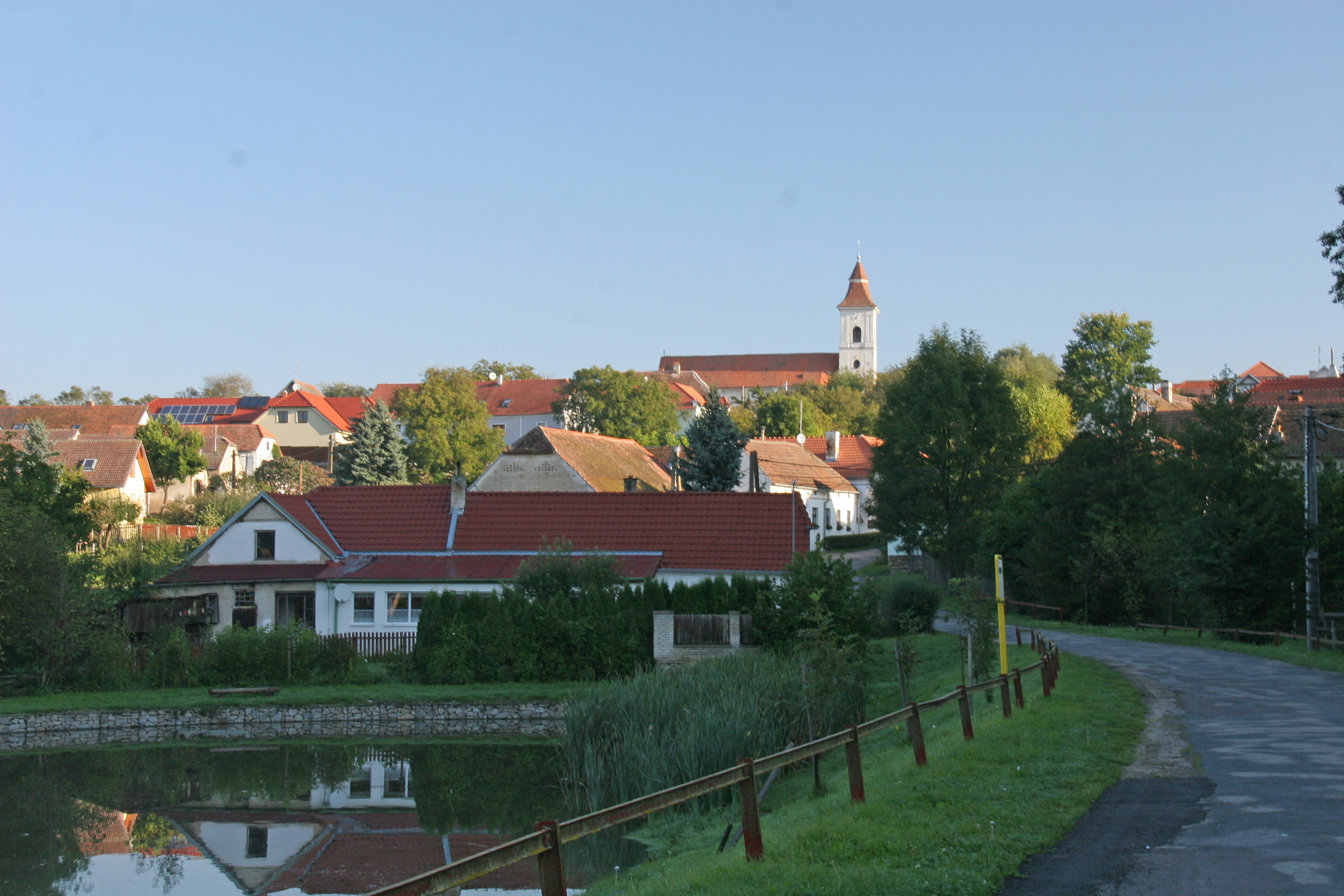
- View from the south

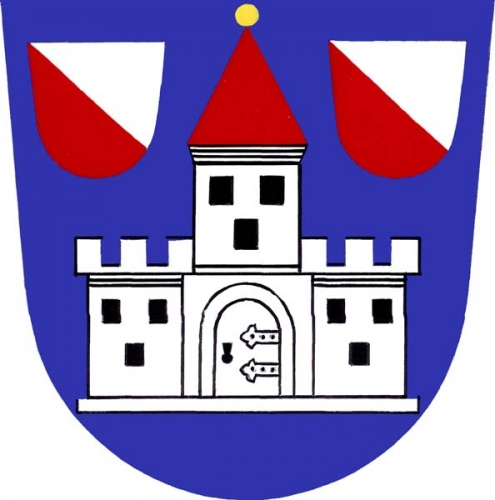
- Flag Coat of arms

- Location in the Czech Republic
- Coordinates: 48°51′42″N 15°54′38″E
- Country: Czech Republic
- Region: South Moravian
- District: Znojmo
- First mentioned: 1235

Area
  - Total: 14.28 km^{2} (5.51 sq mi)
- Elevation: 415 m (1,362 ft)

Population (2026-01-01)
  - Total: 256
  - Density: 17.9/km^{2} (46.4/sq mi)
- Time zone: UTC+1 (CET)
  - Summer (DST): UTC+2 (CEST)
- Postal code: 669 02
- Website: www.mestys-lukov.cz

Lukov (Czech pronunciation: [ˈlukof]; German: Luggau) is a market town in Znojmo District in the South Moravian Region of the Czech Republic. It has about 300 inhabitants.

== Geography ==
Lukov is located about 9 kilometres (6 mi) west of Znojmo and 61 km (38 mi) southwest of Brno, on the border with Austria. It lies in the Jevišovice Uplands. The highest point is at 441 m (1,447 ft) above sea level. The Czech–Austrian border is formed here by the Thaya river. The Podyjí National Park occupies the western part of the municipal territory.

== History ==
The first written mention of Lukov is in a document from 1284 concerning the patronage of the Louka Monastery over the parish of Lukov (the parish was already documented in 1235). In 1358, the monastery sold Lukov to Moravian Margrave John Henry. He had built a castle called Nový Hrádek near Lukov.

In the following centuries, the owners of Lukov often changed. The most important owners include the Krajíř of Krajek family, during whose rule in 1548 the village was promoted to a market town. During the rule of the Dietrichstein family, which bought Lukov in 1568, the estate was merged with the Vranov estate and the importance of Nový Hrádek and Lukov decreased.

== Demographics ==
Historical population

Year	Pop.	±%
1869	444	—
1880	433	−2.5%
1890	493	+13.9%
1900	472	−4.3%
1910	433	−8.3%

Year	Pop.	±%
1921	479	+10.6%
1930	445	−7.1%
1950	313	−29.7%
1961	310	−1.0%
1970	252	−18.7%

Year	Pop.	±%
1980	253	+0.4%
1991	200	−20.9%
2001	218	+9.0%
2011	260	+19.3%
2021	254	−2.3%

Source: Censuses

== Transport ==
There are no railways or major roads passing through the municipality.

== Sights ==
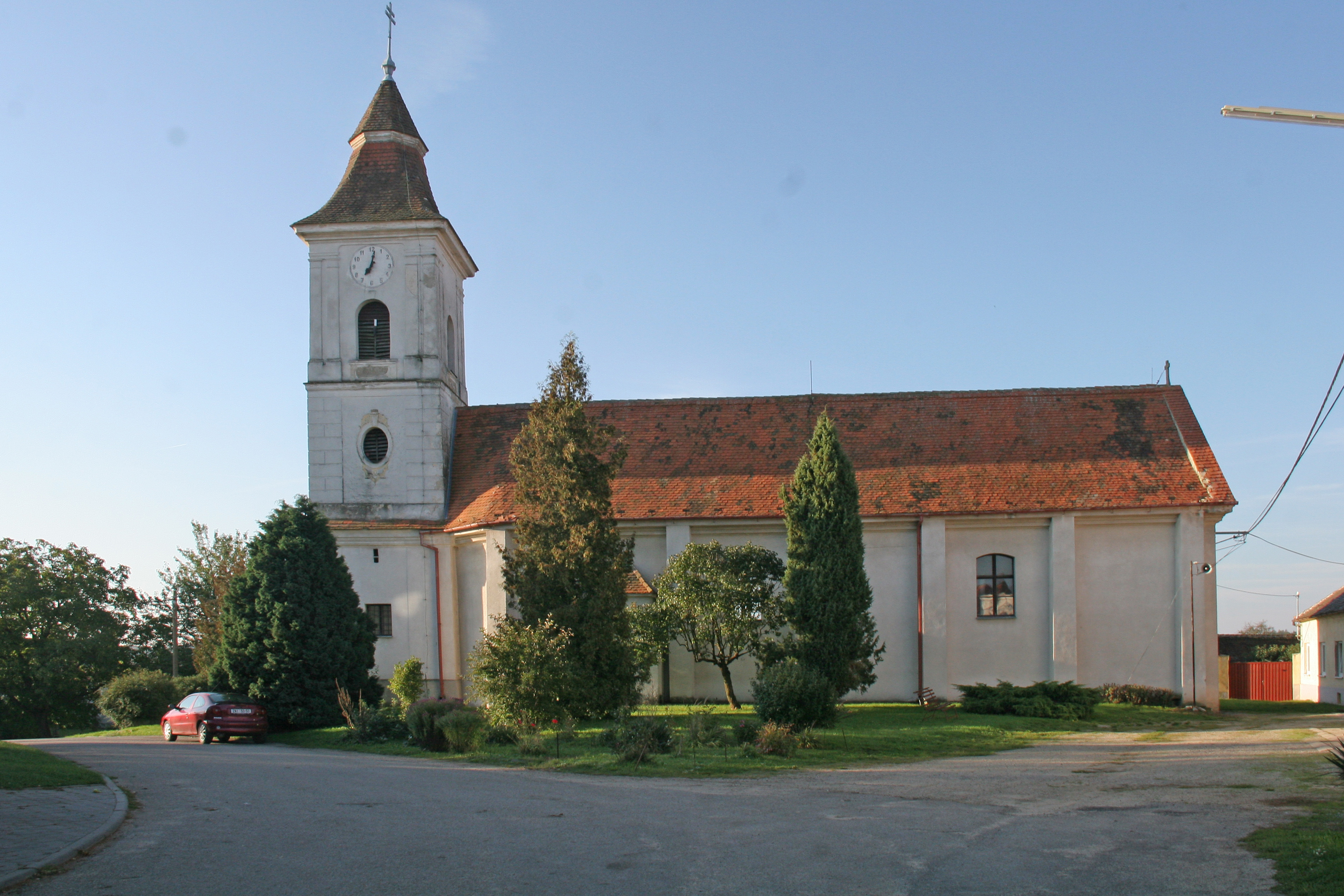
Church of Saint Giles

The main landmark of Lukov is the Church of Saint Giles. It was built in the late Baroque style in 1749, but the core of the church with the presbytery is preserved from the previous Gothic church.

Nový Hrádek Castle was devastated by the Swedish army in 1645, during the Thirty Years' War. It was then abandoned and never restored. Due to its location in the border zone and in the national park, the torzo of the castle has been well preserved. It is a pure example of a castle with a mantlet wall.
