= Dyjákovice =

- Market town
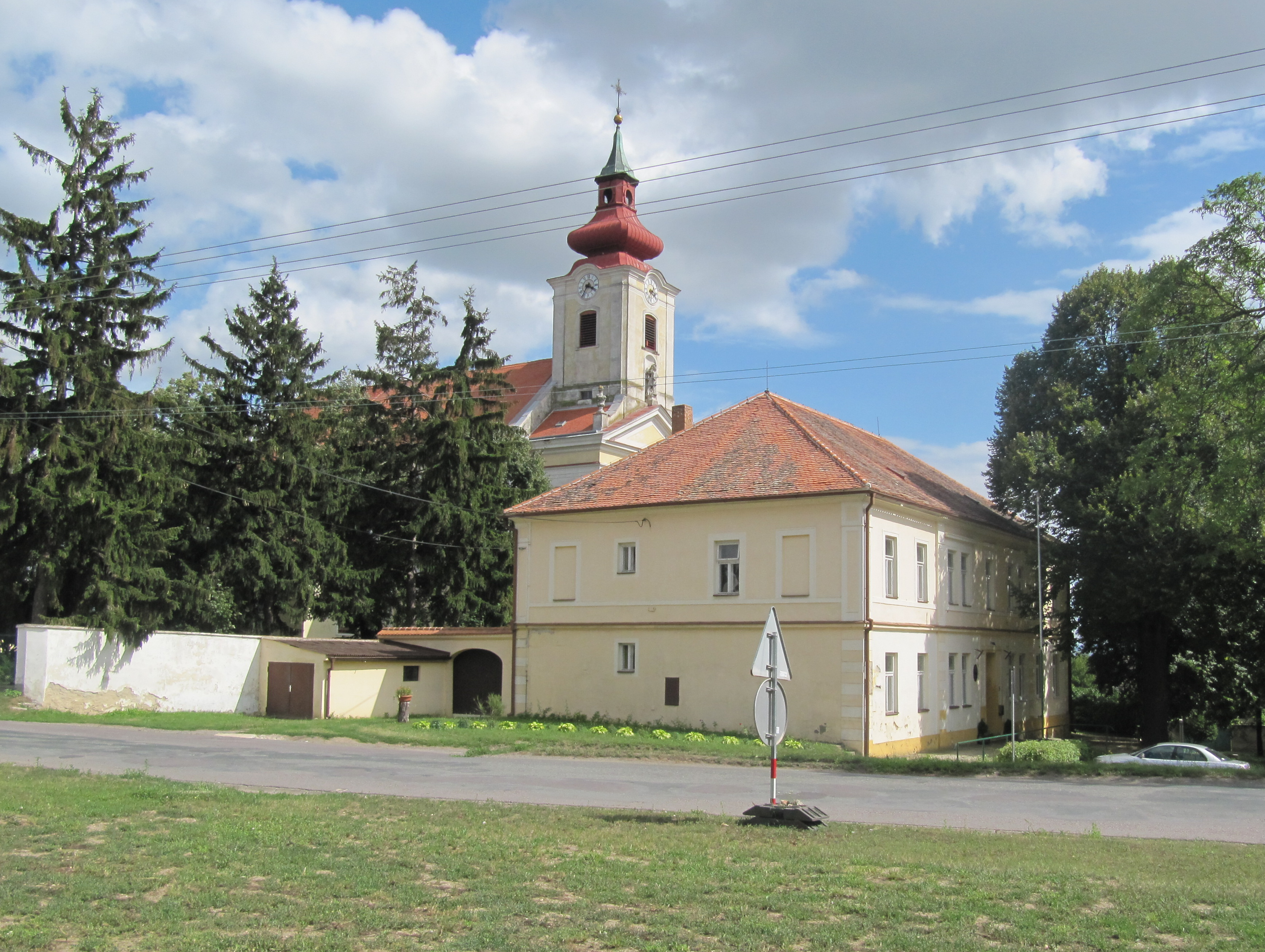
- Municipal office

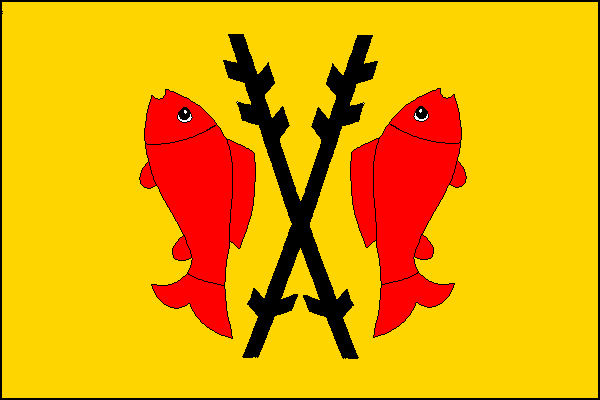
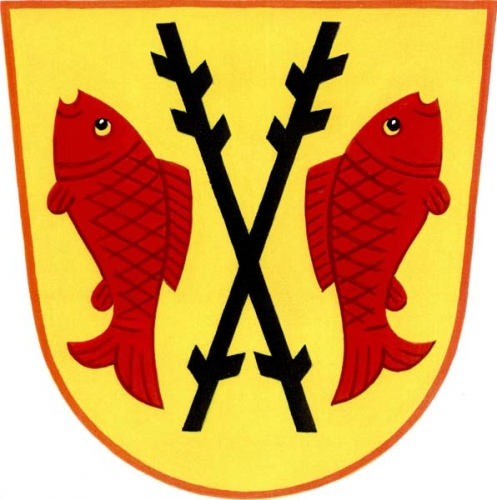
- Flag Coat of arms

- Location in the Czech Republic
- Coordinates: 48°46′19″N 16°18′3″E
- Country: Czech Republic
- Region: South Moravian
- District: Znojmo
- First mentioned: 1278

Area
  - Total: 19.30 km^{2} (7.45 sq mi)
- Elevation: 185 m (607 ft)

Population (2026-01-01)
  - Total: 932
  - Density: 48.3/km^{2} (125/sq mi)
- Time zone: UTC+1 (CET)
  - Summer (DST): UTC+2 (CEST)
- Postal code: 671 26
- Website: www.dyjakovice.cz

Dyjákovice (Czech pronunciation: [ˈdɪjaːkovɪtsɛ]; German: Groß Tajax) is a market town in Znojmo District in the South Moravian Region of the Czech Republic. It has about 900 inhabitants.

== Geography ==
Dyjákovice is located about 20 kilometres (12 mi) southeast of Znojmo and 50 km (31 mi) southwest of Brno, on the border with Austria. It lies in a flat agricultural landscape in the Dyje–Svratka Valley. The Thaya River flows through the southern part of the municipal territory.

== History ==
The first written mention of Dyjákovice is from 1278, when King Rudolf I's army camped here. The village was church property until at least 1320, but during the 14th century it became the property of Lords of Bítov, who sold it to Drslav of Šelnberk in 1390. After some time, Lords of Boskovice became the owners, who in 1489 sold Dyjákovice to the Pernštejn family.

In the 16th century, Dyjákovice was inherited by the Lords of Lipá. However, their properties were confiscated after the Battle of White Mountain in 1620 and Dyjákovice was acquired by the Liechtenstein family. They annexed it to the Moravský Krumlov estate. In 1882, Dyjákovice was promoted to a market town. After the title was revoked after World War II, it was returned to the municipality in 2024.

== Demographics ==
Historical population

Year	Pop.	±%
1869	2,423	—
1880	2,545	+5.0%
1890	2,611	+2.6%
1900	2,758	+5.6%
1910	2,901	+5.2%

Year	Pop.	±%
1921	3,007	+3.7%
1930	3,257	+8.3%
1950	1,241	−61.9%
1961	1,102	−11.2%
1970	1,067	−3.2%

Year	Pop.	±%
1980	916	−14.2%
1991	816	−10.9%
2001	843	+3.3%
2011	814	−3.4%
2021	848	+4.2%

Source: Censuses

== Economy ==
Dyjákovice is known for viticulture. It lies in the Znojemská wine subregion.

== Transport ==
There are no railways or major roads passing through the municipality.

== Sights ==
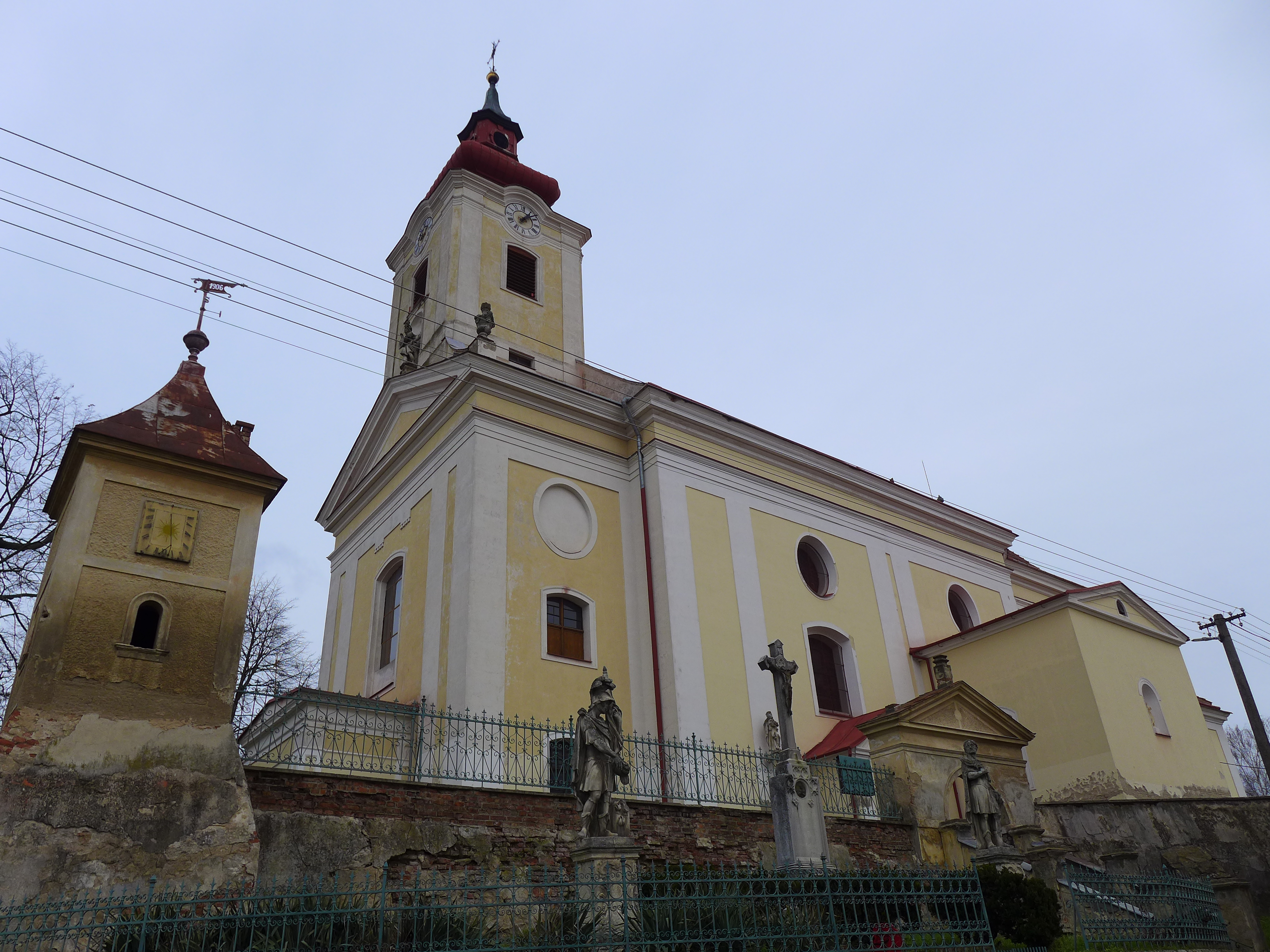
Church of Saint Michael the Archangel

The main landmark of Dyjákovice is the Church of Saint Michael the Archangel. It was built in the late Baroque style in 1757–1761, on the site of a demolished church from the 13th century. In 1873, the church was expanded by side chapels.
