= Křídlůvky =

- Municipality
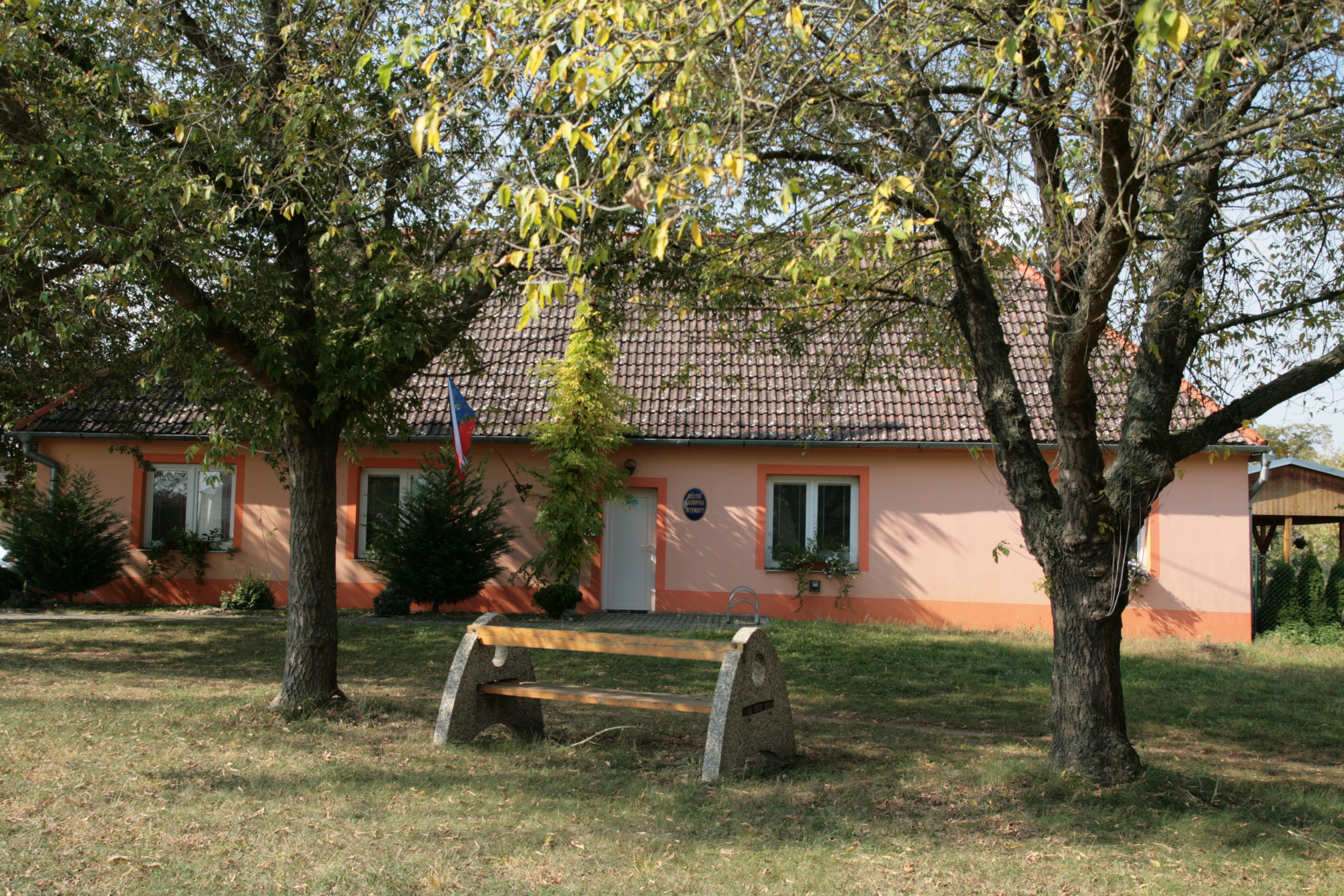
- Municipal office

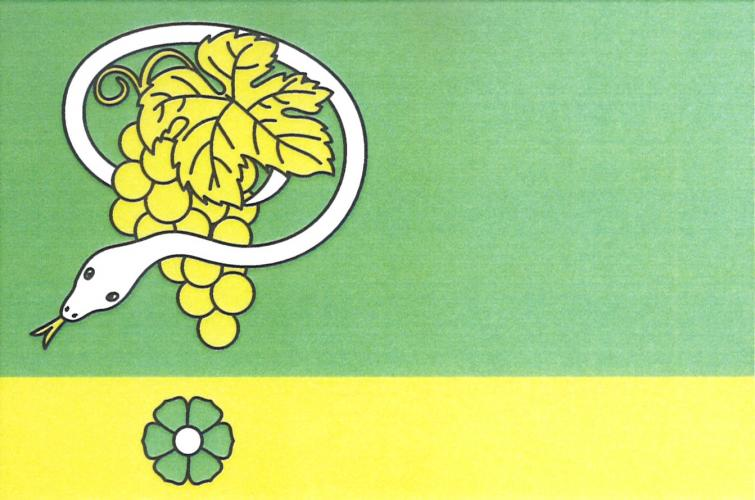
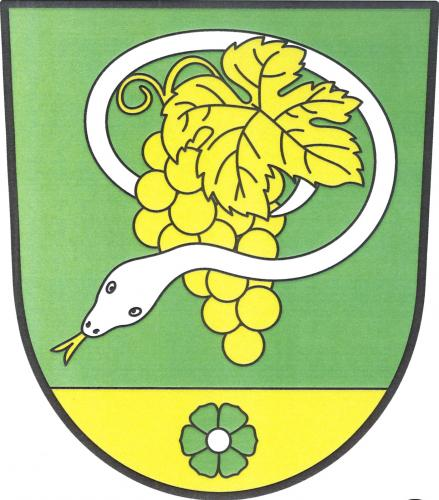
- Flag Coat of arms

- Location in the Czech Republic
- Coordinates: 48°46′55″N 16°14′14″E
- Country: Czech Republic
- Region: South Moravian
- District: Znojmo
- First mentioned: 1255

Area
  - Total: 7.87 km^{2} (3.04 sq mi)
- Elevation: 190 m (620 ft)

Population (2026-01-01)
  - Total: 249
  - Density: 31.6/km^{2} (81.9/sq mi)
- Time zone: UTC+1 (CET)
  - Summer (DST): UTC+2 (CEST)
- Postal code: 671 28
- Website: www.kridluvky.cz

Křídlůvky (German: Klein Grillowitz) is a municipality and village in Znojmo District in the South Moravian Region of the Czech Republic. It has about 200 inhabitants.

Křídlůvky lies approximately 17 kilometres (11 mi) east of Znojmo, 53 km (33 mi) south-west of Brno, and 195 km (121 mi) south-east of Prague.

== Demographics ==
Historical population
Year	Pop.	±%
1869	477	—
1880	481	+0.8%
1890	522	+8.5%
1900	563	+7.9%
1910	569	+1.1%
1921	584	+2.6%
1930	626	+7.2%
1950	359	−42.7%
1961	378	+5.3%
1970	346	−8.5%
1980	283	−18.2%
1991	207	−26.9%
2001	214	+3.4%
2011	222	+3.7%
2021	242	+9.0%
Source: Censuses
