= Stálky =

- Municipality
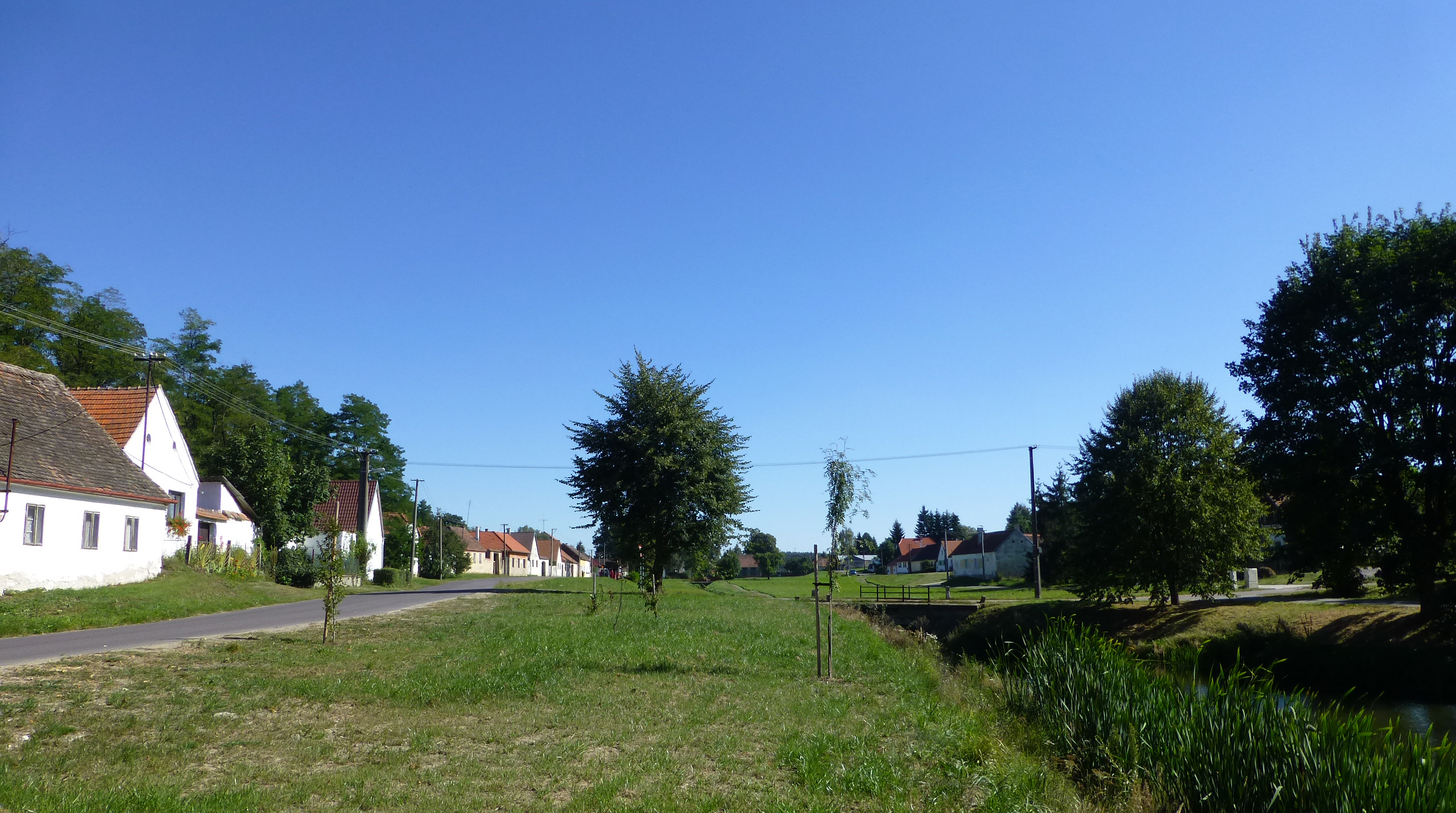
- Centre of Stálky

- Flag Coat of arms

- Location in the Czech Republic
- Coordinates: 48°52′13″N 15°41′5″E
- Country: Czech Republic
- Region: South Moravian
- District: Znojmo
- First mentioned: 1312

Area
  - Total: 12.08 km^{2} (4.66 sq mi)
- Elevation: 435 m (1,427 ft)

Population (2026-01-01)
  - Total: 117
  - Density: 9.69/km^{2} (25.1/sq mi)
- Time zone: UTC+1 (CET)
  - Summer (DST): UTC+2 (CEST)
- Postal code: 671 06
- Website: www.obecstalky.cz

Stálky is a municipality and village in Znojmo District in the South Moravian Region of the Czech Republic. It has about 100 inhabitants.

Stálky lies approximately 26 kilometres (16 mi) west of Znojmo, 77 km (48 mi) south-west of Brno, and 163 km (101 mi) south-east of Prague.

== Demographics ==
Historical population
| Year | Pop. | ±% |
|---|---|---|
| 1869 | 523 | — |
| 1880 | 542 | +3.6% |
| 1890 | 494 | −8.9% |
| 1900 | 476 | −3.6% |
| 1910 | 491 | +3.2% |
| 1921 | 493 | +0.4% |
| 1930 | 463 | −6.1% |
| 1950 | 310 | −33.0% |
| 1961 | 226 | −27.1% |
| 1970 | 199 | −11.9% |
| 1980 | 190 | −4.5% |
| 1991 | 144 | −24.2% |
| 2001 | 146 | +1.4% |
| 2011 | 129 | −11.6% |
| 2021 | 108 | −16.3% |
Source: Censuses
