= Havraníky =

- Municipality
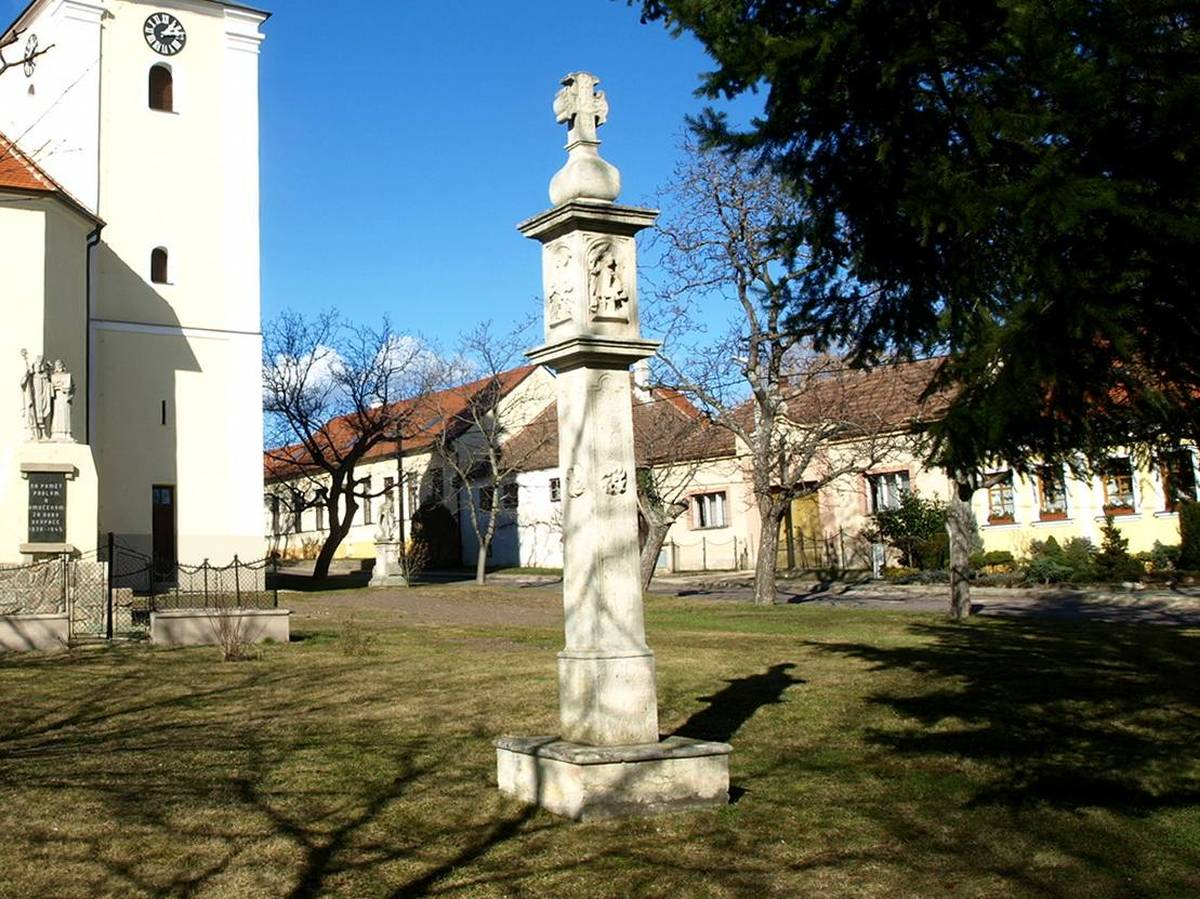
- Calvary in front of Church of Saint Leonard

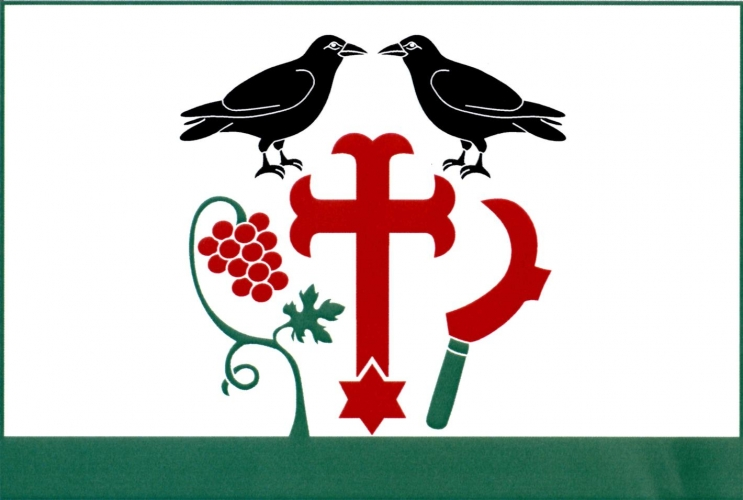
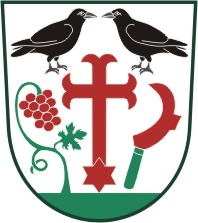
- Flag Coat of arms

- Location in the Czech Republic
- Coordinates: 48°48′41″N 16°0′30″E
- Country: Czech Republic
- Region: South Moravian
- District: Znojmo
- First mentioned: 1269

Area
  - Total: 9.20 km^{2} (3.55 sq mi)
- Elevation: 300 m (980 ft)

Population (2026-01-01)
  - Total: 303
  - Density: 32.9/km^{2} (85.3/sq mi)
- Time zone: UTC+1 (CET)
  - Summer (DST): UTC+2 (CEST)
- Postal code: 669 02
- Website: www.havraniky.cz

Havraníky is a municipality and village in Znojmo District in the South Moravian Region of the Czech Republic. It has about 300 inhabitants.

Havraníky lies approximately 5 kilometres (3 mi) south of Znojmo, 62 km (39 mi) south-west of Brno, and 183 km (114 mi) south-east of Prague.

== Demographics ==
Historical population
Year	Pop.	±%
1869	575	—
1880	652	+13.4%
1890	695	+6.6%
1900	711	+2.3%
1910	659	−7.3%
1921	673	+2.1%
1930	621	−7.7%
1950	515	−17.1%
1961	472	−8.3%
1970	405	−14.2%
1980	391	−3.5%
1991	367	−6.1%
2001	344	−6.3%
2011	324	−5.8%
2021	301	−7.1%
Source: Censuses
