= Chvalatice =

- Municipality
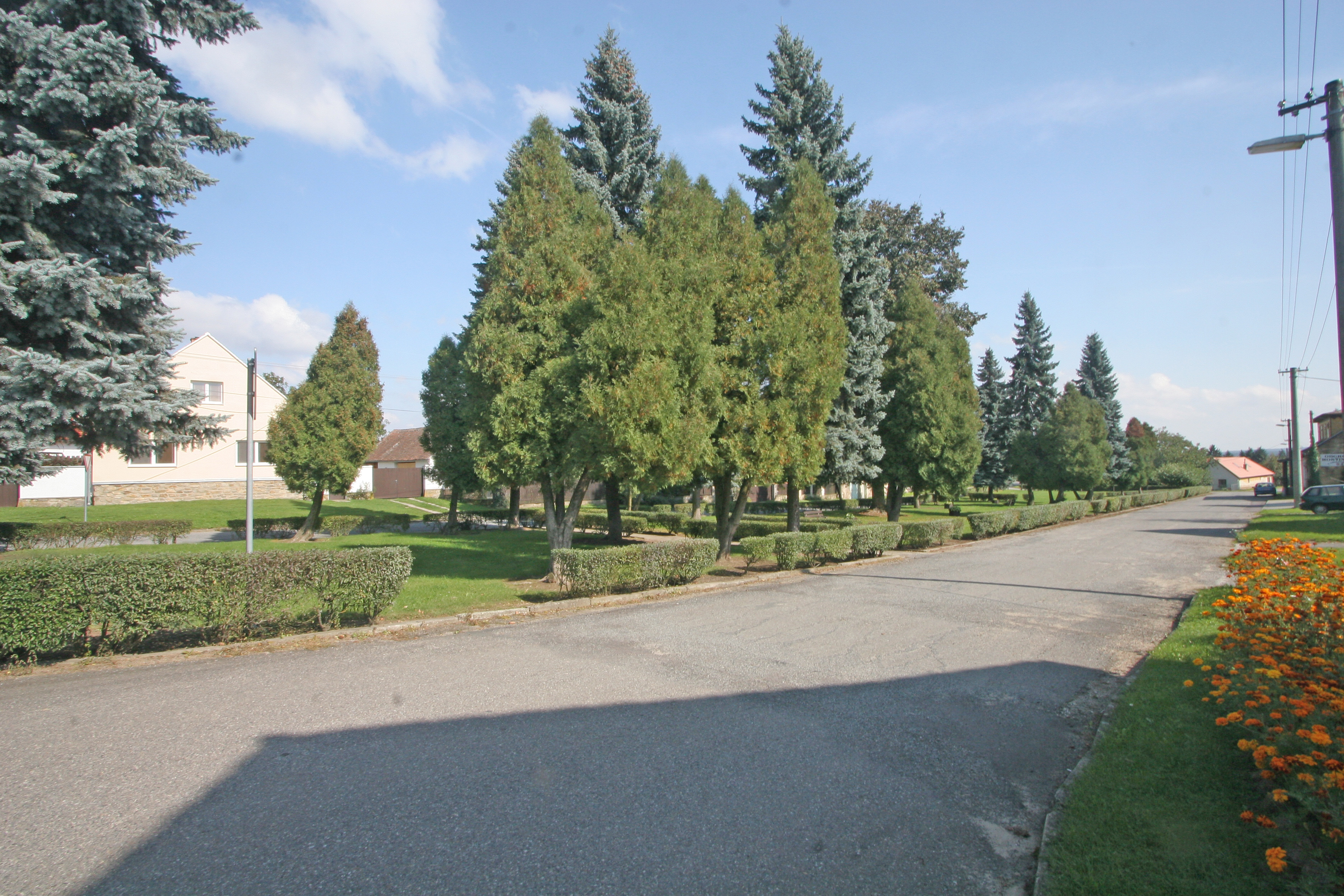
- Centre of Chvalatice

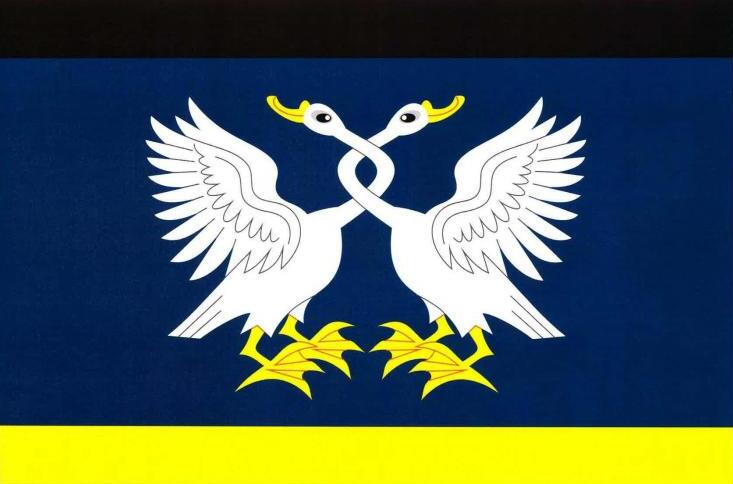
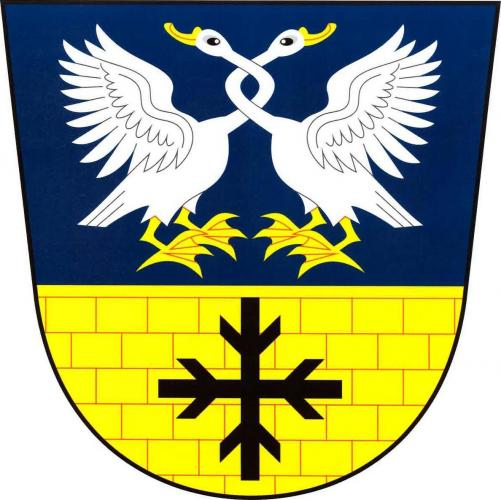
- Flag Coat of arms

- Location in the Czech Republic
- Coordinates: 48°56′52″N 15°45′4″E
- Country: Czech Republic
- Region: South Moravian
- District: Znojmo
- First mentioned: 1498

Area
  - Total: 11.81 km^{2} (4.56 sq mi)
- Elevation: 440 m (1,440 ft)

Population (2026-01-01)
  - Total: 109
  - Density: 9.23/km^{2} (23.9/sq mi)
- Time zone: UTC+1 (CET)
  - Summer (DST): UTC+2 (CEST)
- Postal code: 671 02
- Website: www.obecchvalatice.cz

Chvalatice is a municipality and village in Znojmo District in the South Moravian Region of the Czech Republic. It has about 100 inhabitants.

Chvalatice lies approximately 24 kilometres (15 mi) north-west of Znojmo, 69 km (43 mi) south-west of Brno and 159 km (99 mi) south-east of Prague.

== Demographics ==
Historical population
Year	Pop.	±%
1869	434	—
1880	473	+9.0%
1890	515	+8.9%
1900	412	−20.0%
1910	418	+1.5%
1921	408	−2.4%
1930	382	−6.4%
1950	307	−19.6%
1961	264	−14.0%
1970	241	−8.7%
1980	207	−14.1%
1991	160	−22.7%
2001	130	−18.8%
2011	107	−17.7%
2021	102	−4.7%
Source: Censuses
