= Valtrovice =

- Municipality
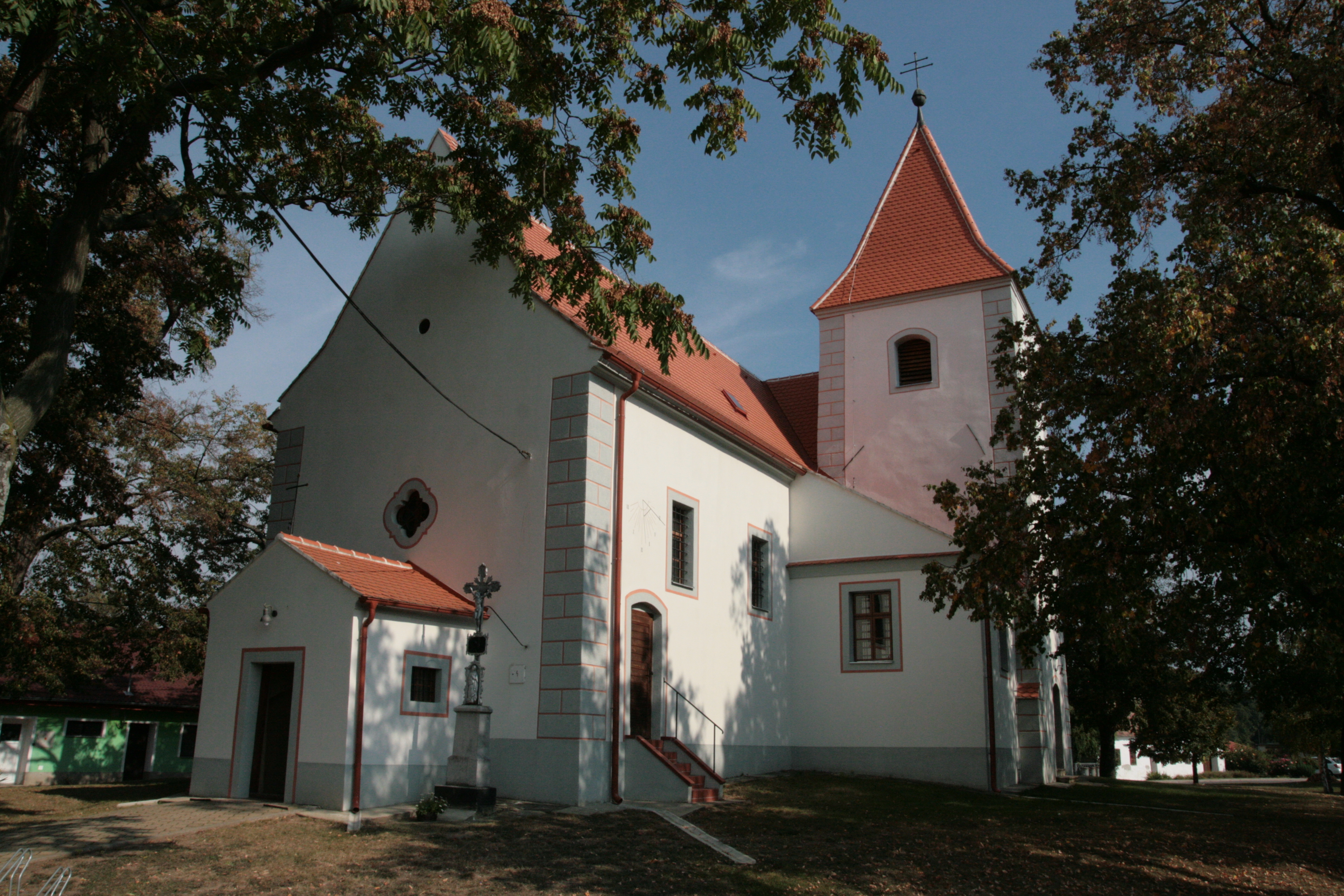
- Church of Saint John the Baptist

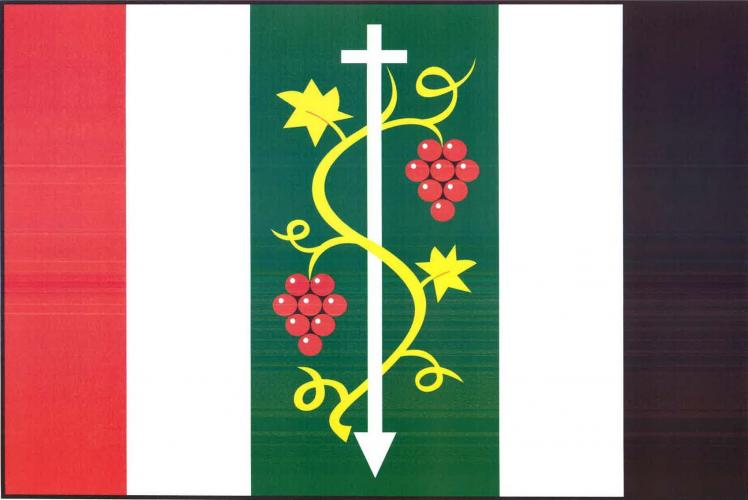
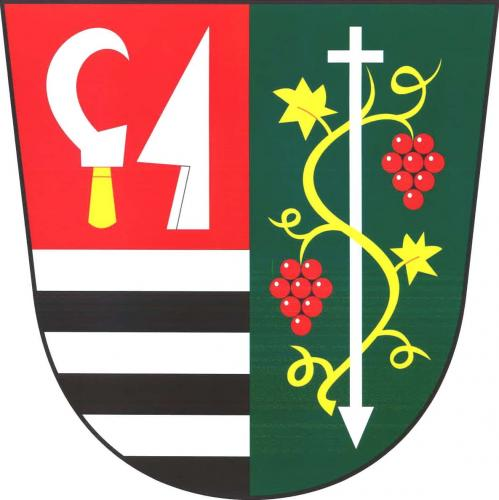
- Flag Coat of arms

- Location in the Czech Republic
- Coordinates: 48°47′38″N 16°13′15″E
- Country: Czech Republic
- Region: South Moravian
- District: Znojmo
- First mentioned: 1307

Area
  - Total: 7.74 km^{2} (2.99 sq mi)
- Elevation: 192 m (630 ft)

Population (2026-01-01)
  - Total: 410
  - Density: 53/km^{2} (140/sq mi)
- Time zone: UTC+1 (CET)
  - Summer (DST): UTC+2 (CEST)
- Postal code: 671 28
- Website: www.valtrovice.cz

Valtrovice (German: Waltrowitz) is a municipality and village in Znojmo District in the South Moravian Region of the Czech Republic. It has about 400 inhabitants.

Valtrovice lies approximately 15 kilometres (9 mi) east of Znojmo, 53 km (33 mi) south-west of Brno, and 193 km (120 mi) south-east of Prague.

== Demographics ==
Historical population
Year	Pop.	±%
1869	520	—
1880	514	−1.2%
1890	569	+10.7%
1900	560	−1.6%
1910	511	−8.8%
1921	557	+9.0%
1930	607	+9.0%
1950	296	−51.2%
1961	301	+1.7%
1970	307	+2.0%
1980	348	+13.4%
1991	323	−7.2%
2001	379	+17.3%
2011	381	+0.5%
2021	385	+1.0%
Source: Censuses
