= Krhovice =

- Municipality
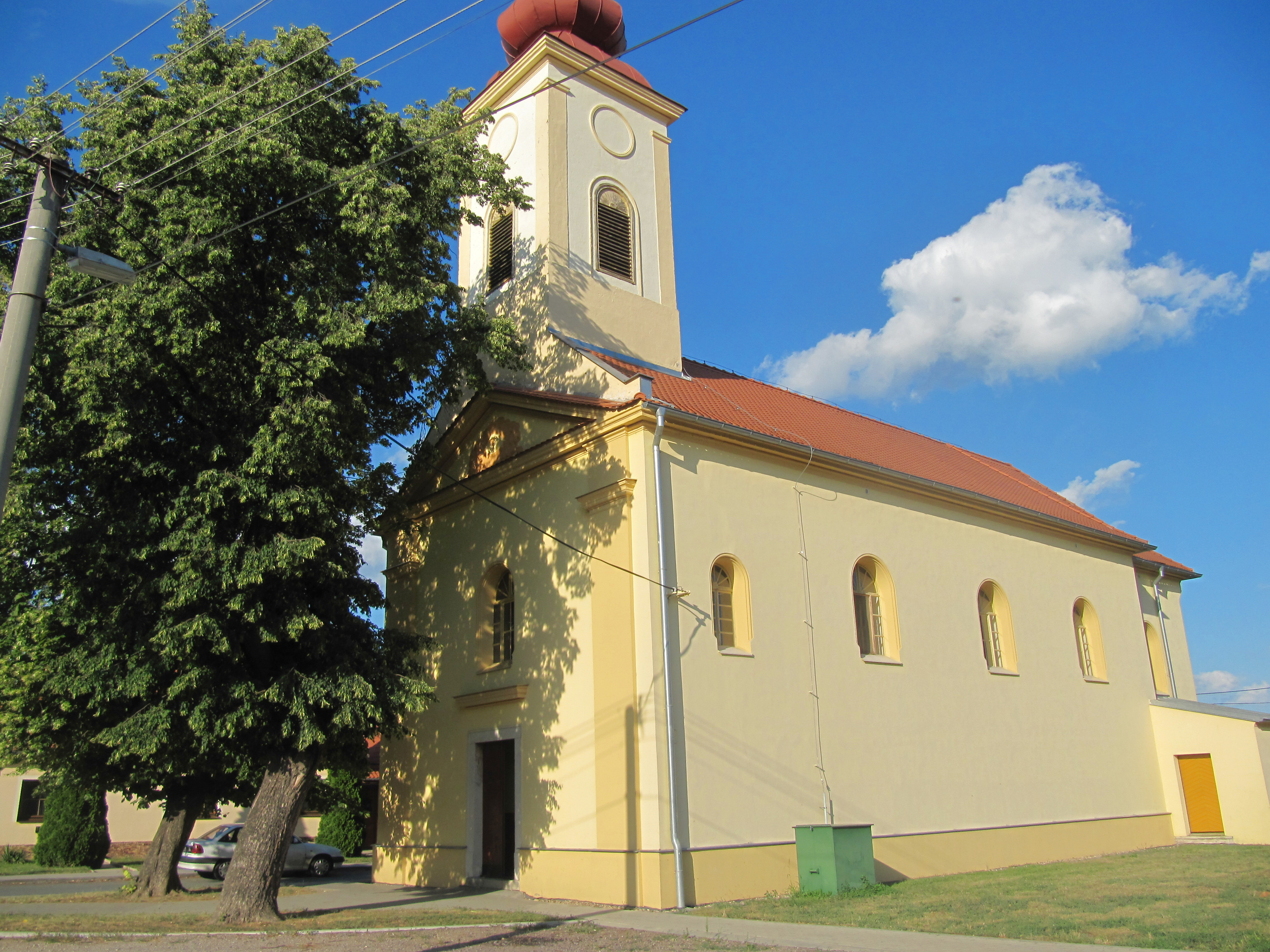
- Church of Saint Bartholomew

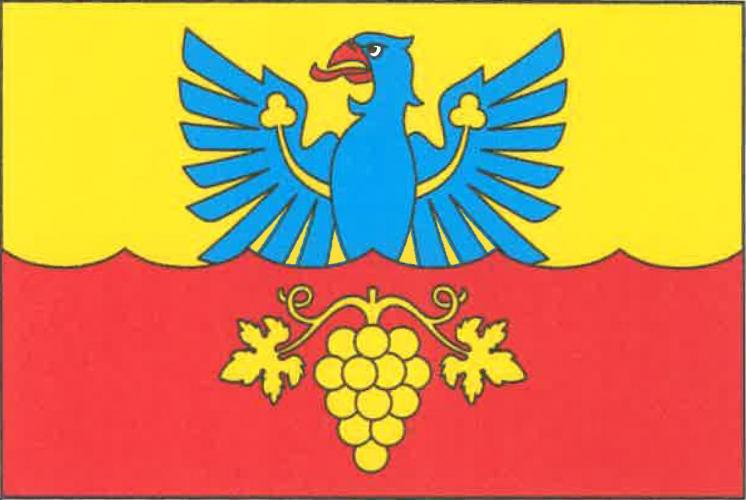
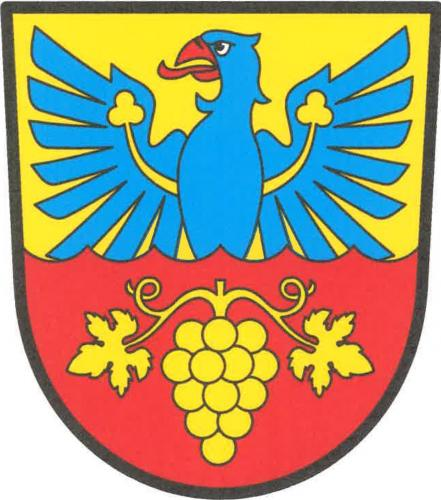
- Flag Coat of arms

- Location in the Czech Republic
- Coordinates: 48°48′57″N 16°10′25″E
- Country: Czech Republic
- Region: South Moravian
- District: Znojmo
- First mentioned: 1294

Area
  - Total: 8.13 km^{2} (3.14 sq mi)
- Elevation: 204 m (669 ft)

Population (2026-01-01)
  - Total: 643
  - Density: 79.1/km^{2} (205/sq mi)
- Time zone: UTC+1 (CET)
  - Summer (DST): UTC+2 (CEST)
- Postal code: 671 28
- Website: www.krhovice.cz

Krhovice is a municipality and village in Znojmo District in the South Moravian Region of the Czech Republic. It has about 600 inhabitants.

Krhovice lies approximately 12 kilometres (7 mi) east of Znojmo, 53 km (33 mi) south-west of Brno, and 190 km (120 mi) south-east of Prague.

== Demographics ==
Historical population
| Year | Pop. | ±% |
|---|---|---|
| 1869 | 607 | — |
| 1880 | 623 | +2.6% |
| 1890 | 654 | +5.0% |
| 1900 | 648 | −0.9% |
| 1910 | 680 | +4.9% |
| 1921 | 757 | +11.3% |
| 1930 | 789 | +4.2% |
| 1950 | 560 | −29.0% |
| 1961 | 554 | −1.1% |
| 1970 | 497 | −10.3% |
| 1980 | 484 | −2.6% |
| 1991 | 475 | −1.9% |
| 2001 | 484 | +1.9% |
| 2011 | 506 | +4.5% |
| 2021 | 581 | +14.8% |
Source: Censuses
