= Dyje (Znojmo District) =

- Municipality
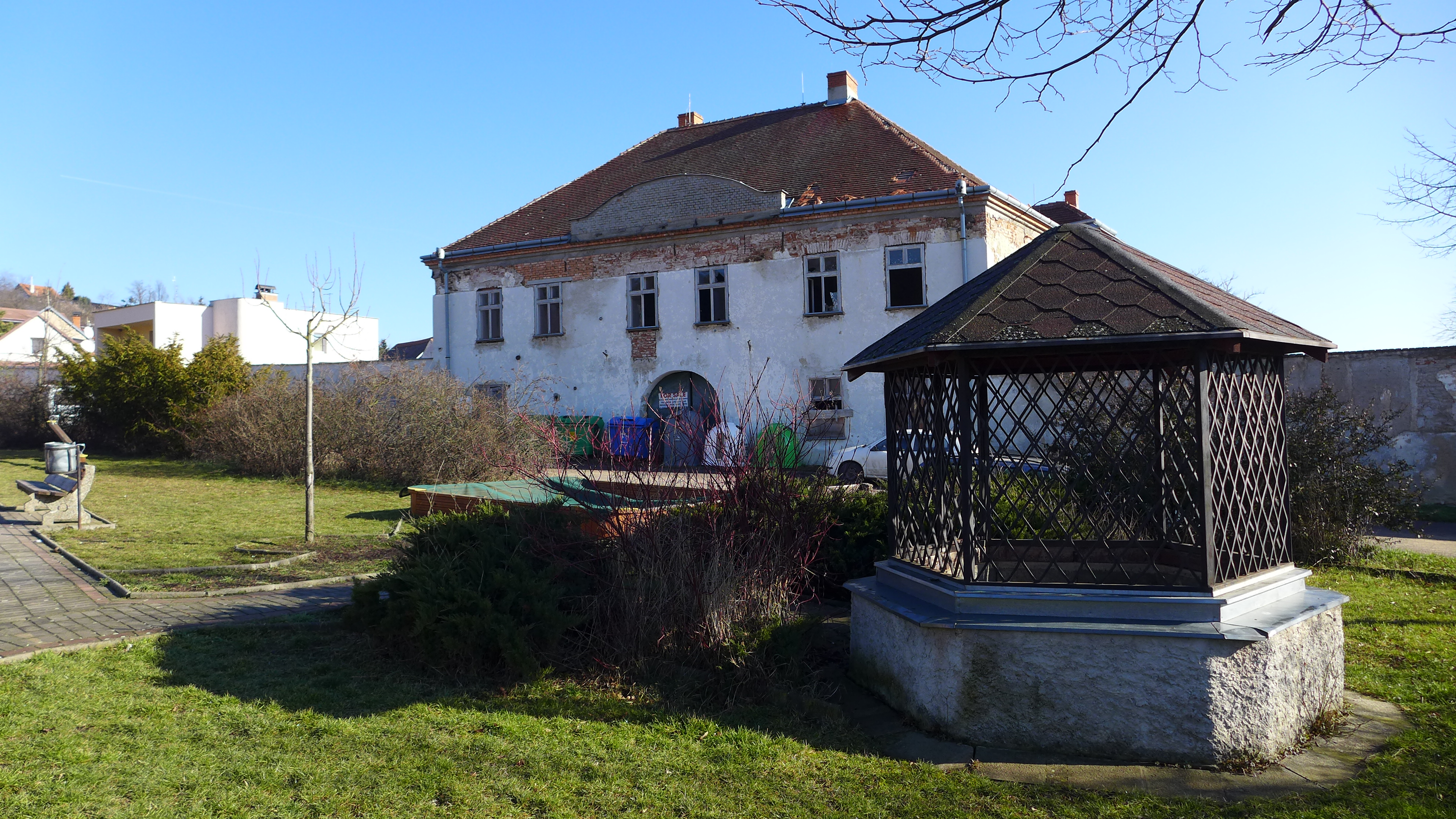
- Dyje Castle

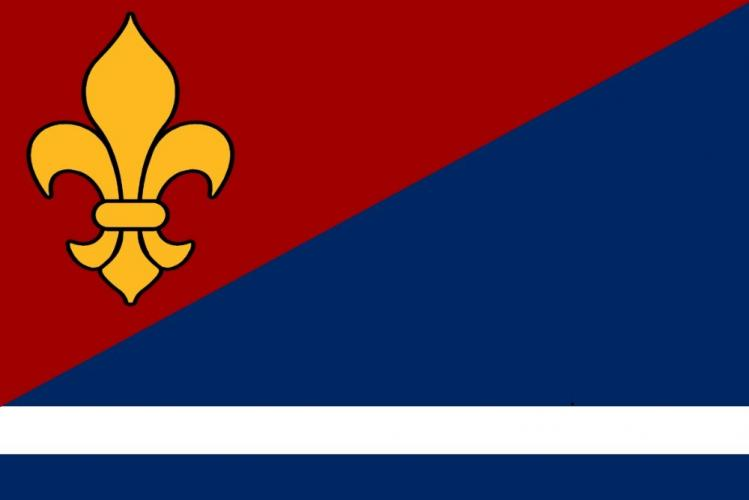
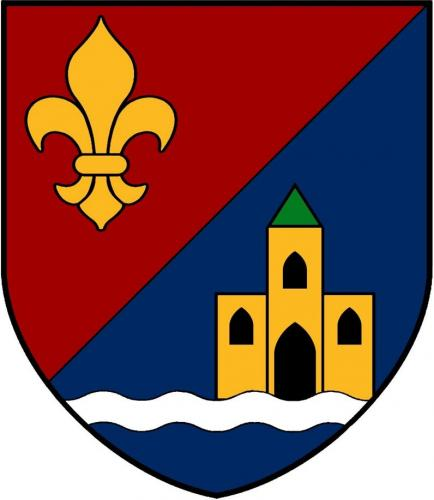
- Flag Coat of arms

- Location in the Czech Republic
- Coordinates: 48°50′50″N 16°6′59″E
- Country: Czech Republic
- Region: South Moravian
- District: Znojmo
- First mentioned: 1283

Area
  - Total: 4.60 km^{2} (1.78 sq mi)
- Elevation: 214 m (702 ft)

Population (2026-01-01)
  - Total: 509
  - Density: 111/km^{2} (287/sq mi)
- Time zone: UTC+1 (CET)
  - Summer (DST): UTC+2 (CEST)
- Postal code: 669 02
- Website: www.obec-dyje.cz

Dyje (German: Mühlfraun) is a municipality and village in Znojmo District in the South Moravian Region of the Czech Republic. It has about 500 inhabitants.

Dyje lies approximately 7 kilometres (4 mi) east of Znojmo, 53 km (33 mi) south-west of Brno, and 185 km (115 mi) south-east of Prague.

== Demographics ==
Historical population
Year	Pop.	±%
1869	493	—
1880	464	−5.9%
1890	454	−2.2%
1900	455	+0.2%
1910	461	+1.3%
1921	489	+6.1%
1930	519	+6.1%
1950	480	−7.5%
1961	448	−6.7%
1970	391	−12.7%
1980	425	+8.7%
1991	374	−12.0%
2001	356	−4.8%
2011	420	+18.0%
2021	492	+17.1%
Source: Censuses
