= Lančov =

- Municipality
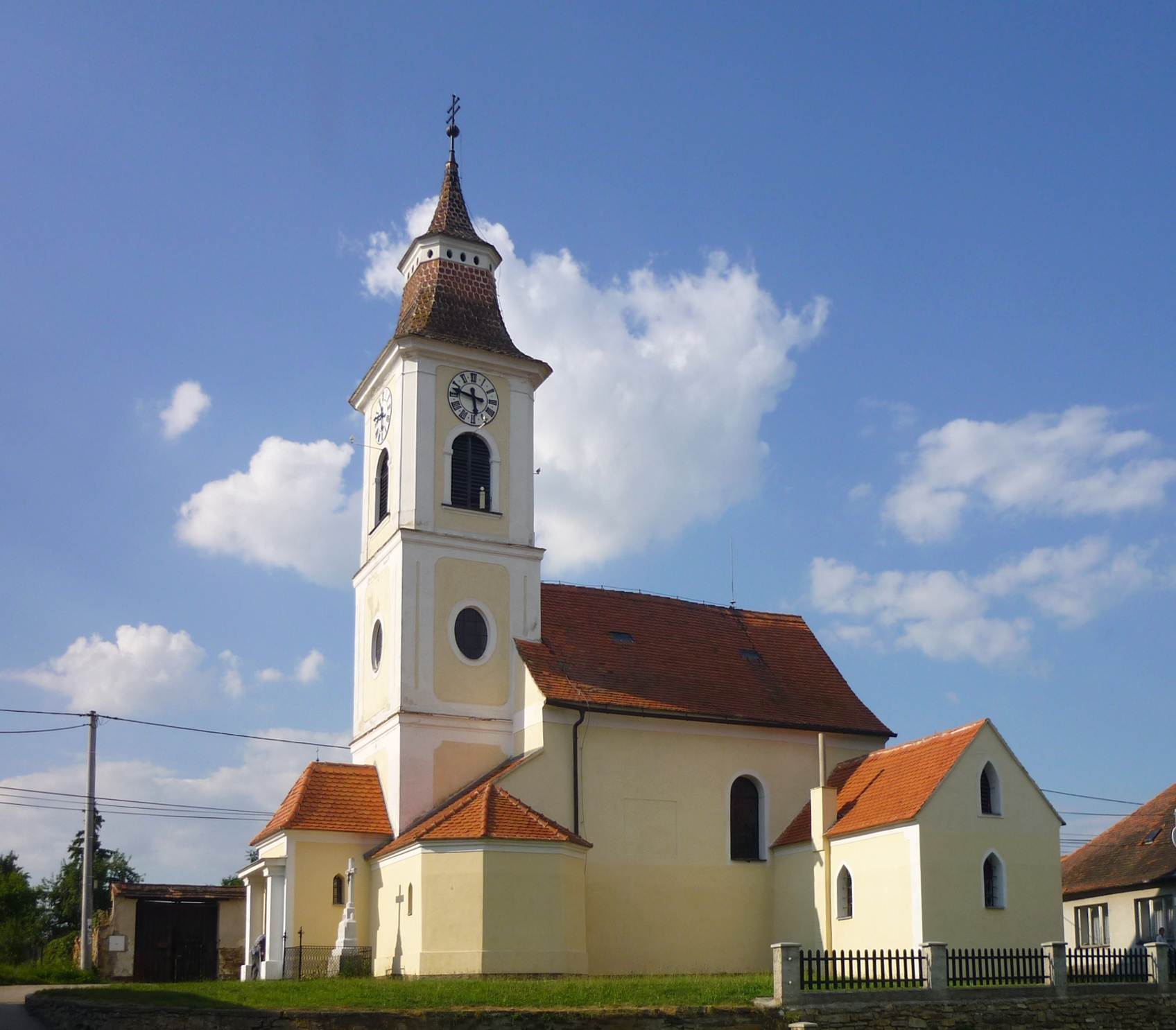
- Church of Saint Mary Magdalene

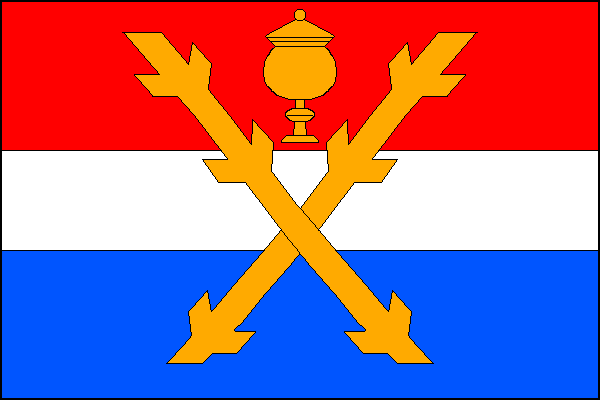
- Flag Coat of arms

- Location in the Czech Republic
- Coordinates: 48°54′26″N 15°46′4″E
- Country: Czech Republic
- Region: South Moravian
- District: Znojmo
- First mentioned: 1323

Area
  - Total: 15.20 km^{2} (5.87 sq mi)
- Elevation: 427 m (1,401 ft)

Population (2026-01-01)
  - Total: 204
  - Density: 13.4/km^{2} (34.8/sq mi)
- Time zone: UTC+1 (CET)
  - Summer (DST): UTC+2 (CEST)
- Postal code: 671 06
- Website: www.obeclancov.cz

Lančov is a municipality and village in Znojmo District in the South Moravian Region of the Czech Republic. It has about 200 inhabitants.

Lančov lies approximately 21 kilometres (13 mi) west of Znojmo, 70 km (43 mi) south-west of Brno, and 163 km (101 mi) south-east of Prague.

== Demographics ==
Historical population
Year	Pop.	±%
1869	427	—
1880	427	+0.0%
1890	442	+3.5%
1900	429	−2.9%
1910	432	+0.7%
1921	454	+5.1%
1930	441	−2.9%
1950	333	−24.5%
1961	327	−1.8%
1970	279	−14.7%
1980	274	−1.8%
1991	257	−6.2%
2001	251	−2.3%
2011	222	−11.6%
2021	203	−8.6%
Source: Censuses
