= Starý Petřín =

- Municipality
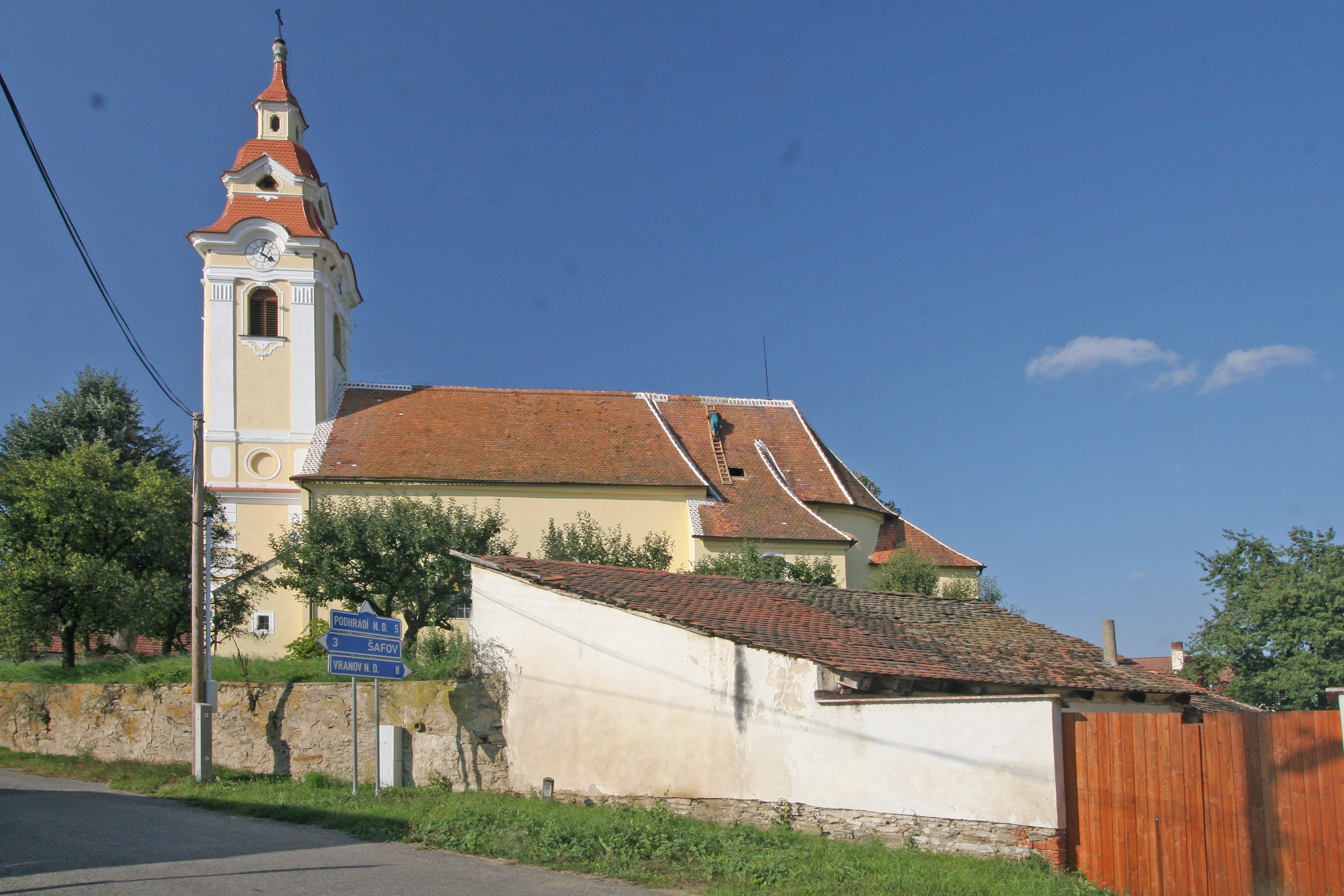
- Church of the Beheading of St. John the Baptist

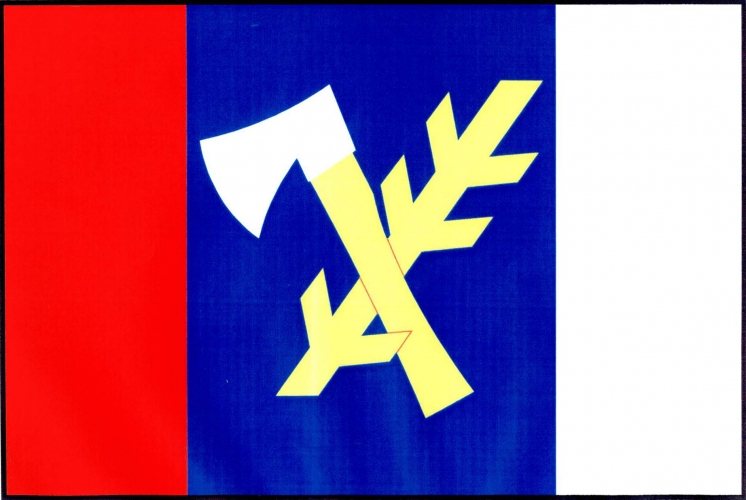
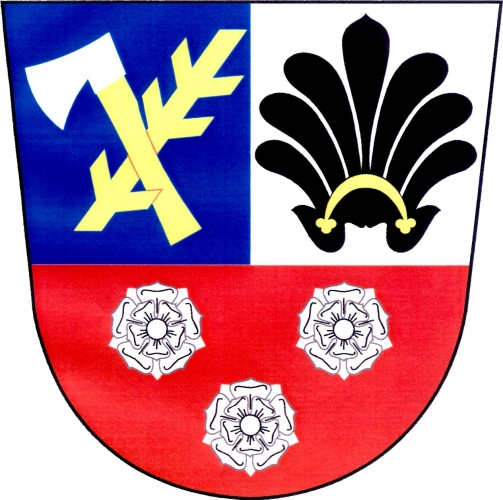
- Flag Coat of arms

- Location in the Czech Republic
- Coordinates: 48°53′24″N 15°44′3″E
- Country: Czech Republic
- Region: South Moravian
- District: Znojmo
- First mentioned: 1323

Area
  - Total: 18.56 km^{2} (7.17 sq mi)
- Elevation: 430 m (1,410 ft)

Population (2026-01-01)
  - Total: 228
  - Density: 12.3/km^{2} (31.8/sq mi)
- Time zone: UTC+1 (CET)
  - Summer (DST): UTC+2 (CEST)
- Postal code: 671 06
- Website: www.starypetrin.cz

Starý Petřín is a municipality and village in Znojmo District in the South Moravian Region of the Czech Republic. It has about 200 inhabitants.

Starý Petřín lies approximately 24 kilometres (15 mi) west of Znojmo, 74 km (46 mi) south-west of Brno, and 163 km (101 mi) south-east of Prague.

== Administrative division ==
Starý Petřín consists of three municipal parts (in brackets population according to the 2021 census):

- Starý Petřín (111)
- Jazovice (82)
- Nový Petřín (29)

== Demographics ==
Historical population
| Year | Pop. | ±% |
|---|---|---|
| 1869 | 598 | — |
| 1880 | 633 | +5.9% |
| 1890 | 642 | +1.4% |
| 1900 | 615 | −4.2% |
| 1910 | 567 | −7.8% |
| 1921 | 608 | +7.2% |
| 1930 | 596 | −2.0% |
| 1950 | 416 | −30.2% |
| 1961 | 446 | +7.2% |
| 1970 | 354 | −20.6% |
| 1980 | 334 | −5.6% |
| 1991 | 298 | −10.8% |
| 2001 | 266 | −10.7% |
| 2011 | 223 | −16.2% |
| 2021 | 222 | −0.4% |
Source: Censuses
