= Podmolí =

- Municipality
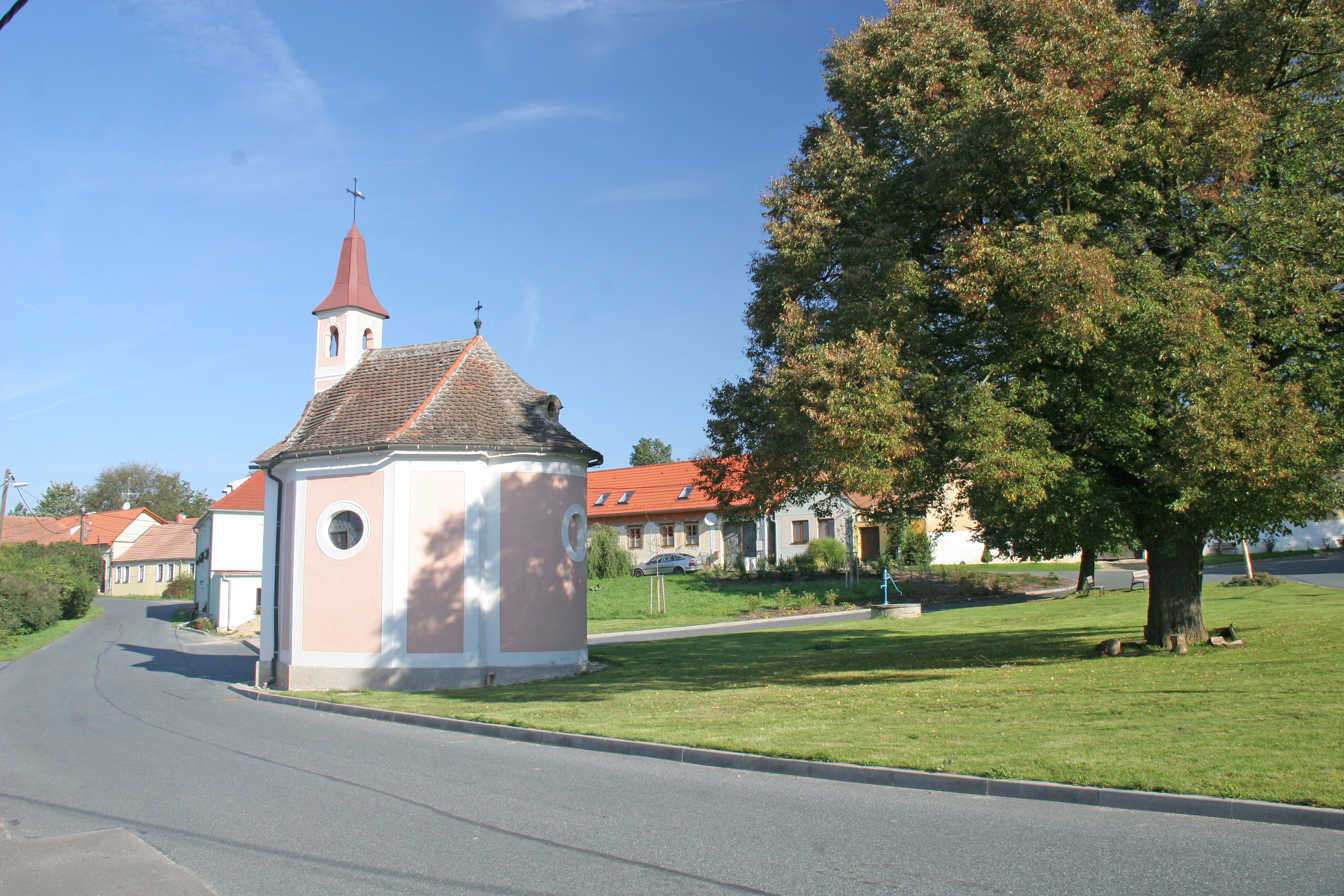
- Chapel of Our Lady of Sorrows

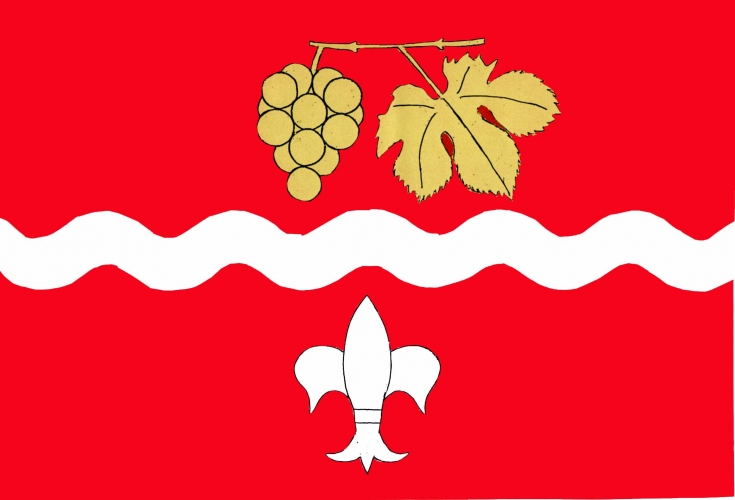
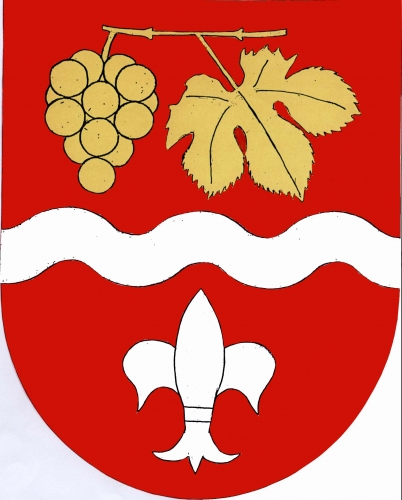
- Flag Coat of arms

- Location in the Czech Republic
- Coordinates: 48°51′2″N 15°56′24″E
- Country: Czech Republic
- Region: South Moravian
- District: Znojmo
- First mentioned: 1433

Area
  - Total: 13.83 km^{2} (5.34 sq mi)
- Elevation: 402 m (1,319 ft)

Population (2026-01-01)
  - Total: 164
  - Density: 11.9/km^{2} (30.7/sq mi)
- Time zone: UTC+1 (CET)
  - Summer (DST): UTC+2 (CEST)
- Postal code: 669 02
- Website: www.podmoli.cz

Podmolí is a municipality and village in Znojmo District in the South Moravian Region of the Czech Republic. It has about 200 inhabitants.

Podmolí lies approximately 7 kilometres (4 mi) west of Znojmo, 64 km (40 mi) south-west of Brno, and 178 km (111 mi) south-east of Prague.

== Demographics ==
Historical population
| Year | Pop. | ±% |
|---|---|---|
| 1869 | 253 | — |
| 1880 | 263 | +4.0% |
| 1890 | 295 | +12.2% |
| 1900 | 264 | −10.5% |
| 1910 | 260 | −1.5% |
| 1921 | 298 | +14.6% |
| 1930 | 335 | +12.4% |
| 1950 | 242 | −27.8% |
| 1961 | 257 | +6.2% |
| 1970 | 211 | −17.9% |
| 1980 | 180 | −14.7% |
| 1991 | 187 | +3.9% |
| 2001 | 162 | −13.4% |
| 2011 | 160 | −1.2% |
| 2021 | 168 | +5.0% |
Source: Censuses
