= Strachotice =

- Municipality
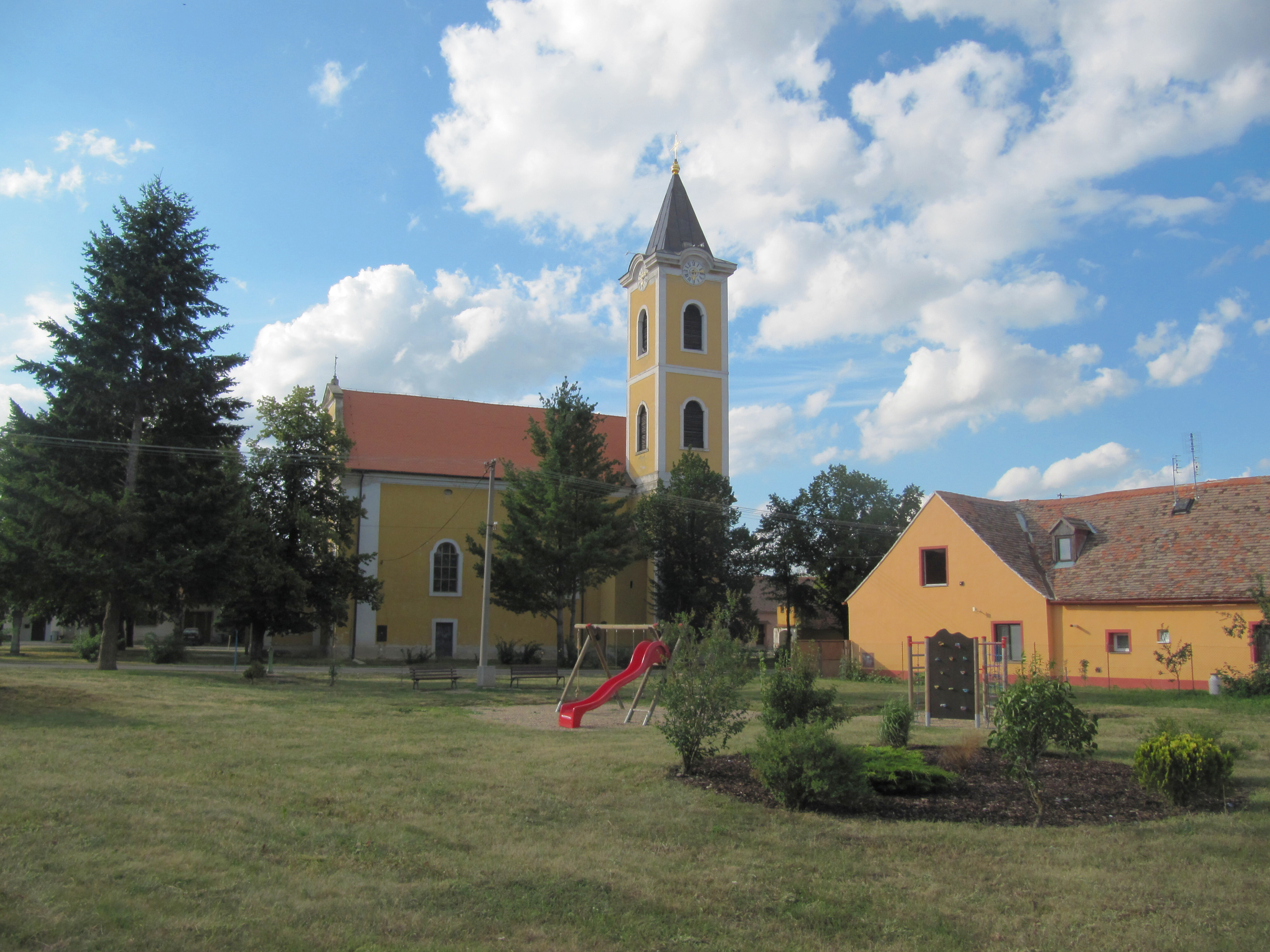
- Church of Saint George

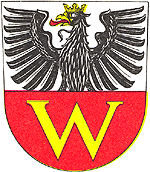
- Coat of arms

- Location in the Czech Republic
- Coordinates: 48°47′46″N 16°10′20″E
- Country: Czech Republic
- Region: South Moravian
- District: Znojmo
- First mentioned: 1190

Area
  - Total: 20.48 km^{2} (7.91 sq mi)
- Elevation: 197 m (646 ft)

Population (2026-01-01)
  - Total: 1,031
  - Density: 50.34/km^{2} (130.4/sq mi)
- Time zone: UTC+1 (CET)
  - Summer (DST): UTC+2 (CEST)
- Postal code: 671 29
- Website: www.strachotice.cz

Strachotice is a municipality and village in Znojmo District in the South Moravian Region of the Czech Republic. It has about 1,000 inhabitants.

Strachotice lies approximately 12 kilometres (7 mi) south-east of Znojmo, 55 km (34 mi) south-west of Brno, and 192 km (119 mi) south-east of Prague.

== Administrative division ==
Strachotice consists of two municipal parts (in brackets population according to the 2021 census):

- Strachotice (443)
- Micmanice (561)

== Demographics ==
Historical population
| Year | Pop. | ±% |
|---|---|---|
| 1869 | 1,801 | — |
| 1880 | 1,991 | +10.5% |
| 1890 | 2,028 | +1.9% |
| 1900 | 2,030 | +0.1% |
| 1910 | 2,061 | +1.5% |
| 1921 | 2,061 | +0.0% |
| 1930 | 2,120 | +2.9% |
| 1950 | 1,161 | −45.2% |
| 1961 | 1,076 | −7.3% |
| 1970 | 935 | −13.1% |
| 1980 | 924 | −1.2% |
| 1991 | 943 | +2.1% |
| 2001 | 957 | +1.5% |
| 2011 | 1,001 | +4.6% |
| 2021 | 1,004 | +0.3% |
Source: Censuses
