= Litobratřice =

- Municipality
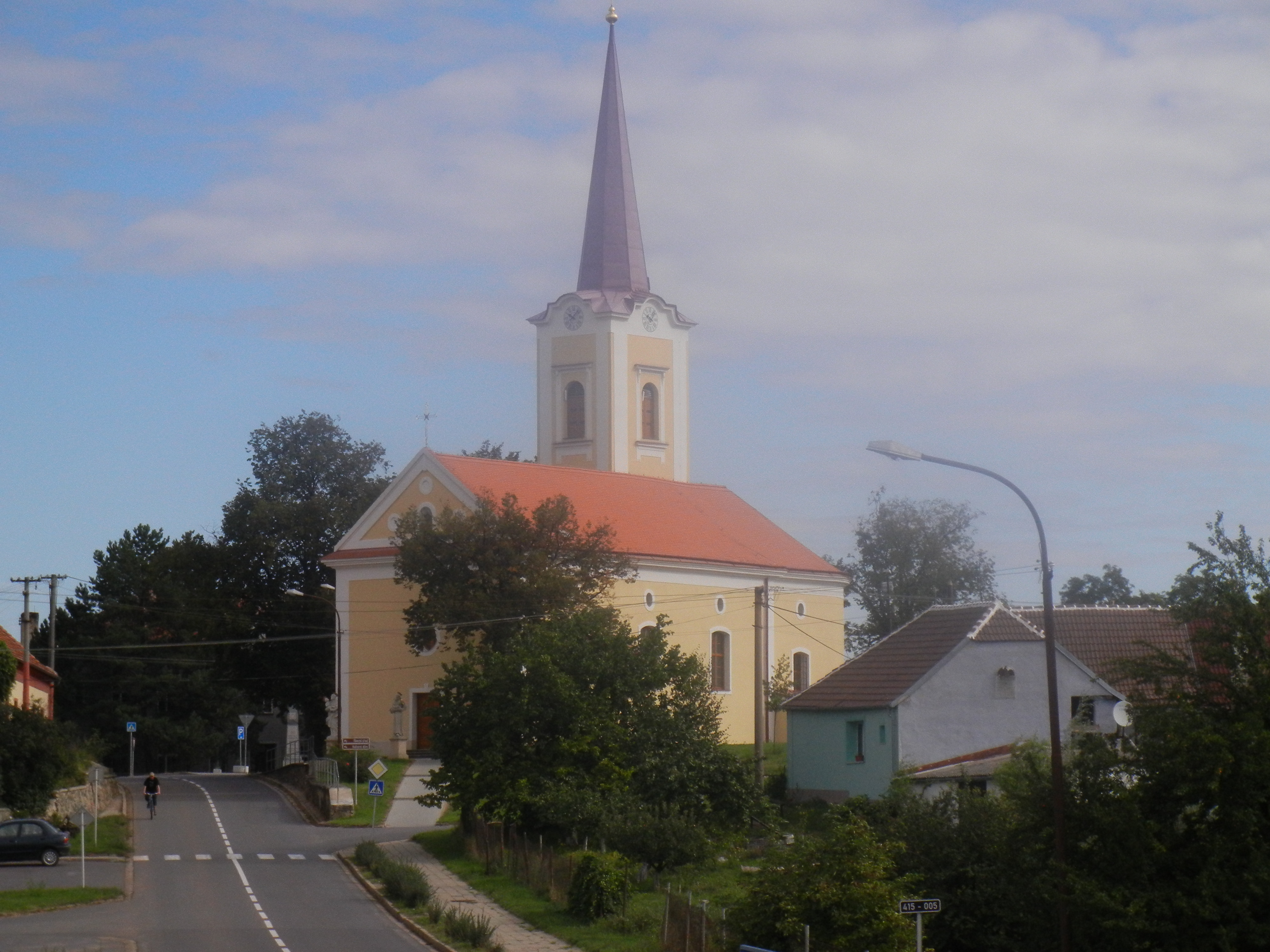
- Church of Saint George

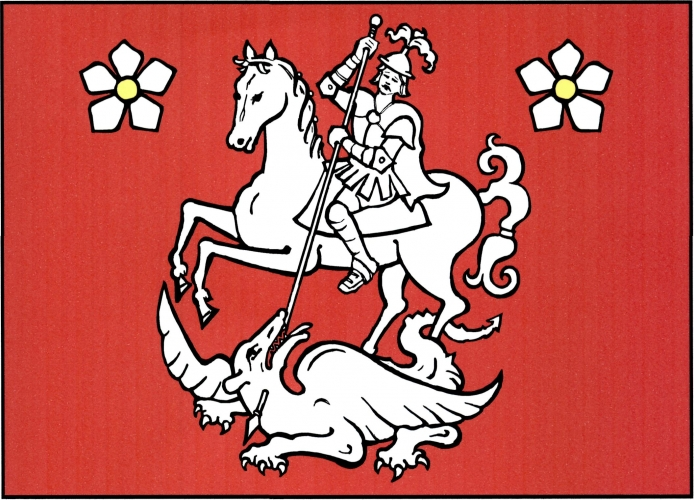
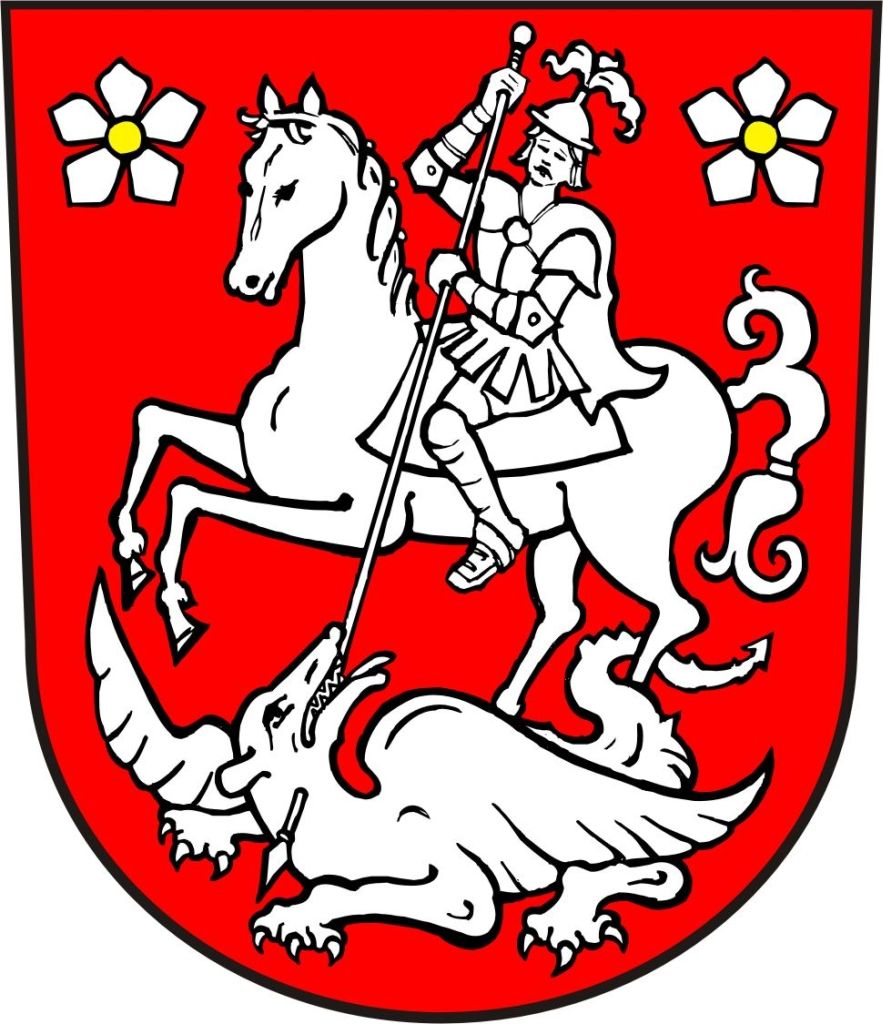
- Flag Coat of arms

- Location in the Czech Republic
- Coordinates: 48°53′13″N 16°24′9″E
- Country: Czech Republic
- Region: South Moravian
- District: Znojmo
- First mentioned: 1278

Area
  - Total: 19.88 km^{2} (7.68 sq mi)
- Elevation: 220 m (720 ft)

Population (2026-01-01)
  - Total: 516
  - Density: 26.0/km^{2} (67.2/sq mi)
- Time zone: UTC+1 (CET)
  - Summer (DST): UTC+2 (CEST)
- Postal code: 671 78
- Website: www.litobratrice.cz

Litobratřice is a municipality and village in Znojmo District in the South Moravian Region of the Czech Republic. It has about 500 inhabitants.

Litobratřice lies approximately 28 kilometres (17 mi) east of Znojmo, 39 km (24 mi) south-west of Brno, and 196 km (122 mi) south-east of Prague.

== Demographics ==
Historical population
Year	Pop.	±%
1869	1,202	—
1880	1,326	+10.3%
1890	1,259	−5.1%
1900	1,267	+0.6%
1910	1,286	+1.5%
1921	1,320	+2.6%
1930	1,318	−0.2%
1950	791	−40.0%
1961	692	−12.5%
1970	622	−10.1%
1980	586	−5.8%
1991	524	−10.6%
2001	505	−3.6%
2011	492	−2.6%
2021	477	−3.0%
Source: Censuses
