= Kyjovice =

Kyjovice may refer to places in the Czech Republic:

- Kyjovice (Opava District), a municipality and village in the Moravian-Silesian Region
- Kyjovice (Znojmo District), a municipality and village in the South Moravian Region
