= Kyjovice (Znojmo District) =

- Municipality
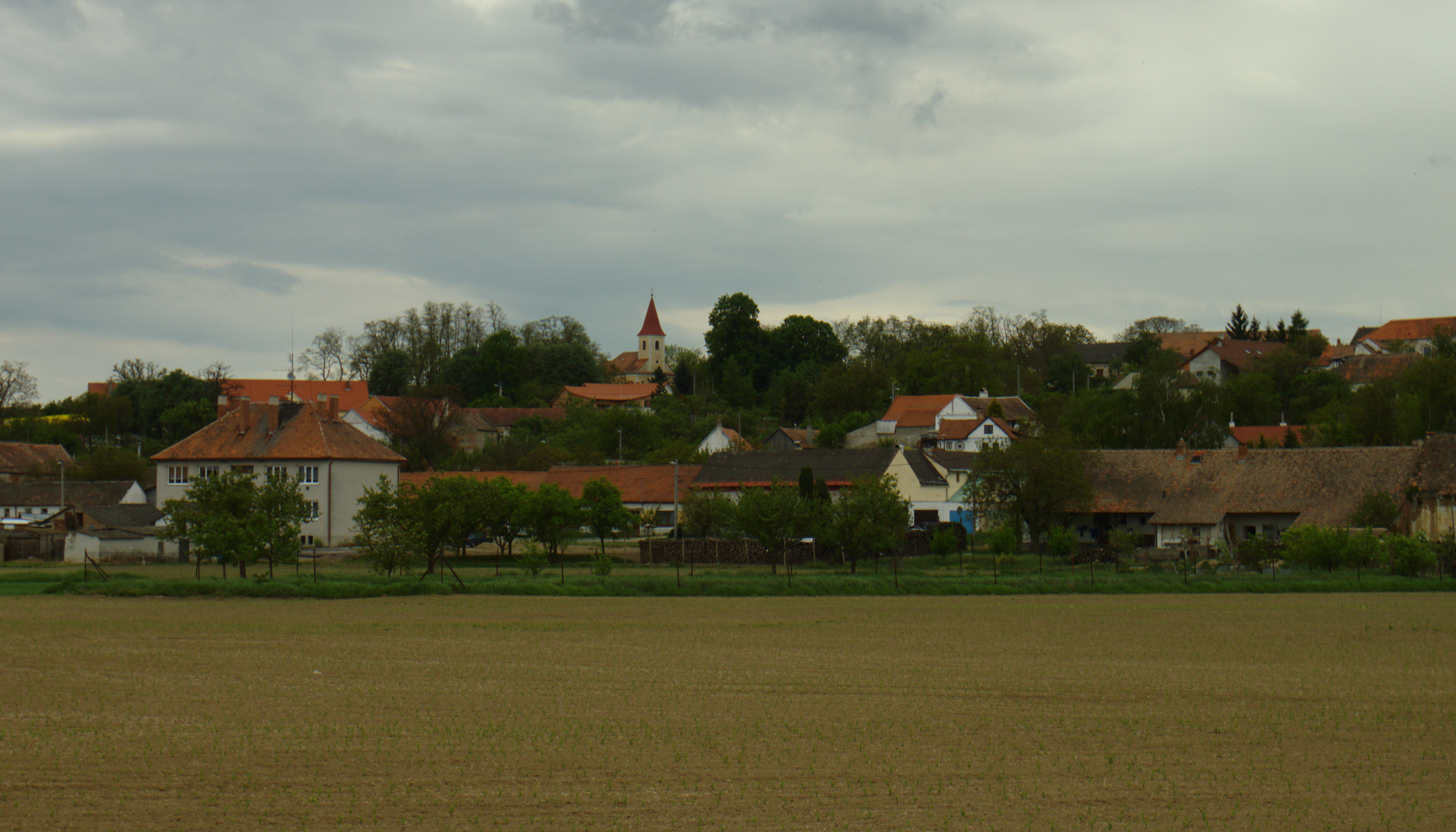
- View from the north

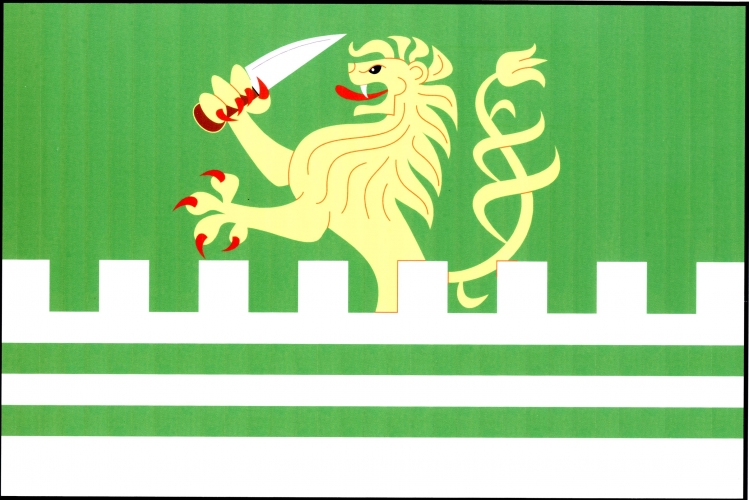
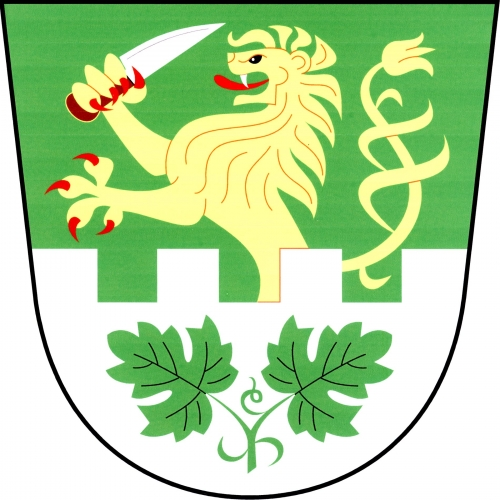
- Flag Coat of arms

- Location in the Czech Republic
- Coordinates: 48°54′50″N 16°9′59″E
- Country: Czech Republic
- Region: South Moravian
- District: Znojmo
- First mentioned: 1275

Area
  - Total: 6.52 km^{2} (2.52 sq mi)
- Elevation: 215 m (705 ft)

Population (2026-01-01)
  - Total: 154
  - Density: 23.6/km^{2} (61.2/sq mi)
- Time zone: UTC+1 (CET)
  - Summer (DST): UTC+2 (CEST)
- Postal code: 671 61
- Website: www.obeckyjovice.cz

Kyjovice is a municipality and village in Znojmo District in the South Moravian Region of the Czech Republic. It has about 200 inhabitants.

Kyjovice lies approximately 11 kilometres (7 mi) north-east of Znojmo, 48 km (30 mi) south-west of Brno, and 181 km (112 mi) south-east of Prague.

== Demographics ==
Historical population
Year	Pop.	±%
1869	271	—
1880	264	−2.6%
1890	280	+6.1%
1900	283	+1.1%
1910	279	−1.4%
1921	287	+2.9%
1930	307	+7.0%
1950	263	−14.3%
1961	260	−1.1%
1970	222	−14.6%
1980	188	−15.3%
1991	143	−23.9%
2001	150	+4.9%
2011	137	−8.7%
2021	139	+1.5%
Source: Censuses
