= Suchohrdly u Miroslavi =

- Municipality
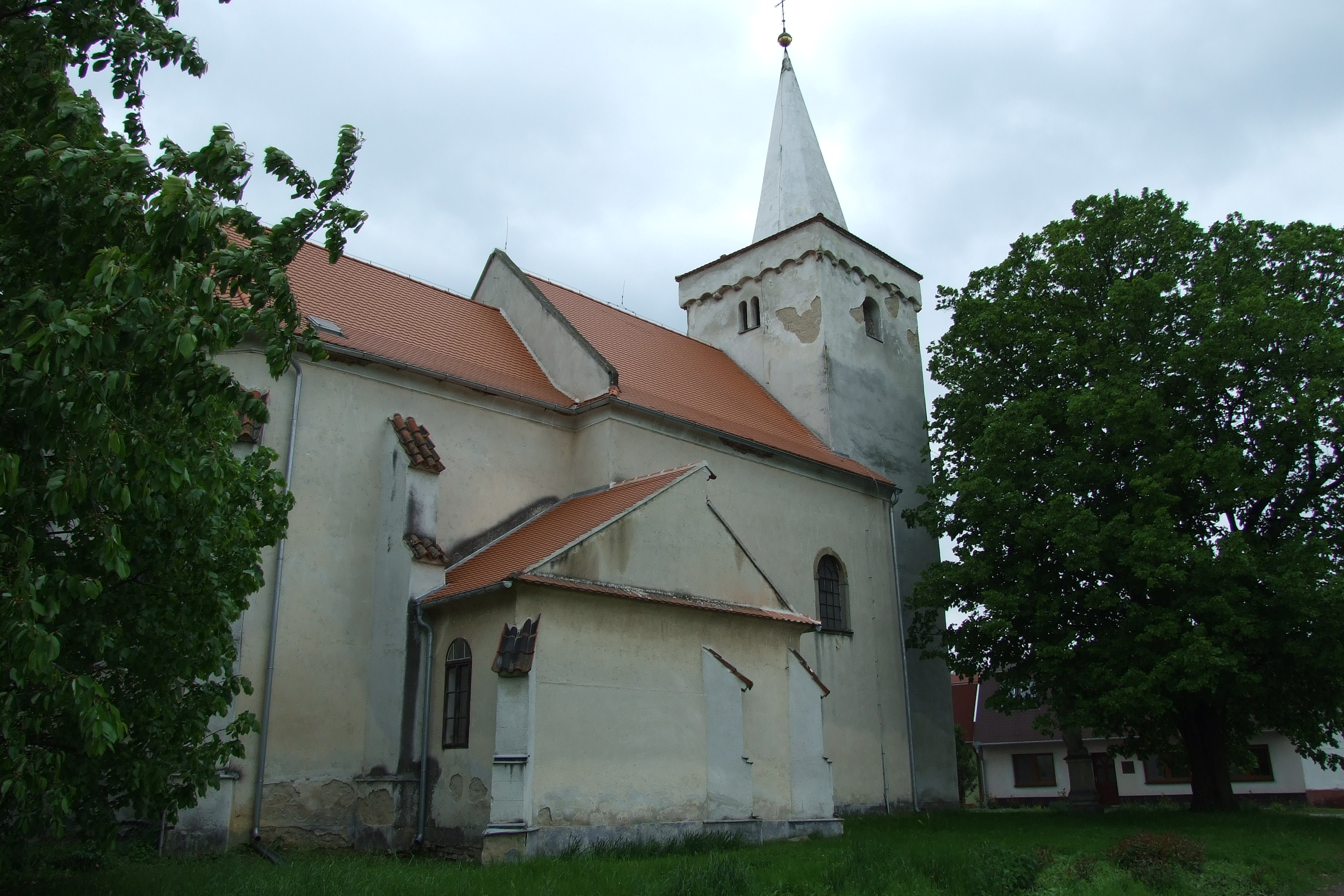
- Church of Saint Margaret

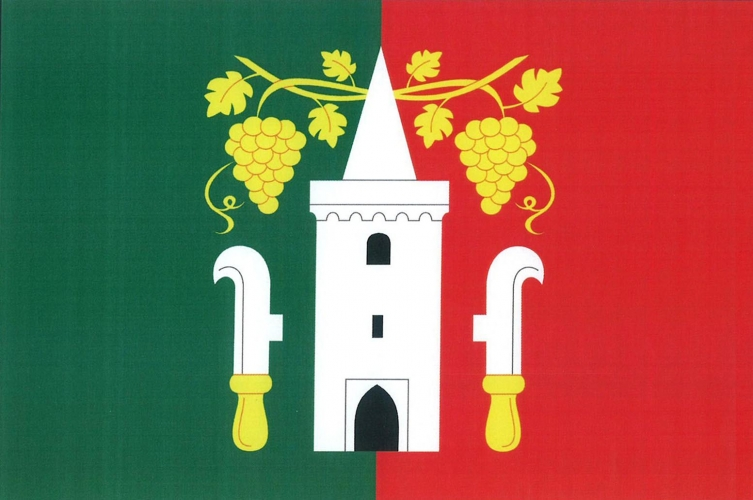
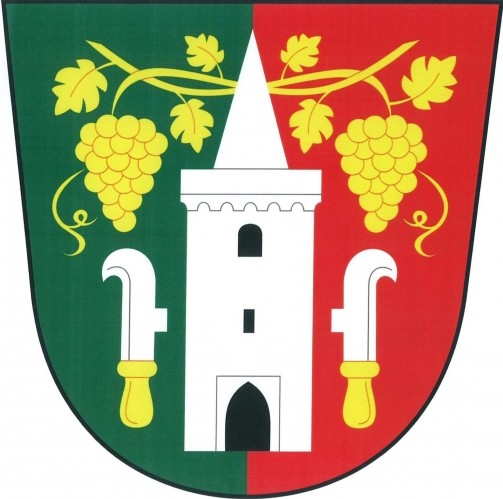
- Flag Coat of arms

- Location in the Czech Republic
- Coordinates: 48°56′35″N 16°21′48″E
- Country: Czech Republic
- Region: South Moravian
- District: Znojmo
- First mentioned: 1360

Area
  - Total: 7.83 km^{2} (3.02 sq mi)
- Elevation: 230 m (750 ft)

Population (2026-01-01)
  - Total: 539
  - Density: 68.8/km^{2} (178/sq mi)
- Time zone: UTC+1 (CET)
  - Summer (DST): UTC+2 (CEST)
- Postal code: 671 72
- Website: www.suchohrdlyumiroslavi.cz

Suchohrdly u Miroslavi (German: Socherl) is a municipality and village in Znojmo District in the South Moravian Region of the Czech Republic. It has about 500 inhabitants.

Suchohrdly u Miroslavi lies approximately 28 kilometres (17 mi) north-east of Znojmo, 33 km (21 mi) south-west of Brno, and 190 km (120 mi) south-east of Prague.

== Demographics ==
Historical population
Year	Pop.	±%
1869	473	—
1880	459	−3.0%
1890	466	+1.5%
1900	552	+18.5%
1910	605	+9.6%
1921	649	+7.3%
1930	710	+9.4%
1950	534	−24.8%
1961	570	+6.7%
1970	509	−10.7%
1980	467	−8.3%
1991	384	−17.8%
2001	416	+8.3%
2011	464	+11.5%
2021	486	+4.7%
Source: Censuses
