= Mackovice =

- Municipality
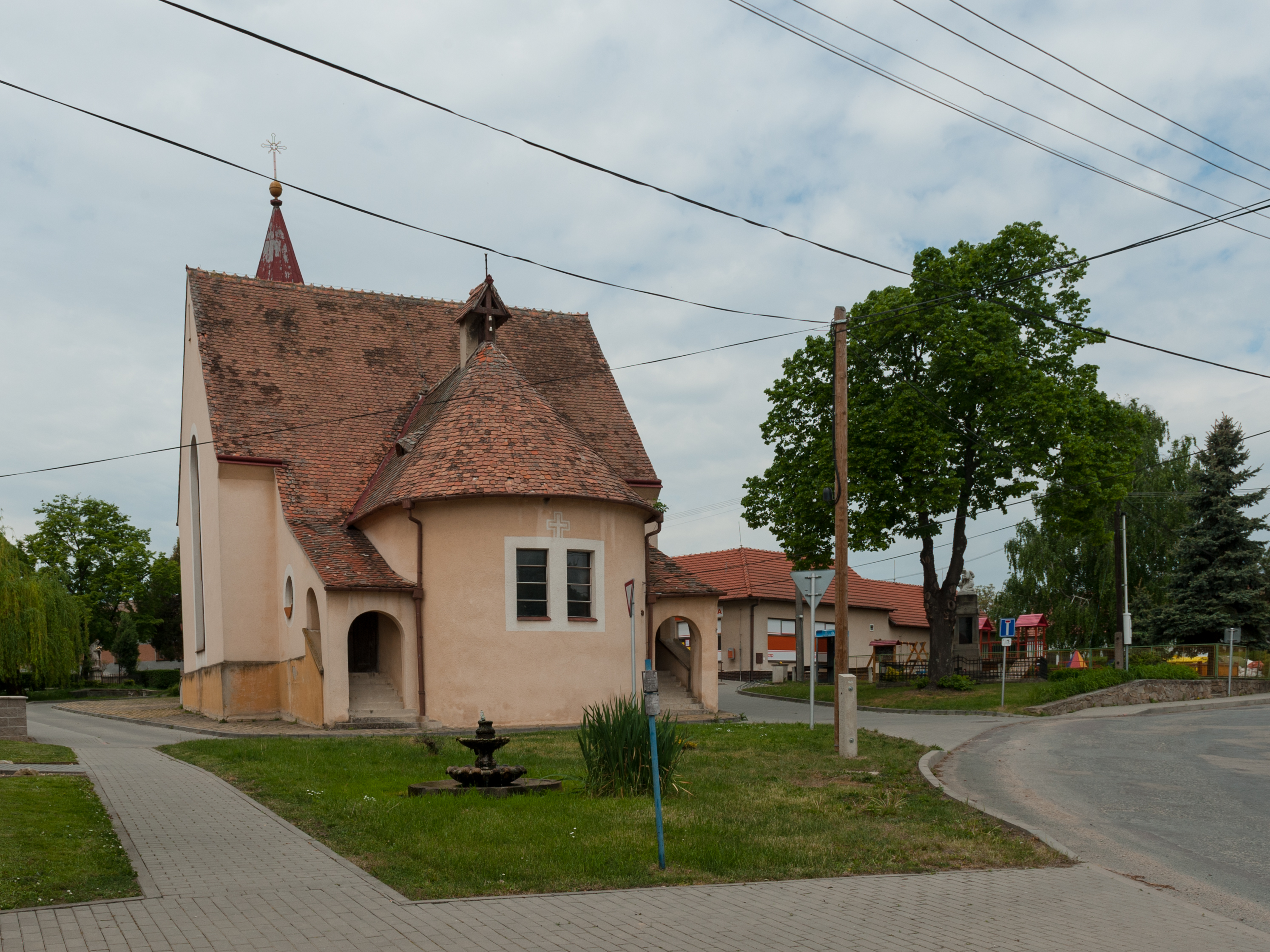
- Church of the Engagement of the Virgin Mary

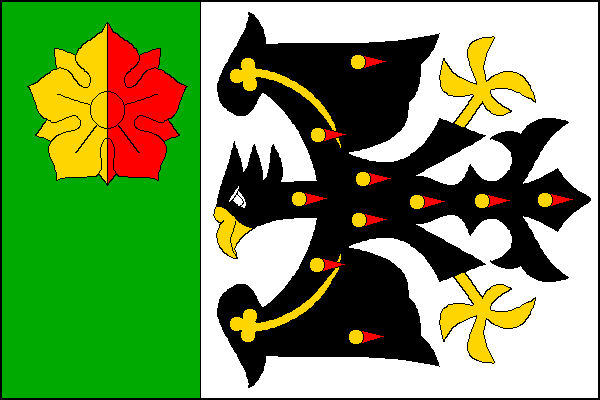
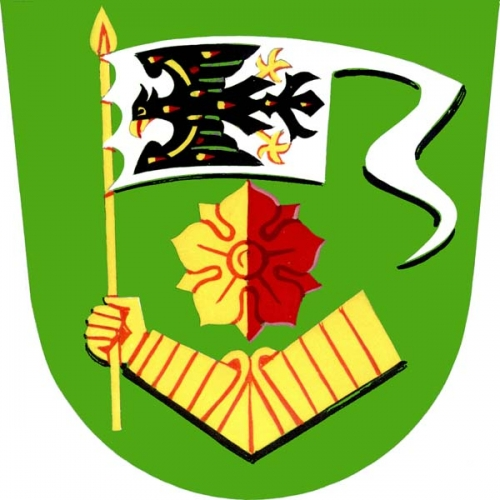
- Flag Coat of arms

- Location in the Czech Republic
- Coordinates: 48°53′1″N 16°18′34″E
- Country: Czech Republic
- Region: South Moravian
- District: Znojmo
- First mentioned: 1228

Area
  - Total: 11.80 km^{2} (4.56 sq mi)
- Elevation: 228 m (748 ft)

Population (2026-01-01)
  - Total: 381
  - Density: 32.3/km^{2} (83.6/sq mi)
- Time zone: UTC+1 (CET)
  - Summer (DST): UTC+2 (CEST)
- Postal code: 671 78
- Website: www.mackovice.cz

Mackovice (German: Moskowitz) is a municipality and village in Znojmo District in the South Moravian Region of the Czech Republic. It has about 400 inhabitants.

Mackovice lies approximately 21 kilometres (13 mi) east of Znojmo, 41 km (25 mi) south-west of Brno, and 191 km (119 mi) south-east of Prague.

== Demographics ==
Historical population
Year	Pop.	±%
1869	575	—
1880	630	+9.6%
1890	652	+3.5%
1900	708	+8.6%
1910	728	+2.8%
1921	690	−5.2%
1930	791	+14.6%
1950	518	−34.5%
1961	523	+1.0%
1970	497	−5.0%
1980	443	−10.9%
1991	336	−24.2%
2001	361	+7.4%
2011	369	+2.2%
2021	362	−1.9%
Source: Censuses
