= Damnice =

- Municipality
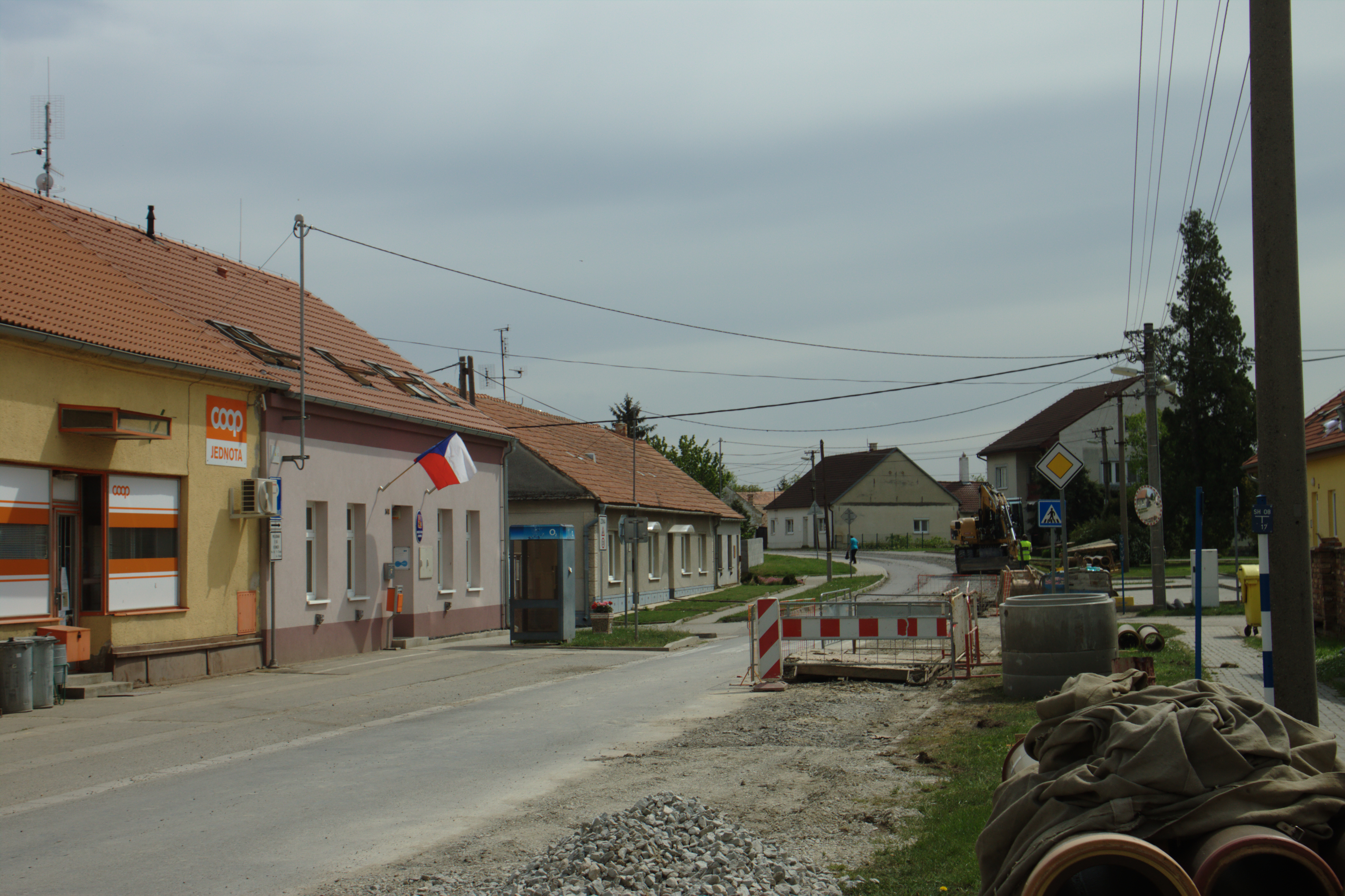
- Main road

- Location in the Czech Republic
- Coordinates: 48°55′13″N 16°22′27″E
- Country: Czech Republic
- Region: South Moravian
- District: Znojmo
- First mentioned: 1353

Area
  - Total: 7.99 km^{2} (3.08 sq mi)
- Elevation: 198 m (650 ft)

Population (2026-01-01)
  - Total: 390
  - Density: 49/km^{2} (130/sq mi)
- Time zone: UTC+1 (CET)
  - Summer (DST): UTC+2 (CEST)
- Postal code: 671 78
- Website: www.obecdamnice.cz

Damnice is a municipality and village in Znojmo District in the South Moravian Region of the Czech Republic. It has about 400 inhabitants.

Damnice lies approximately 26 kilometres (16 mi) east of Znojmo, 37 km (23 mi) south-west of Brno, and 192 km (119 mi) south-east of Prague.

== History ==
The first written mention of Damnice is from 1353.

== Demographics ==
Historical population
Year	Pop.	±%
1869	328	—
1880	433	+32.0%
1890	422	−2.5%
1900	468	+10.9%
1910	532	+13.7%
1921	579	+8.8%
1930	547	−5.5%
1950	376	−31.3%
1961	360	−4.3%
1970	351	−2.5%
1980	367	+4.6%
1991	341	−7.1%
2001	323	−5.3%
2011	323	+0.0%
2021	346	+7.1%
Source: Censuses
