= Trnové Pole =

- Municipality
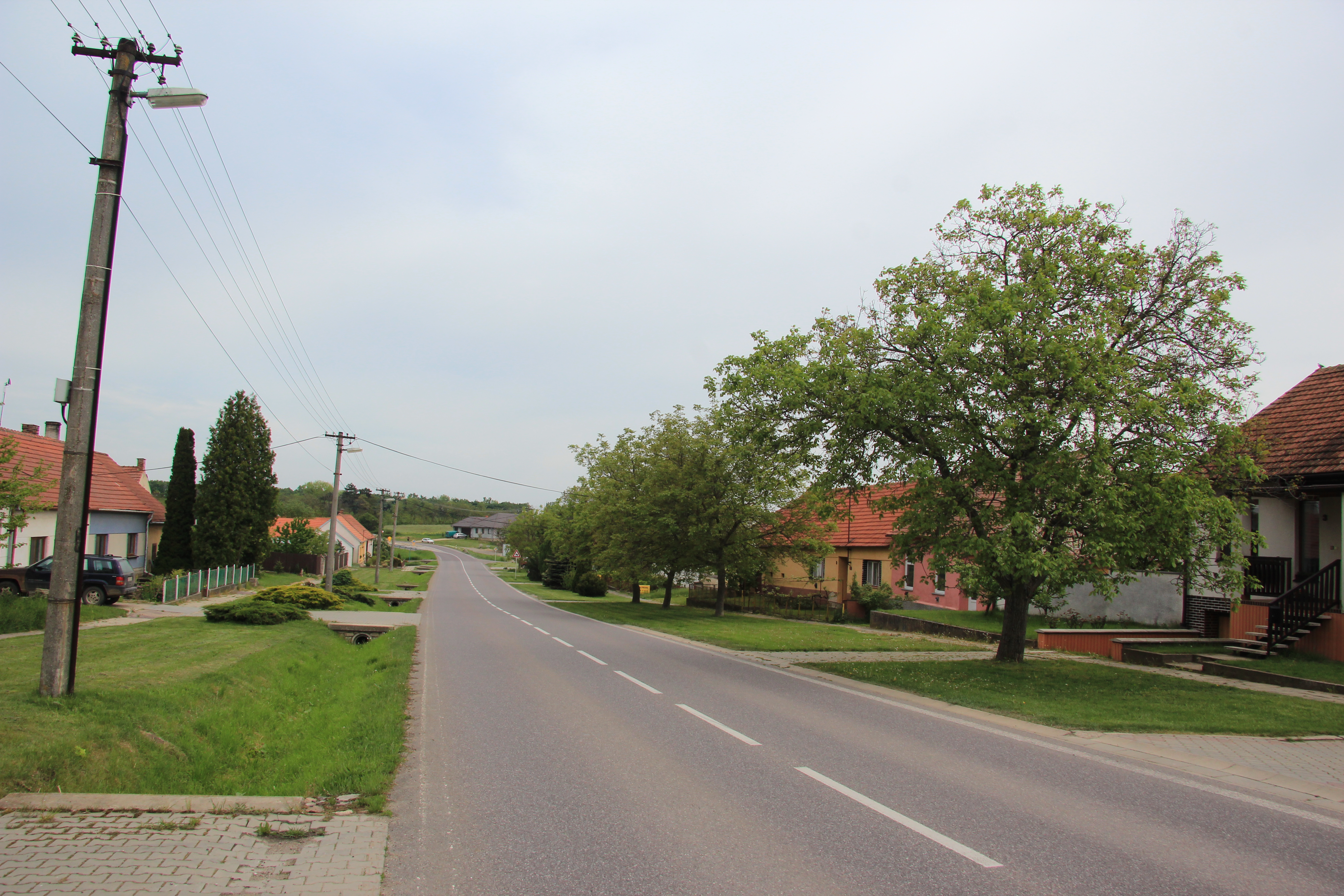
- Main street

- Flag Coat of arms

- Location in the Czech Republic
- Coordinates: 48°56′42″N 16°24′34″E
- Country: Czech Republic
- Region: South Moravian
- District: Znojmo
- First mentioned: 1785

Area
  - Total: 4.44 km^{2} (1.71 sq mi)
- Elevation: 191 m (627 ft)

Population (2026-01-01)
  - Total: 115
  - Density: 25.9/km^{2} (67.1/sq mi)
- Time zone: UTC+1 (CET)
  - Summer (DST): UTC+2 (CEST)
- Postal code: 671 78
- Website: www.trnovepole.cz

Trnové Pole (German: Dornfeld) is a municipality and village in Znojmo District in the South Moravian Region of the Czech Republic. It has about 100 inhabitants.

Trnové Pole lies approximately 31 kilometres (19 mi) east of Znojmo, 32 km (20 mi) south-west of Brno, and 193 km (120 mi) south-east of Prague.

== Demographics ==
Historical population
Year	Pop.	±%
1869	260	—
1880	283	+8.8%
1890	233	−17.7%
1900	215	−7.7%
1910	216	+0.5%
1921	223	+3.2%
1930	219	−1.8%
1950	152	−30.6%
1961	182	+19.7%
1970	193	+6.0%
1980	183	−5.2%
1991	151	−17.5%
2001	130	−13.9%
2011	126	−3.1%
2021	118	−6.3%
Source: Censuses
