= Šerkovice =

- Municipality
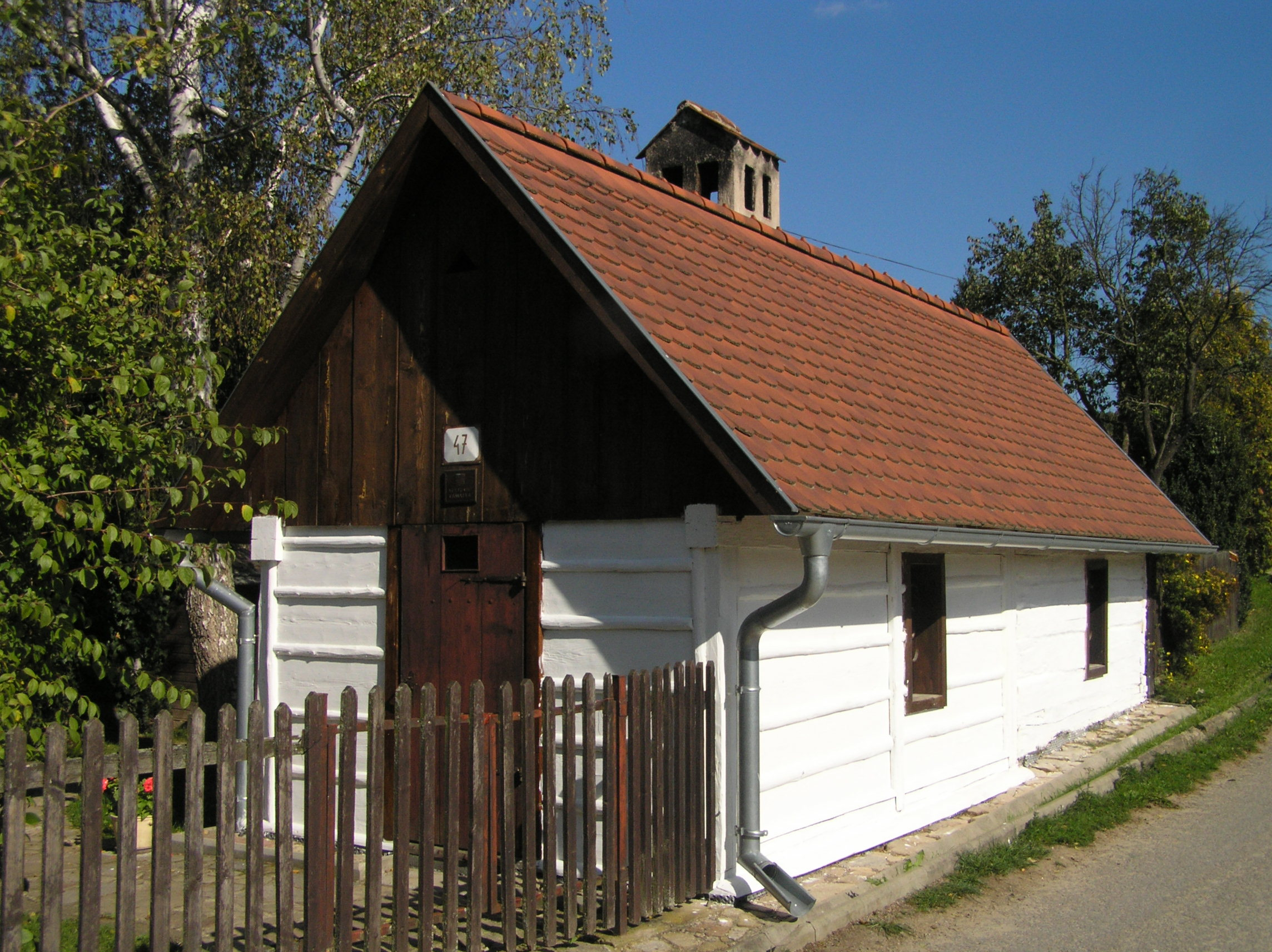
- Fruit dryer, a cultural monument

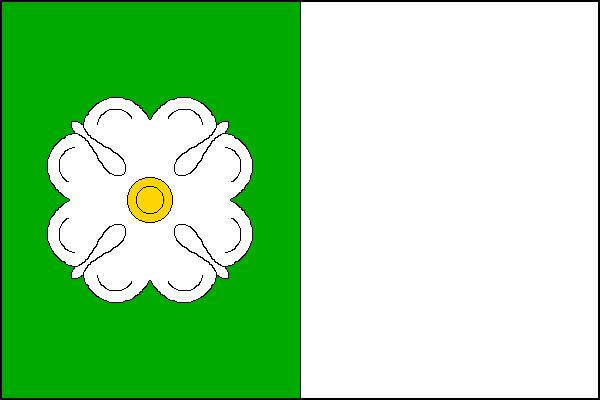
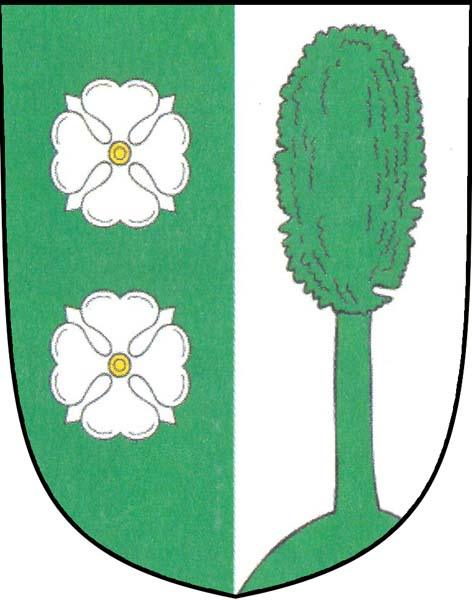
- Flag Coat of arms

- Location in the Czech Republic
- Coordinates: 49°23′8″N 16°25′48″E
- Country: Czech Republic
- Region: South Moravian
- District: Brno-Country
- First mentioned: 1294

Area
  - Total: 4.87 km^{2} (1.88 sq mi)
- Elevation: 298 m (978 ft)

Population (2026-01-01)
  - Total: 344
  - Density: 70.6/km^{2} (183/sq mi)
- Time zone: UTC+1 (CET)
  - Summer (DST): UTC+2 (CEST)
- Postal code: 666 01
- Website: www.serkovice.cz

Šerkovice is a municipality and village in Brno-Country District in the South Moravian Region of the Czech Republic. It has about 300 inhabitants.

Šerkovice lies approximately 25 kilometres (16 mi) north-west of Brno and 165 km (103 mi) south-east of Prague.

== Demographics ==
Historical population
Year	Pop.	±%
1869	221	—
1880	227	+2.7%
1890	211	−7.0%
1900	204	−3.3%
1910	214	+4.9%
1921	185	−13.6%
1930	209	+13.0%
1950	196	−6.2%
1961	207	+5.6%
1970	198	−4.3%
1980	208	+5.1%
1991	182	−12.5%
2001	200	+9.9%
2011	243	+21.5%
2021	349	+43.6%
Source: Censuses
