= Stanoviště =

- Municipality
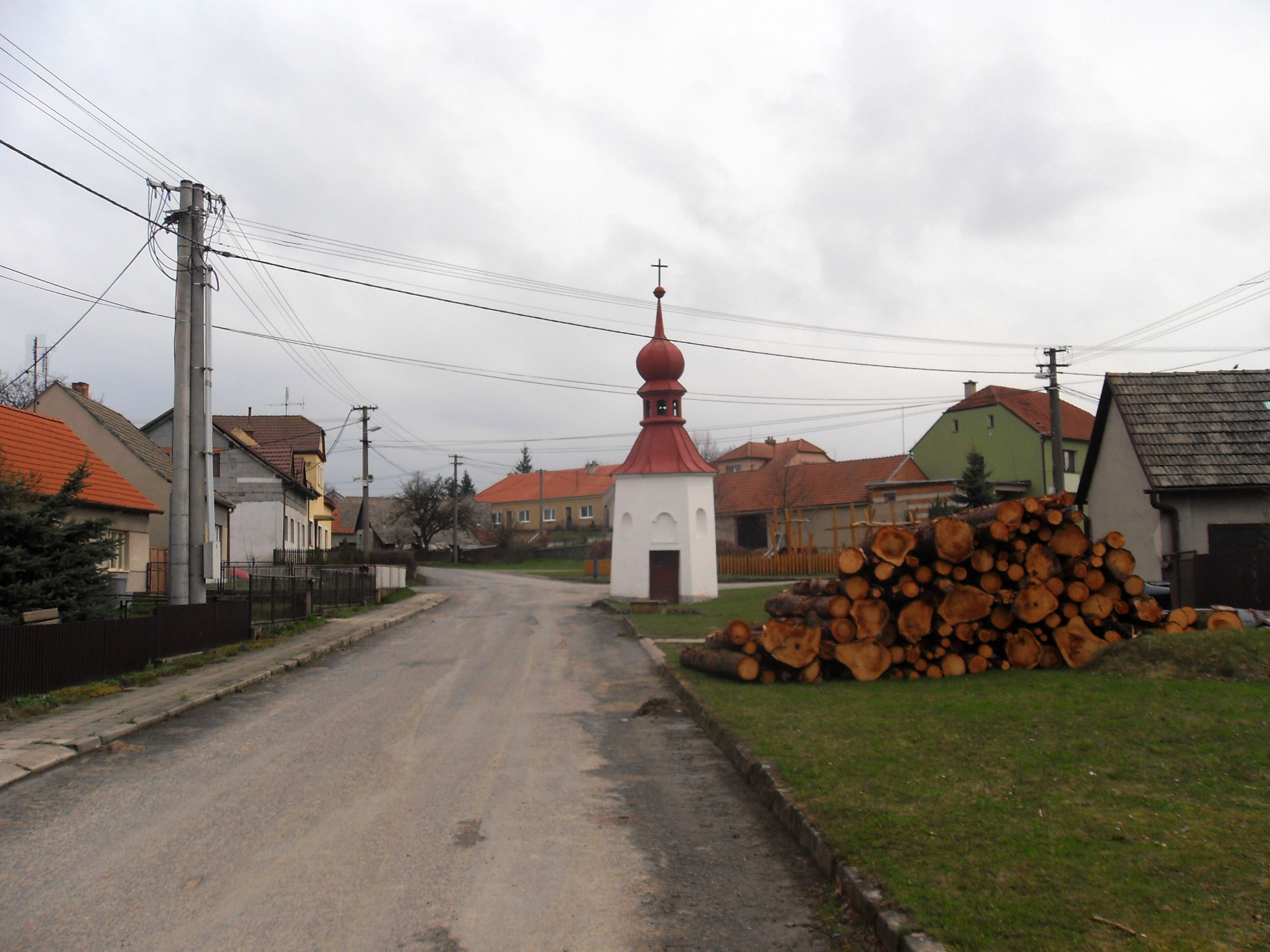
- Centre of Stanoviště

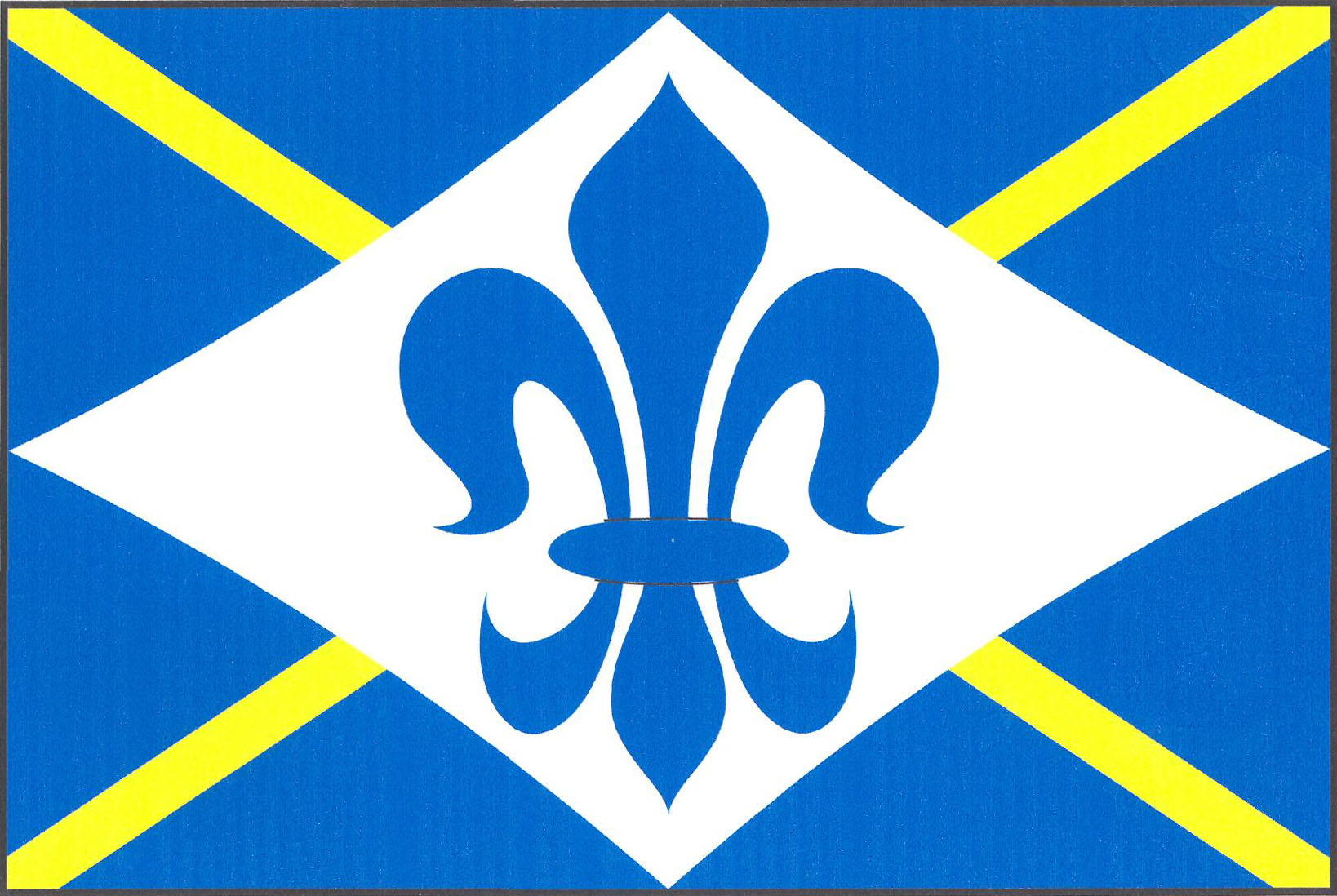
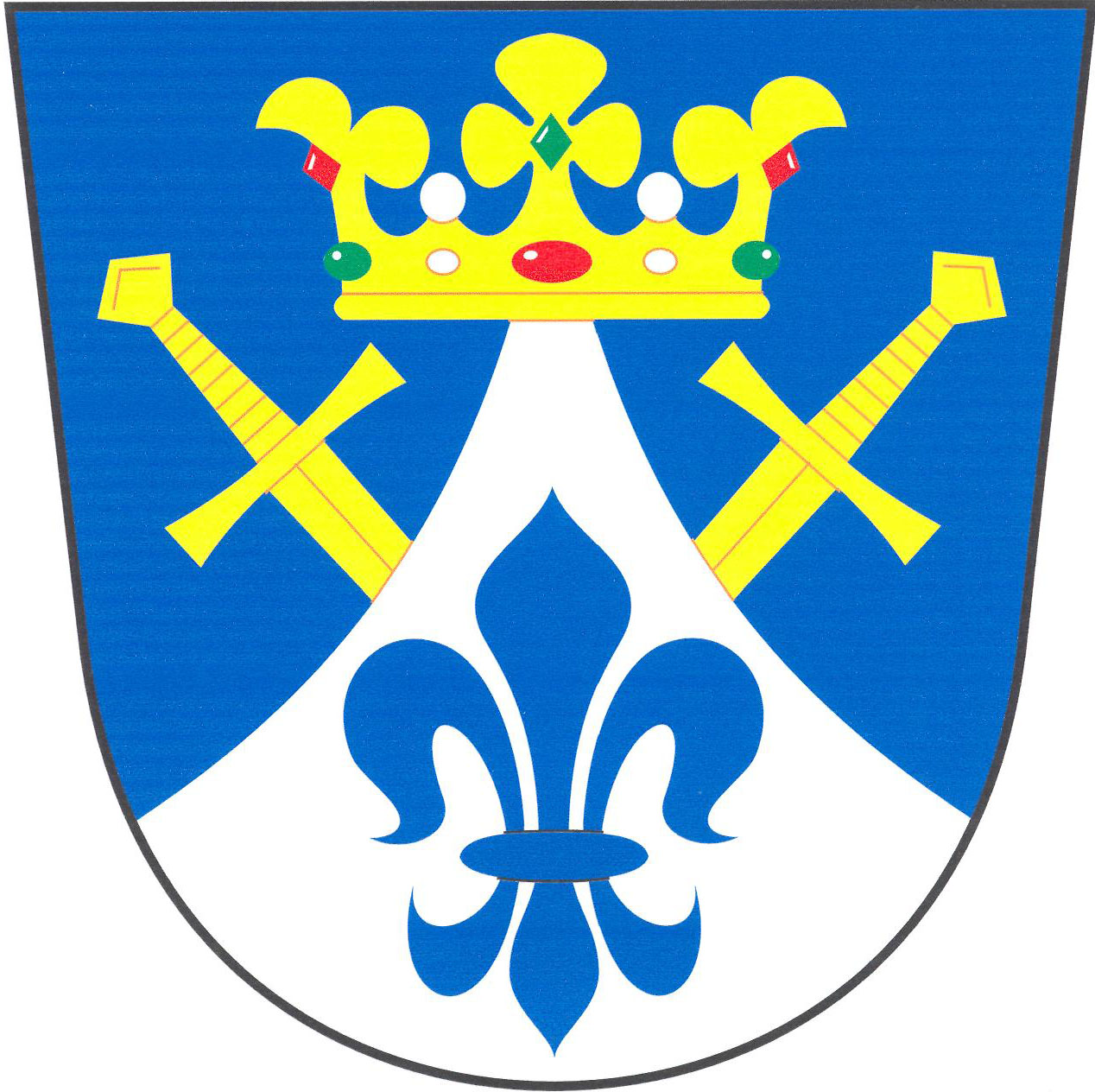
- Flag Coat of arms

- Location in the Czech Republic
- Coordinates: 49°14′21″N 16°15′13″E
- Country: Czech Republic
- Region: South Moravian
- District: Brno-Country
- First mentioned: 1327

Area
  - Total: 4.01 km^{2} (1.55 sq mi)
- Elevation: 505 m (1,657 ft)

Population (2026-01-01)
  - Total: 415
  - Density: 103/km^{2} (268/sq mi)
- Time zone: UTC+1 (CET)
  - Summer (DST): UTC+2 (CEST)
- Postal code: 664 84
- Website: www.stanoviste.cz

Stanoviště is a municipality and village in Brno-Country District in the South Moravian Region of the Czech Republic. It has about 400 inhabitants.

Stanoviště lies approximately 27 kilometres (17 mi) west of Brno and 163 km (101 mi) south-east of Prague.

== Demographics ==
Historical population
Year	Pop.	±%
1869	352	—
1880	371	+5.4%
1890	390	+5.1%
1900	405	+3.8%
1910	418	+3.2%
1921	438	+4.8%
1930	393	−10.3%
1950	372	−5.3%
1961	343	−7.8%
1970	347	+1.2%
1980	345	−0.6%
1991	329	−4.6%
2001	329	+0.0%
2011	363	+10.3%
2021	388	+6.9%
Source: Censuses
