= Rašov =

- Municipality
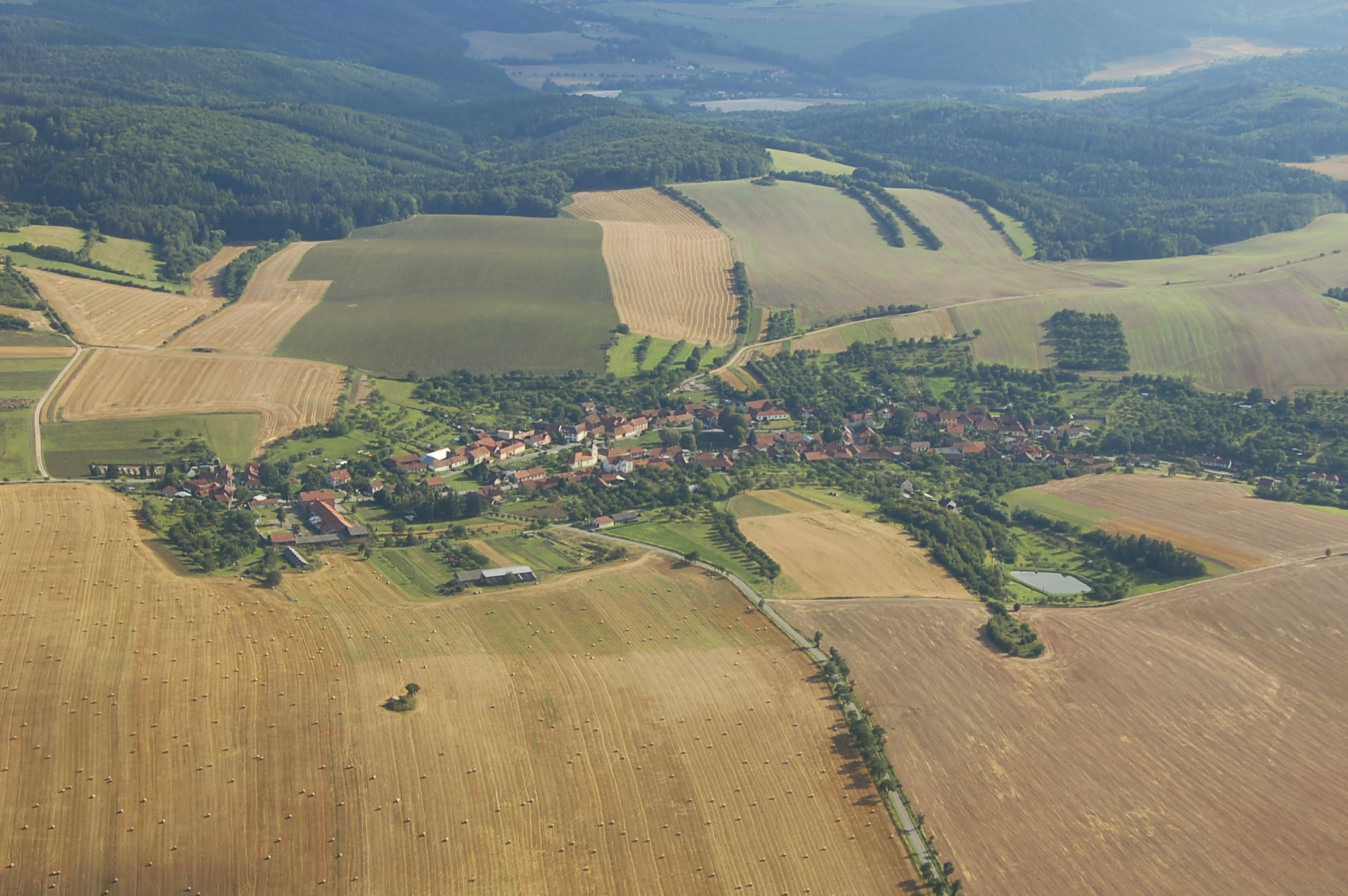
- Aerial view

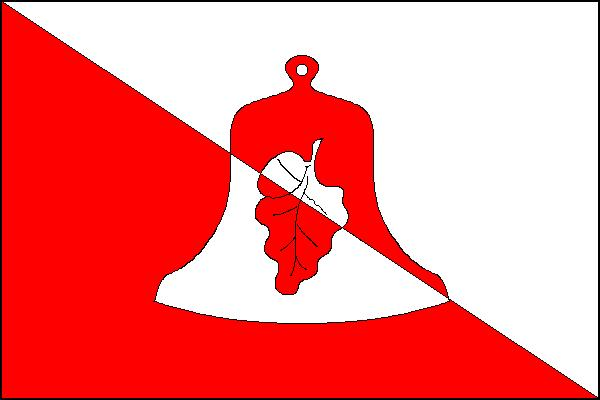
- Flag Coat of arms

- Location in the Czech Republic
- Coordinates: 49°24′56″N 16°27′14″E
- Country: Czech Republic
- Region: South Moravian
- District: Brno-Country
- First mentioned: 1390

Area
  - Total: 9.57 km^{2} (3.69 sq mi)
- Elevation: 510 m (1,670 ft)

Population (2026-01-01)
  - Total: 246
  - Density: 25.7/km^{2} (66.6/sq mi)
- Time zone: UTC+1 (CET)
  - Summer (DST): UTC+2 (CEST)
- Postal code: 679 23
- Website: rasov.cz

Rašov (German: Raschau) is a municipality and village in Brno-Country District in the South Moravian Region of the Czech Republic. It has about 200 inhabitants.

Rašov lies approximately 27 kilometres (17 mi) north-west of Brno and 165 km (103 mi) south-east of Prague.

== Demographics ==
Historical population
Year	Pop.	±%
1869	440	—
1880	454	+3.2%
1890	431	−5.1%
1900	434	+0.7%
1910	407	−6.2%
1921	387	−4.9%
1930	378	−2.3%
1950	365	−3.4%
1961	360	−1.4%
1970	315	−12.5%
1980	287	−8.9%
1991	227	−20.9%
2001	222	−2.2%
2011	225	+1.4%
2021	248	+10.2%
Source: Censuses
