= Vratislávka =

- Municipality
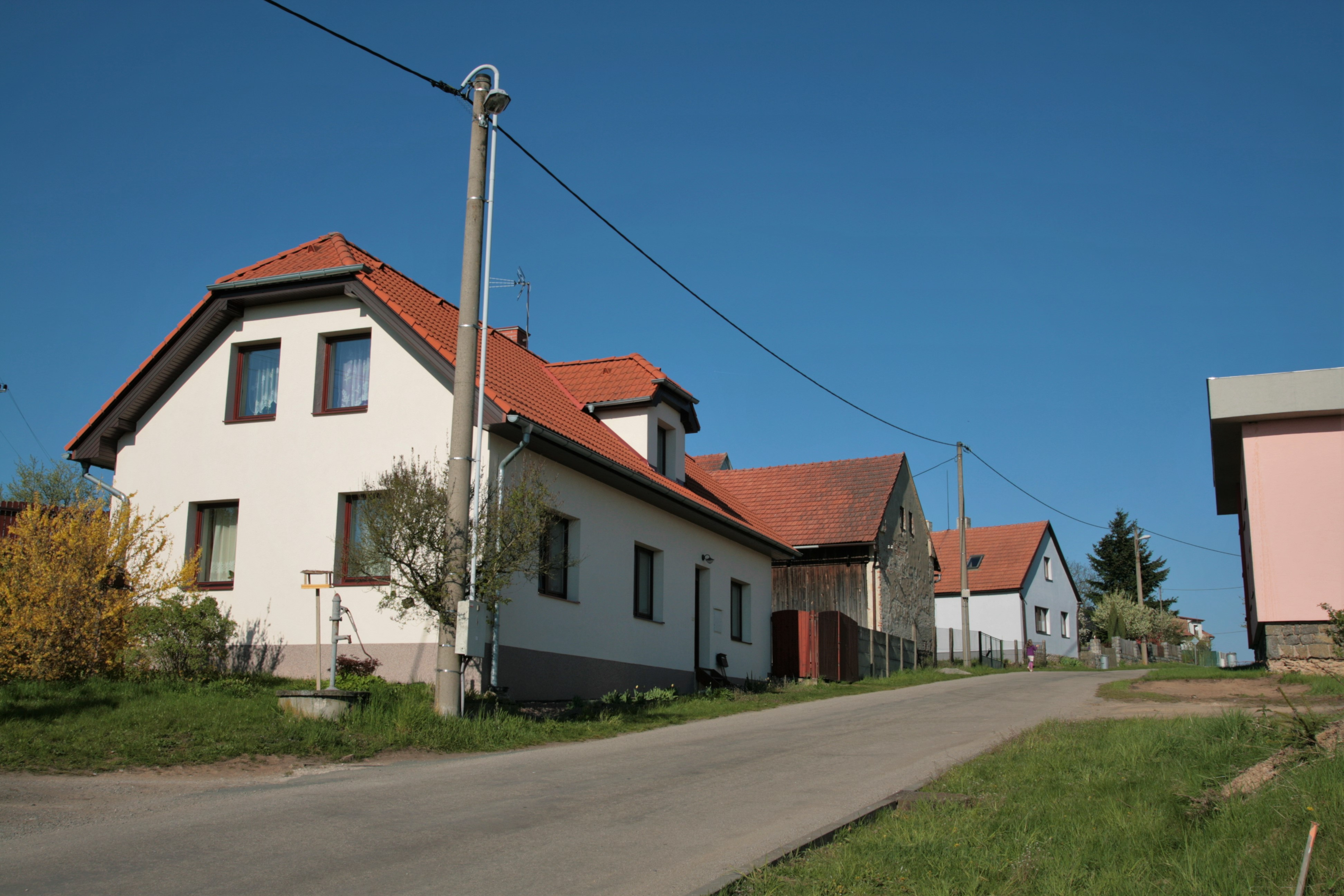
- A street in Vratislávka

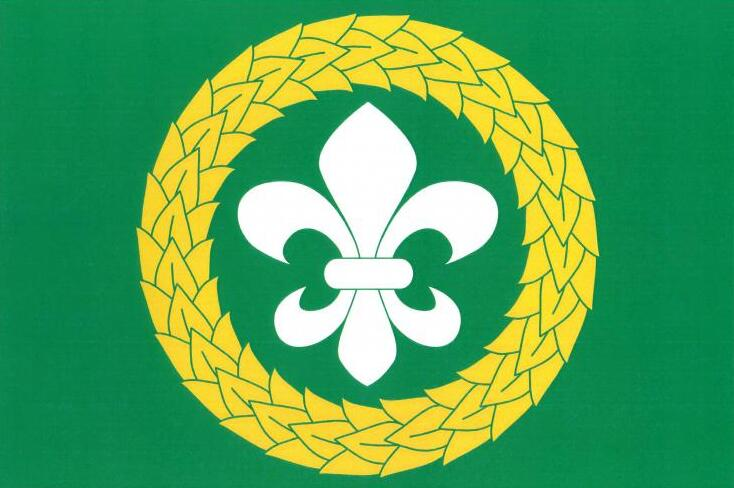
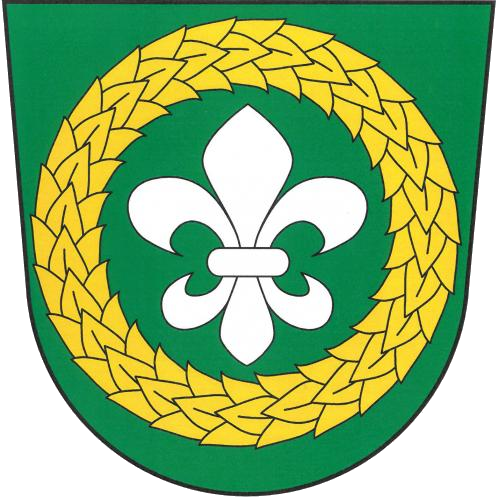
- Flag Coat of arms

- Location in the Czech Republic
- Coordinates: 49°23′11″N 16°14′39″E
- Country: Czech Republic
- Region: South Moravian
- District: Brno-Country
- First mentioned: 1358

Area
  - Total: 3.50 km^{2} (1.35 sq mi)
- Elevation: 544 m (1,785 ft)

Population (2026-01-01)
  - Total: 87
  - Density: 25/km^{2} (64/sq mi)
- Time zone: UTC+1 (CET)
  - Summer (DST): UTC+2 (CEST)
- Postal code: 594 51
- Website: www.obecvratislavka.cz

Vratislávka is a municipality and village in Brno-Country District in the South Moravian Region of the Czech Republic. It has about 90 inhabitants.

Vratislávka lies approximately 35 kilometres (22 mi) north-west of Brno and 153 km (95 mi) south-east of Prague.

== Demographics ==
Historical population
Year	Pop.	±%
1869	252	—
1880	305	+21.0%
1890	280	−8.2%
1900	267	−4.6%
1910	256	−4.1%
1921	248	−3.1%
1930	249	+0.4%
1950	176	−29.3%
1961	153	−13.1%
1970	124	−19.0%
1980	120	−3.2%
1991	90	−25.0%
2001	77	−14.4%
2011	86	+11.7%
2021	85	−1.2%
Source: Censuses
