= Řikonín =

- Municipality
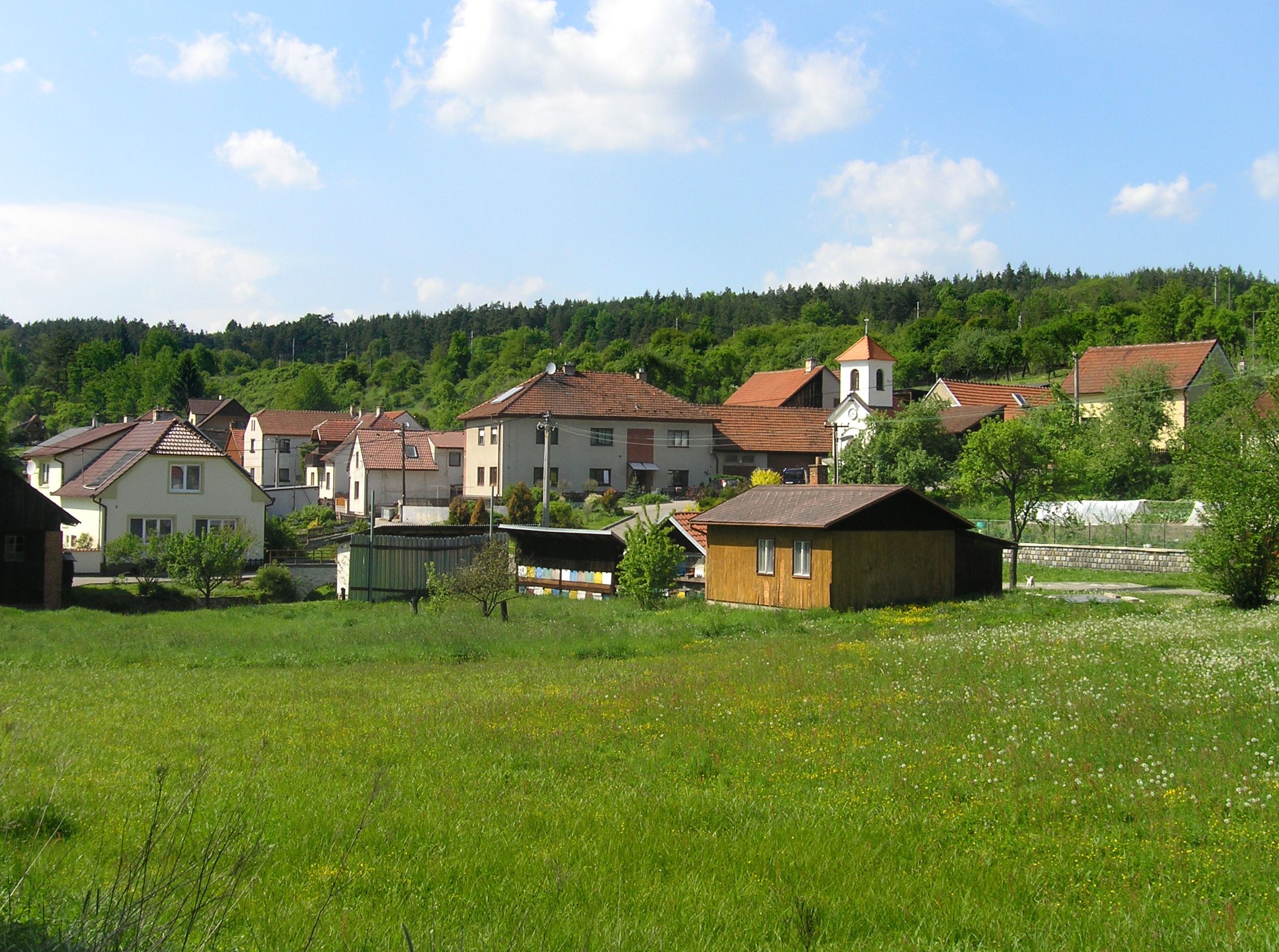
- View from the south

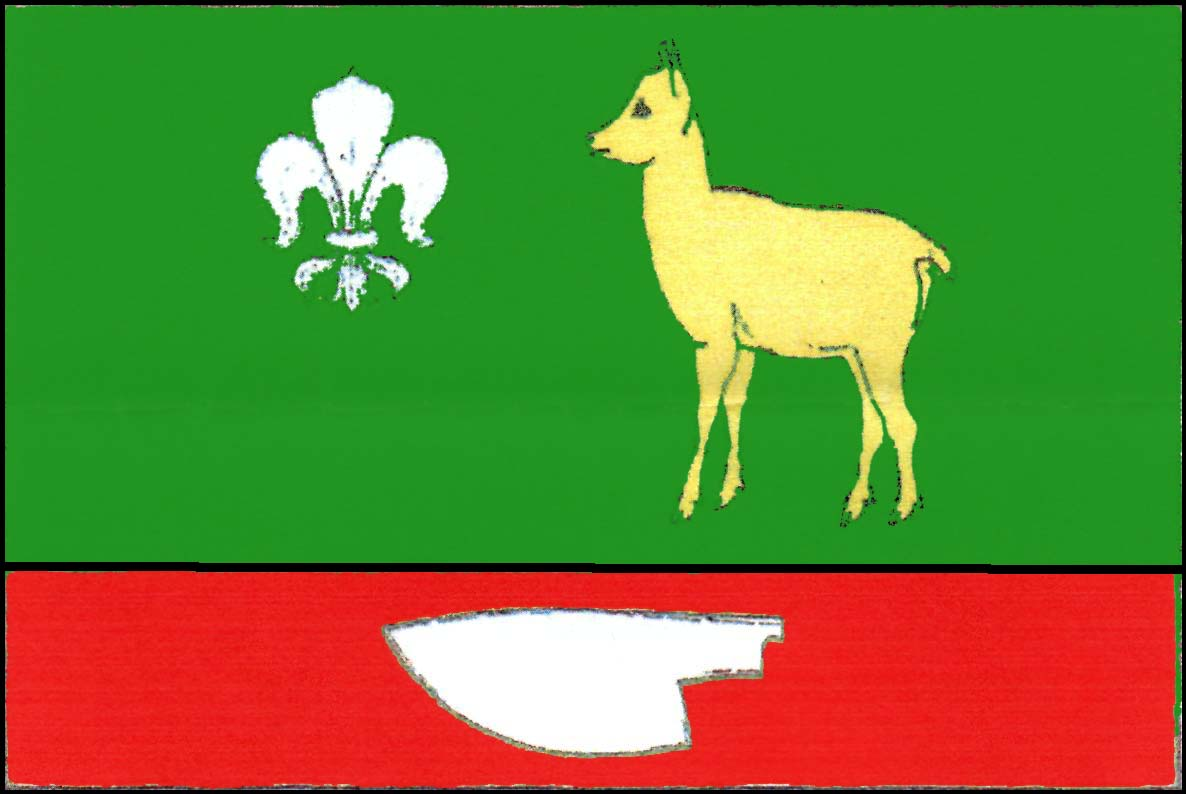
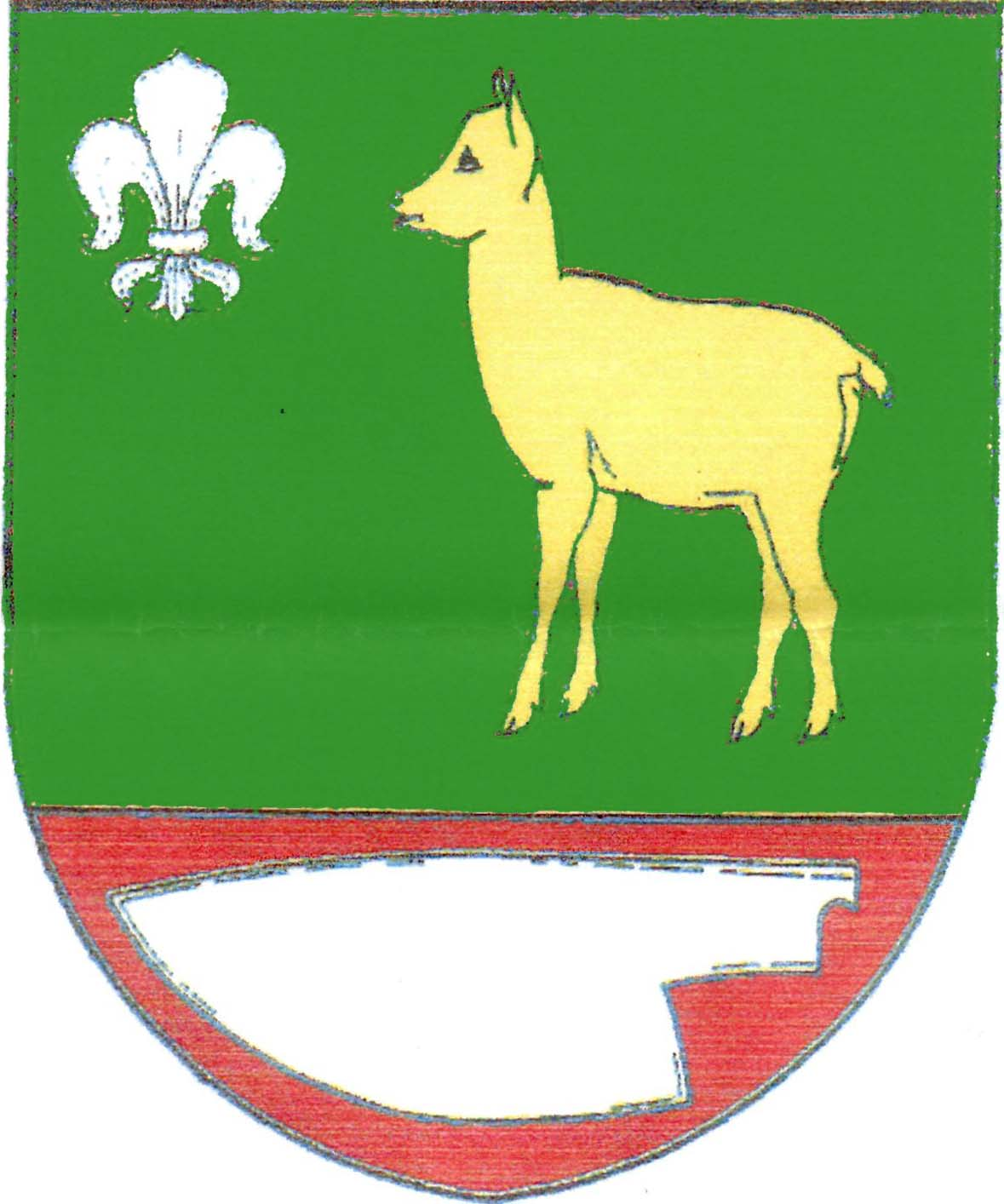
- Flag Coat of arms

- Location in the Czech Republic
- Coordinates: 49°21′52″N 16°18′21″E
- Country: Czech Republic
- Region: South Moravian
- District: Brno-Country
- First mentioned: 1365

Area
  - Total: 2.59 km^{2} (1.00 sq mi)
- Elevation: 355 m (1,165 ft)

Population (2026-01-01)
  - Total: 59
  - Density: 23/km^{2} (59/sq mi)
- Time zone: UTC+1 (CET)
  - Summer (DST): UTC+2 (CEST)
- Postal code: 594 51
- Website: www.rikonin.cz

Řikonín is a municipality and village in Brno-Country District in the South Moravian Region of the Czech Republic. It has about 60 inhabitants.

Řikonín lies approximately 29 kilometres (18 mi) north-west of Brno and 158 km (98 mi) south-east of Prague.

== Demographics ==
Historical population
Year	Pop.	±%
1869	111	—
1880	108	−2.7%
1890	98	−9.3%
1900	91	−7.1%
1910	80	−12.1%
1921	75	−6.2%
1930	75	+0.0%
1950	63	−16.0%
1961	63	+0.0%
1970	52	−17.5%
1980	43	−17.3%
1991	42	−2.3%
2001	41	−2.4%
2011	35	−14.6%
2021	52	+48.6%
Source: Censuses
