= Kuřimská Nová Ves =

- Municipality
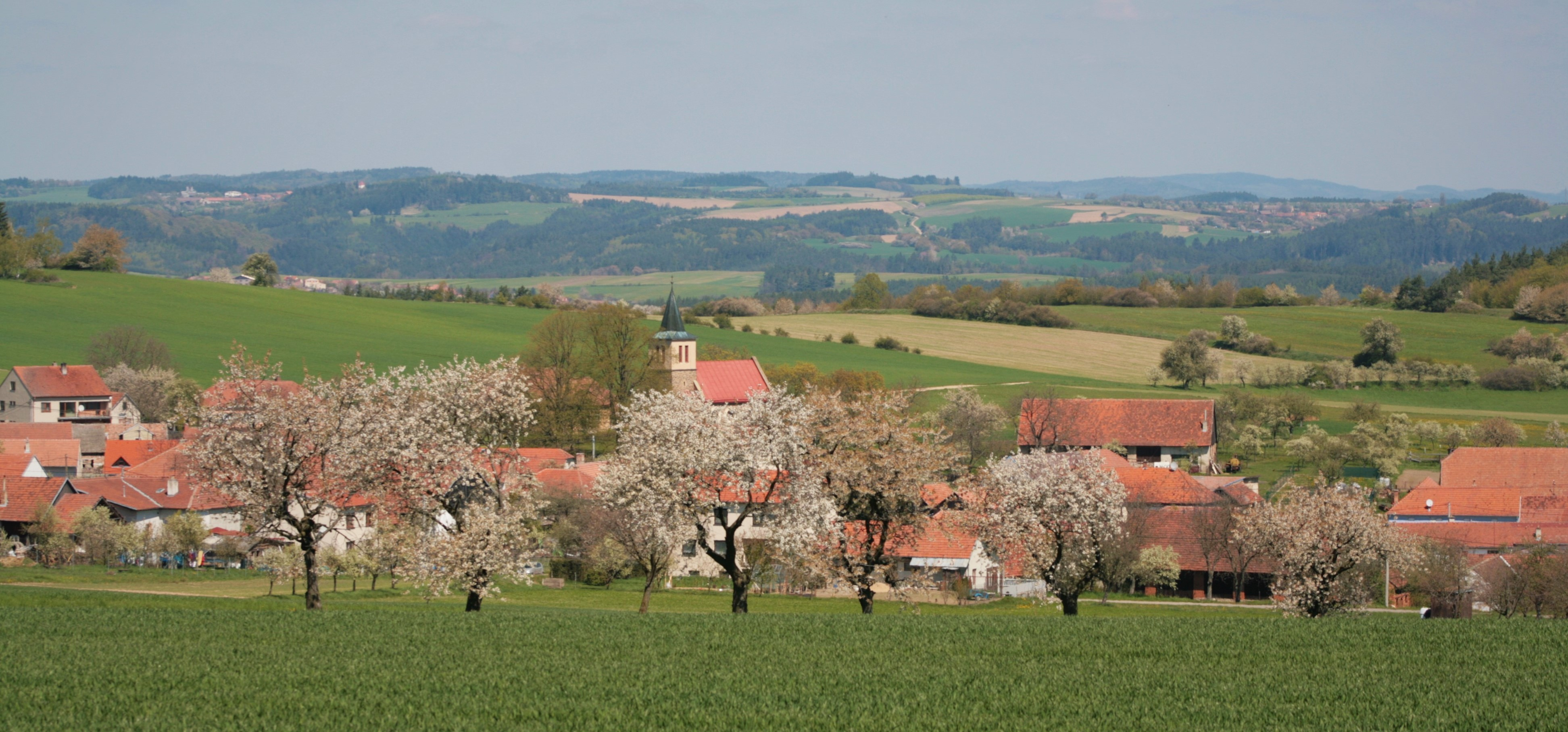
- View from the south

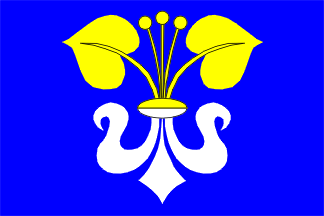
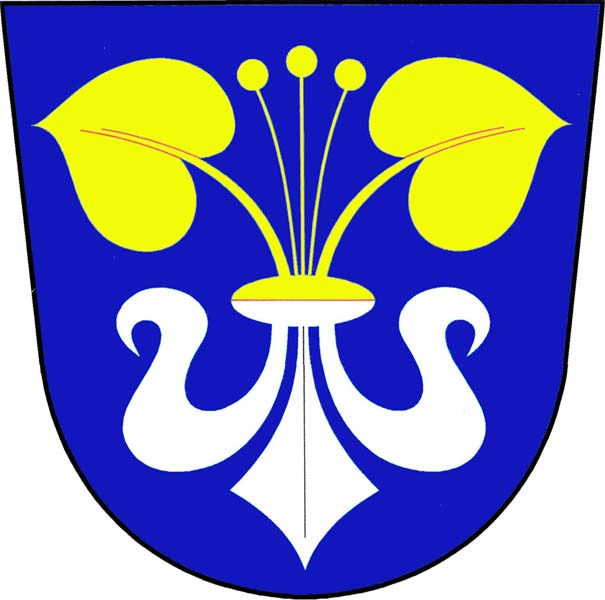
- Flag Coat of arms

- Location in the Czech Republic
- Coordinates: 49°20′44″N 16°17′49″E
- Country: Czech Republic
- Region: South Moravian
- District: Brno-Country
- First mentioned: 1364

Area
  - Total: 4.88 km^{2} (1.88 sq mi)
- Elevation: 457 m (1,499 ft)

Population (2026-01-01)
  - Total: 159
  - Density: 32.6/km^{2} (84.4/sq mi)
- Time zone: UTC+1 (CET)
  - Summer (DST): UTC+2 (CEST)
- Postal code: 594 55
- Website: www.kurimskanovaves.cz

Kuřimská Nová Ves is a municipality and village in Brno-Country District in the South Moravian Region of the Czech Republic. It has about 200 inhabitants.

Kuřimská Nová Ves lies approximately 29 kilometres (18 mi) north-west of Brno and 158 km (98 mi) south-east of Prague.

== Administrative division ==
Kuřimská Nová Ves consists of two municipal parts (in brackets population according to the 2021 census):

- Kuřimská Nová Ves (126)
- Prosatín (12)

== Demographics ==
Historical population
Year	Pop.	±%
1869	233	—
1880	289	+24.0%
1890	295	+2.1%
1900	289	−2.0%
1910	259	−10.4%
1921	242	−6.6%
1930	240	−0.8%
1950	270	+12.5%
1961	244	−9.6%
1970	204	−16.4%
1980	156	−23.5%
1991	145	−7.1%
2001	127	−12.4%
2011	132	+3.9%
2021	138	+4.5%
Source: Censuses
