= Strhaře =

- Municipality
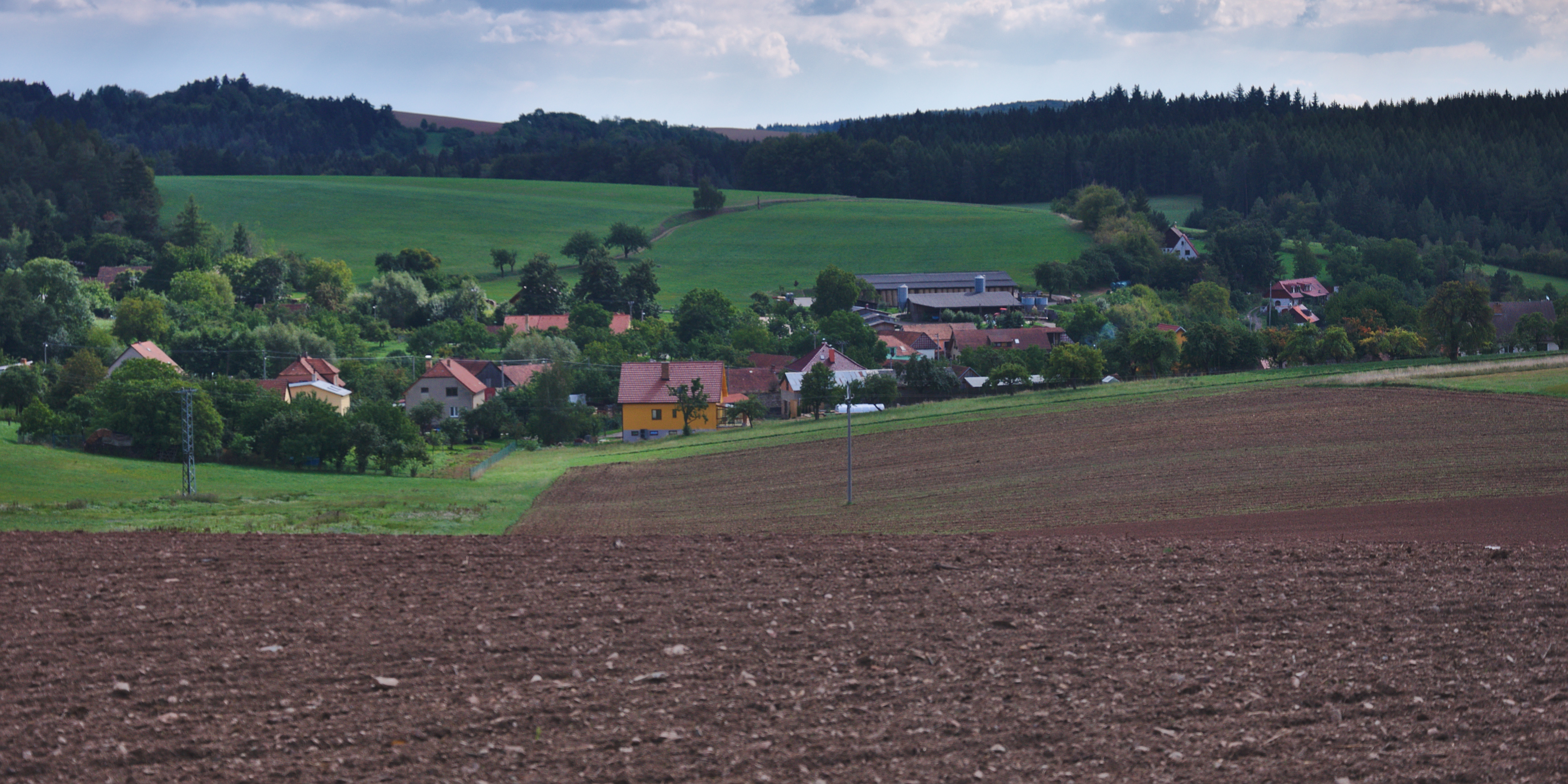
- View from the west

- Location in the Czech Republic
- Coordinates: 49°26′8″N 16°26′11″E
- Country: Czech Republic
- Region: South Moravian
- District: Brno-Country
- First mentioned: 1390

Area
  - Total: 5.34 km^{2} (2.06 sq mi)
- Elevation: 498 m (1,634 ft)

Population (2026-01-01)
  - Total: 146
  - Density: 27.3/km^{2} (70.8/sq mi)
- Time zone: UTC+1 (CET)
  - Summer (DST): UTC+2 (CEST)
- Postal code: 679 23
- Website: www.strhare.cz

Strhaře is a municipality and village in Brno-Country District in the South Moravian Region of the Czech Republic. It has about 100 inhabitants.

Strhaře lies approximately 30 kilometres (19 mi) north-west of Brno and 163 km (101 mi) south-east of Prague.

== Administrative division ==
Strhaře consists of two municipal parts (in brackets population according to the 2021 census):

- Strhaře (103)
- Žleby (31)

== Demographics ==
Historical population
Year	Pop.	±%
1869	265	—
1880	278	+4.9%
1890	274	−1.4%
1900	299	+9.1%
1910	309	+3.3%
1921	310	+0.3%
1930	302	−2.6%
1950	239	−20.9%
1961	225	−5.9%
1970	200	−11.1%
1980	179	−10.5%
1991	149	−16.8%
2001	139	−6.7%
2011	123	−11.5%
2021	134	+8.9%
Source: Censuses
