= Trboušany =

- Municipality
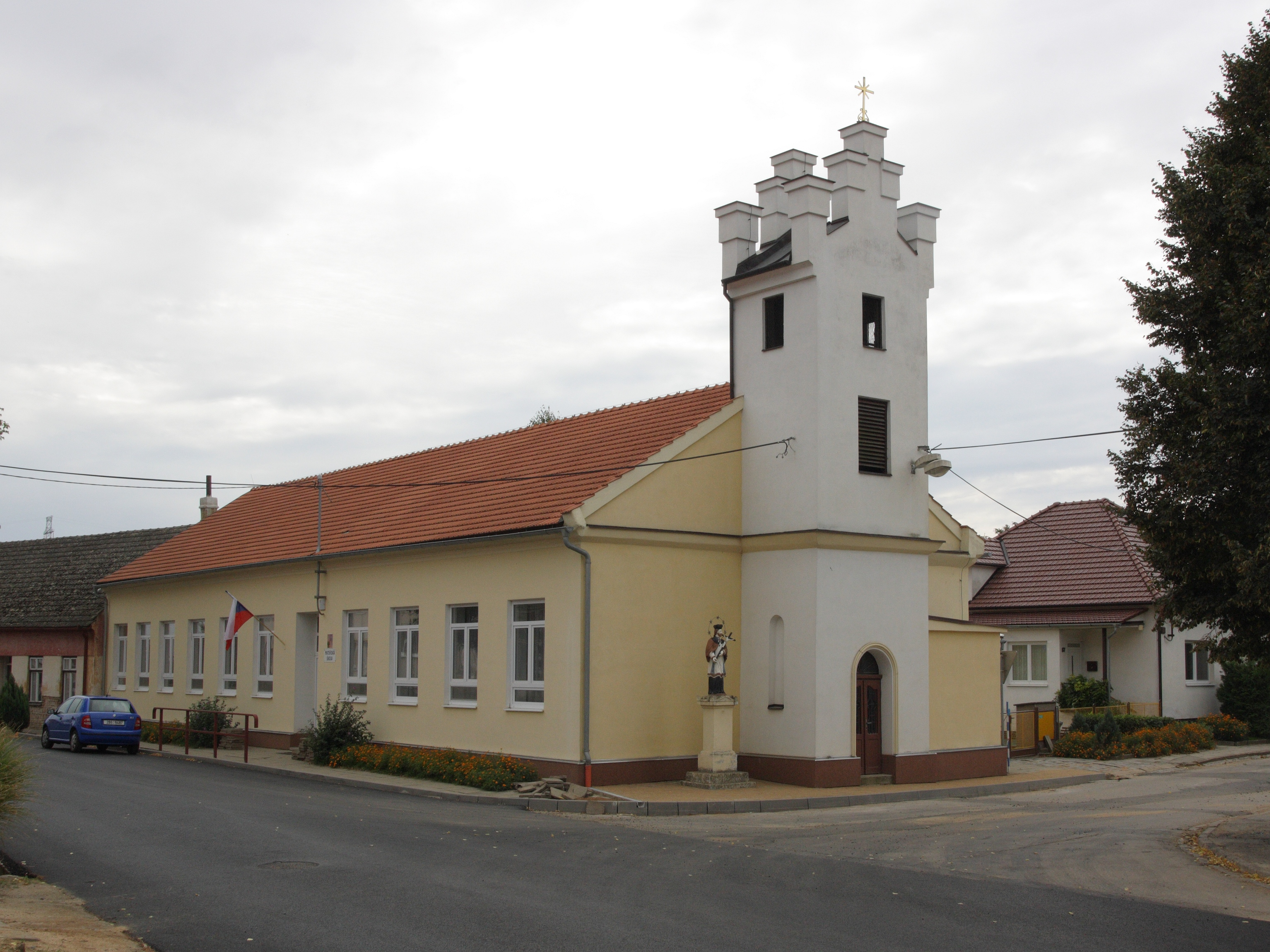
- Belfry and kindergarten

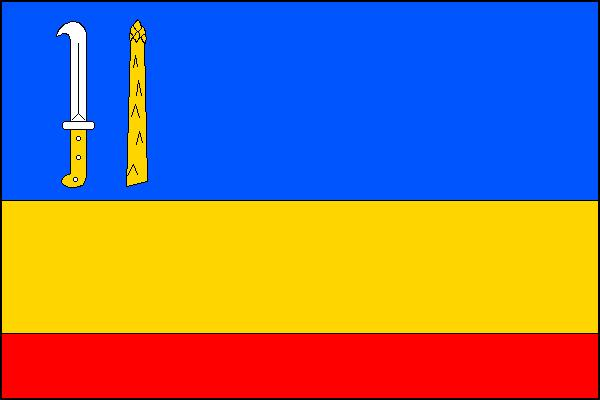
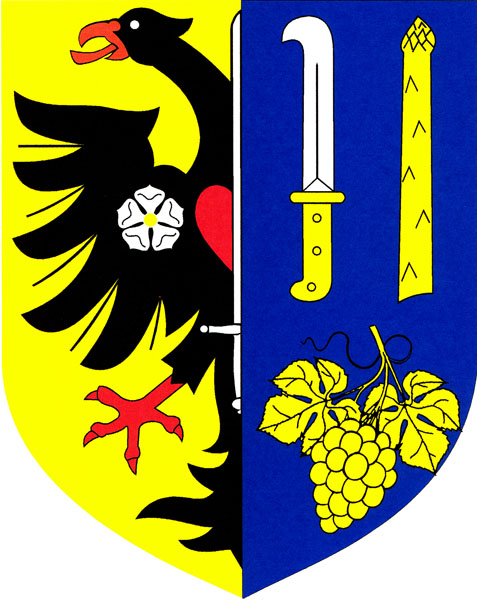
- Flag Coat of arms

- Location in the Czech Republic
- Coordinates: 49°3′3″N 16°27′46″E
- Country: Czech Republic
- Region: South Moravian
- District: Brno-Country
- First mentioned: 1537

Area
  - Total: 5.54 km^{2} (2.14 sq mi)
- Elevation: 187 m (614 ft)

Population (2026-01-01)
  - Total: 389
  - Density: 70.2/km^{2} (182/sq mi)
- Time zone: UTC+1 (CET)
  - Summer (DST): UTC+2 (CEST)
- Postal code: 664 64
- Website: www.trbousany.cz

Trboušany (German: Pausche) is a municipality and village in Brno-Country District in the South Moravian Region of the Czech Republic. It has about 400 inhabitants.

Trboušany lies approximately 21 kilometres (13 mi) south-west of Brno and 187 km (116 mi) south-east of Prague.

== Demographics ==
Historical population
Year	Pop.	±%
1869	358	—
1880	348	−2.8%
1890	374	+7.5%
1900	404	+8.0%
1910	464	+14.9%
1921	465	+0.2%
1930	450	−3.2%
1950	391	−13.1%
1961	439	+12.3%
1970	418	−4.8%
1980	384	−8.1%
1991	359	−6.5%
2001	355	−1.1%
2011	339	−4.5%
2021	384	+13.3%
Source: Censuses
