= Zakřany =

- Municipality
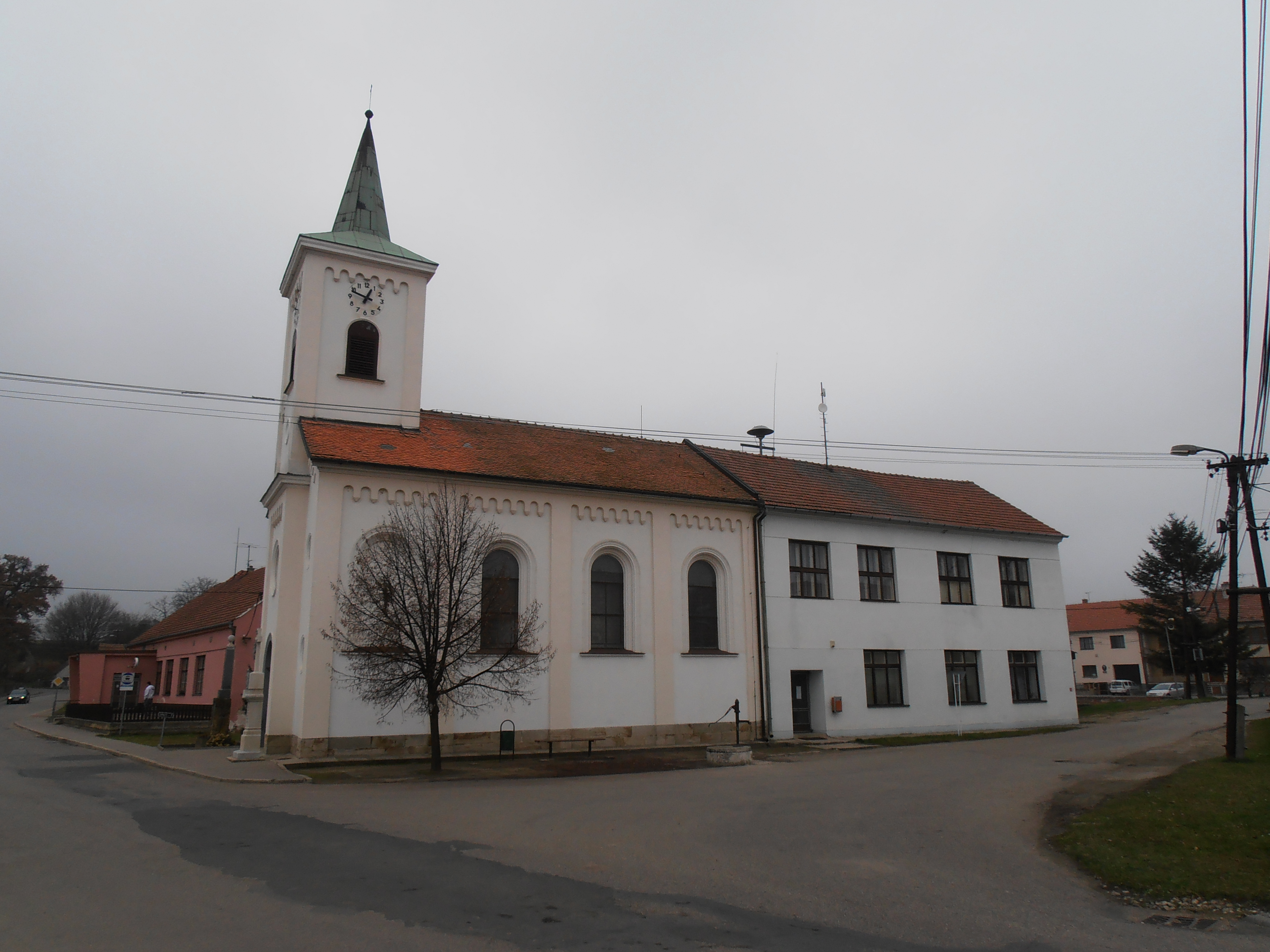
- Chapel of Saint Donatus

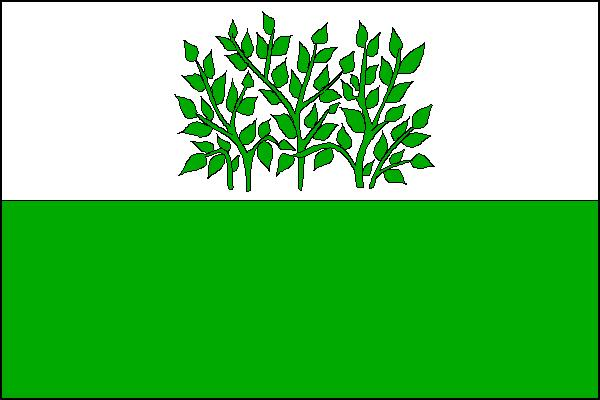
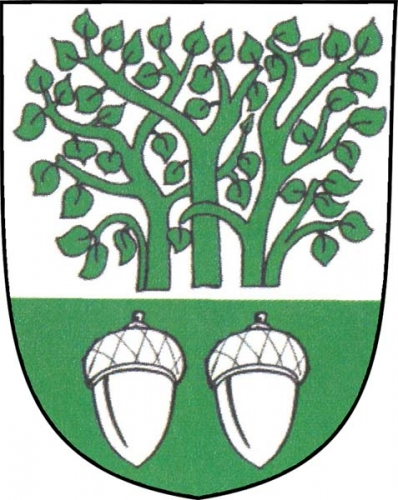
- Flag Coat of arms

- Location in the Czech Republic
- Coordinates: 49°10′14″N 16°19′31″E
- Country: Czech Republic
- Region: South Moravian
- District: Brno-Country
- First mentioned: 1350

Area
  - Total: 5.15 km^{2} (1.99 sq mi)
- Elevation: 380 m (1,250 ft)

Population (2026-01-01)
  - Total: 817
  - Density: 159/km^{2} (411/sq mi)
- Time zone: UTC+1 (CET)
  - Summer (DST): UTC+2 (CEST)
- Postal codes: 664 84
- Website: zakrany.cz

Zakřany is a municipality and village in Brno-Country District in the South Moravian Region of the Czech Republic. It has about 800 inhabitants.

Zakřany lies approximately 22 kilometres (14 mi) west of Brno and 171 km (106 mi) south-east of Prague.

== Demographics ==
Historical population
Year	Pop.	±%
1869	592	—
1880	673	+13.7%
1890	747	+11.0%
1900	917	+22.8%
1910	968	+5.6%
1921	965	−0.3%
1930	1,006	+4.2%
1950	926	−8.0%
1961	903	−2.5%
1970	867	−4.0%
1980	795	−8.3%
1991	767	−3.5%
2001	736	−4.0%
2011	737	+0.1%
2021	765	+3.8%
Source: Censuses
