= Níhov =

- Municipality
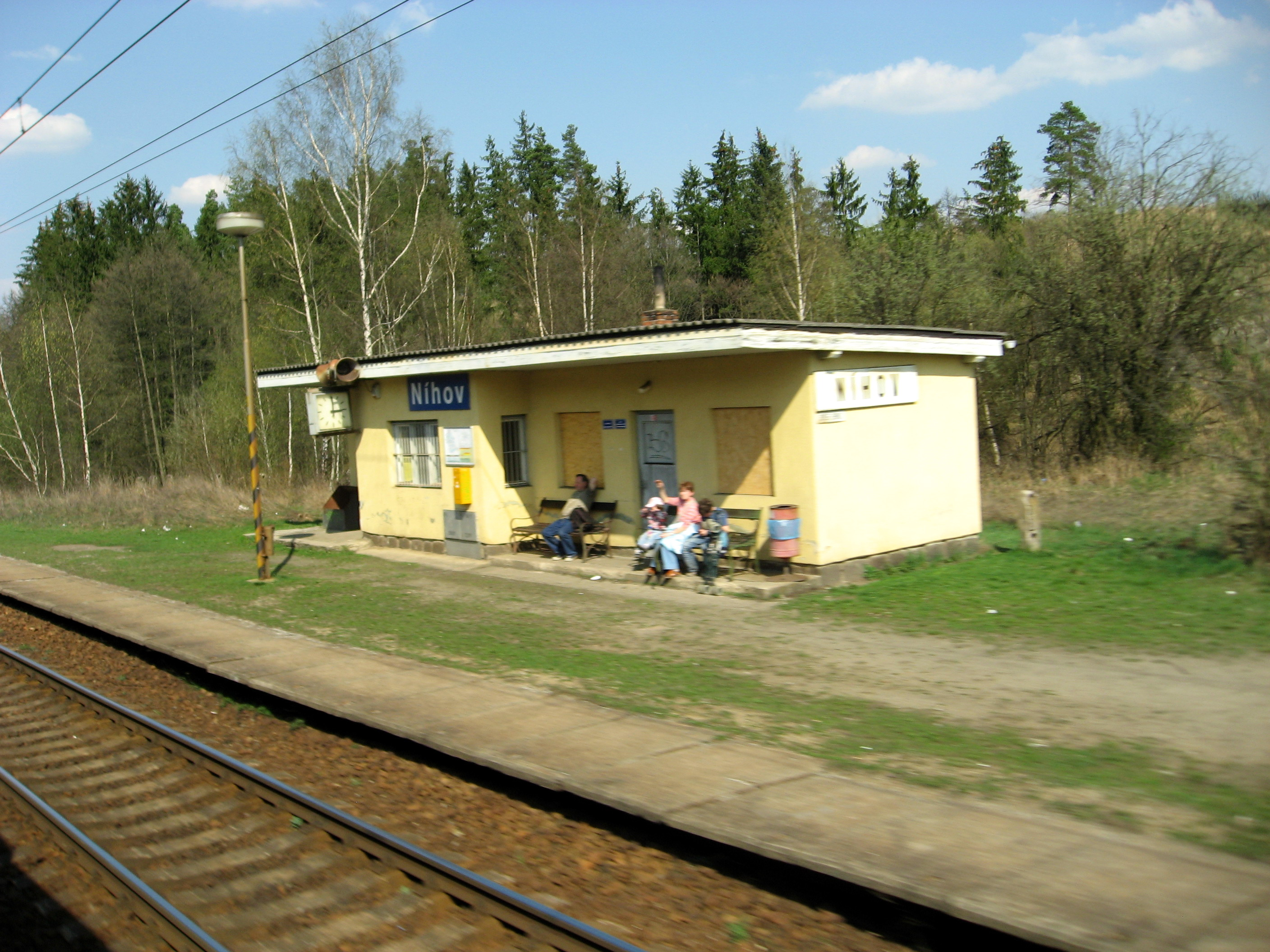
- Railway station

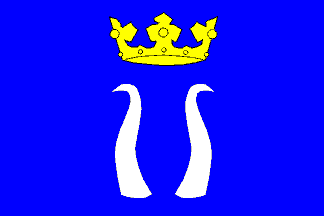
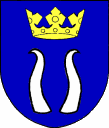
- Flag Coat of arms

- Location in the Czech Republic
- Coordinates: 49°20′30″N 16°15′27″E
- Country: Czech Republic
- Region: South Moravian
- District: Brno-Country
- First mentioned: 1349

Area
  - Total: 4.94 km^{2} (1.91 sq mi)
- Elevation: 474 m (1,555 ft)

Population (2026-01-01)
  - Total: 256
  - Density: 51.8/km^{2} (134/sq mi)
- Time zone: UTC+1 (CET)
  - Summer (DST): UTC+2 (CEST)
- Postal code: 594 55
- Website: www.nihov.cz

Níhov is a municipality and village in Brno-Country District in the South Moravian Region of the Czech Republic. It has about 300 inhabitants.

Níhov lies approximately 31 kilometres (19 mi) north-west of Brno and 156 km (97 mi) south-east of Prague.

== Demographics ==
Historical population
Year	Pop.	±%
1869	288	—
1880	291	+1.0%
1890	269	−7.6%
1900	290	+7.8%
1910	249	−14.1%
1921	242	−2.8%
1930	244	+0.8%
1950	180	−26.2%
1961	249	+38.3%
1970	255	+2.4%
1980	232	−9.0%
1991	184	−20.7%
2001	206	+12.0%
2011	206	+0.0%
2021	244	+18.4%
Source: Censuses
