= Úsuší =

- Municipality
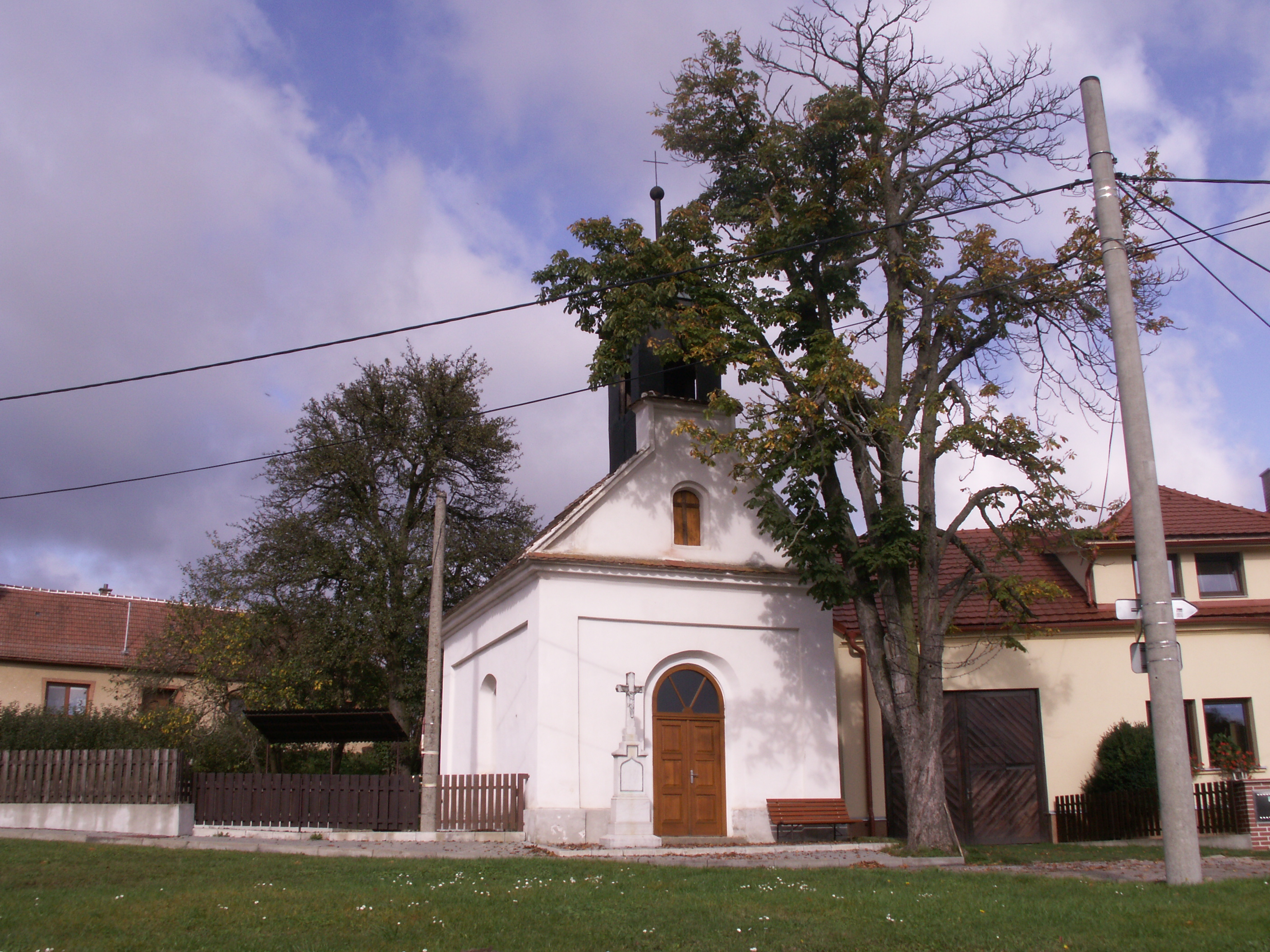
- Chapel of the Assumption of the Virgin Mary

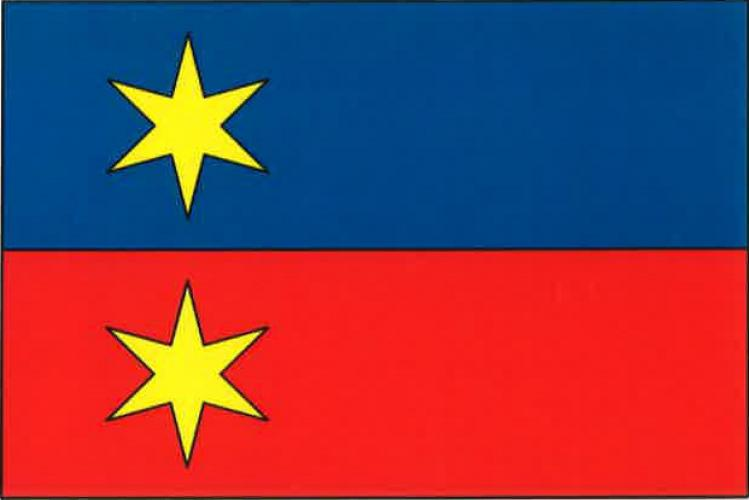
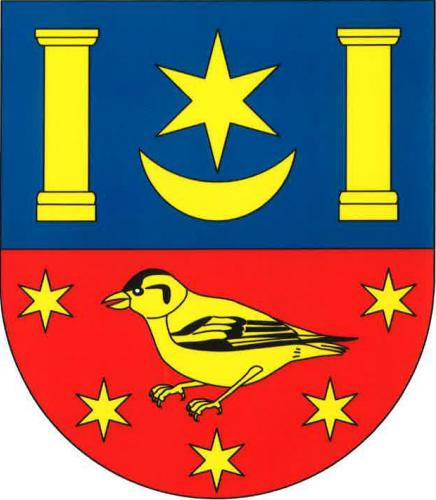
- Flag Coat of arms

- Location in the Czech Republic
- Coordinates: 49°20′5″N 16°21′22″E
- Country: Czech Republic
- Region: South Moravian
- District: Brno-Country
- First mentioned: 1485

Area
  - Total: 2.85 km^{2} (1.10 sq mi)
- Elevation: 444 m (1,457 ft)

Population (2026-01-01)
  - Total: 122
  - Density: 42.8/km^{2} (111/sq mi)
- Time zone: UTC+1 (CET)
  - Summer (DST): UTC+2 (CEST)
- Postal code: 666 01
- Website: ususi.cz

Úsuší is a municipality and village in Brno-Country District in the South Moravian Region of the Czech Republic. It has about 100 inhabitants.

Úsuší lies approximately 25 kilometres (16 mi) north-west of Brno and 163 km (101 mi) south-east of Prague.

== Administrative division ==
Úsuší consists of two municipal parts (in brackets population according to the 2021 census):

- Úsuší (65)
- Čížky (58)

== Demographics ==
Historical population
Year	Pop.	±%
1869	237	—
1880	250	+5.5%
1890	195	−22.0%
1900	206	+5.6%
1910	196	−4.9%
1921	187	−4.6%
1930	218	+16.6%
1950	176	−19.3%
1961	169	−4.0%
1970	150	−11.2%
1980	152	+1.3%
1991	136	−10.5%
2001	114	−16.2%
2011	143	+25.4%
2021	123	−14.0%
Source: Censuses
