= Ochoz u Tišnova =

- Municipality
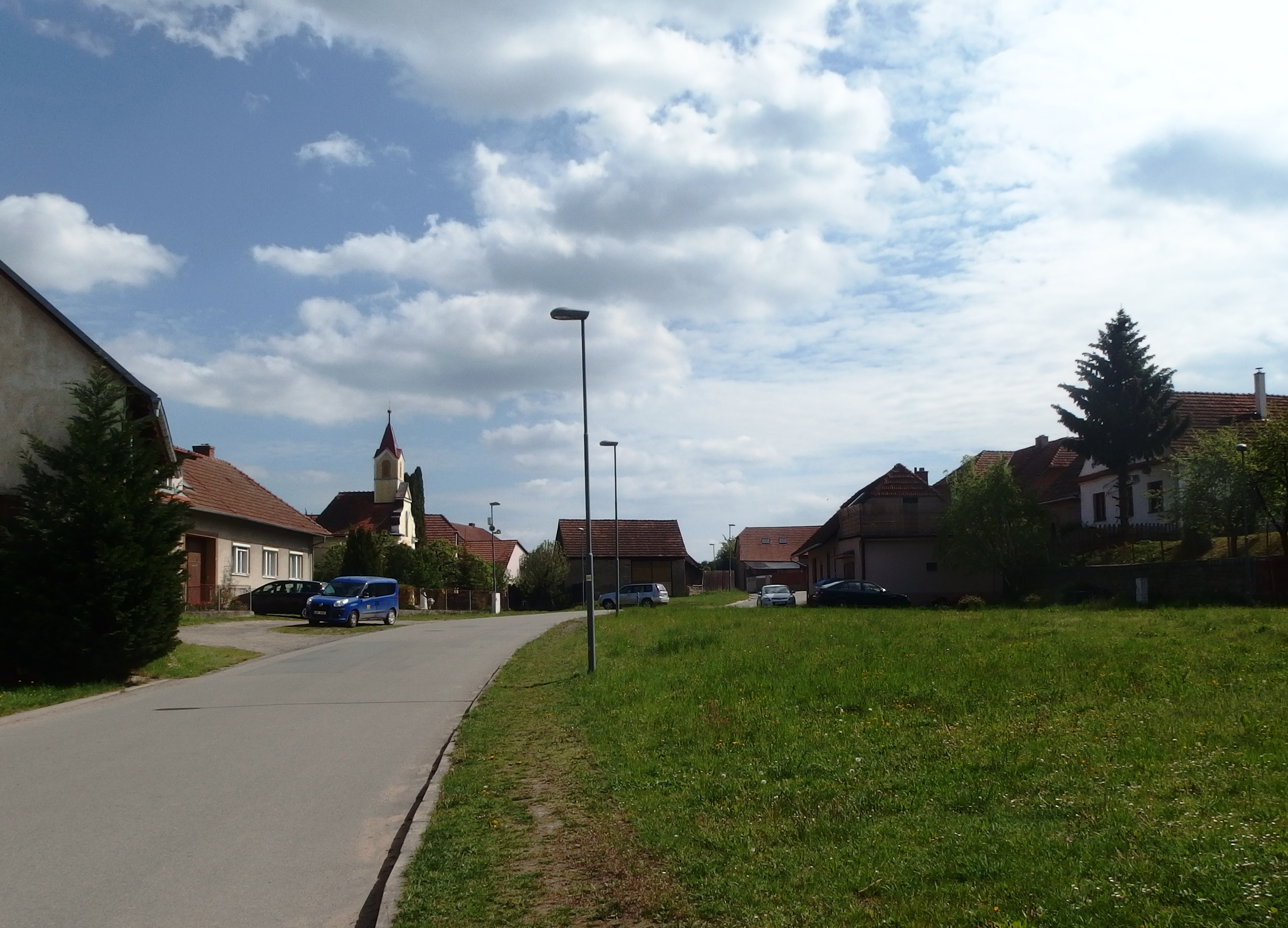
- Centre of Ochoz u Tišnova

- Location in the Czech Republic
- Coordinates: 49°25′32″N 16°23′39″E
- Country: Czech Republic
- Region: South Moravian
- District: Brno-Country
- First mentioned: 1390

Area
  - Total: 3.80 km^{2} (1.47 sq mi)
- Elevation: 447 m (1,467 ft)

Population (2026-01-01)
  - Total: 111
  - Density: 29.2/km^{2} (75.7/sq mi)
- Time zone: UTC+1 (CET)
  - Summer (DST): UTC+2 (CEST)
- Postal code: 679 23
- Website: www.ochozutisnova.cz

Ochoz u Tišnova is a municipality and village in Brno-Country District in the South Moravian Region of the Czech Republic. It has about 100 inhabitants.

Ochoz u Tišnova lies approximately 31 kilometres (19 mi) north-west of Brno and 160 km (99 mi) south-east of Prague.

== Demographics ==
Historical population
Year	Pop.	±%
1869	240	—
1880	222	−7.5%
1890	227	+2.3%
1900	201	−11.5%
1910	196	−2.5%
1921	187	−4.6%
1930	196	+4.8%
1950	187	−4.6%
1961	141	−24.6%
1970	134	−5.0%
1980	122	−9.0%
1991	110	−9.8%
2001	115	+4.5%
2011	117	+1.7%
2021	116	−0.9%
Source: Censuses
