= Kaly (Brno-Country District) =

- Municipality
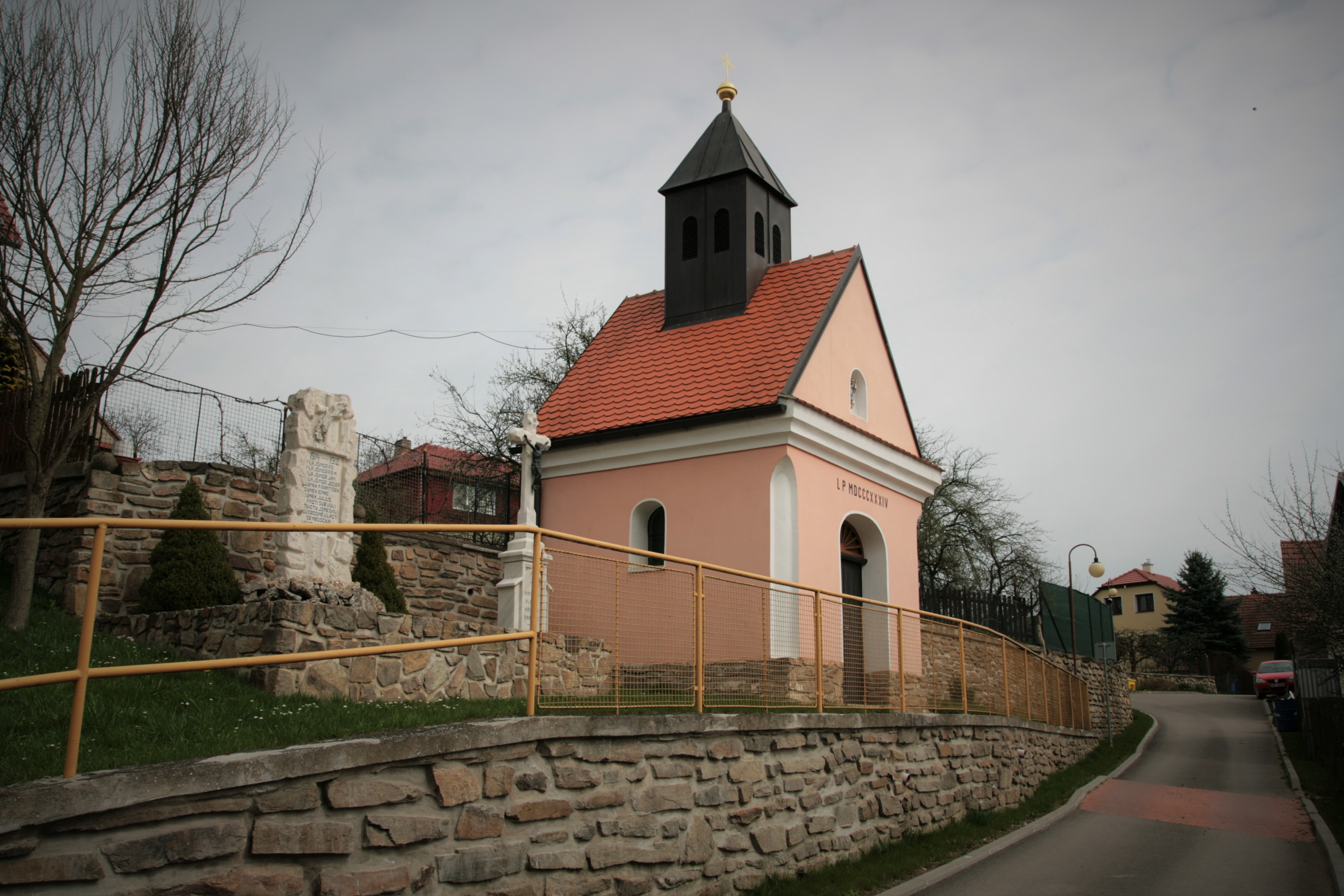
- Chapel of Saint Mary Magdalene

- Flag Coat of arms

- Location in the Czech Republic
- Coordinates: 49°22′46″N 16°21′6″E
- Country: Czech Republic
- Region: South Moravian
- District: Brno-Country
- First mentioned: 1386

Area
  - Total: 4.31 km^{2} (1.66 sq mi)
- Elevation: 437 m (1,434 ft)

Population (2026-01-01)
  - Total: 312
  - Density: 72.4/km^{2} (187/sq mi)
- Time zone: UTC+1 (CET)
  - Summer (DST): UTC+2 (CEST)
- Postal code: 594 55
- Website: www.kaly.cz

Kaly is a municipality and village in Brno-Country District in the South Moravian Region of the Czech Republic. It has about 300 inhabitants.

Kaly lies approximately 29 kilometres (18 mi) north-west of Brno and 160 km (99 mi) south-east of Prague.

== Administrative division ==
Kaly consists of two municipal parts (in brackets population according to the 2021 census):

- Kaly (194)
- Zahrada (99)

== Demographics ==
Historical population
Year	Pop.	±%
1869	263	—
1880	344	+30.8%
1890	355	+3.2%
1900	362	+2.0%
1910	337	−6.9%
1921	345	+2.4%
1930	370	+7.2%
1950	337	−8.9%
1961	328	−2.7%
1970	312	−4.9%
1980	276	−11.5%
1991	282	+2.2%
2001	254	−9.9%
2011	248	−2.4%
2021	293	+18.1%
Source: Censuses
