= Lukovany =

- Municipality
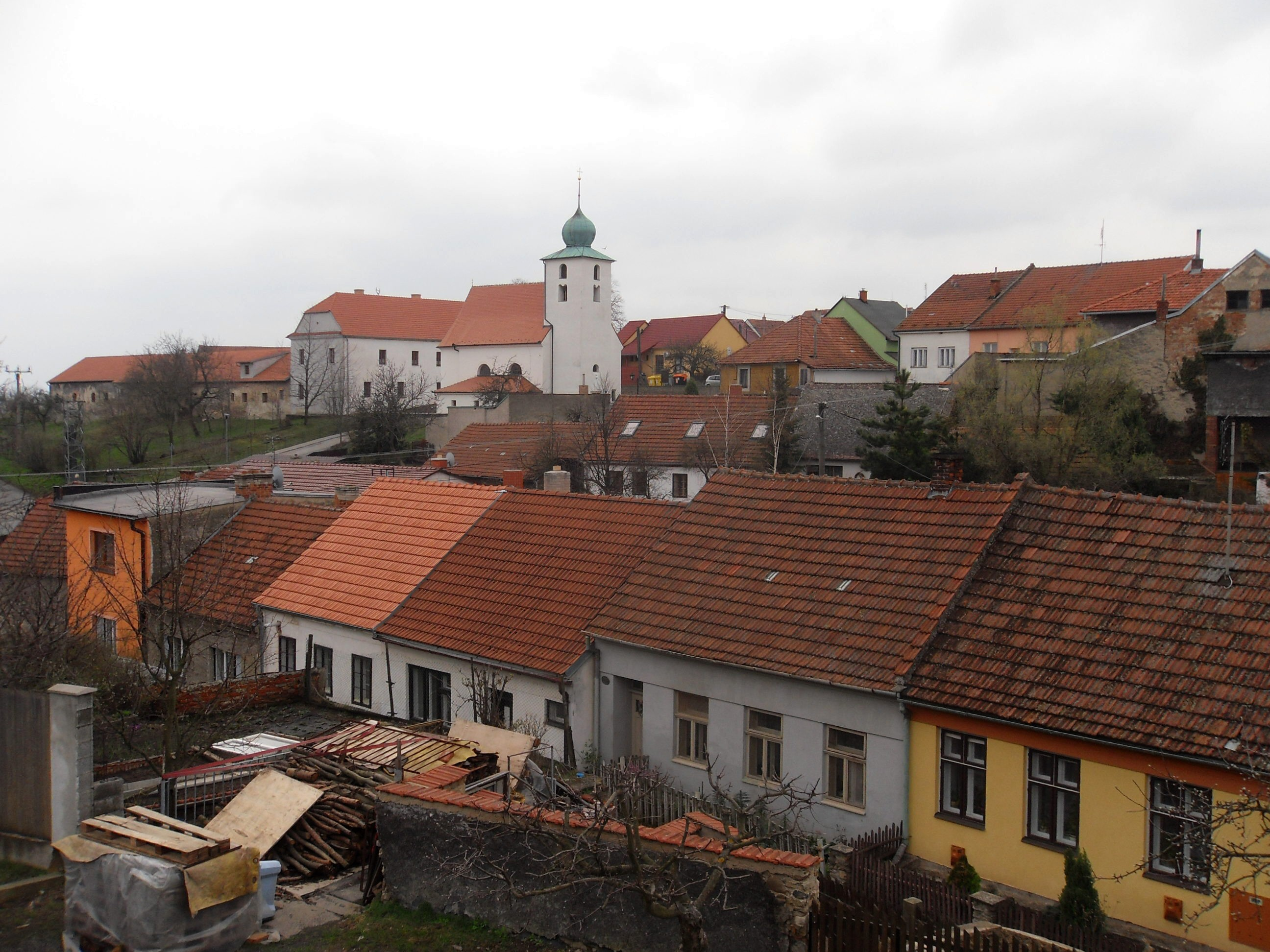
- View towards the Church of Saint Wenceslaus

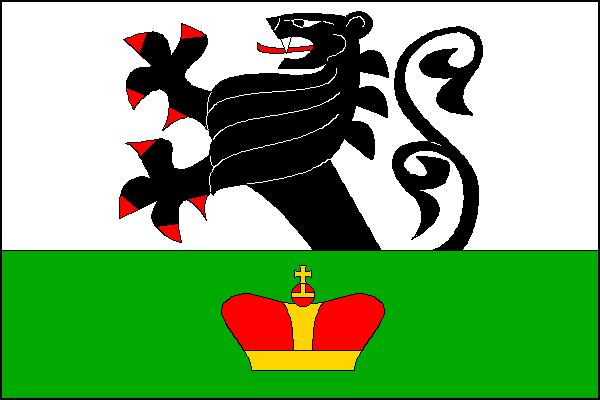
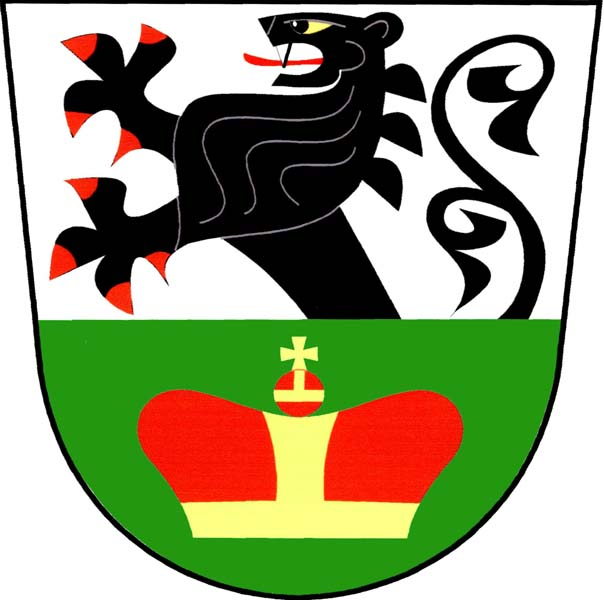
- Flag Coat of arms

- Location in the Czech Republic
- Coordinates: 49°9′45″N 16°17′52″E
- Country: Czech Republic
- Region: South Moravian
- District: Brno-Country
- First mentioned: 1269

Area
  - Total: 9.07 km^{2} (3.50 sq mi)
- Elevation: 415 m (1,362 ft)

Population (2026-01-01)
  - Total: 675
  - Density: 74.4/km^{2} (193/sq mi)
- Time zone: UTC+1 (CET)
  - Summer (DST): UTC+2 (CEST)
- Postal code: 664 84
- Website: www.lukovany.cz

Lukovany is a municipality and village in Brno-Country District in the South Moravian Region of the Czech Republic. It has about 700 inhabitants.

Lukovany lies approximately 24 kilometres (15 mi) west of Brno and 170 km (110 mi) south-east of Prague.

== Demographics ==
Historical population
Year	Pop.	±%
1869	545	—
1880	560	+2.8%
1890	608	+8.6%
1900	678	+11.5%
1910	723	+6.6%
1921	791	+9.4%
1930	806	+1.9%
1950	875	+8.6%
1961	897	+2.5%
1970	841	−6.2%
1980	701	−16.6%
1991	527	−24.8%
2001	524	−0.6%
2011	557	+6.3%
2021	627	+12.6%
Source: Censuses
