= Borovník =

- Municipality
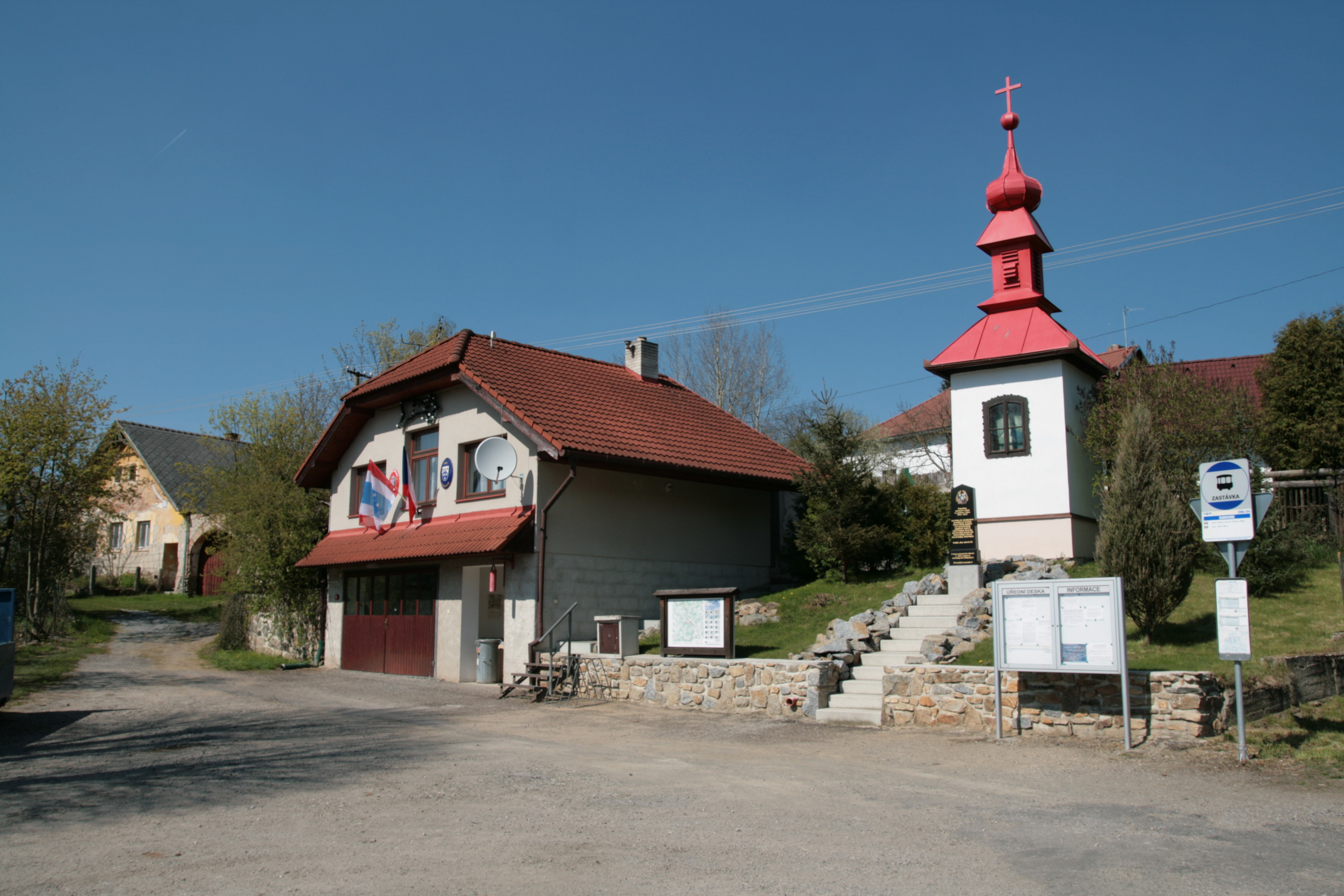
- Centre of Borovník

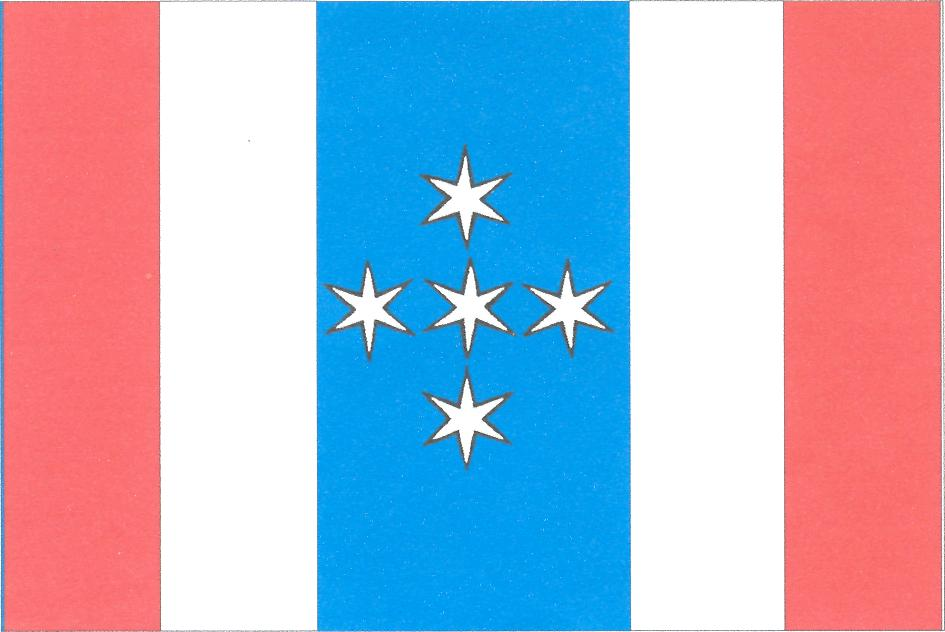
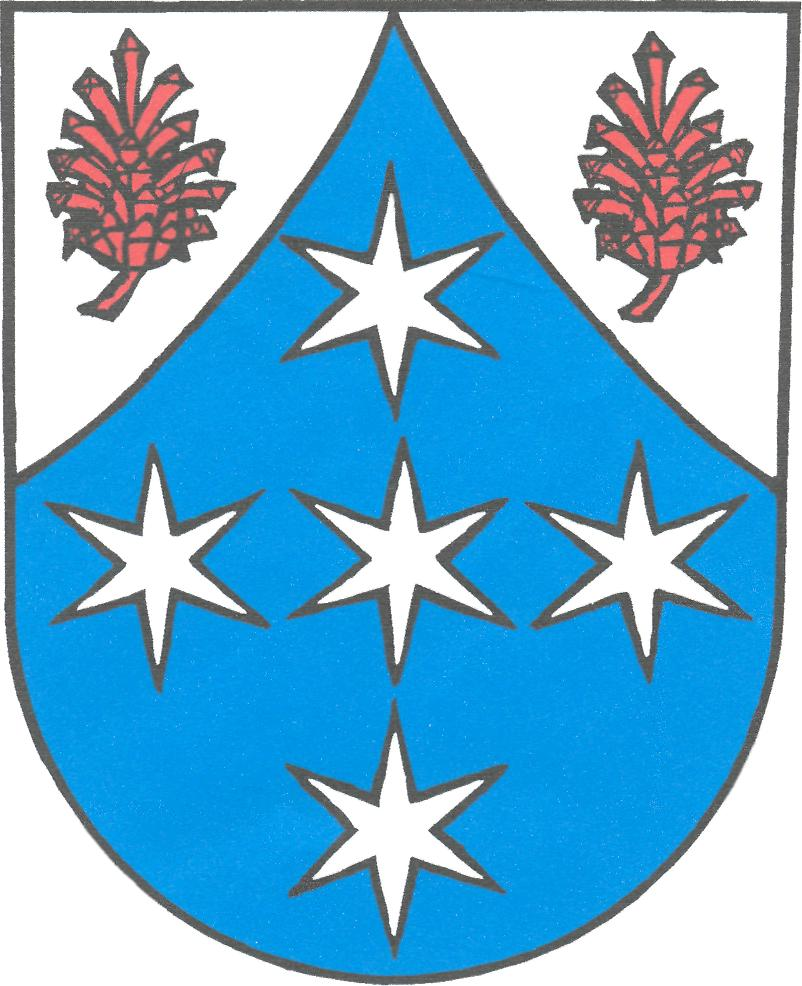
- Flag Coat of arms

- Location in the Czech Republic
- Coordinates: 49°21′20″N 16°13′46″E
- Country: Czech Republic
- Region: South Moravian
- District: Brno-Country
- First mentioned: 1398

Area
  - Total: 2.72 km^{2} (1.05 sq mi)
- Elevation: 488 m (1,601 ft)

Population (2026-01-01)
  - Total: 111
  - Density: 40.8/km^{2} (106/sq mi)
- Time zone: UTC+1 (CET)
  - Summer (DST): UTC+2 (CEST)
- Postal code: 594 51
- Website: www.borovnik.cz

Borovník is a municipality and village in Brno-Country District in the South Moravian Region of the Czech Republic. It has about 100 inhabitants.

Borovník lies approximately 33 kilometres (21 mi) north-west of Brno and 154 km (96 mi) south-east of Prague.

== Demographics ==
Historical population
Year	Pop.	±%
1869	178	—
1880	168	−5.6%
1890	166	−1.2%
1900	170	+2.4%
1910	154	−9.4%
1921	158	+2.6%
1930	137	−13.3%
1950	114	−16.8%
1961	115	+0.9%
1970	98	−14.8%
1980	84	−14.3%
1991	79	−6.0%
2001	87	+10.1%
2011	92	+5.7%
2021	108	+17.4%
Source: Censuses
