= Litostrov =

- Municipality
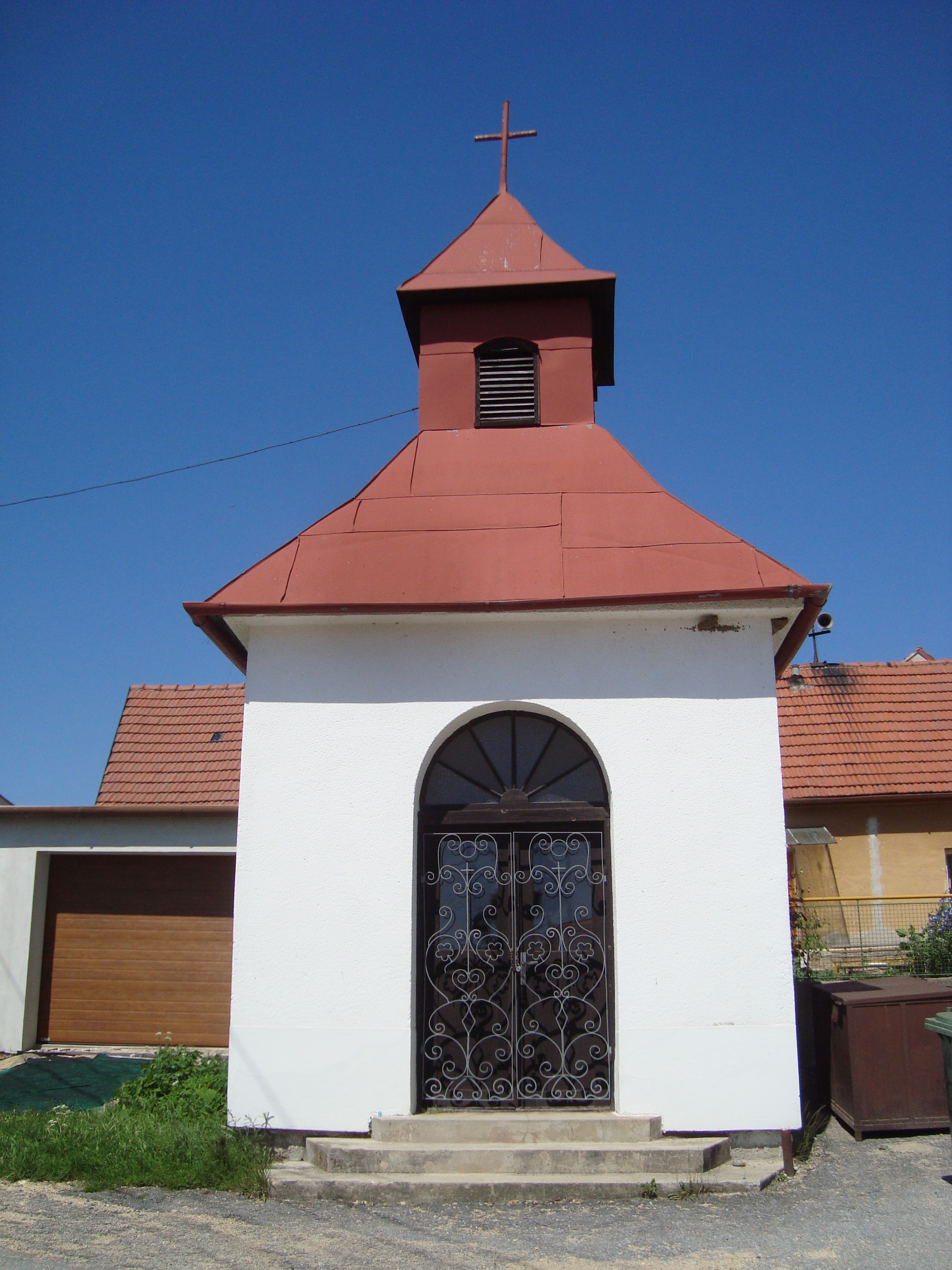
- Belfry

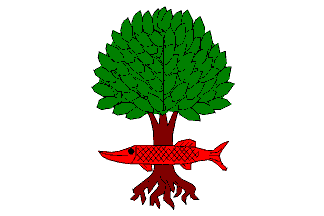
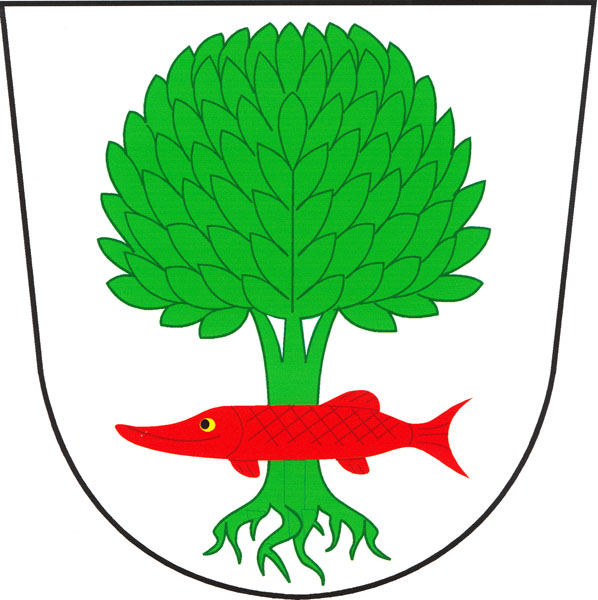
- Flag Coat of arms

- Location in the Czech Republic
- Coordinates: 49°13′28″N 16°19′46″E
- Country: Czech Republic
- Region: South Moravian
- District: Brno-Country
- First mentioned: 1376

Area
  - Total: 7.54 km^{2} (2.91 sq mi)
- Elevation: 440 m (1,440 ft)

Population (2026-01-01)
  - Total: 131
  - Density: 17.4/km^{2} (45.0/sq mi)
- Time zone: UTC+1 (CET)
  - Summer (DST): UTC+2 (CEST)
- Postal code: 664 83
- Website: www.obeclitostrov.cz

Litostrov is a municipality and village in Brno-Country District in the South Moravian Region of the Czech Republic. It has about 100 inhabitants.

Litostrov lies approximately 21 kilometres (13 mi) west of Brno and 169 km (105 mi) south-east of Prague.

== Demographics ==
Historical population
Year	Pop.	±%
1869	180	—
1880	162	−10.0%
1890	225	+38.9%
1900	165	−26.7%
1910	165	+0.0%
1921	187	+13.3%
1930	226	+20.9%
1950	202	−10.6%
1961	210	+4.0%
1970	195	−7.1%
1980	166	−14.9%
1991	120	−27.7%
2001	100	−16.7%
2011	113	+13.0%
2021	128	+13.3%
Source: Censuses
