= Synalov =

- Municipality
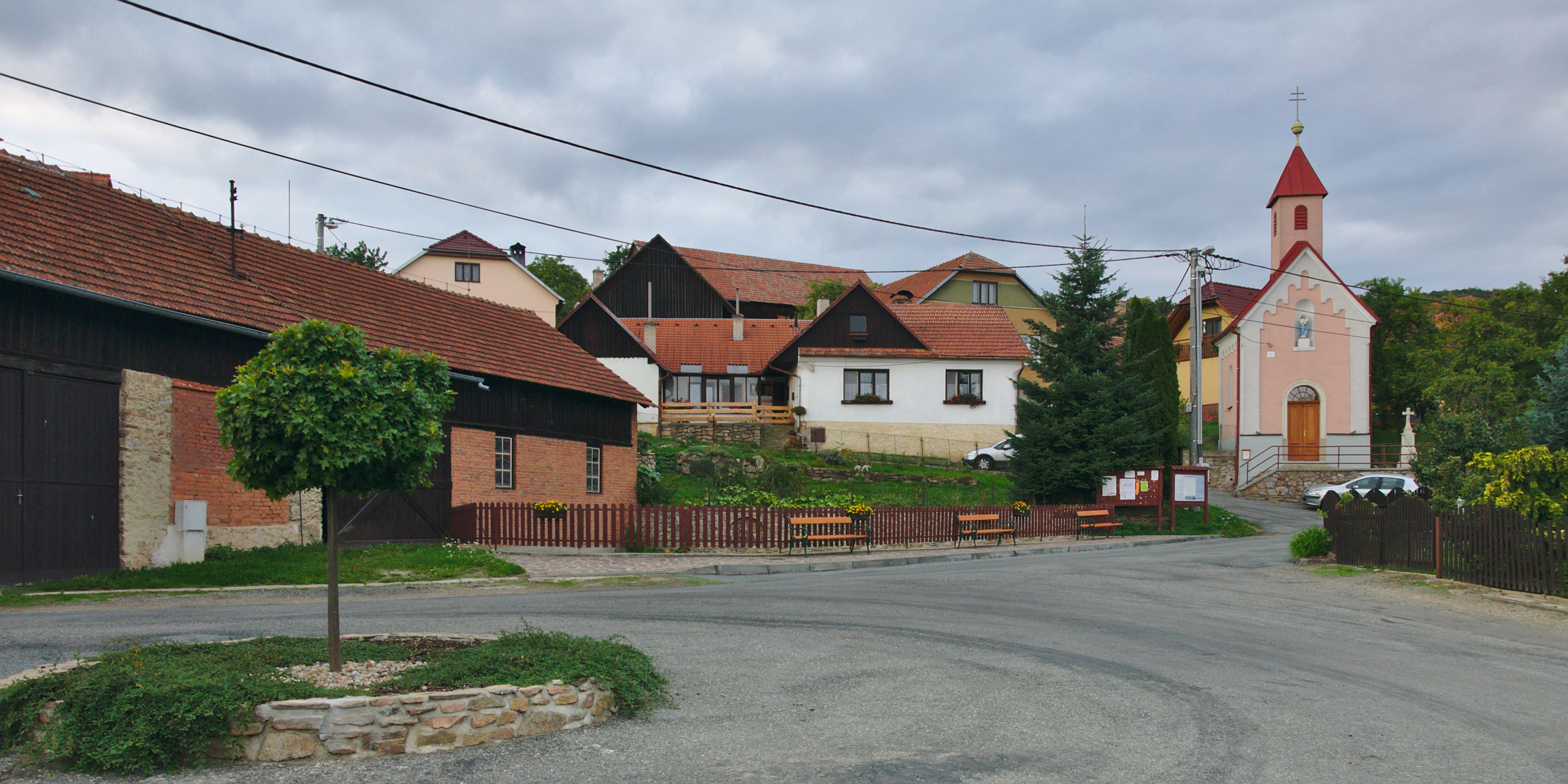
- Centre of Synalov

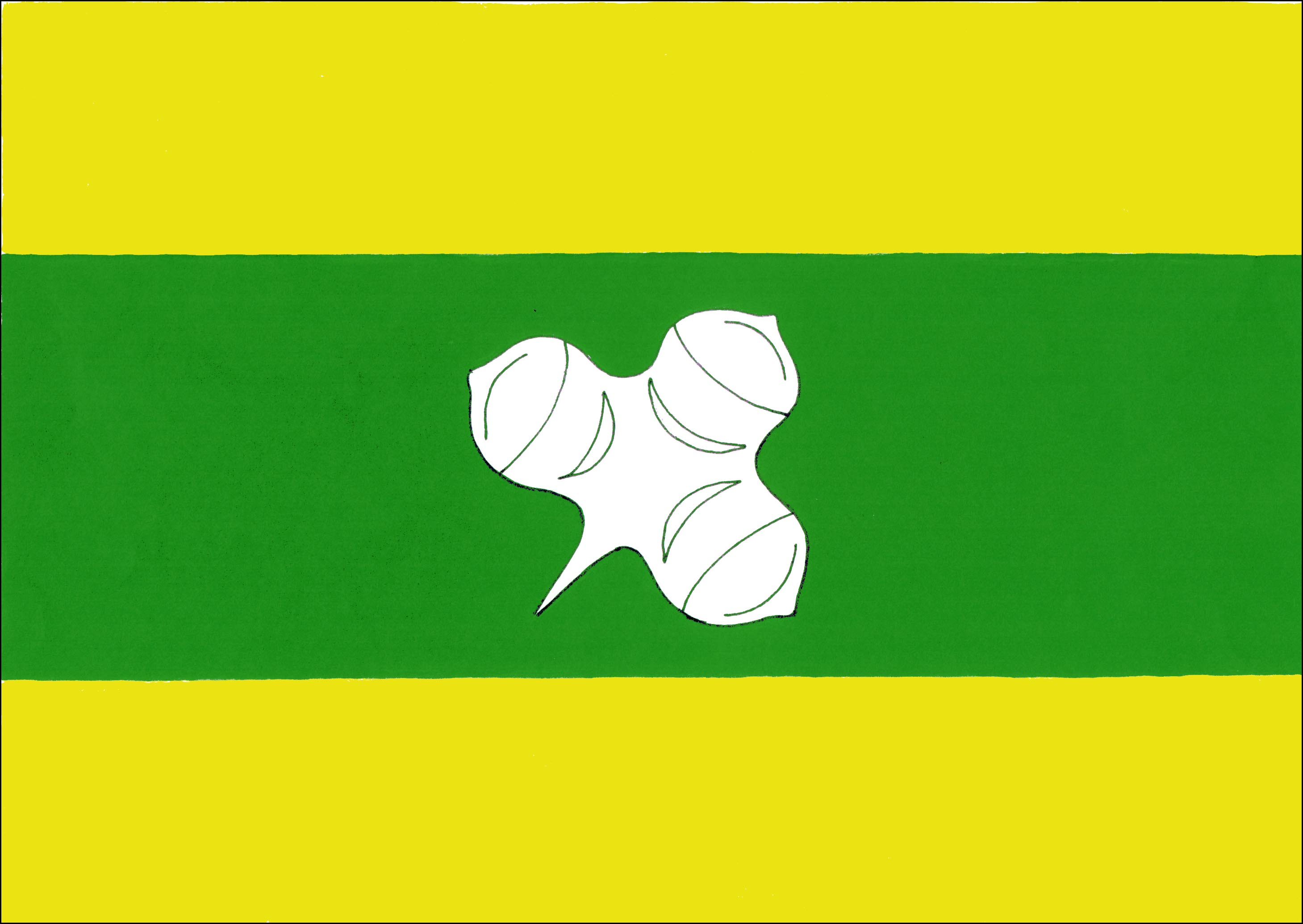
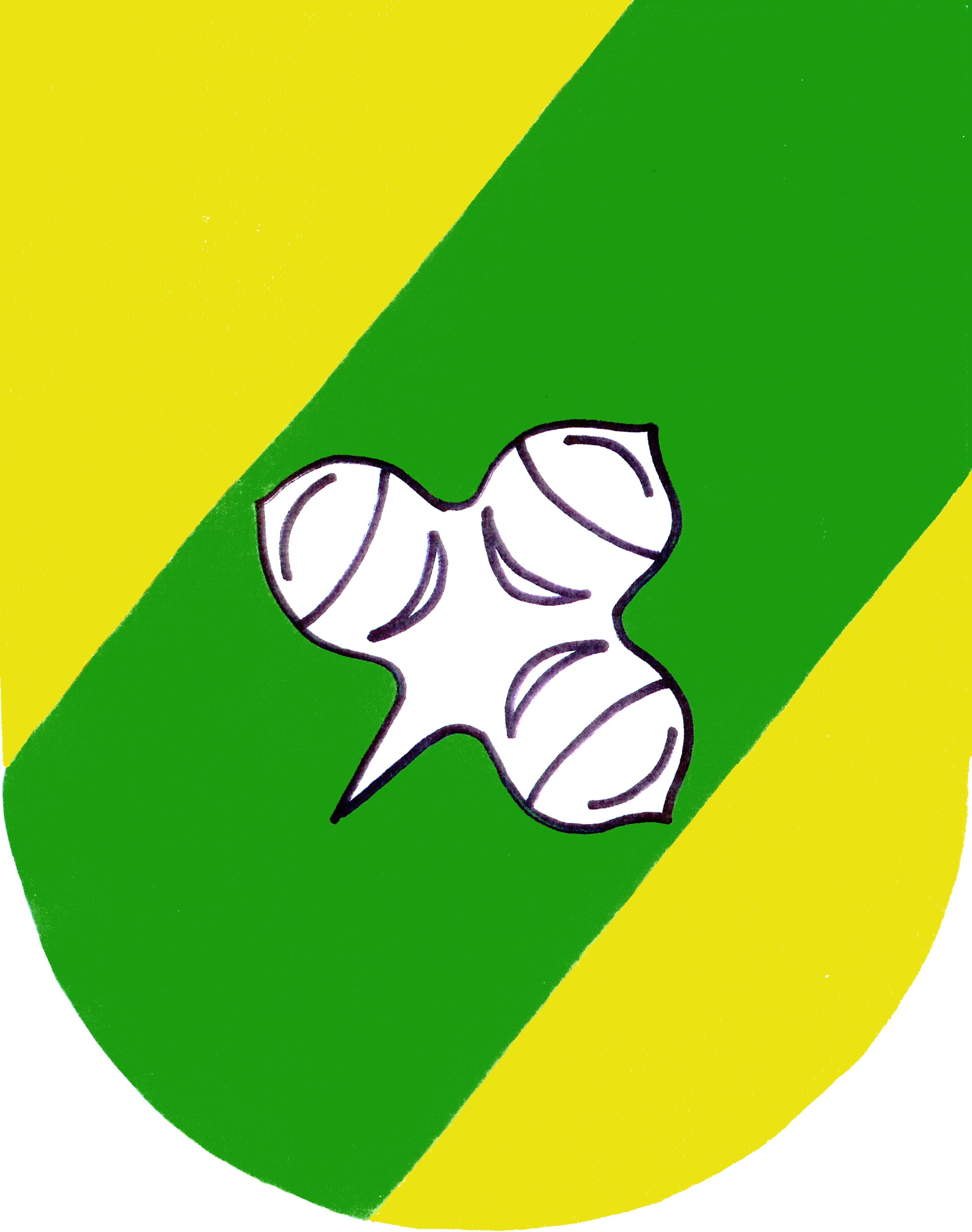
- Flag Coat of arms

- Location in the Czech Republic
- Coordinates: 49°25′58″N 16°24′50″E
- Country: Czech Republic
- Region: South Moravian
- District: Brno-Country
- First mentioned: 1360

Area
  - Total: 6.92 km^{2} (2.67 sq mi)
- Elevation: 520 m (1,710 ft)

Population (2026-01-01)
  - Total: 114
  - Density: 16.5/km^{2} (42.7/sq mi)
- Time zone: UTC+1 (CET)
  - Summer (DST): UTC+2 (CEST)
- Postal code: 679 23
- Website: www.synalov.cz

Synalov is a municipality and village in Brno-Country District in the South Moravian Region of the Czech Republic. It has about 100 inhabitants.

Synalov lies approximately 31 kilometres (19 mi) north-west of Brno and 160 km (99 mi) south-east of Prague.

== Demographics ==
Historical population
Year	Pop.	±%
1869	294	—
1880	311	+5.8%
1890	283	−9.0%
1900	325	+14.8%
1910	314	−3.4%
1921	316	+0.6%
1930	297	−6.0%
1950	240	−19.2%
1961	212	−11.7%
1970	183	−13.7%
1980	169	−7.7%
1991	130	−23.1%
2001	115	−11.5%
2011	120	+4.3%
2021	122	+1.7%
Source: Censuses
