= Rojetín =

- Municipality
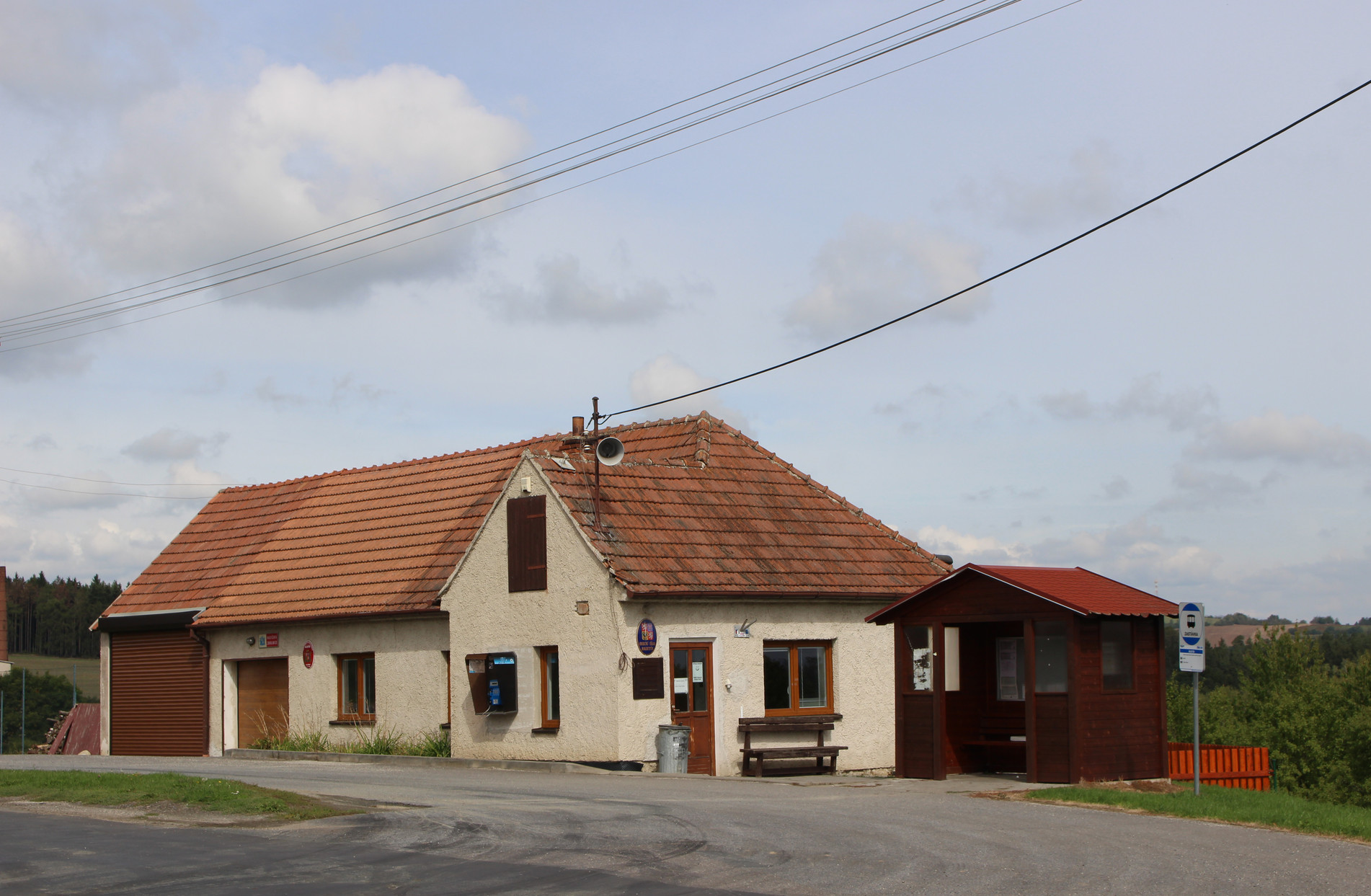
- Municipal office

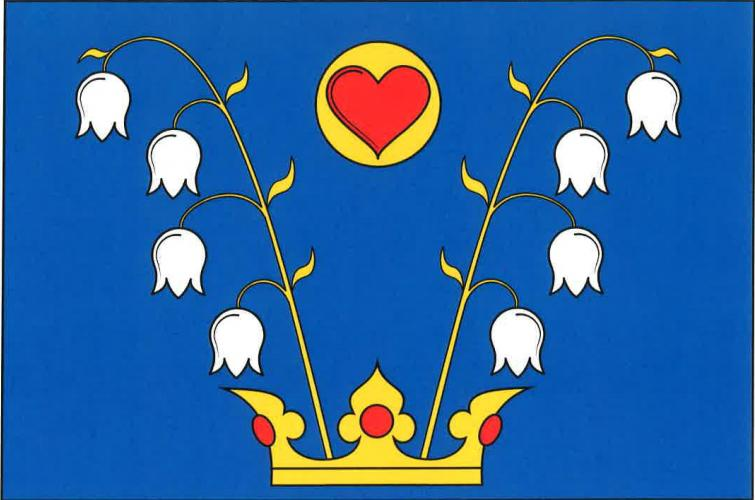
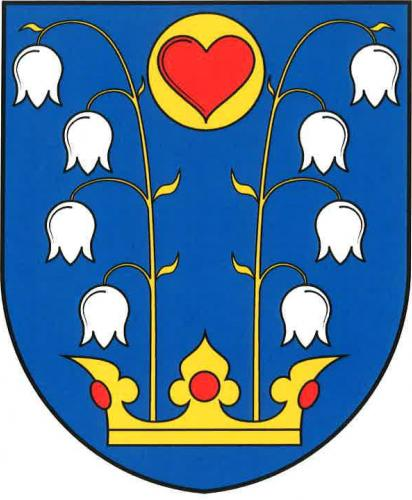
- Flag Coat of arms

- Location in the Czech Republic
- Coordinates: 49°22′0″N 16°15′27″E
- Country: Czech Republic
- Region: South Moravian
- District: Brno-Country
- First mentioned: 1355

Area
  - Total: 4.28 km^{2} (1.65 sq mi)
- Elevation: 476 m (1,562 ft)

Population (2026-01-01)
  - Total: 83
  - Density: 19/km^{2} (50/sq mi)
- Time zone: UTC+1 (CET)
  - Summer (DST): UTC+2 (CEST)
- Postal code: 594 51
- Website: obecrojetin.cz

Rojetín is a municipality and village in Brno-Country District in the South Moravian Region of the Czech Republic. It has about 80 inhabitants.

Rojetín lies approximately 33 kilometres (21 mi) north-west of Brno and 154 km (96 mi) south-east of Prague.

== Demographics ==
Historical population
Year	Pop.	±%
1869	217	—
1880	219	+0.9%
1890	241	+10.0%
1900	257	+6.6%
1910	245	−4.7%
1921	250	+2.0%
1930	222	−11.2%
1950	184	−17.1%
1961	163	−11.4%
1970	140	−14.1%
1980	108	−22.9%
1991	84	−22.2%
2001	76	−9.5%
2011	67	−11.8%
2021	78	+16.4%
Source: Censuses
