= Brno-Country District =

Brno-Country District Okres Brno-venkov
- District
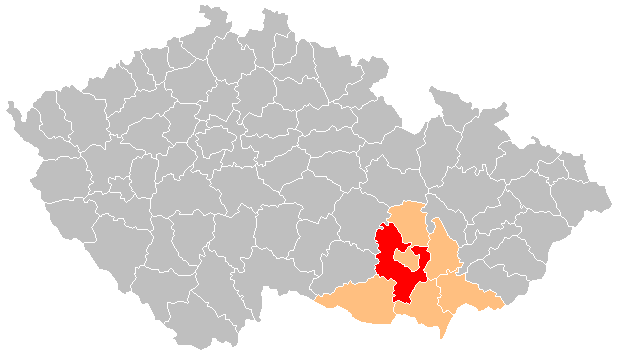
- Location in the South Moravian Region within the Czech Republic
- Coordinates: 49°8′N 16°29′E
- Country: Czech Republic
- Region: South Moravian
- Capital: Brno

Area
  - Total: 1,499.02 km^{2} (578.77 sq mi)

Population (2026)
  - Total: 234,833
  - Density: 156.658/km^{2} (405.742/sq mi)
- Time zone: UTC+1 (CET)
  - Summer (DST): UTC+2 (CEST)
- Municipalities: 187
- * Towns: 14
- * Market towns: 10

Brno-Country District (Czech: okres Brno-venkov) is a district in the South Moravian Region of the Czech Republic. Its capital is the city of Brno. The most populous town of the district is Kuřim. The district is made up of 187 municipalities, which is the highest number within all districts of the Czech Republic.

== Administrative division ==
Brno-Country District is divided into seven administrative districts of municipalities with extended competence: Ivančice, Kuřim, Pohořelice, Rosice, Šlapanice, Tišnov, and Židlochovice.

=== List of municipalities ===
Towns are marked in bold and market towns in italics:

Babice nad Svitavou - Babice u Rosic - Běleč - Bílovice nad Svitavou - Biskoupky - Blažovice - Blučina - Borač - Borovník - Branišovice - Branišovice - Bratčice - Brumov - Březina (former Blansko District) - Březina (former Tišnov District) - Bukovice - Čebín - Černvír - Česká - Chudčice - Čučice - Cvrčovice - Deblín - Dolní Kounice - Dolní Loučky - Domašov - Doubravník - Drahonín - Drásov - Hajany - Heroltice - Hlína - Hluboké Dvory - Holasice - Horní Loučky - Hostěnice - Hradčany - Hrušovany u Brna - Hvozdec - Ivaň - Ivančice - Javůrek - Jinačovice - Jiříkovice - Kaly - Kanice - Katov - Ketkovice - Kobylnice - Kovalovice - Kratochvilka - Křižínkov - Kupařovice - Kuřim - Kuřimská Nová Ves - Kuřimské Jestřabí - Lažánky - Ledce - Lelekovice - Lesní Hluboké - Litostrov - Loděnice - Lomnice - Lomnička - Lubné - Lukovany - Malešovice - Malhostovice - Maršov - Medlov - Mělčany - Měnín - Modřice - Mokrá-Horákov - Moravany - Moravské Bránice - Moravské Knínice - Moutnice - Nebovidy - Nedvědice - Nelepeč-Žernůvka - Němčičky - Neslovice - Nesvačilka - Níhov - Nosislav - Nová Ves - Nové Bránice - Odrovice - Ochoz u Brna - Ochoz u Tišnova - Olší - Omice - Opatovice - Ořechov - Osiky - Oslavany - Ostopovice - Ostrovačice - Otmarov - Pasohlávky - Pernštejnské Jestřabí - Podolí - Pohořelice - Ponětovice - Popovice - Popůvky - Pozořice - Prace - Pravlov - Prštice - Předklášteří - Přibice - Příbram na Moravě - Přibyslavice - Přísnotice - Radostice - Rajhrad - Rajhradice - Rašov - Rebešovice - Řícmanice - Říčany - Říčky - Řikonín - Rohozec - Rojetín - Rosice - Rozdrojovice - Rudka - Senorady - Sentice - Šerkovice - Silůvky - Sivice - Skalička - Skryje - Šlapanice - Sobotovice - Sokolnice - Stanoviště - Štěpánovice - Strhaře - Střelice - Šumice - Svatoslav - Synalov - Syrovice - Telnice - Těšany - Tetčice - Tišnov - Tišnovská Nová Ves - Trboušany - Troskotovice - Troubsko - Tvarožná - Újezd u Brna - Újezd u Rosic - Újezd u Tišnova - Unín - Unkovice - Úsuší - Velatice - Veverská Bítýška - Veverské Knínice - Viničné Šumice - Vlasatice - Vohančice - Vojkovice - Vranov - Vranovice - Vratislávka - Všechovice - Vysoké Popovice - Žabčice - Zakřany - Zálesná Zhoř - Zastávka - Žatčany - Zbraslav - Zbýšov - Žďárec - Želešice - Železné - Zhoř - Židlochovice

== Geography ==
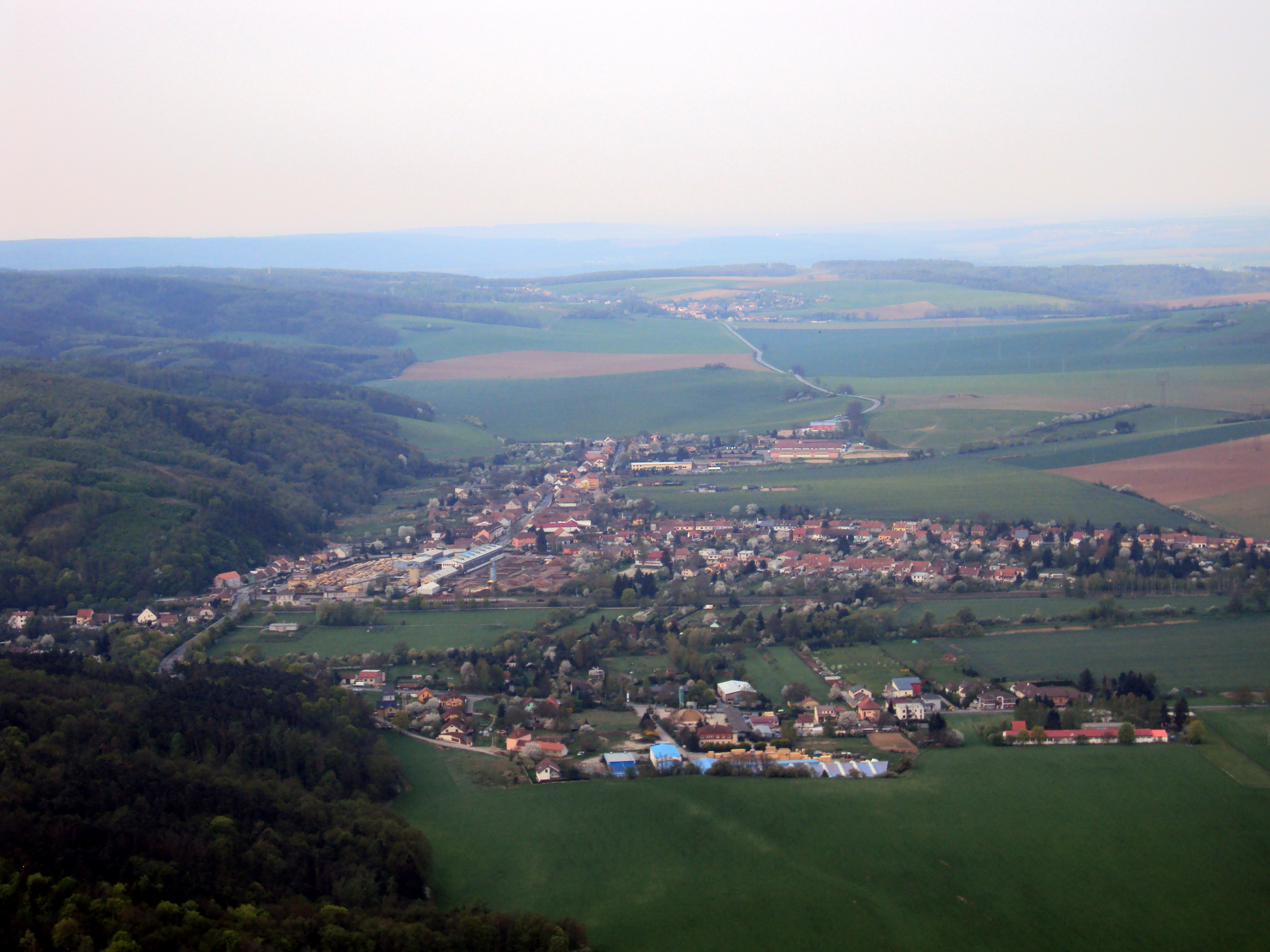
Tetčice and surrounding landscape

Brno-Country District surrounds the city of Brno from almost all sides and thus has a non-standard shape and diverse character: hilly and forested in the northern part and flat and deforested in the southern part. The territory extends into six geomorphological mesoregions: Upper Svratka Highlands (north), Křižanov Highlands (west), Dyje–Svratka Valley (south), Bobrava Highlands (southwest and northeast), Boskovice Furrow (a strip along the Bobrava Highlands across the territory) and Drahany Highlands (east). The highest point of the district is the hill Sýkoř in Synalov with an elevation of 705 m (2,313 ft), the lowest point is the Nové Mlýny Reservoir in Pasohlávky at 169 m (554 ft).

From the total district area of 1,499.0 km^{2} (578.8 sq mi), agricultural land occupies 836.7 km^{2} (323.1 sq mi), forests occupy 474.8 km^{2} (183.3 sq mi), and water area occupies 29.9 km^{2} (11.5 sq mi). Forests cover 31.7% of the district's area.

The longest rivers are the Svratka, which flows across the entire territory from north to south, and Jihlava, which flows from the west and joins the Svratka before the southern district border. Other important rivers are the Oslava, Svitava, Bobrůvka and Litava. There are not many bodies of water. The only exception is the southernmost part of the territory with a system of ponds and with a part of Nové Mlýny reservoirs.

Part of the Moravian Karst Protected Landscape Area extends into the district in the east and is the only large-scale protected area in the district.

== Demographics ==
Historical population

Year	Pop.	±%
1869	125,785	—
1880	134,107	+6.6%
1890	141,570	+5.6%
1900	147,974	+4.5%
1910	159,725	+7.9%

Year	Pop.	±%
1921	165,186	+3.4%
1930	178,555	+8.1%
1950	170,746	−4.4%
1961	183,301	+7.4%
1970	184,058	+0.4%

Year	Pop.	±%
1980	189,022	+2.7%
1991	179,099	−5.2%
2001	181,686	+1.4%
2011	206,300	+13.5%
2021	226,503	+9.8%

Source: Censuses

=== Most populous municipalities ===
Name	Population	Area (km^{2})
Kuřim	11,499	17
Ivančice	9,905	48
Tišnov	9,270	17
Šlapanice	7,940	15
Rosice	6,825	13
Pohořelice	6,299	43
Modřice	5,673	10
Oslavany	4,844	19
Rajhrad	4,113	9
Zbýšov	3,707	6

== Economy ==
The largest employers with headquarters in Brno-Country District and at least 500 employees are:

Economic entity	Location	Number of employees	Main activity
TE Connectivity Czech	Kuřim	2,000–2,499	Manufacture of wiring and wiring devices
Hartmann – Rico	Veverská Bítýška	1,500–1,999	Manufacture of hygienic and medical aids
DHL Supply Chain	Pohořelice	1,000–1,499	Warehousing and logistics
Ivančice Hospital	Ivančice	500–999	Health care
Delikomat	Modřice	500–999	Retail sale
IFE-CR	Modřice	500–999	Manufacture of boarding systems for rolling stock
IMI International	Modřice	500–999	Manufacture of taps and valves
Inventec (Czech)	Modřice	500–999	Manufacture of electrical equipment
S Promotion	Modřice	500–999	Advertising

== Transport ==
The D1 motorway from Prague to Brno and Ostrava runs across the district. The D2 motorway separates from it and runs from Brno to Czech–Slovak border. There is also the short section of the D52 motorway from Brno to Pohořelice, which further continues as the I/53 road to Znojmo.

== Sights ==
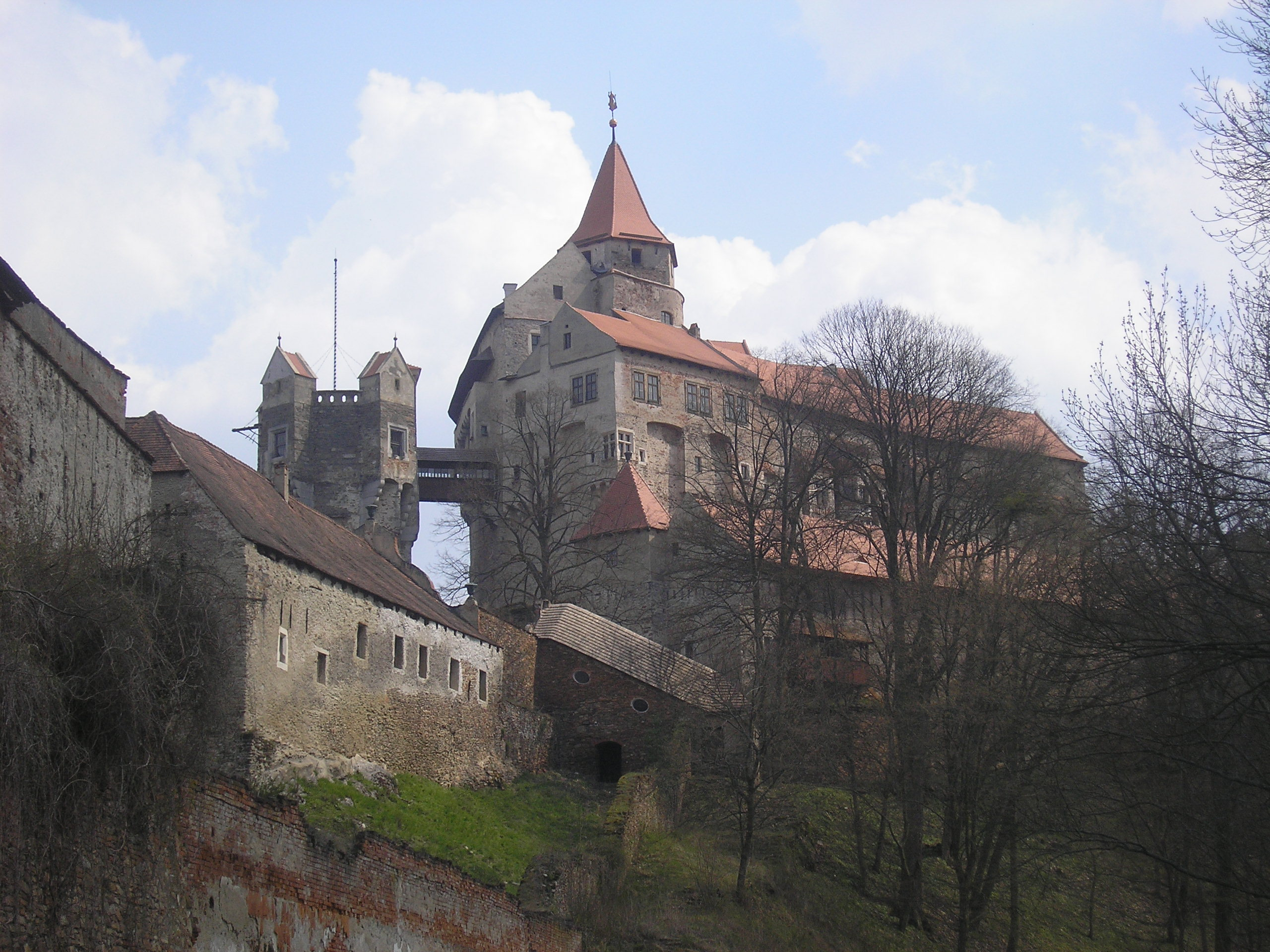
Pernštejn Castle

The most important monuments in the district, protected as national cultural monuments, are:

- Pernštejn Castle
- Porta coeli Convent
- Rosice Castle

The best-preserved settlements and landscapes, protected as monument zones, are:

- Doubravník
- Ivančice
- Lomnice
- Battlefield of the Battle of Austerlitz (partly)

The most visited tourist destination is the water park Aqualand Moravia in Pasohlávky.
