= List of castles in the South Moravian Region =

This is a list of castles and chateaux located in the South Moravian Region of the Czech Republic.

== B ==
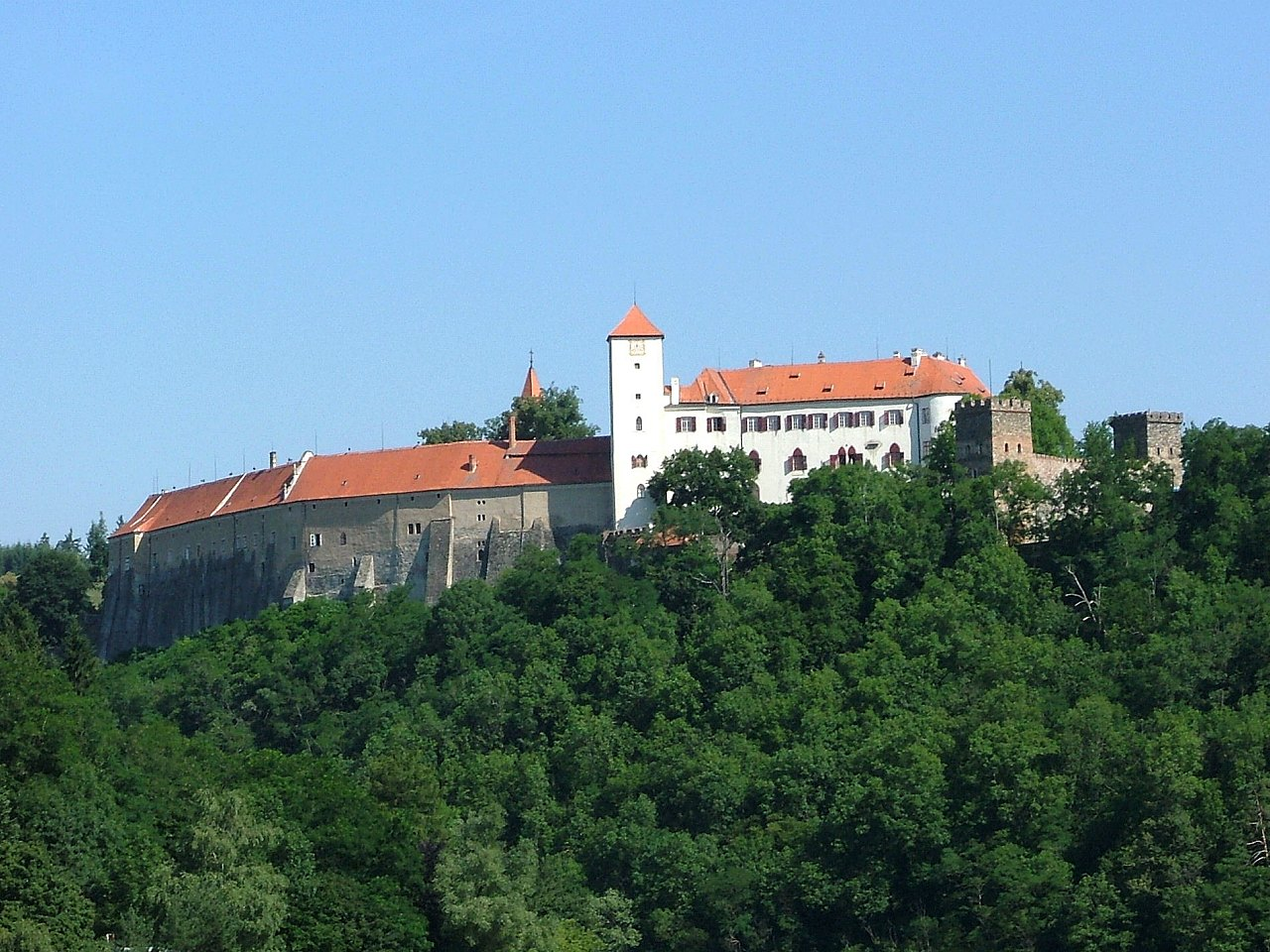
Bítov Castle.

- Babice Castle
- Bítov Castle
- Blansek Castle
- Blansko Chateau
- Bohuslavice Castle
- Boleradice Castle
- Boskovice - Bašta Castle
- Boskovice - Rezidence Chateau
- Boskovice Castle
- Boskovice Chateau
- Branišovice Chateau
- Brnen Castle
- Brno - Pisárky Chateau
- Břeclav Chateau
- Břežany Chateau
- Bučín Castle
- Bučovice Castle
- Bučovice Chateau
- Bukovina Castle
- Bzenec Castle

== C ==
- Chrlice Chateau
- Chvalkovice na Hané Chateau
- Cornštejn Castle
- Čejkovice Chateau
- Čepička Castle
- Černá Hora Chateau

== D ==
- Deblín Castle
- Dědice Castle
- Děvičky Castle
- Dolní Kounice Chateau
- Doubravice nad Svitavou Castle
- Drnholec Chateau
- Drnovice Chateau
- Dyje Chateau

== E ==
- Emin zámek Chateau

== F ==
- Ferdinandsko Chateau
- Frejštejn Castle

== H ==
- Habrovany Chateau
- Hodonín Chateau
- Holštejn Castle
- Horákov Castle
- Horní Dunajovice Chateau
- Hostim Chateau
- Hradisko u Velkých Bílovic Castle
- Hradisko Castle
- Hraniční zámek Chateau
- Hrádek u Drnholce Castle
- Hrádek u Snovídek Castle
- Hrubšice Chateau
- Hrušovany nad Jevišovkou Chateau

== I ==
- Ivanovice na Hané Chateau

== J ==
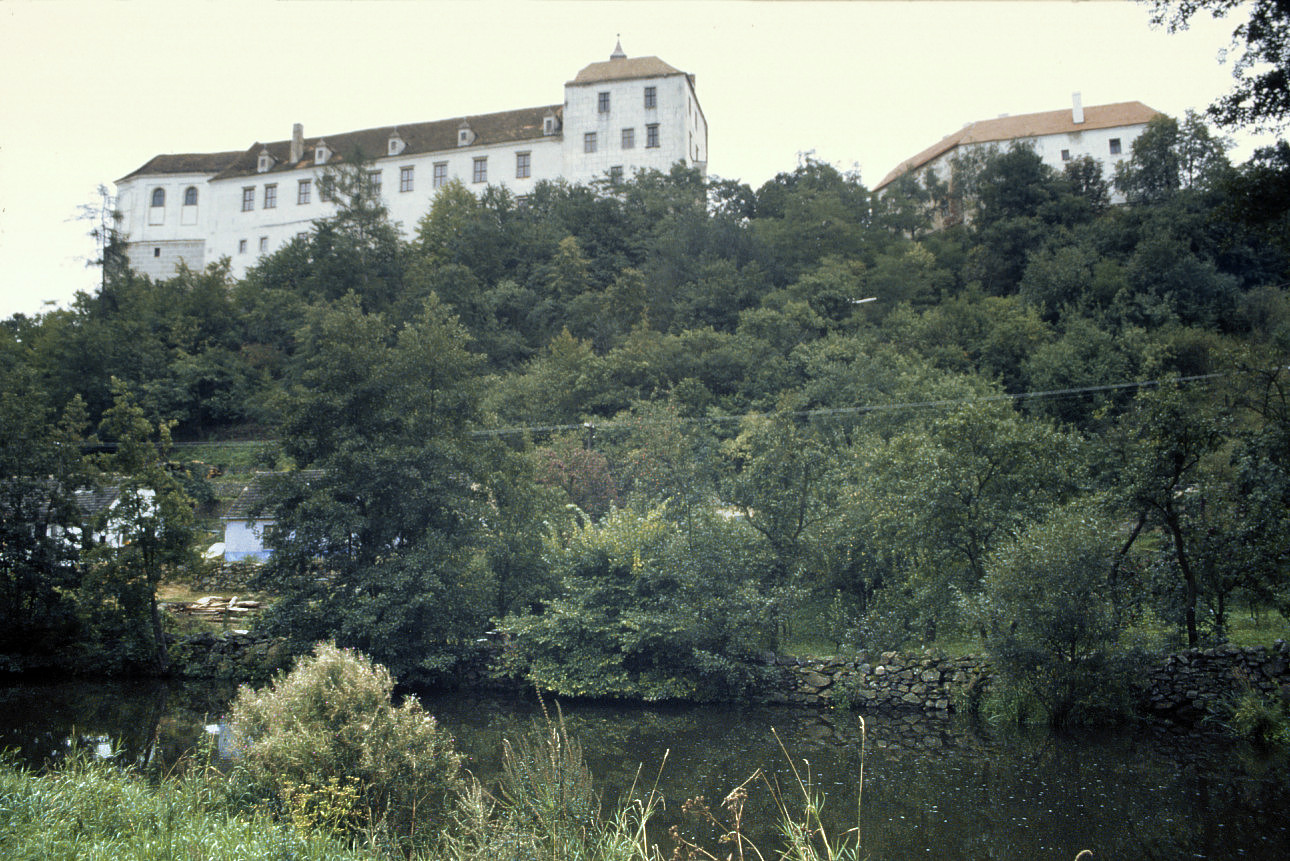
Jevišovice Castle.

- Janův Hrad Castle
- Jaroslavice Chateau
- Jevišovice Castle

== K ==
- Kanšperk Castle
- Kepkov Castle
- Klobouky u Brna Chateau
- Kociánka Chateau
- Komorov Chateau
- Koryčany Chateau
- Kravsko Chateau
- Křetín Chateau
- Křtiny Chateau
- Kuchlov Castle
- Kunštát Chateau
- Kupařovice Chateau
- Kuřim Chateau
- Kyjov Chateau

== L ==
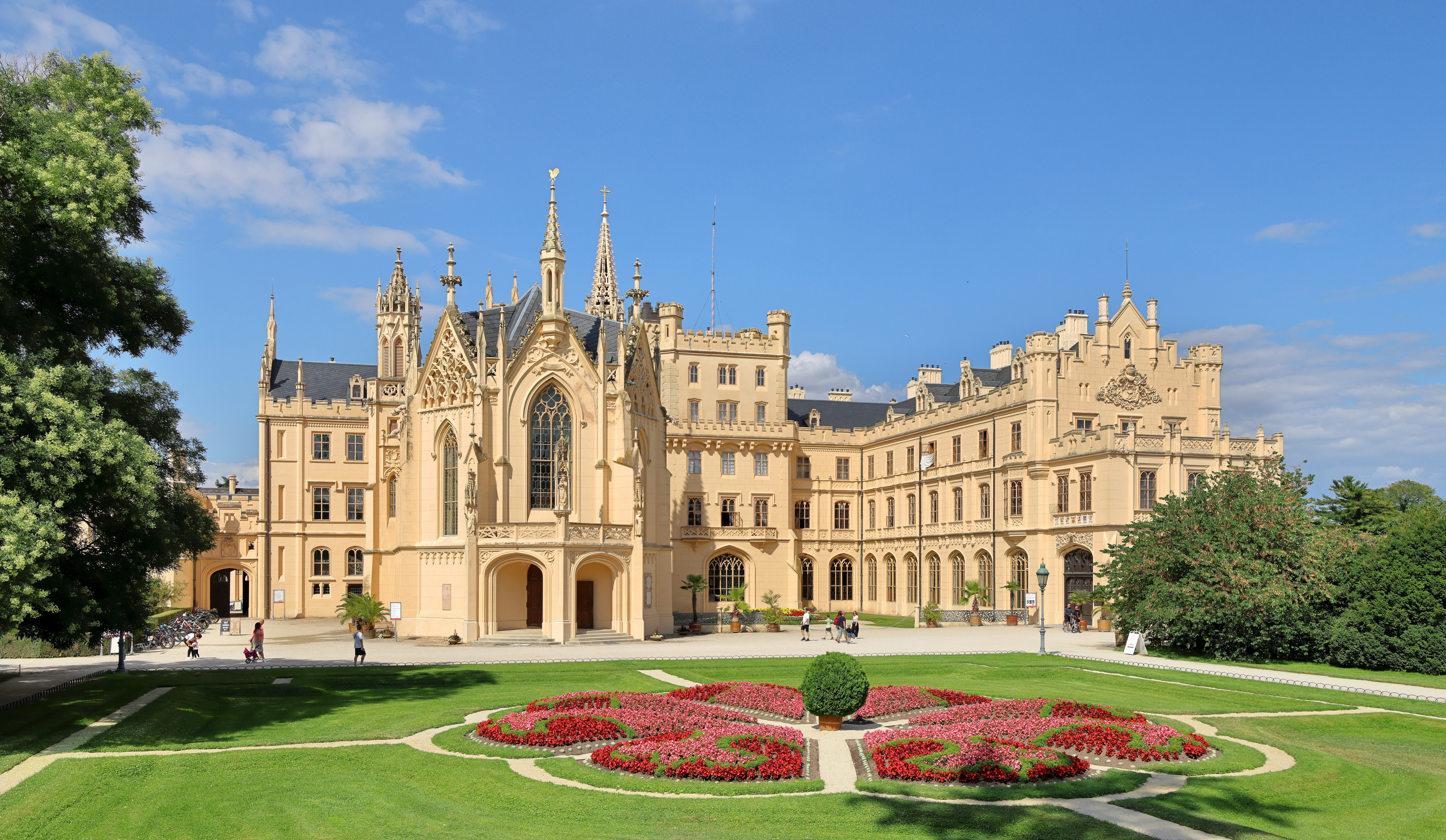
Lednice Chateau

- Lamberg Chateau
- Lapikus Castle
- Lechovice Chateau
- Lečenec Castle
- Lednice Chateau
- Ledvice (Vémyslice) Castle
- Lelekovice Castle
- Leopoldsruhe Chateau
- Lesní Hluboké Chateau
- Letohrádek Mitrovských Chateau
- Letovice Chateau
- Levnov Castle
- Lhota Rapotina Chateau
- Líšeň Chateau
- Lomnice Chateau
- Louka Castle, Louka, Blansko District
- Louka Chateau
- Lovecký zámeček Chateau
- Luleč Castle
- Lysice Chateau

== M ==
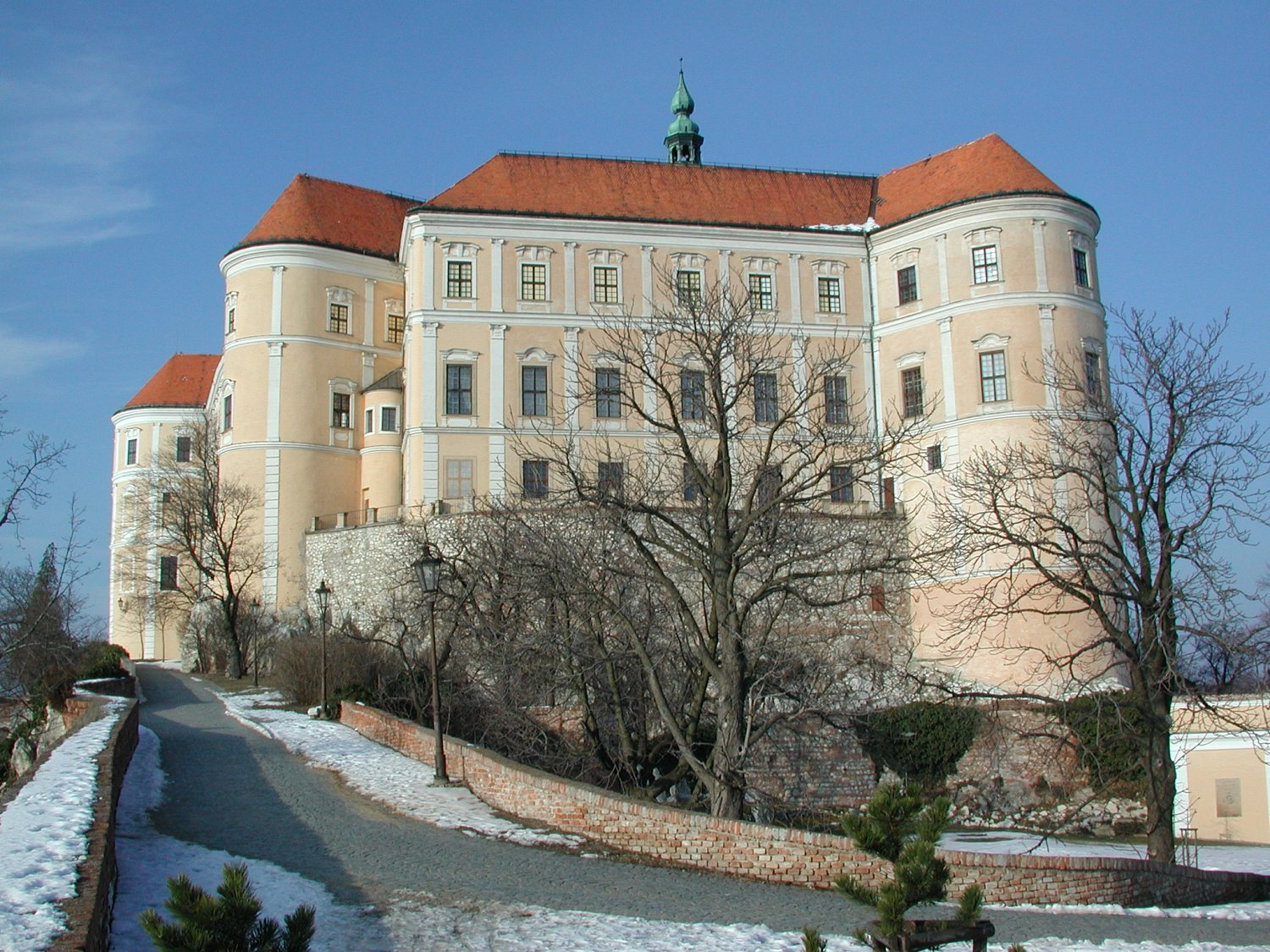
Mikulov Castle

- Medlánky Chateau
- Melice Castle
- Mikulov Castle
- Milotice Chateau
- Miroslav Chateau
- Moravský Krumlov Chateau

== N ==
- Nechvalín Castle
- Neuburg Chateau
- Neuhaus Castle
- Nevojice - hrádek Castle
- Nové Hvězdlice Castle
- Nové Hvězdlice Chateau
- Nové Zámky Chateau
- Nový Hrad u Adamova Castle
- Nový Hrádek Castle

== O ==
- Obřany Castle
- Olomučany Castle
- Orlov Castle
- Osiky Castle
- Oslavany Chateau

== P ==
- Plaveč Chateau
- Pohansko Chateau
- Pouzdřany Chateau
- Pulkov Castle
- Pustiměř Castle

== R ==
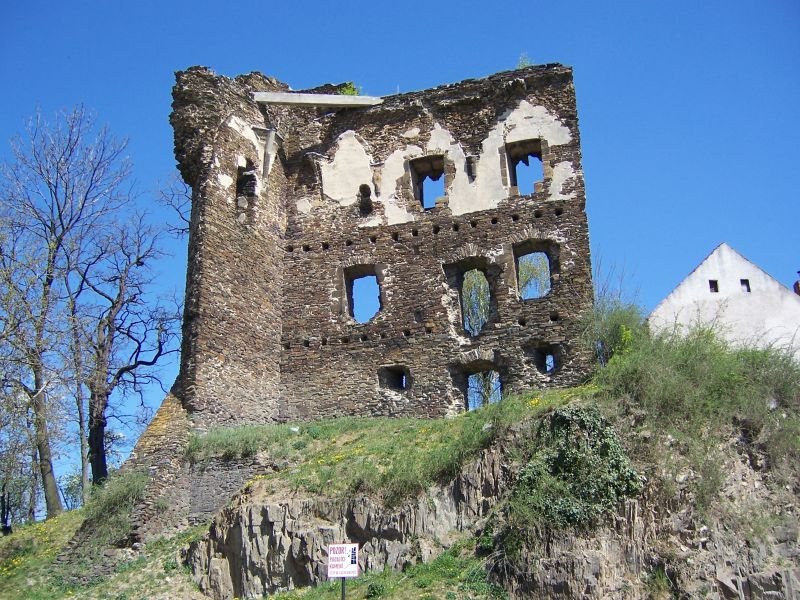
Říčany Castle.

- Račice u Brna Chateau
- Randez-vous Chateau
- Rájec nad Svitavou Chateau
- Rešice Chateau
- Ronov Castle
- Rosice Chateau
- Rumberk Castle
- Rybniční zámeček Chateau
- Rychvald Castle
- Rytířská jeskyně Castle
- Řečkovice Chateau
- Říčany Castle

== S ==
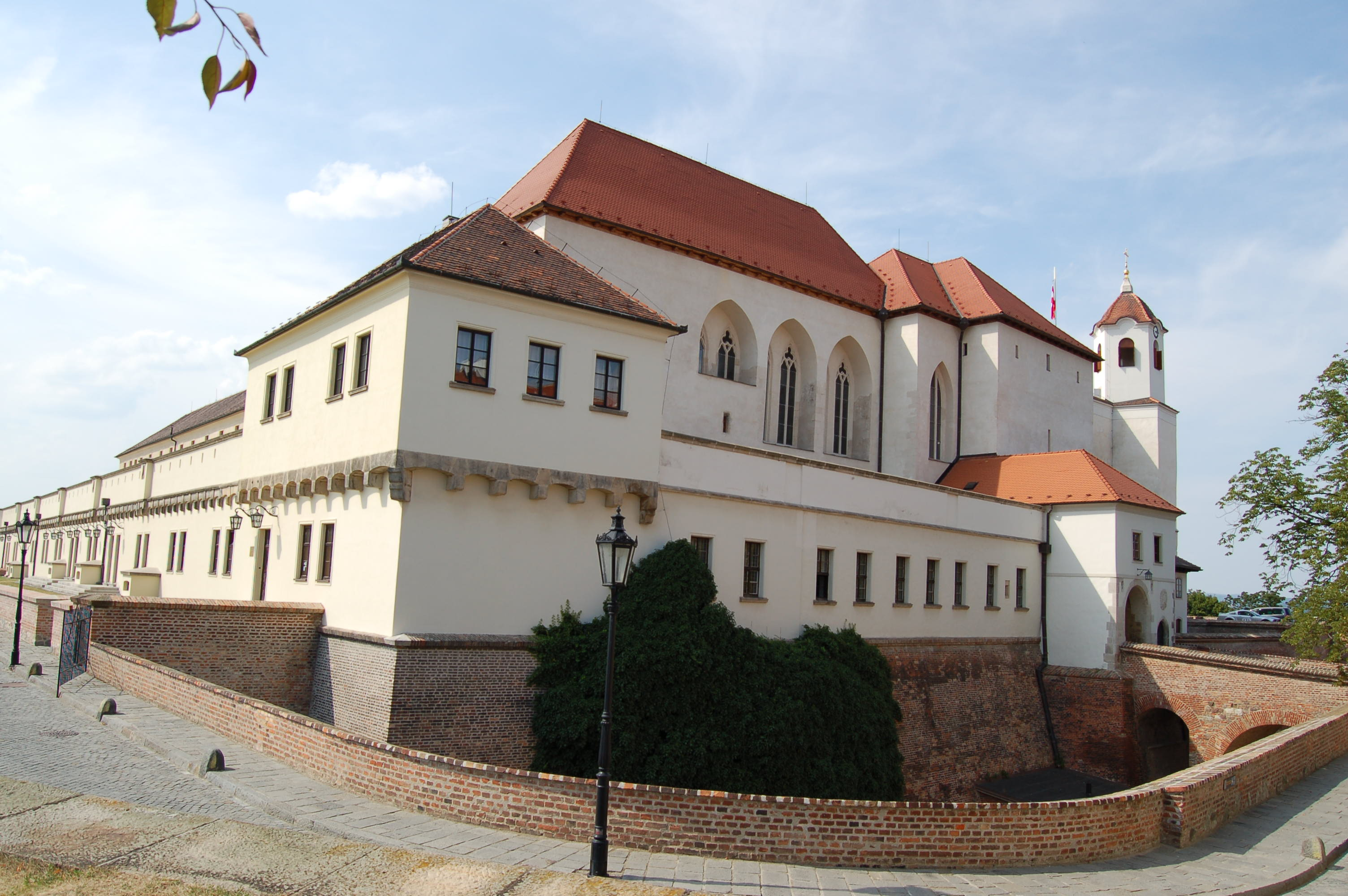
Špilberk Castle.

- Sedlec Chateau
- Sirotčí hrádek Castle
- Slavkov Chateau
- Smilův hrad Castle
- Sobůlky, hrádek v poloze Valy Castle
- Sokolnice Chateau
- Stagnov Castle
- Starý Plumlov Castle
- Strážnice - zámek Chateau
- Svitávka Castle
- Šardice Chateau
- Šebetov Chateau
- Šenkenberk Castle
- Šitbořice Castle
- Šlapanice Chateau
- Špilberk Castle
- Švábenice Castle

== T ==
- Tavíkovice Chateau
- Templštejn Castle
- Těšany Chateau
- Trmačov Castle
- Troyerstein Chateau
- Tulešice Chateau
- Tvořihráz Chateau

== U ==
- Uherčice Chateau
- Uherský Ostroh Castle
- Újezd u Ždánic Castle
- Újezd Chateau

== V ==
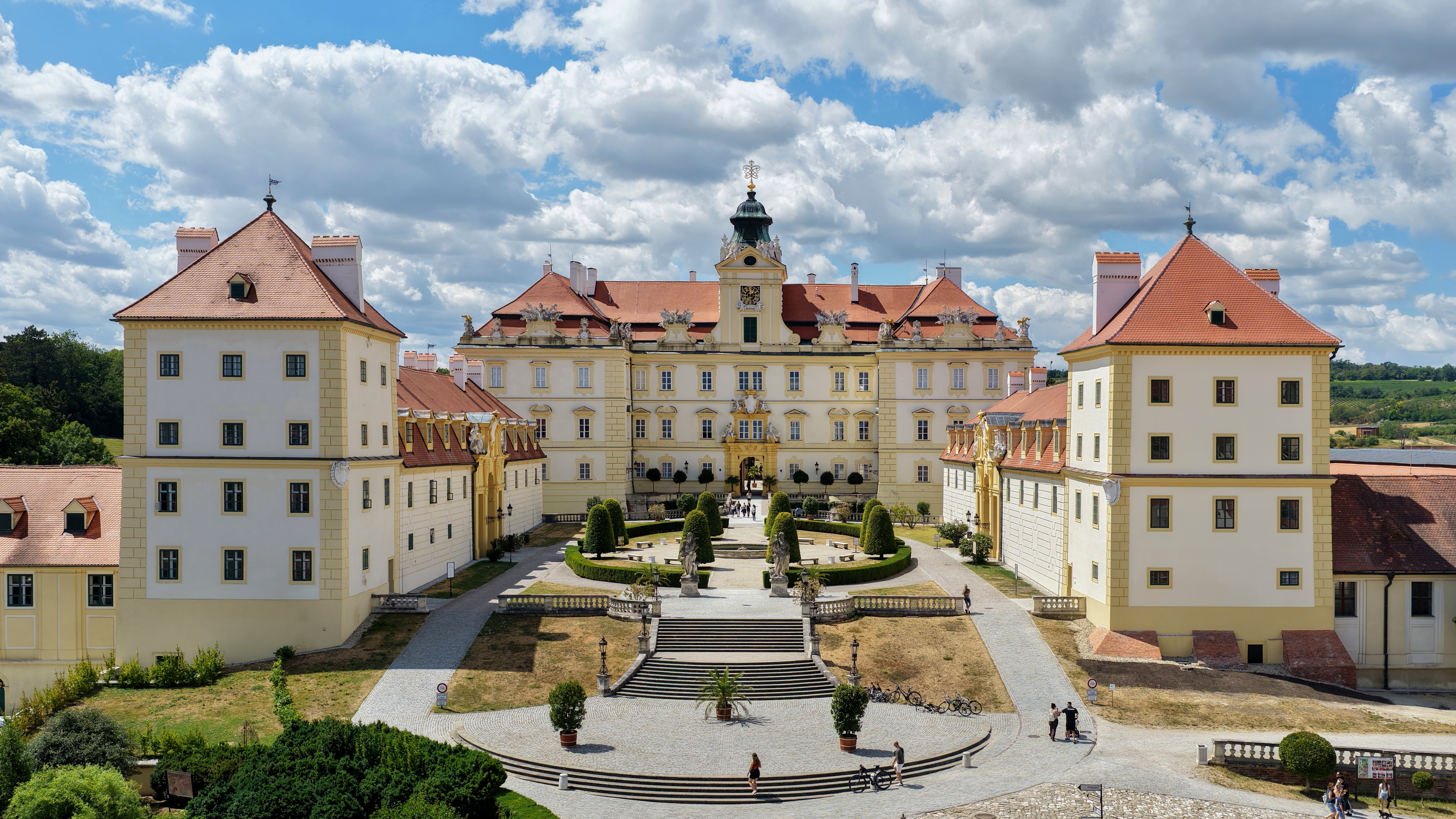
Valtice Chateau.

- Valtice Chateau
- Velké Opatovice Chateau
- Velké Pavlovice Chateau
- Veselí nad Moravou Chateau
- Veveří Castle
- Věteřov Castle
- Vildenberk Castle
- Vícov Castle
- Vítovice Castle
- Vlasatice Chateau
- Vohančice Chateau
- Vranov nad Dyjí Chateau
- Vyškov na Moravě Chateau

== Z ==
- Zbraslav Castle
- Znojmo Castle
- Ždánice - Palánek Castle
- Ždánice Chateau

== See also ==
- List of castles in the Czech Republic
- List of castles in Europe
- List of castles
