= Prokopov =

- Municipality
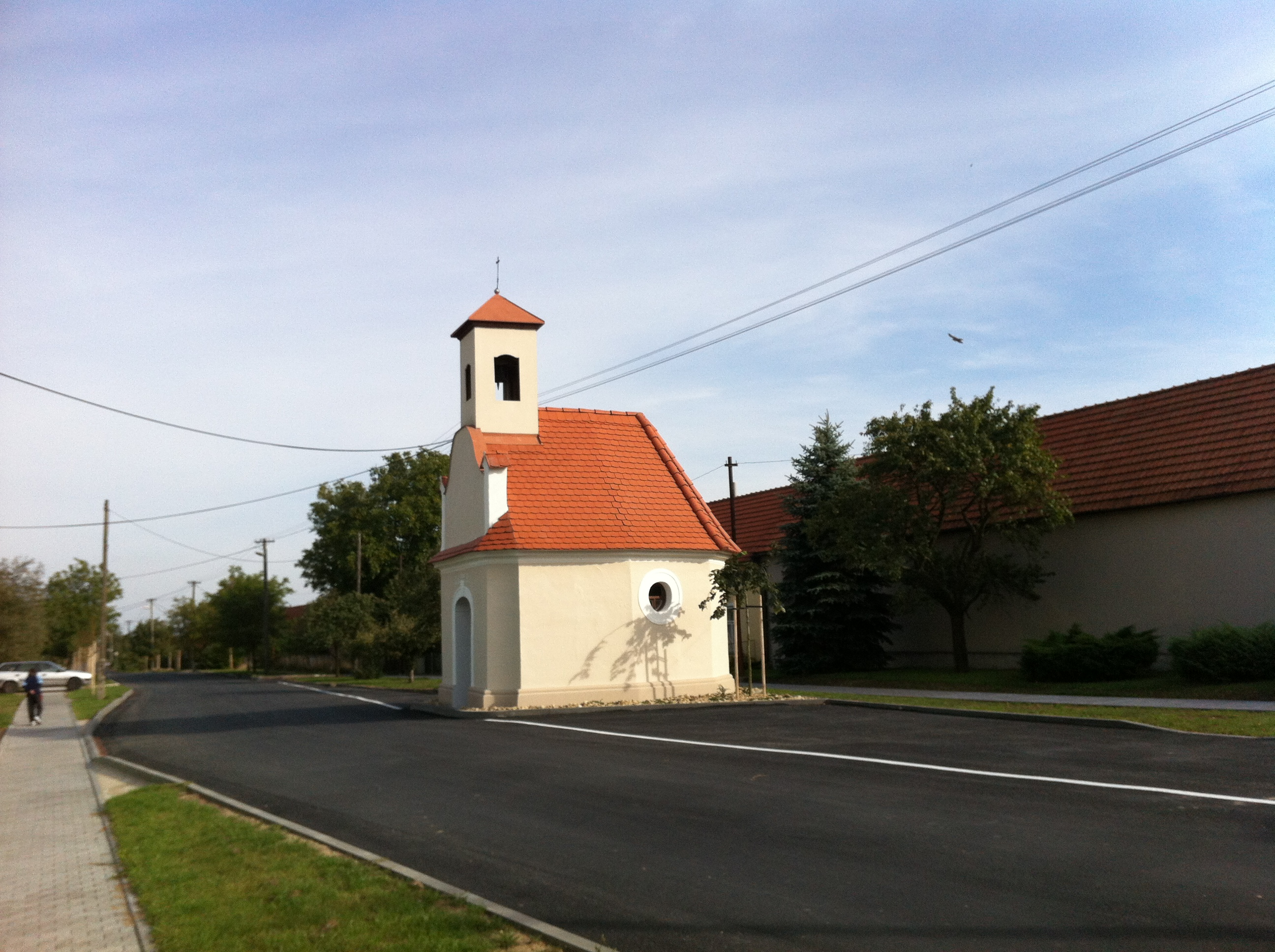
- Chapel of the Virgin Mary

- Flag Coat of arms

- Location in the Czech Republic
- Coordinates: 48°59′54″N 15°53′46″E
- Country: Czech Republic
- Region: South Moravian
- District: Znojmo
- Established: 1789

Area
  - Total: 2.45 km^{2} (0.95 sq mi)
- Elevation: 388 m (1,273 ft)

Population (2026-01-01)
  - Total: 110
  - Density: 45/km^{2} (120/sq mi)
- Time zone: UTC+1 (CET)
  - Summer (DST): UTC+2 (CEST)
- Postal code: 671 54
- Website: www.prokopov.cz

Prokopov (German: Prokopsdorf) is a municipality and village in Znojmo District in the South Moravian Region of the Czech Republic. It has about 100 inhabitants.

== Etymology ==
The village was named after the founder of the village, Count Prokop of Gatterburg.

== Geography ==
Prokopov is located about 18 kilometres (11 mi) northwest of Znojmo and 55 km (34 mi) southwest of Brno. It lies in an agricultural landscape in the Jevišovice Uplands. The highest point is at 410 m (1,345 ft) above sea level.

== History ==
Prokopov was founded in 1789, when 18 houses were built there. A fishpond was built in Prokopov in 1810–1819. Until the establishment of an independent municipality in 1849, Prokopov belonged to the Hostim estate.

== Demographics ==
Historical population

Year	Pop.	±%
1869	207	—
1880	180	−13.0%
1890	168	−6.7%
1900	208	+23.8%
1910	230	+10.6%

Year	Pop.	±%
1921	285	+23.9%
1930	261	−8.4%
1950	180	−31.0%
1961	169	−6.1%
1970	136	−19.5%

Year	Pop.	±%
1980	126	−7.4%
1991	106	−15.9%
2001	95	−10.4%
2011	107	+12.6%
2021	86	−19.6%

Source: Censuses

== Transport ==
There are no railways or major roads passing through the municipality.

== Sights ==
The only protected cultural monument in the municipality is the Chapel of the Virgin Mary. It dates from 1831.
