= Elizabeth, Abbess of Pustiměř =

Illegitimate daughter of Wenceslaus II or Wenceslaus III

- Born: Alžběta Přemyslovna; 1305 or 1280s
- Died: before June 1347
- Religion: Catholicism
- Church: Latin Church
- Offices held: Benedictine Abbess of Pustiměř

Elizabeth (Czech: Alžběta; born before 1288 or between May and 4 October 1305 or before 5 October 1305, died before June 1347) was an illegitimate daughter of Wenceslaus II of Bohemia or Wenceslaus III of Bohemia, and an unknown mother.

== Biography ==
On 9 January 1332, at the request of King John of Bohemia, Pope John XXII allowed Elizabeth, the daughter of the late King Wenceslaus, to leave the Cistercian convent in Pohled and join the Benedictine St. George's Convent in Prague. He also granted her a dispensation for her illegitimate birth and permitted her to hold any monastic office, including that of abbess. The document also mentions that Elizabeth was ill and was born when her father was still unmarried. This suggests that Elizabeth was more likely the daughter of Wenceslaus III (at the time of the document, she would have been at least 27 years old) rather than Wenceslaus II (which would have made her at least 45 years old).

In 1340, Elizabeth became the abbess of the newly founded Benedictine convent in Pustiměř, established by Bishop John Volek of Olomouc. In the founding document, she is described as a relative of the Moravian margrave Charles IV, a co-founder of the monastery, and a sister of John Volek, which would imply she was the daughter of Wenceslaus II. However, this could have been a rhetorical device to emphasize Elizabeth's closer kinship with John Volek than with margrave Charles.

Elizabeth was the abbess of the monastery in Pustiměř until her death, and her successor appeared in June 1347, meaning the illegitimate daughter of the Czech king passed away before that date.
