= Švábenice =

- Market town
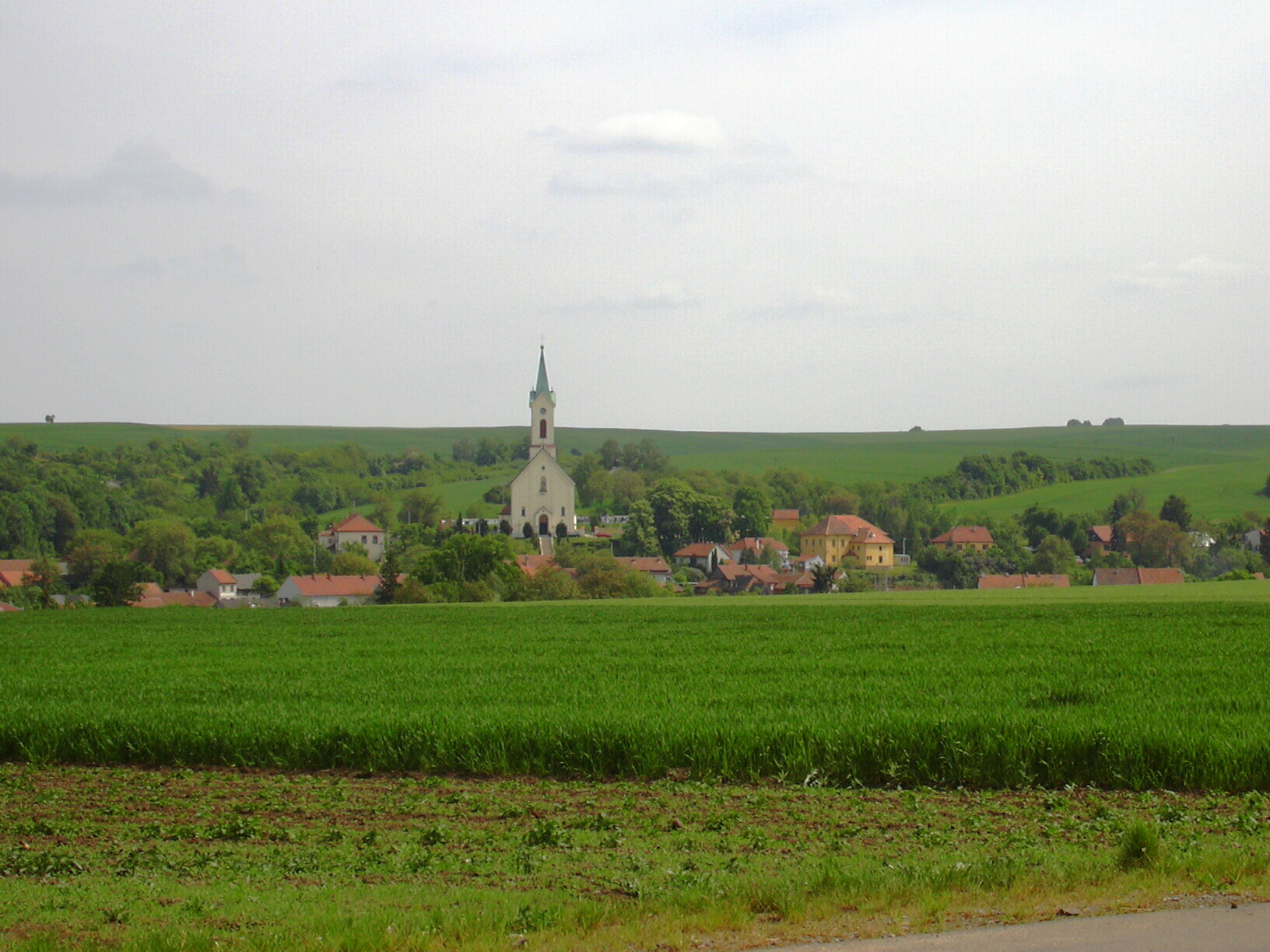
- Panorama of Švábenice

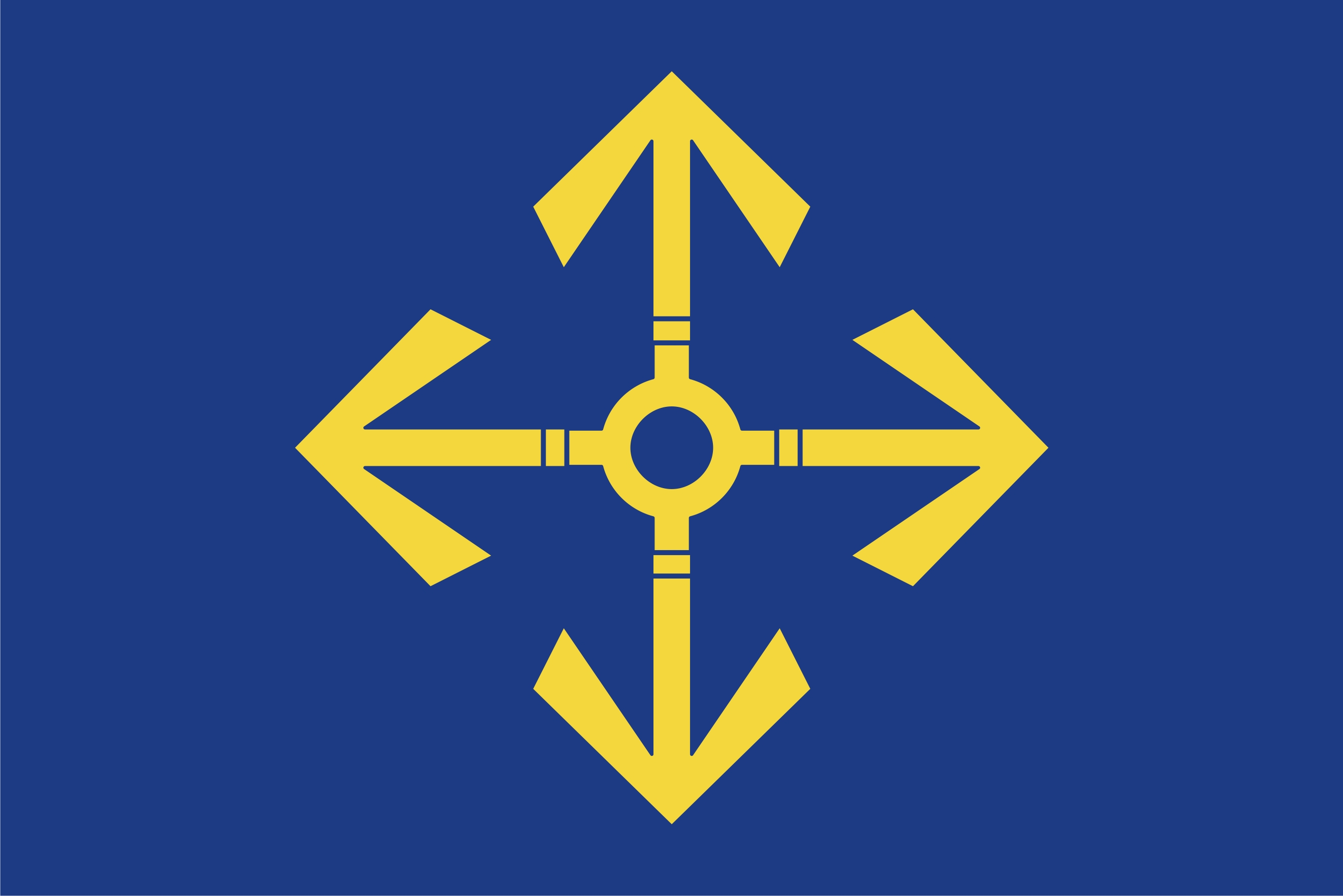
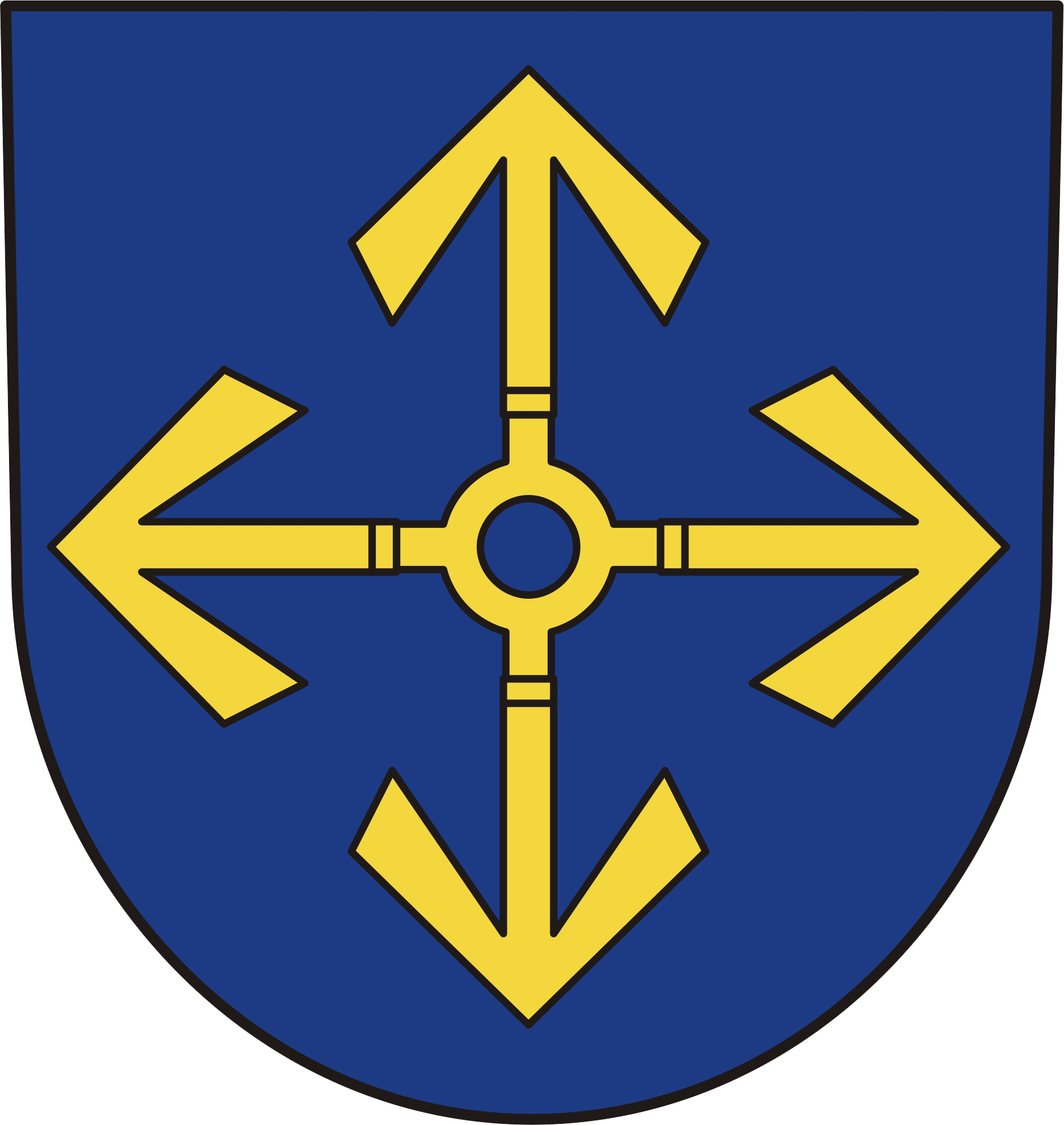
- Flag Coat of arms

- Location in the Czech Republic
- Coordinates: 49°16′42″N 17°7′24″E
- Country: Czech Republic
- Region: South Moravian
- District: Vyškov
- First mentioned: 1170

Area
  - Total: 19.38 km^{2} (7.48 sq mi)
- Elevation: 382 m (1,253 ft)

Population (2026-01-01)
  - Total: 1,052
  - Density: 54.28/km^{2} (140.6/sq mi)
- Time zone: UTC+1 (CET)
  - Summer (DST): UTC+2 (CEST)
- Postal code: 683 24
- Website: www.svabenice.cz

Švábenice (Czech pronunciation: [ˈʃvaːbɛɲɪtsɛ]; German: Schwabenitz) is a market town in Vyškov District in the South Moravian Region of the Czech Republic. It has about 1,100 inhabitants.

== Geography ==
Švábenice is located about 9 kilometres (6 mi) east of Vyškov and 36 km (22 mi) east of Brno. It lies in the Litenčice Hills. The highest point is at 465 m (1,526 ft) above sea level. The stream Švábenický potok flows through the market town.

== History ==
The first written mention of Švábenice is from 1170. It was owned by a local noble family that called themselves Lords of Švábenice. In 1309, they donated the village to the Zderaz Monastery near Prague, but sometime in the next decades they received the village back. In 1377–1400, the village was divided into several parts with different owners. In 1400, the convent in Pustiměř bought almost all the parts, only 11 homesteads remained for the Lords of Švábenice. In 1487, Švábenice was promoted to a market town.

The convent in Pustiměř held Švábenice until its disestablishment in 1588. From 1588 until the establishment of a sovereign municipality, the village was owned by the Olomouc bishopric. The part with the 11 homesteads was bought by the Zierotin family at the end of the 16th century and annexed to the Ivanovice estate, where it remained until the establishment of the Švábenice municipality. During industrialisation in the 19th century, the importance of Švábenice declined because there was no railway through it.

== Demographics ==
Historical population

Year	Pop.	±%
1869	1,260	—
1880	1,308	+3.8%
1890	1,374	+5.0%
1900	1,345	−2.1%
1910	1,363	+1.3%

Year	Pop.	±%
1921	1,362	−0.1%
1930	1,240	−9.0%
1950	1,079	−13.0%
1961	1,110	+2.9%
1970	1,044	−5.9%

Year	Pop.	±%
1980	988	−5.4%
1991	925	−6.4%
2001	930	+0.5%
2011	974	+4.7%
2021	991	+1.7%

Source: Censuses

== Transport ==
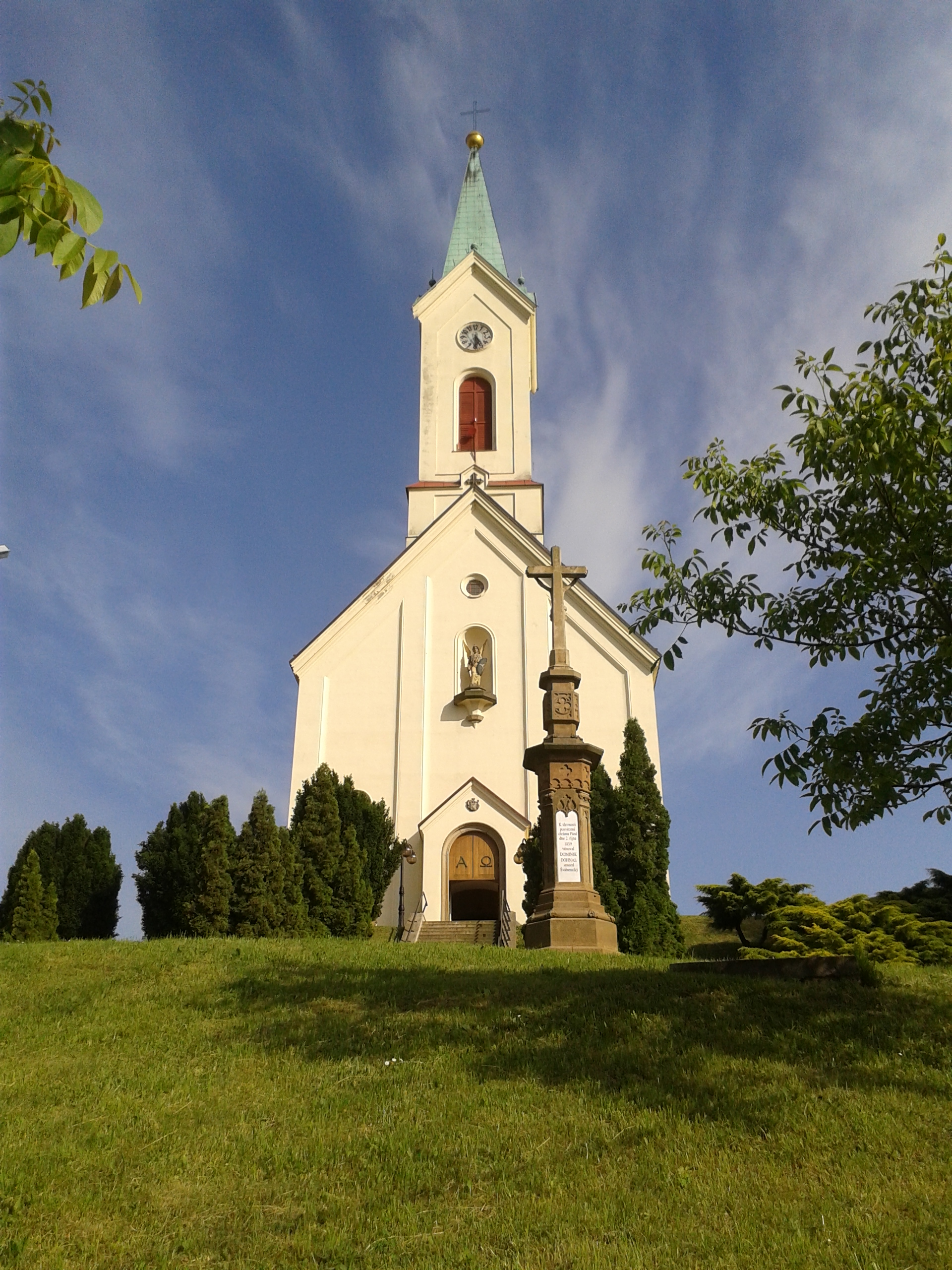
Church of Saint Michael the Archangel

There are no railways or major roads passing through the municipal territory. However, the D1 motorway runs north of Švábenice just outside the municipal territory.

== Sights ==
The main landmark of Švábenice is the Church of Saint Michael the Archangel. It was built in the Baroque style in 1741.
