= Osiky =

- Municipality
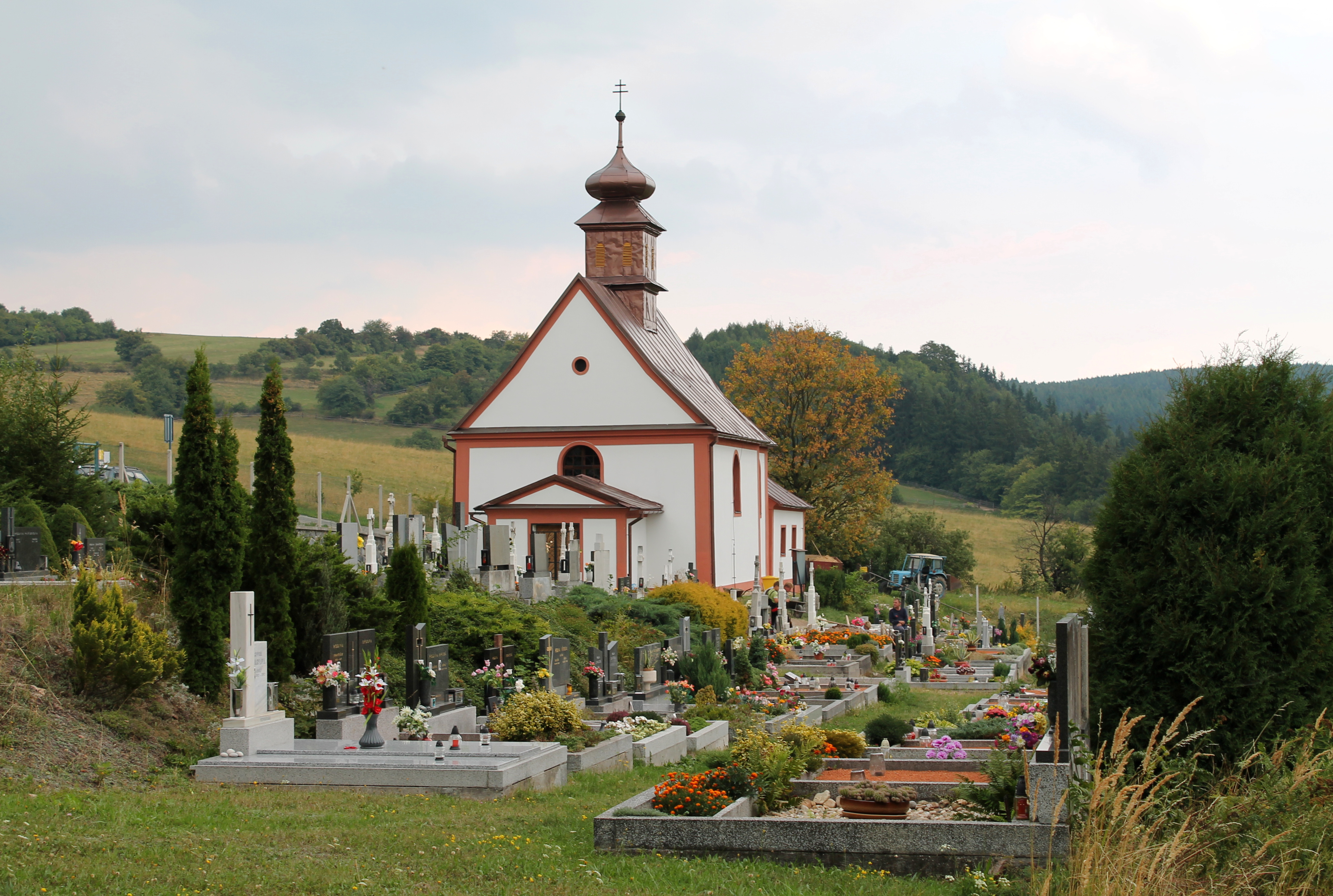
- Church of Saint Stanislaus

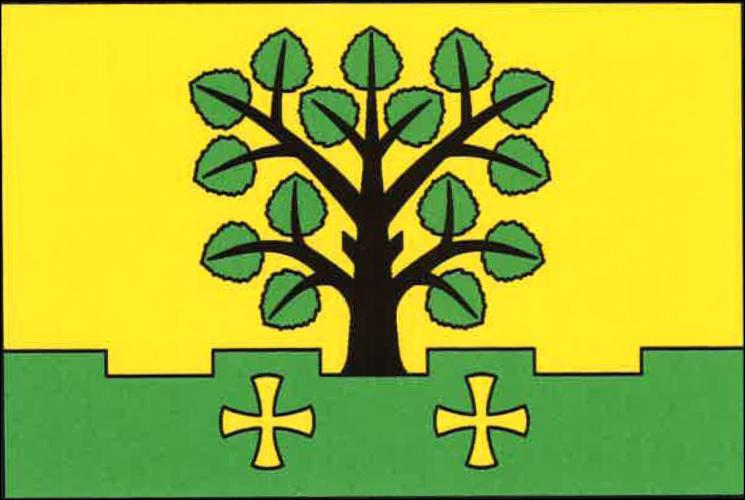
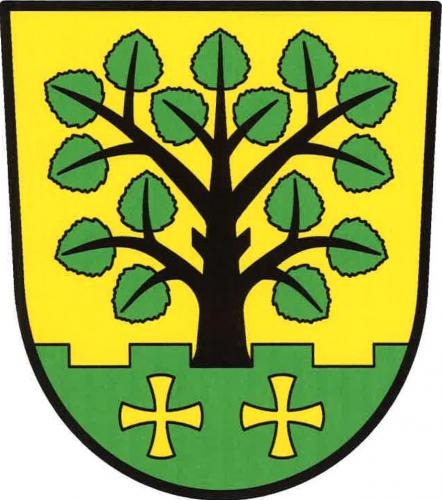
- Flag Coat of arms

- Location in the Czech Republic
- Coordinates: 49°27′22″N 16°25′18″E
- Country: Czech Republic
- Region: South Moravian
- District: Brno-Country
- First mentioned: 1390

Area
  - Total: 7.56 km^{2} (2.92 sq mi)
- Elevation: 577 m (1,893 ft)

Population (2026-01-01)
  - Total: 129
  - Density: 17.1/km^{2} (44.2/sq mi)
- Time zone: UTC+1 (CET)
  - Summer (DST): UTC+2 (CEST)
- Postal code: 679 23
- Website: www.osiky.cz

Osiky is a municipality and village in Brno-Country District in the South Moravian Region of the Czech Republic. It has about 100 inhabitants.

Osiky lies approximately 33 kilometres (21 mi) north-west of Brno and 159 km (99 mi) south-east of Prague.

== Demographics ==
Historical population
Year	Pop.	±%
1869	285	—
1880	269	−5.6%
1890	291	+8.2%
1900	295	+1.4%
1910	300	+1.7%
1921	300	+0.0%
1930	284	−5.3%
1950	232	−18.3%
1961	252	+8.6%
1970	232	−7.9%
1980	198	−14.7%
1991	170	−14.1%
2001	146	−14.1%
2011	119	−18.5%
2021	130	+9.2%
Source: Censuses
