= Lesní Hluboké =

- Municipality
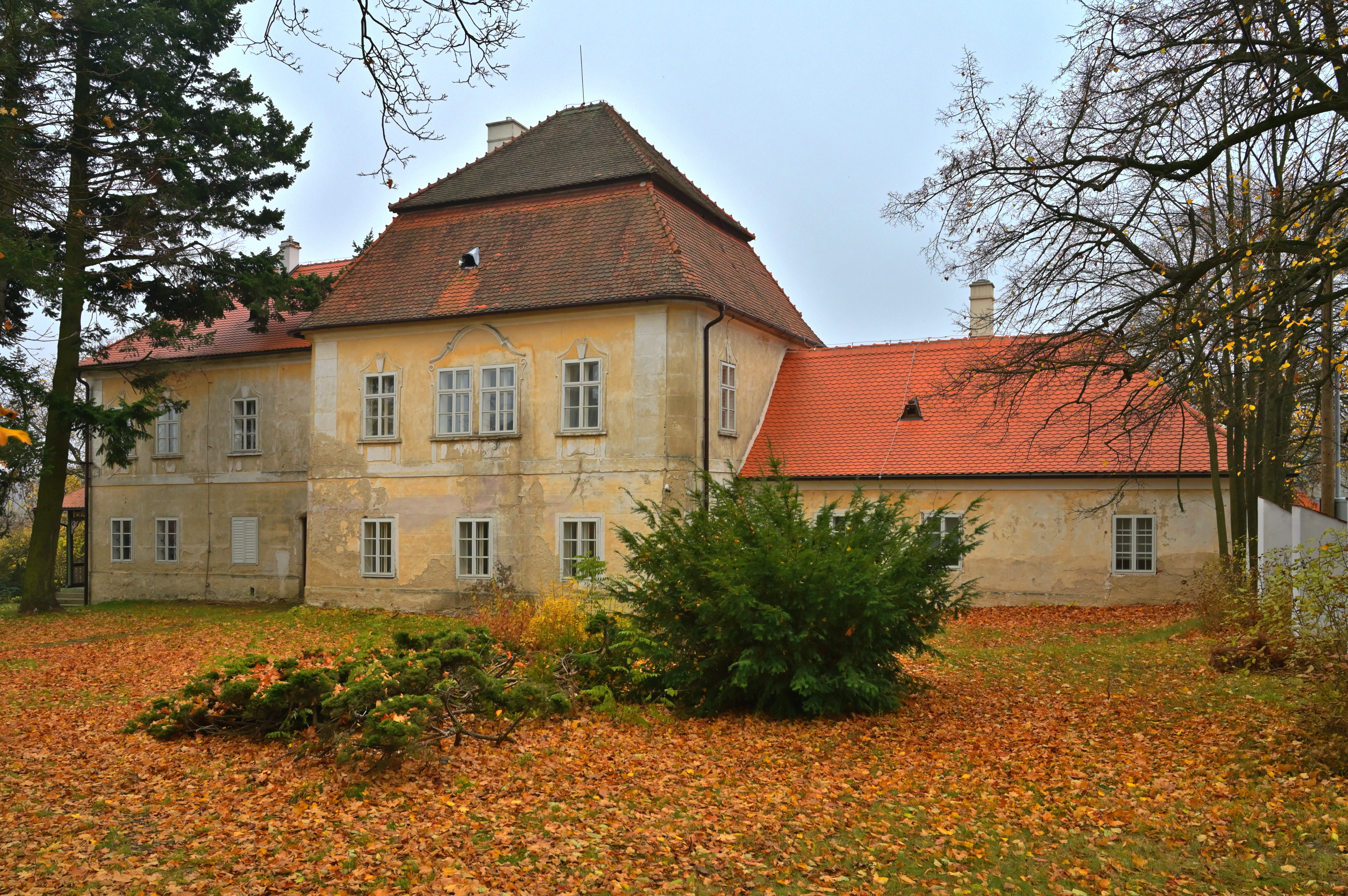
- Lesní Hluboké Castle

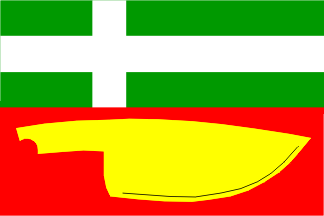
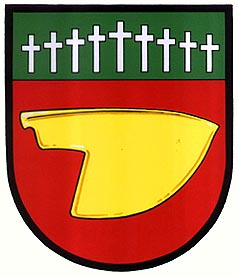
- Flag Coat of arms

- Location in the Czech Republic
- Coordinates: 49°16′7″N 16°18′25″E
- Country: Czech Republic
- Region: South Moravian
- District: Brno-Country
- First mentioned: 1395

Area
  - Total: 4.98 km^{2} (1.92 sq mi)
- Elevation: 503 m (1,650 ft)

Population (2026-01-01)
  - Total: 286
  - Density: 57.4/km^{2} (149/sq mi)
- Time zone: UTC+1 (CET)
  - Summer (DST): UTC+2 (CEST)
- Postal code: 664 83
- Website: www.lesnihluboke.cz

Lesní Hluboké is a municipality and village in Brno-Country District in the South Moravian Region of the Czech Republic. It has about 300 inhabitants.

== Etymology ==
The name Lesní Hluboké literally means 'forest deep' in Czech.

== Geography ==
Lesní Hluboké is located about 21 kilometres (13 mi) west of Brno. It lies in the Křižanov Highlands. The highest point is at 521 m (1,709 ft) above sea level. The village is situated on an elevated plateau above the valleys of the streams Bílý potok and Přibyslavický potok, which flow along the northern municipal border.

== History ==
The first written mention of Lesní Hluboké is in a deed of King Wenceslaus IV from 1395. Silver and iron ore were mined in the area.

== Demographics ==
Historical population

Year	Pop.	±%
1869	221	—
1880	225	+1.8%
1890	227	+0.9%
1900	235	+3.5%
1910	224	−4.7%

Year	Pop.	±%
1921	209	−6.7%
1930	206	−1.4%
1950	192	−6.8%
1961	209	+8.9%
1970	194	−7.2%

Year	Pop.	±%
1980	198	+2.1%
1991	186	−6.1%
2001	161	−13.4%
2011	202	+25.5%
2021	288	+42.6%

Source: Censuses

== Transport ==
The D1 motorway from Prague to Brno runs through the municipality.

== Sights ==
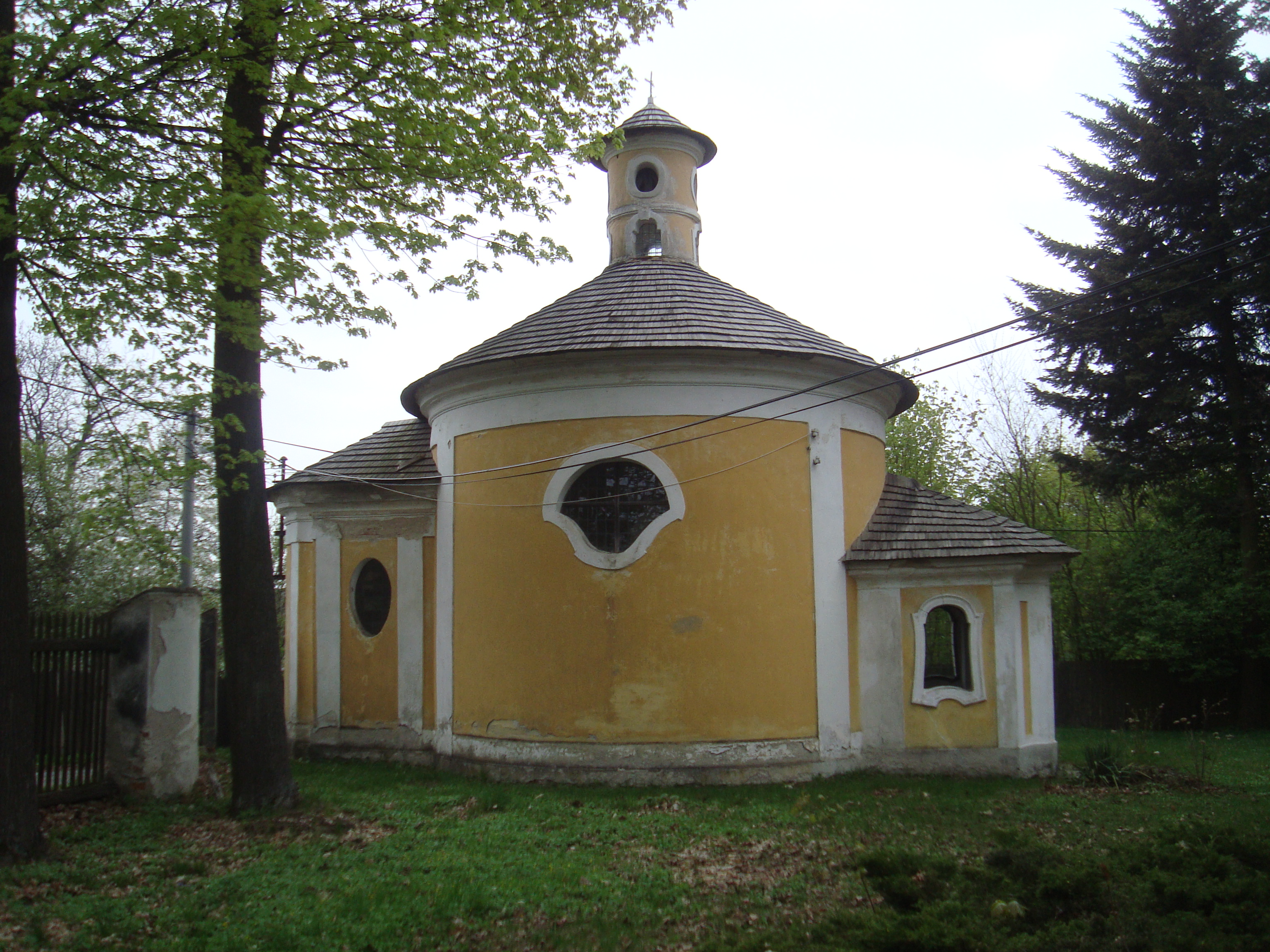
Chapel of Saint Anne

The main landmark of the municipality is the Lesní Hluboké Castle with the Chapel of Saint Anne. It was built in the late Baroque style in 1770. The castle was built by the then-owner of Lesní Hluboké, the monastery in Rajhrad, and was originally used as a hunting lodge and the seat of the administration of the surrounding forests. In 1884, the building was reconstructed and since then it has served as a summer recreation facility for Benedictine monks. The properties of the monastery were confiscated by the state in 1948. In 2015, the castle was returned to the Benedictine community in Rajhrad.

A cultural monument is the set of nine wooden crosses known as Devět křížů. They commemorate nine victims of a mass murder in a wedding party in 1540 (including the perpetrator or perpetrators). There are several legends about what happened here, and the most popular one is that it was committed by Veleslav, a disgraced veteran of the Ottoman wars, and his companion. The crosses have been renovated many times, most recently in 2005.
