= Kravsko =

- Municipality
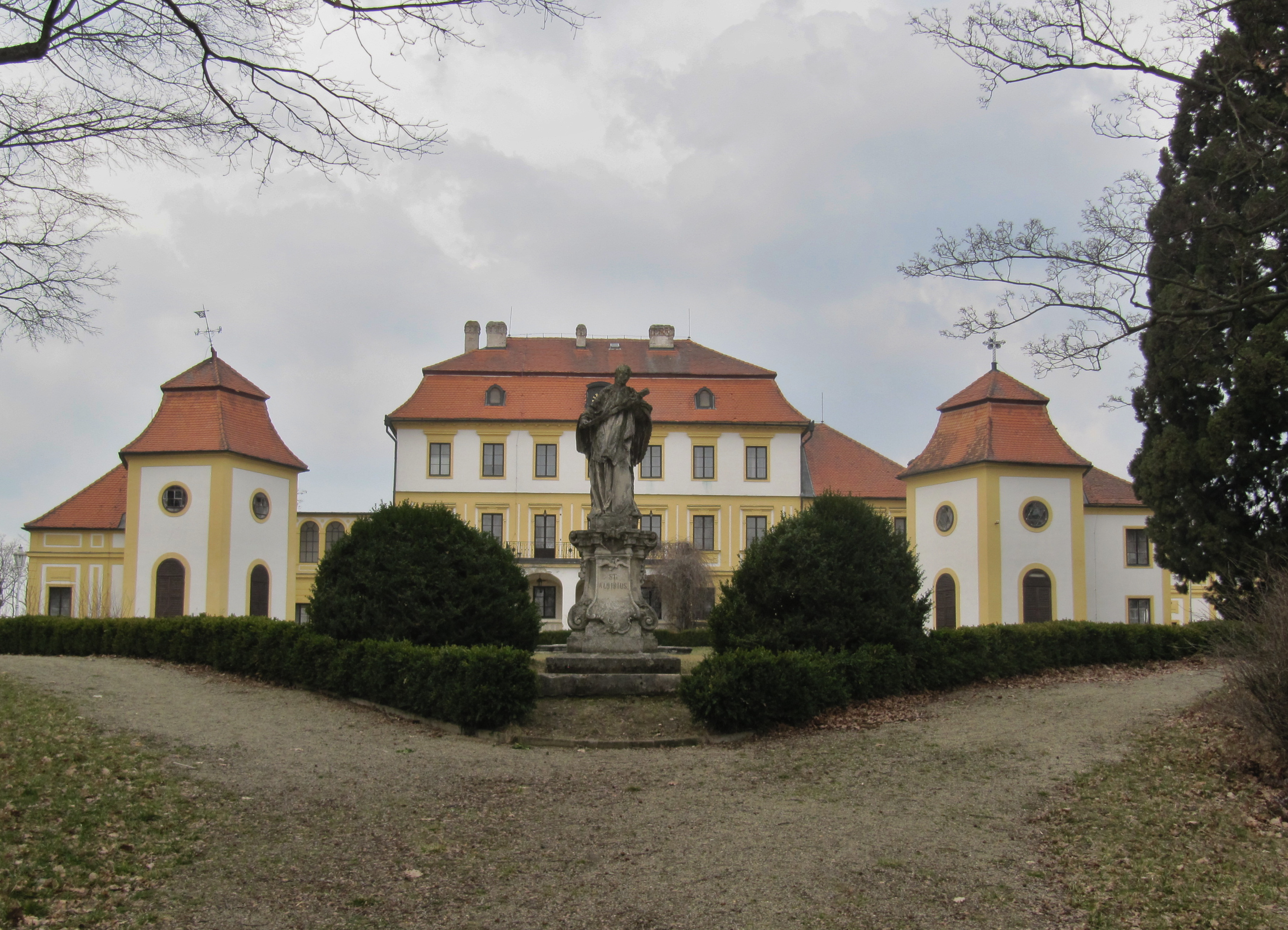
- Kravsko Castle

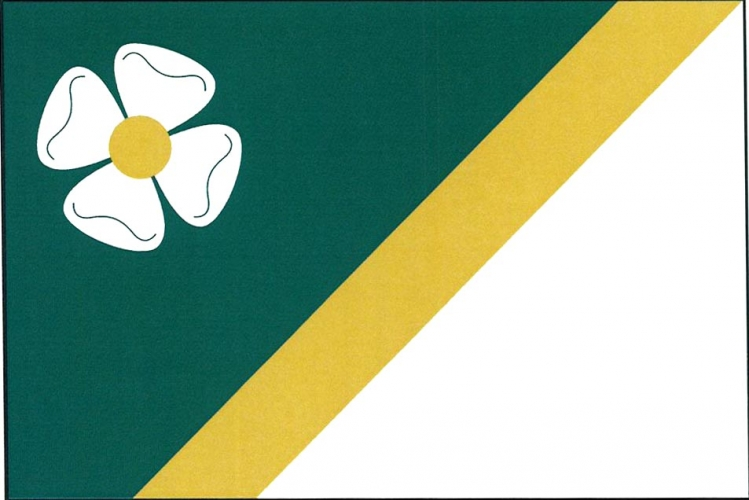
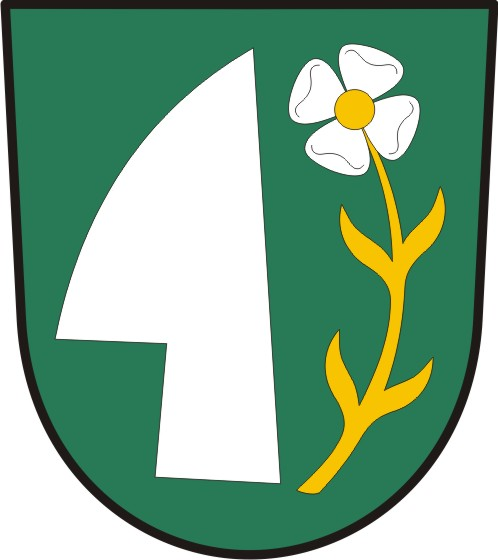
- Flag Coat of arms

- Location in the Czech Republic
- Coordinates: 48°55′18″N 15°59′11″E
- Country: Czech Republic
- Region: South Moravian
- District: Znojmo
- First mentioned: 1092

Area
  - Total: 8.25 km^{2} (3.19 sq mi)
- Elevation: 327 m (1,073 ft)

Population (2026-01-01)
  - Total: 597
  - Density: 72.4/km^{2} (187/sq mi)
- Time zone: UTC+1 (CET)
  - Summer (DST): UTC+2 (CEST)
- Postal code: 671 51
- Website: www.obec-kravsko.cz

Kravsko is a municipality and village in Znojmo District in the South Moravian Region of the Czech Republic. It has about 600 inhabitants.

Kravsko lies approximately 9 kilometres (6 mi) north-west of Znojmo, 56 km (35 mi) south-west of Brno, and 172 km (107 mi) south-east of Prague.

== Demographics ==
Historical population
Year	Pop.	±%
1869	445	—
1880	496	+11.5%
1890	486	−2.0%
1900	560	+15.2%
1910	640	+14.3%
1921	565	−11.7%
1930	592	+4.8%
1950	561	−5.2%
1961	607	+8.2%
1970	566	−6.8%
1980	516	−8.8%
1991	523	+1.4%
2001	517	−1.1%
2011	532	+2.9%
2021	557	+4.7%
Source: Censuses
