= Branišovice =

- Municipality
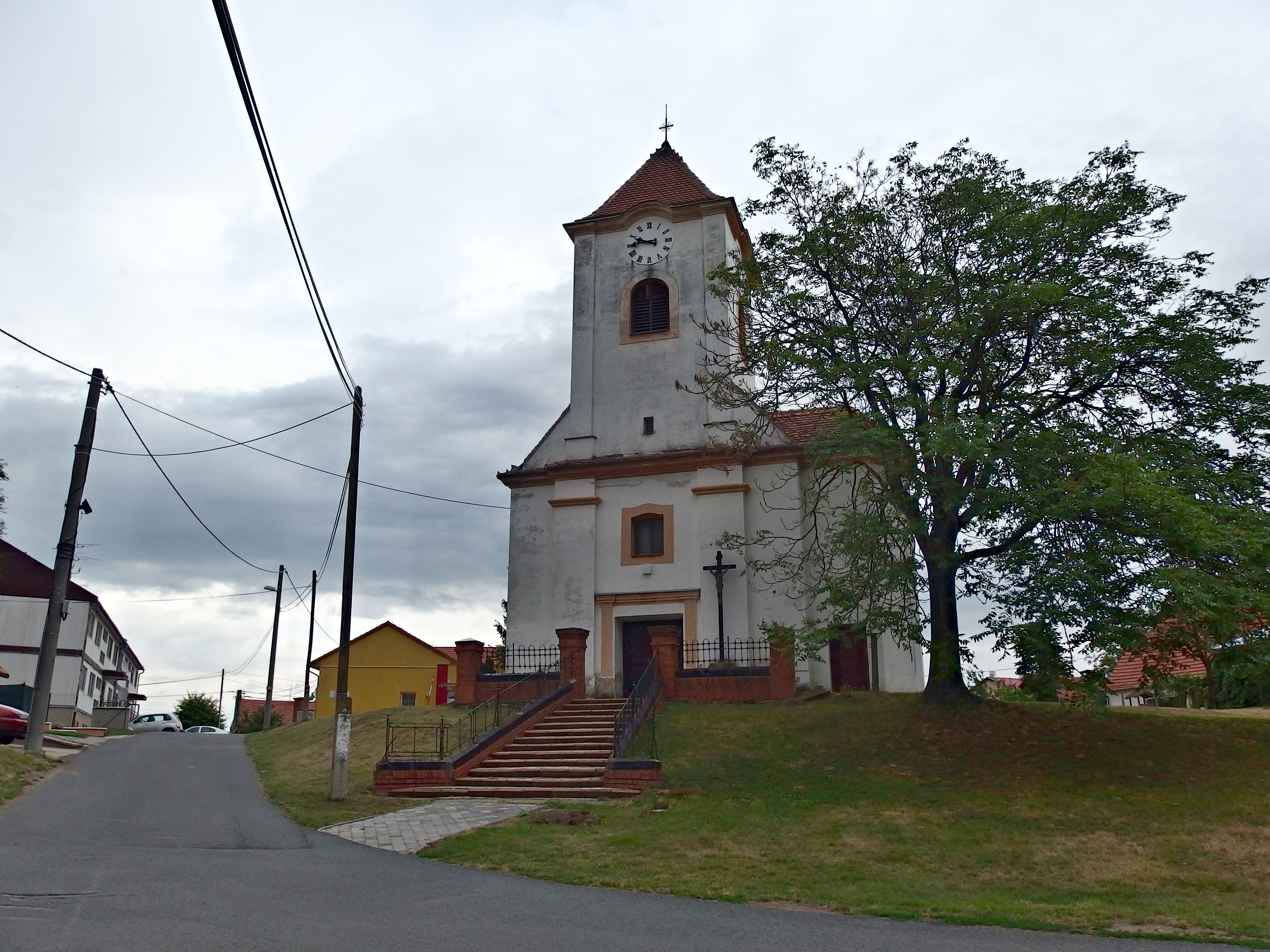
- Church of Saint Lawrence

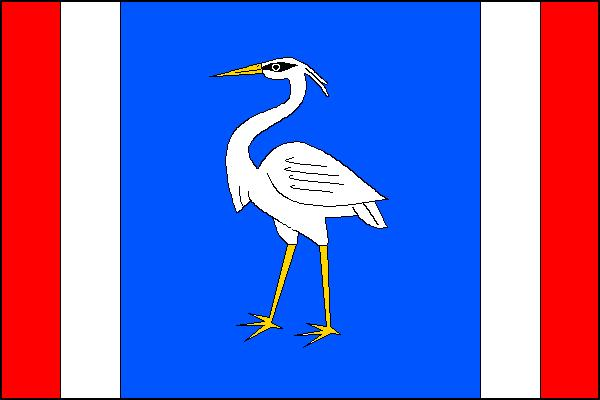
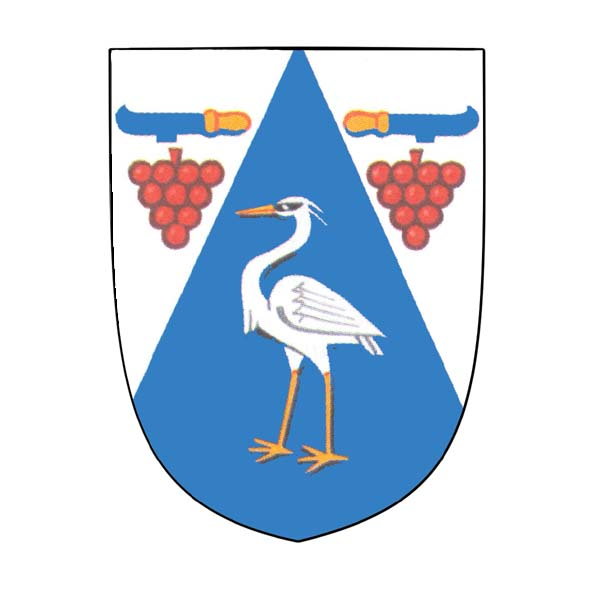
- Flag Coat of arms

- Location in the Czech Republic
- Coordinates: 48°57′46″N 16°25′55″E
- Country: Czech Republic
- Region: South Moravian
- District: Brno-Country
- First mentioned: 1222

Area
  - Total: 11.06 km^{2} (4.27 sq mi)
- Elevation: 194 m (636 ft)

Population (2026-01-01)
  - Total: 641
  - Density: 58.0/km^{2} (150/sq mi)
- Time zone: UTC+1 (CET)
  - Summer (DST): UTC+2 (CEST)
- Postal code: 671 77
- Website: www.branisovice.cz

Branišovice (German: Frainspitz) is a municipality and village in Brno-Country District in the South Moravian Region of the Czech Republic. It has about 600 inhabitants.

Branišovice lies approximately 30 kilometres (19 mi) south-west of Brno and 192 km (119 mi) south-east of Prague.

== Demographics ==
Historical population
Year	Pop.	±%
1869	738	—
1880	814	+10.3%
1890	830	+2.0%
1900	798	−3.9%
1910	852	+6.8%
1921	873	+2.5%
1930	861	−1.4%
1950	518	−39.8%
1961	569	+9.8%
1970	542	−4.7%
1980	554	+2.2%
1991	485	−12.5%
2001	507	+4.5%
2011	553	+9.1%
2021	590	+6.7%
Source: Censuses
