= Šebetov =

- Municipality
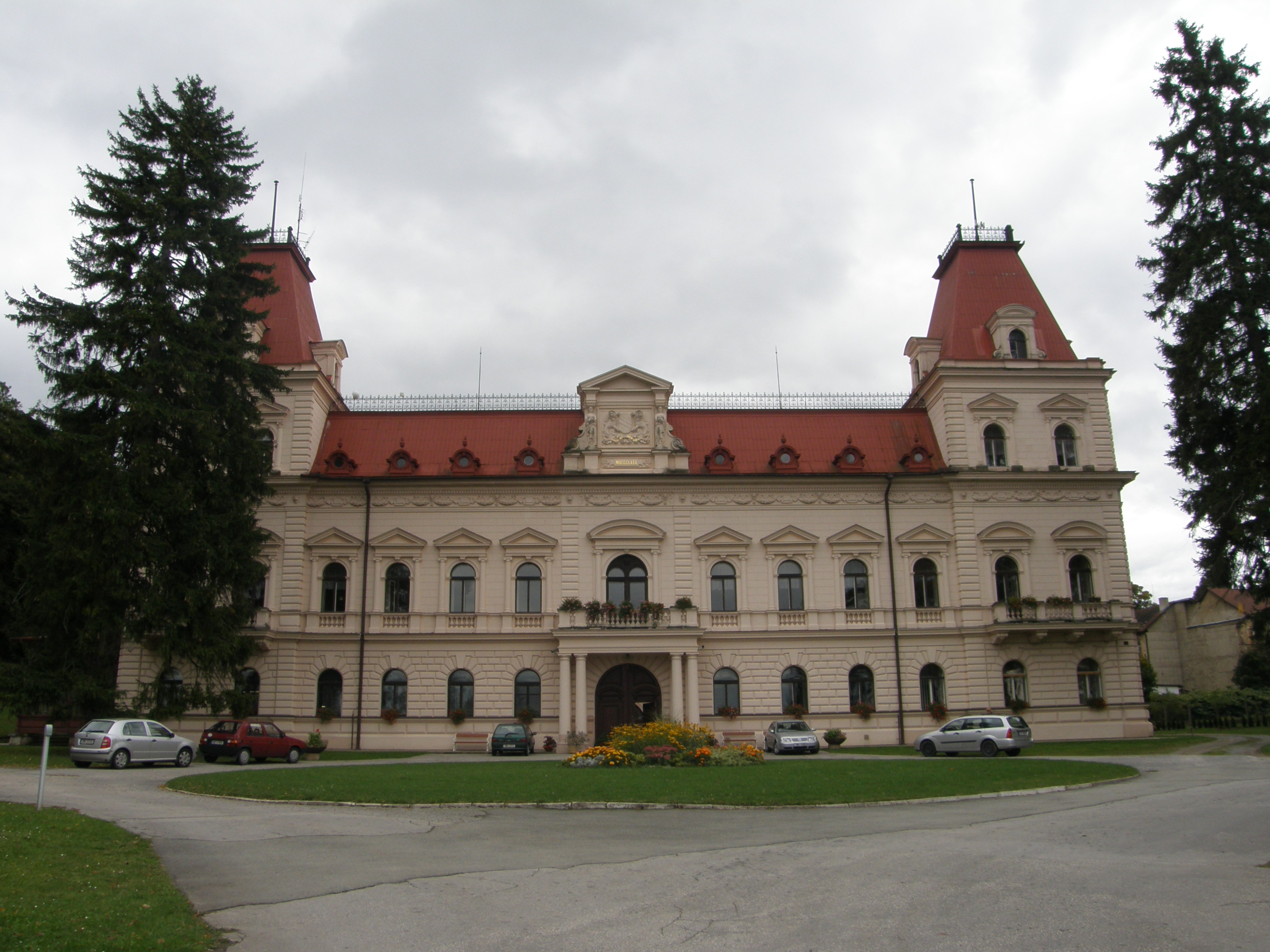
- Šebetov Castle

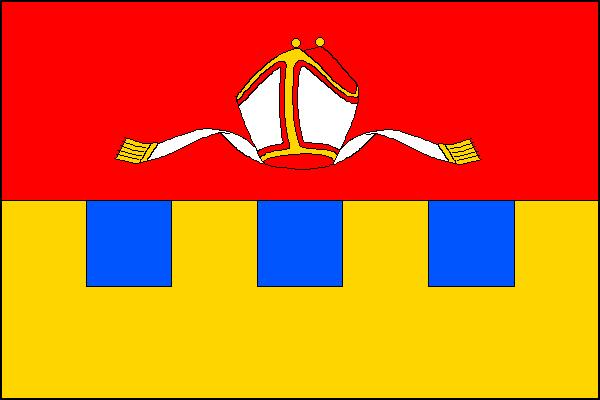
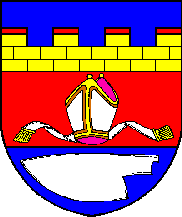
- Flag Coat of arms

- Location in the Czech Republic
- Coordinates: 49°32′55″N 16°42′42″E
- Country: Czech Republic
- Region: South Moravian
- District: Blansko
- First mentioned: 1201

Area
  - Total: 9.41 km^{2} (3.63 sq mi)
- Elevation: 405 m (1,329 ft)

Population (2026-01-01)
  - Total: 826
  - Density: 87.8/km^{2} (227/sq mi)
- Time zone: UTC+1 (CET)
  - Summer (DST): UTC+2 (CEST)
- Postal code: 679 35
- Website: www.sebetov.cz

Šebetov is a municipality and village in Blansko District in the South Moravian Region of the Czech Republic. It has about 800 inhabitants.

Šebetov lies approximately 21 kilometres (13 mi) north of Blansko, 40 km (25 mi) north of Brno, and 176 km (109 mi) east of Prague.

== Demographics ==
Historical population
| Year | Pop. | ±% |
|---|---|---|
| 1869 | 678 | — |
| 1880 | 706 | +4.1% |
| 1890 | 674 | −4.5% |
| 1900 | 694 | +3.0% |
| 1910 | 747 | +7.6% |
| 1921 | 743 | −0.5% |
| 1930 | 699 | −5.9% |
| 1950 | 632 | −9.6% |
| 1961 | 787 | +24.5% |
| 1970 | 780 | −0.9% |
| 1980 | 896 | +14.9% |
| 1991 | 954 | +6.5% |
| 2001 | 936 | −1.9% |
| 2011 | 878 | −6.2% |
| 2021 | 856 | −2.5% |
Source: Censuses
