= Louka (Blansko District) =

- Municipality
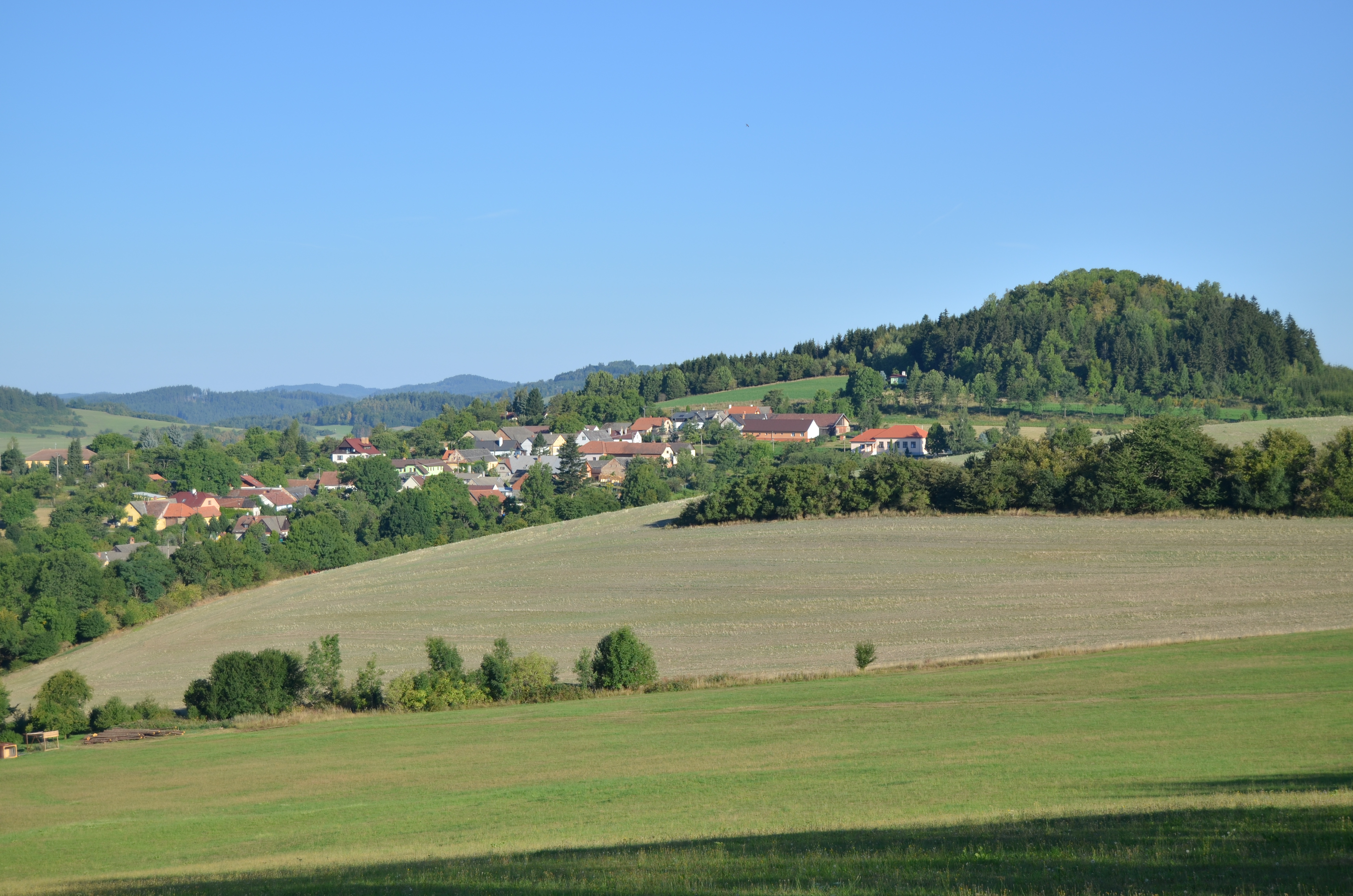
- View from the southeast

- Location in the Czech Republic
- Coordinates: 49°31′45″N 16°25′52″E
- Country: Czech Republic
- Region: South Moravian
- District: Blansko
- First mentioned: 1360

Area
  - Total: 8.53 km^{2} (3.29 sq mi)
- Elevation: 578 m (1,896 ft)

Population (2026-01-01)
  - Total: 62
  - Density: 7.3/km^{2} (19/sq mi)
- Time zone: UTC+1 (CET)
  - Summer (DST): UTC+2 (CEST)
- Postal code: 679 74
- Website: louka-bk.cz

Louka is a municipality and village in Blansko District in the South Moravian Region of the Czech Republic. It has about 60 inhabitants.

Louka lies approximately 24 kilometres (15 mi) north-west of Blansko, 38 km (24 mi) north of Brno, and 158 km (98 mi) south-east of Prague.

== Demographics ==
Historical population
Year	Pop.	±%
1869	282	—
1880	294	+4.3%
1890	280	−4.8%
1900	258	−7.9%
1910	282	+9.3%
1921	285	+1.1%
1930	261	−8.4%
1950	179	−31.4%
1961	203	+13.4%
1970	159	−21.7%
1980	181	+13.8%
1991	104	−42.5%
2001	78	−25.0%
2011	72	−7.7%
2021	57	−20.8%
Source: Censuses
