= Tulešice =

- Municipality
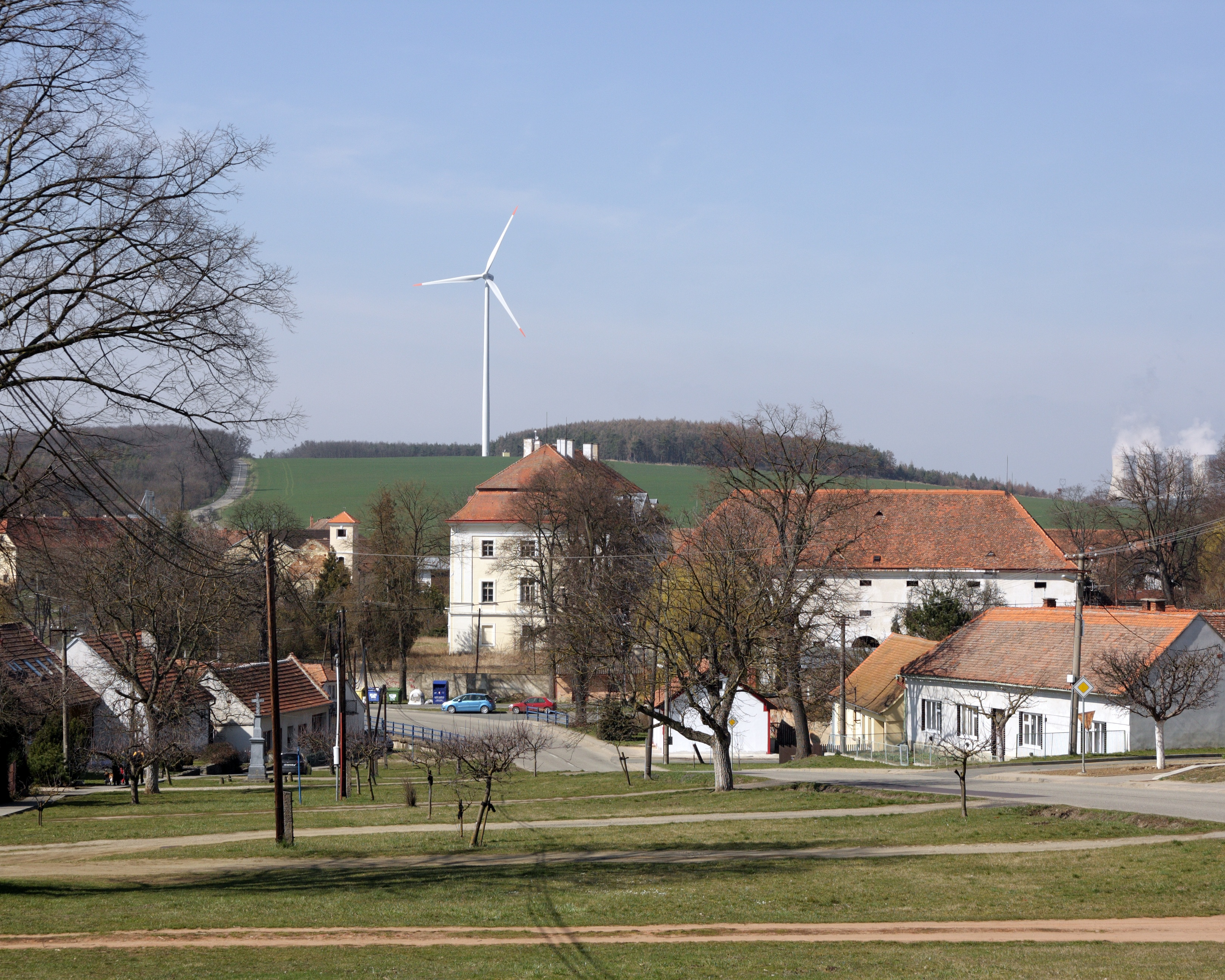
- Centre of Tulešice

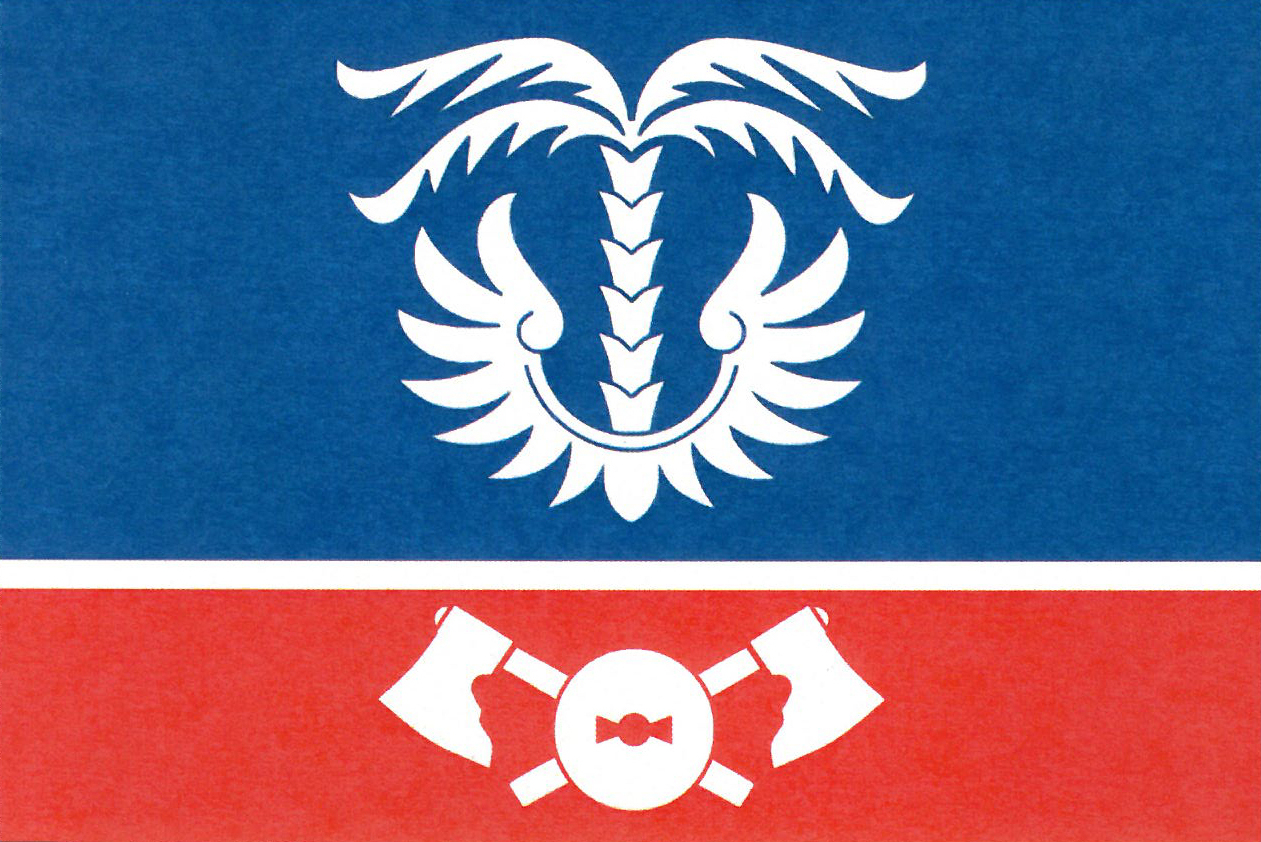
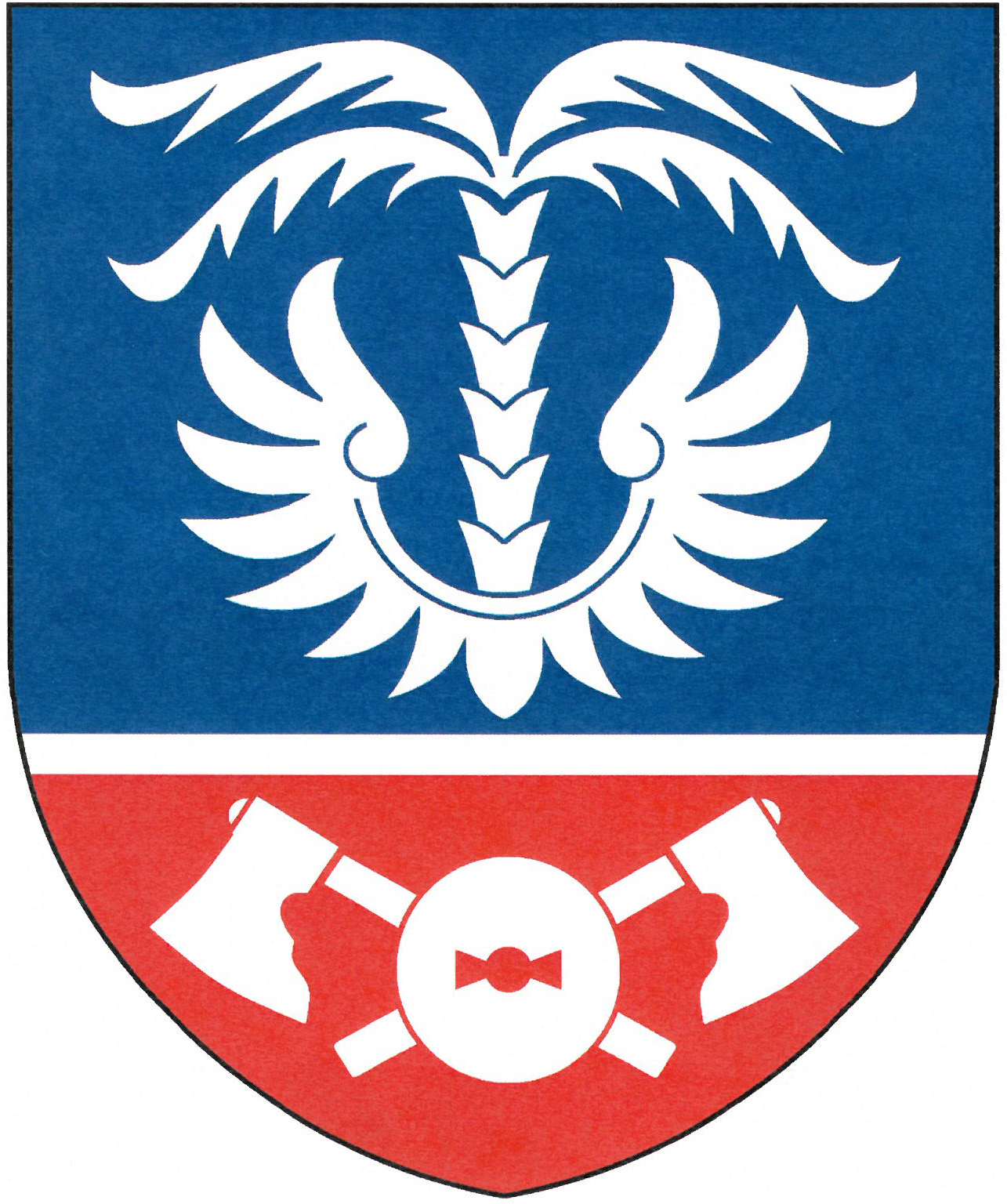
- Flag Coat of arms

- Location in the Czech Republic
- Coordinates: 49°2′19″N 16°12′26″E
- Country: Czech Republic
- Region: South Moravian
- District: Znojmo
- First mentioned: 1365

Area
  - Total: 7.28 km^{2} (2.81 sq mi)
- Elevation: 304 m (997 ft)

Population (2026-01-01)
  - Total: 205
  - Density: 28.2/km^{2} (72.9/sq mi)
- Time zone: UTC+1 (CET)
  - Summer (DST): UTC+2 (CEST)
- Postal code: 671 73
- Website: www.obec-tulesice.cz

Tulešice is a municipality and village in Znojmo District in the South Moravian Region of the Czech Republic. It has about 200 inhabitants.

== Demographics ==
Historical population
Year	Pop.	±%
1869	329	—
1880	355	+7.9%
1890	390	+9.9%
1900	347	−11.0%
1910	363	+4.6%
1921	346	−4.7%
1930	385	+11.3%
1950	336	−12.7%
1961	430	+28.0%
1970	416	−3.3%
1980	360	−13.5%
1991	306	−15.0%
2001	207	−32.4%
2011	173	−16.4%
2021	193	+11.6%
Source: Censuses
