= Deblín =

Market town in the Czech Republic

- Market town
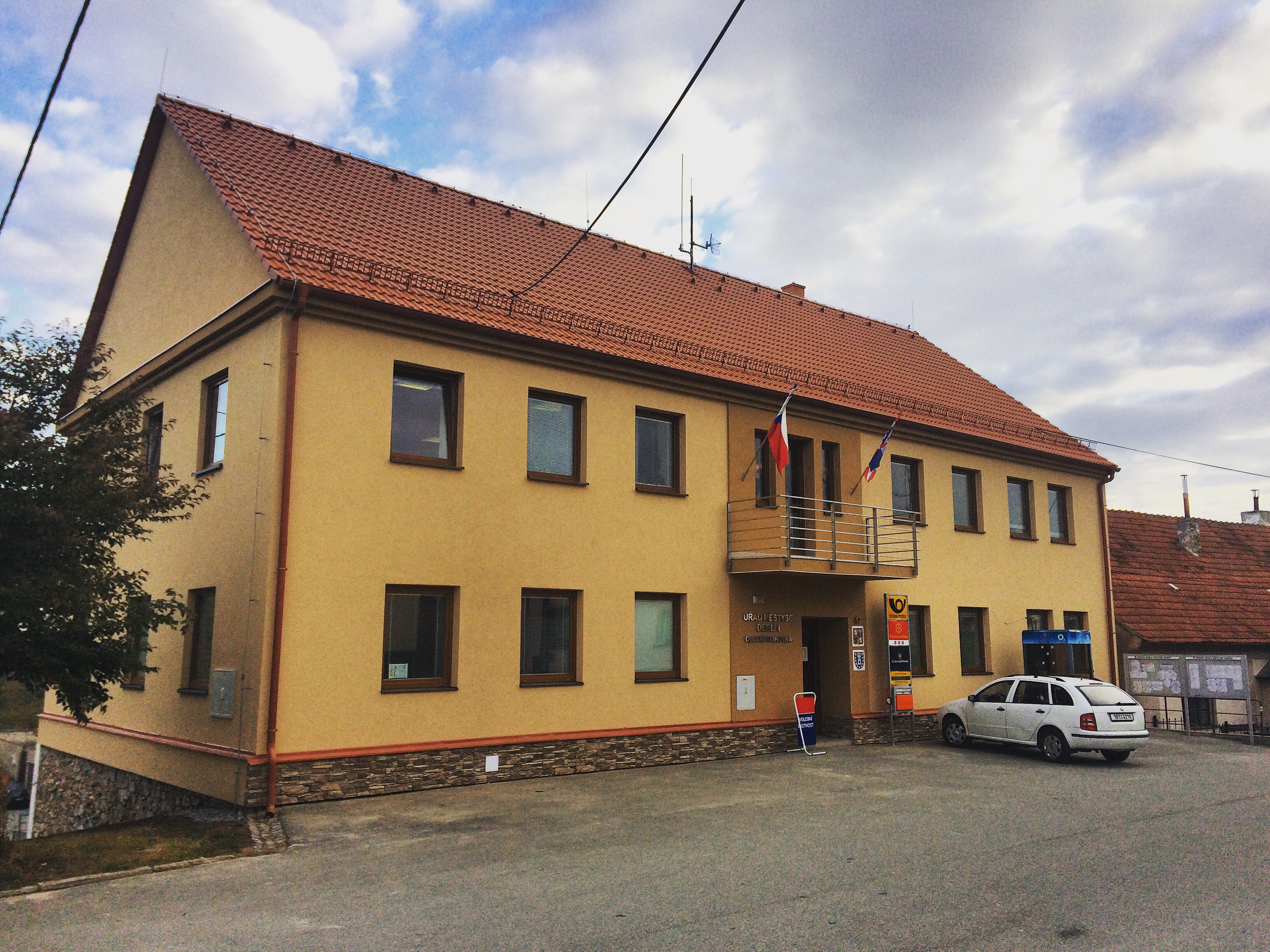
- Municipal office

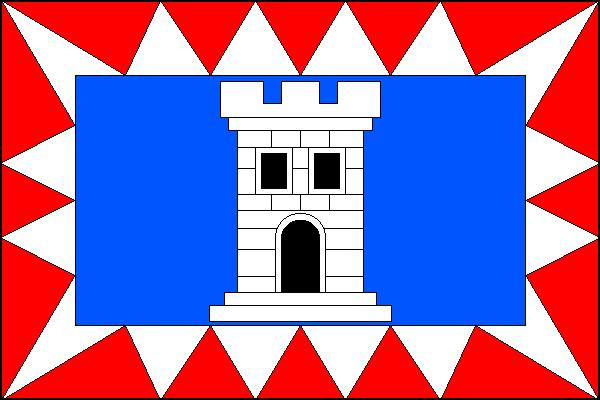
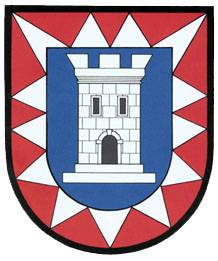
- Flag Coat of arms

- Location in the Czech Republic
- Coordinates: 49°19′13″N 16°20′47″E
- Country: Czech Republic
- Region: South Moravian
- District: Brno-Country
- First mentioned: 1173

Area
  - Total: 14.88 km^{2} (5.75 sq mi)
- Elevation: 475 m (1,558 ft)

Population (2026-01-01)
  - Total: 1,131
  - Density: 76.01/km^{2} (196.9/sq mi)
- Time zone: UTC+1 (CET)
  - Summer (DST): UTC+2 (CEST)
- Postal codes: 664 75, 666 01
- Website: www.deblin.cz

Deblín (Czech pronunciation: [ˈdɛbliːn]) is a market town in Brno-Country District in the South Moravian Region of the Czech Republic. It has about 1,100 inhabitants.

== Geography ==
Deblín is located about 21 kilometres (13 mi) northwest of Brno. It lies in the Křižanov Highlands. The highest point is the hill V Koutě at 511 m (1,677 ft) above sea level. The Závistka Stream originates here and flows through the village.

== History ==
The first written mention of Deblín is from 1173, when a castle with a Romanesque-Gothic basilica stood here.

== Demographics ==
Historical population

Year	Pop.	±%
1869	1,122	—
1880	1,202	+7.1%
1890	1,115	−7.2%
1900	1,064	−4.6%
1910	1,159	+8.9%

Year	Pop.	±%
1921	1,130	−2.5%
1930	1,191	+5.4%
1950	1,040	−12.7%
1961	1,143	+9.9%
1970	1,105	−3.3%

Year	Pop.	±%
1980	1,035	−6.3%
1991	912	−11.9%
2001	935	+2.5%
2011	992	+6.1%
2021	1,058	+6.7%

Source: Censuses

== Transport ==
There are no railways or major roads passing through the municipality.

== Sights ==
The main landmark of Deblín is the Church of Saint Nicholas. It was built on the site of the original basilica and despite its Gothic-Baroque style, it has some Romanesque elements.
