= Vohančice =

- Municipality
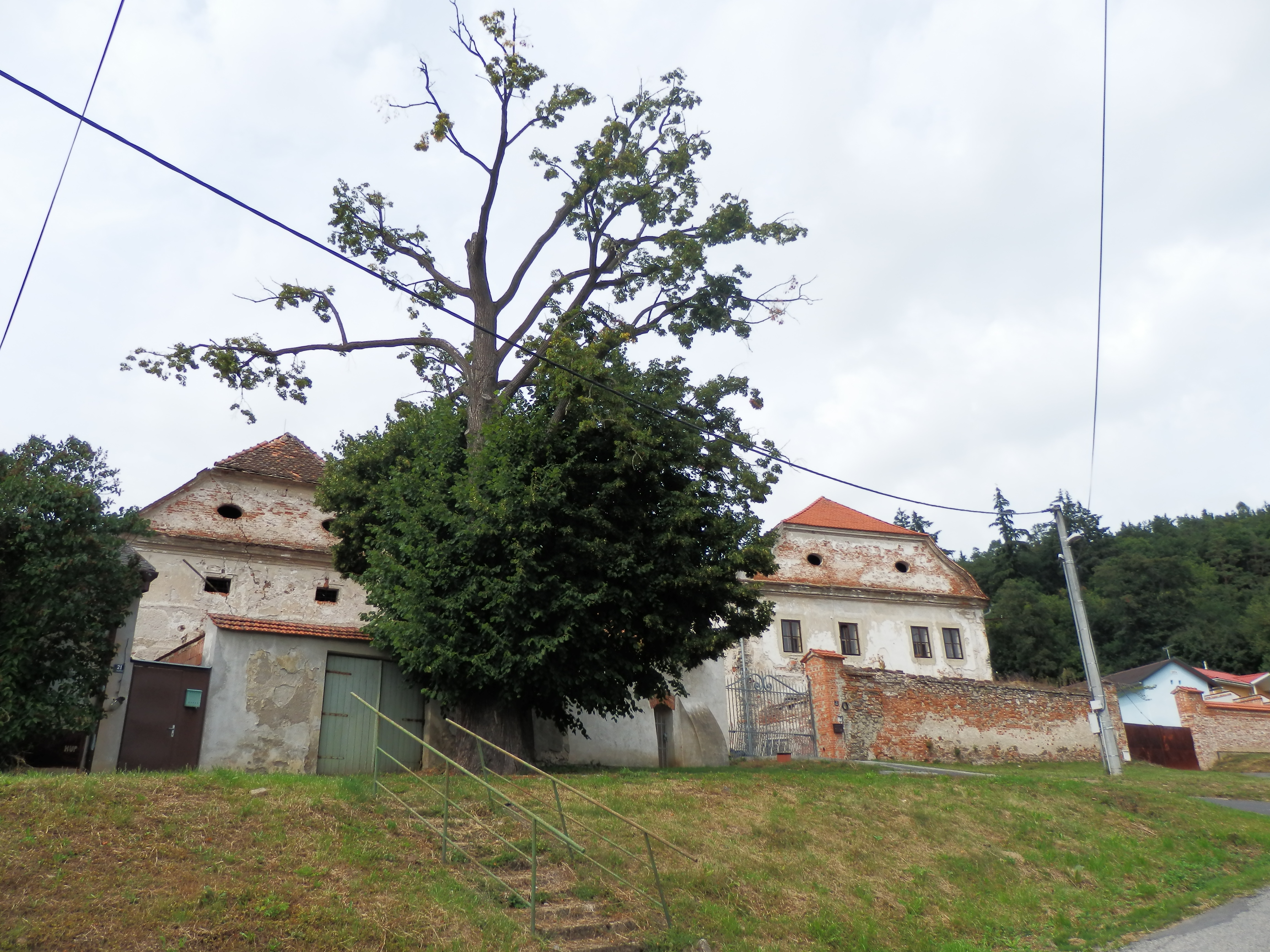
- Vohančice Castle

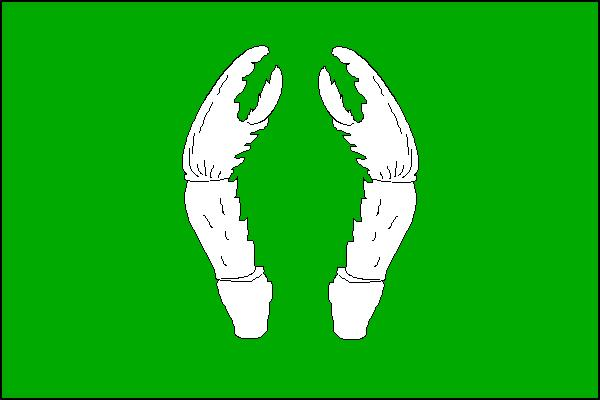
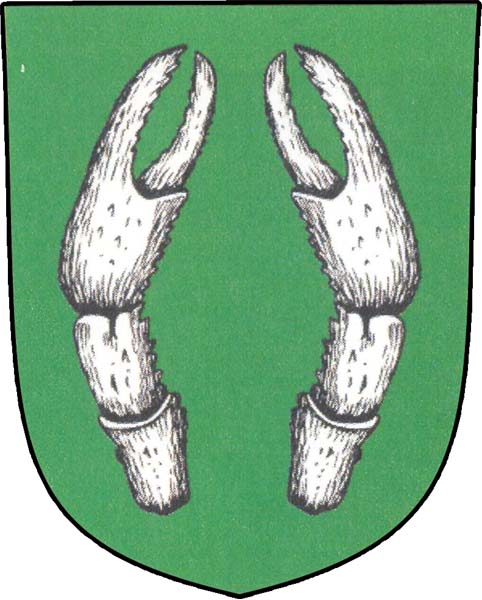
- Flag Coat of arms

- Location in the Czech Republic
- Coordinates: 49°19′18″N 16°23′38″E
- Country: Czech Republic
- Region: South Moravian
- District: Brno-Country
- First mentioned: 1255

Area
  - Total: 3.39 km^{2} (1.31 sq mi)
- Elevation: 324 m (1,063 ft)

Population (2026-01-01)
  - Total: 194
  - Density: 57.2/km^{2} (148/sq mi)
- Time zone: UTC+1 (CET)
  - Summer (DST): UTC+2 (CEST)
- Postal code: 666 01
- Website: www.vohancice.cz

Vohančice is a municipality and village in Brno-Country District in the South Moravian Region of the Czech Republic. It has about 200 inhabitants.

Vohančice lies approximately 22 kilometres (14 mi) north-west of Brno and 166 km (103 mi) south-east of Prague.

== Demographics ==
Historical population
Year	Pop.	±%
1869	177	—
1880	156	−11.9%
1890	185	+18.6%
1900	188	+1.6%
1910	190	+1.1%
1921	187	−1.6%
1930	198	+5.9%
1950	176	−11.1%
1961	190	+8.0%
1970	164	−13.7%
1980	145	−11.6%
1991	118	−18.6%
2001	123	+4.2%
2011	169	+37.4%
2021	197	+16.6%
Source: Censuses
