= Nechvalín =

- Municipality
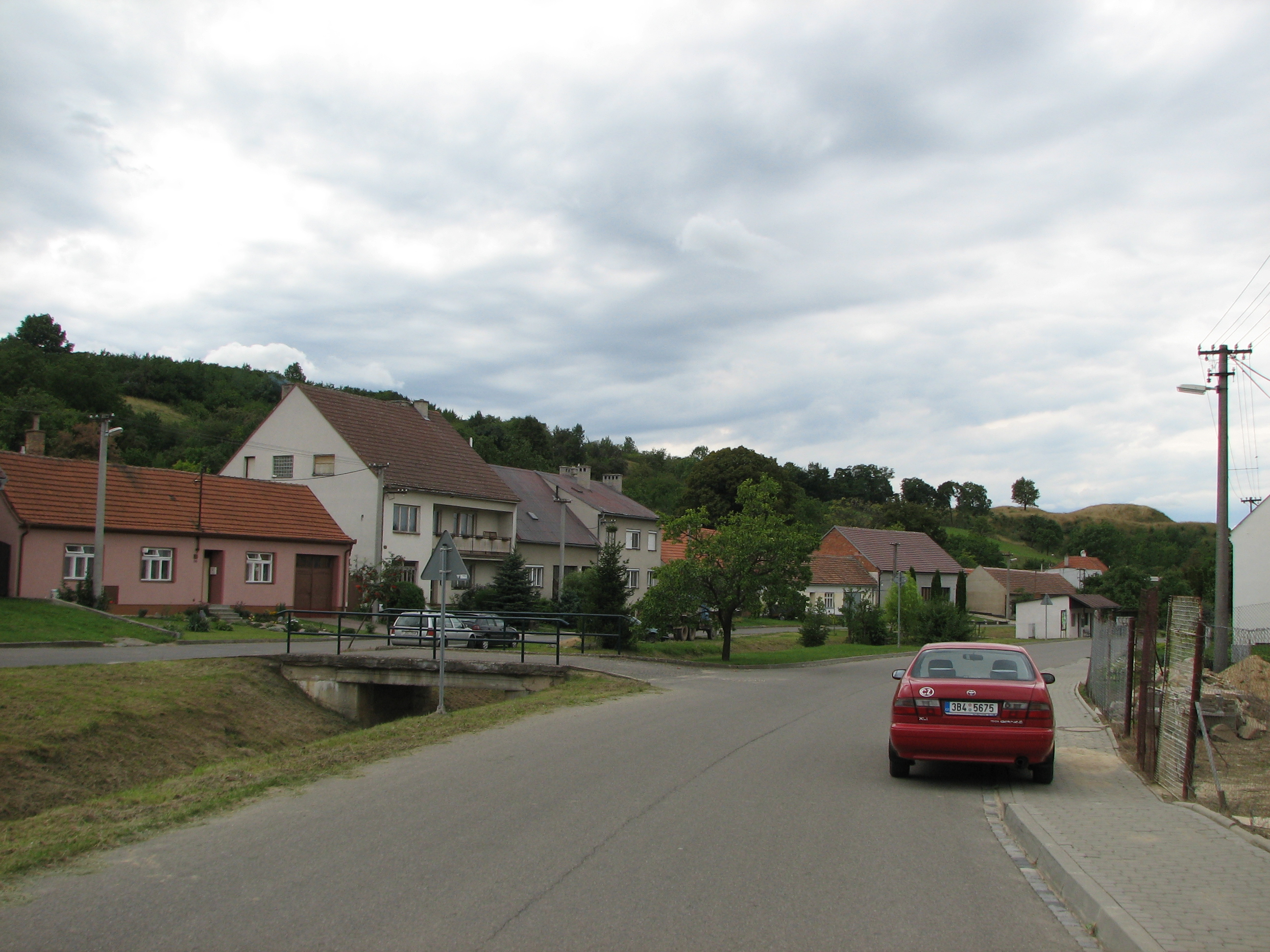
- Centre of Nechvalín

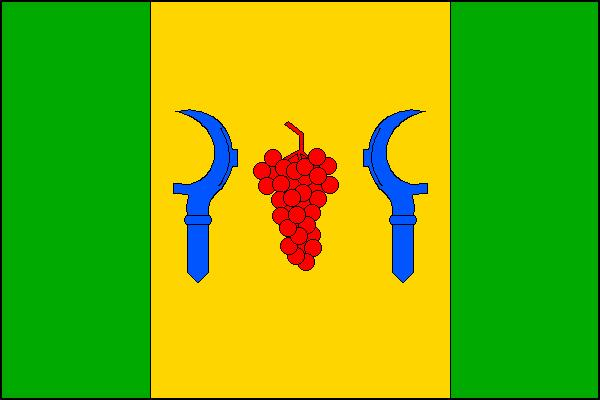
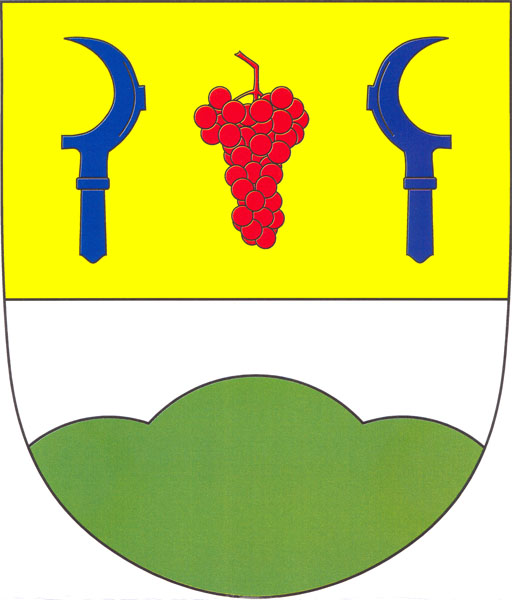
- Flag Coat of arms

- Location in the Czech Republic
- Coordinates: 49°3′16″N 17°4′50″E
- Country: Czech Republic
- Region: South Moravian
- District: Hodonín
- First mentioned: 1261

Area
  - Total: 4.25 km^{2} (1.64 sq mi)
- Elevation: 274 m (899 ft)

Population (2026-01-01)
  - Total: 347
  - Density: 81.6/km^{2} (211/sq mi)
- Time zone: UTC+1 (CET)
  - Summer (DST): UTC+2 (CEST)
- Postal code: 696 31
- Website: www.nechvalin.cz

Nechvalín is a municipality and village in Hodonín District in the South Moravian Region of the Czech Republic. It has about 300 inhabitants.

Nechvalín lies approximately 23 kilometres (14 mi) north of Hodonín, 38 km (24 mi) south-east of Brno, and 224 km (139 mi) south-east of Prague.

== Demographics ==
Historical population
Year	Pop.	±%
1869	482	—
1880	490	+1.7%
1890	518	+5.7%
1900	543	+4.8%
1910	551	+1.5%
1921	536	−2.7%
1930	606	+13.1%
1950	526	−13.2%
1961	476	−9.5%
1970	432	−9.2%
1980	373	−13.7%
1991	313	−16.1%
2001	324	+3.5%
2011	342	+5.6%
2021	323	−5.6%
Source: Censuses
