= Hostim =

- Municipality
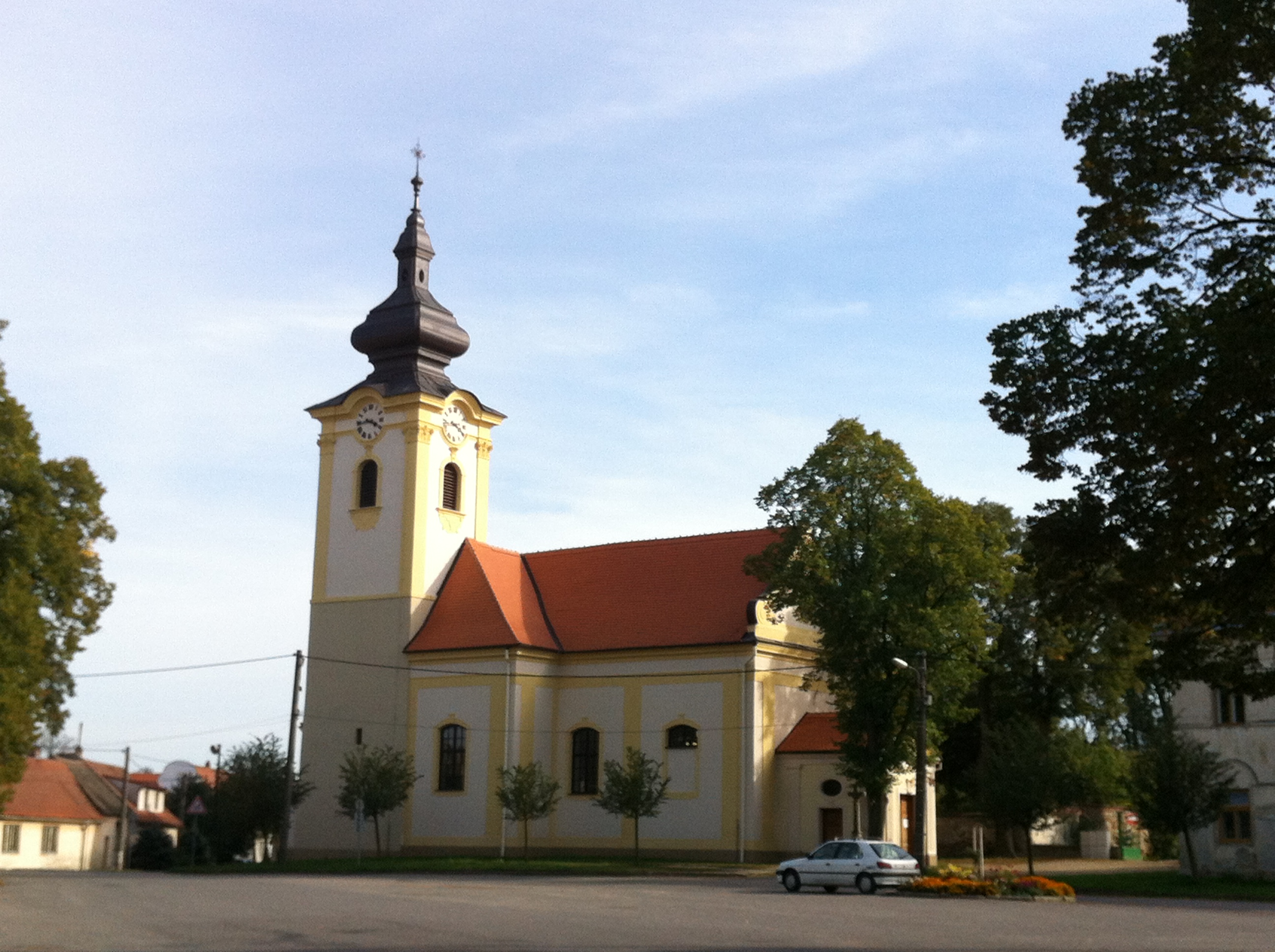
- Church of Saint Francis of Assisi

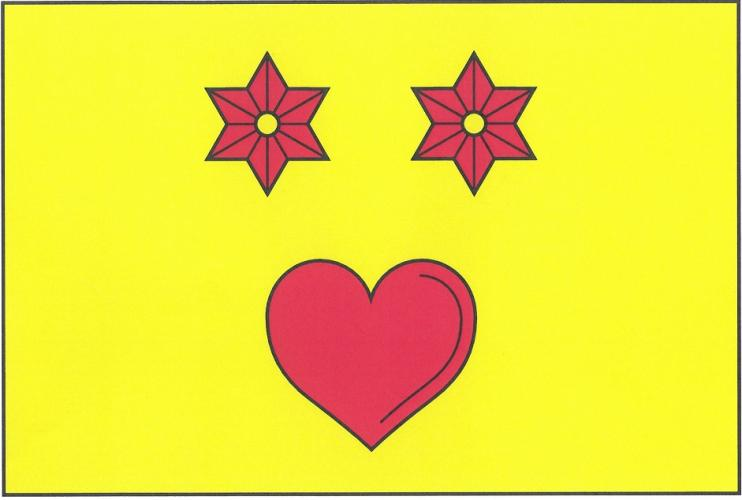
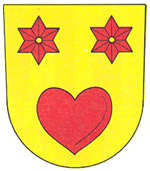
- Flag Coat of arms

- Location in the Czech Republic
- Coordinates: 49°1′7″N 15°53′42″E
- Country: Czech Republic
- Region: South Moravian
- District: Znojmo
- First mentioned: 1252

Area
  - Total: 19.00 km^{2} (7.34 sq mi)
- Elevation: 387 m (1,270 ft)

Population (2026-01-01)
  - Total: 384
  - Density: 20.2/km^{2} (52.3/sq mi)
- Time zone: UTC+1 (CET)
  - Summer (DST): UTC+2 (CEST)
- Postal code: 671 54
- Website: www.obechostim.cz

Hostim is a municipality and village in Znojmo District in the South Moravian Region of the Czech Republic. It has about 400 inhabitants.

Hostim lies approximately 21 kilometres (13 mi) north-west of Znojmo, 57 km (35 mi) west of Brno, and 160 km (99 mi) south-east of Prague.

== Demographics ==
Historical population
Year	Pop.	±%
1869	717	—
1880	766	+6.8%
1890	758	−1.0%
1900	759	+0.1%
1910	733	−3.4%
1921	731	−0.3%
1930	670	−8.3%
1950	547	−18.4%
1961	663	+21.2%
1970	578	−12.8%
1980	545	−5.7%
1991	476	−12.7%
2001	469	−1.5%
2011	438	−6.6%
2021	436	−0.5%
Source: Censuses
