= Pustiměř =

- Municipality
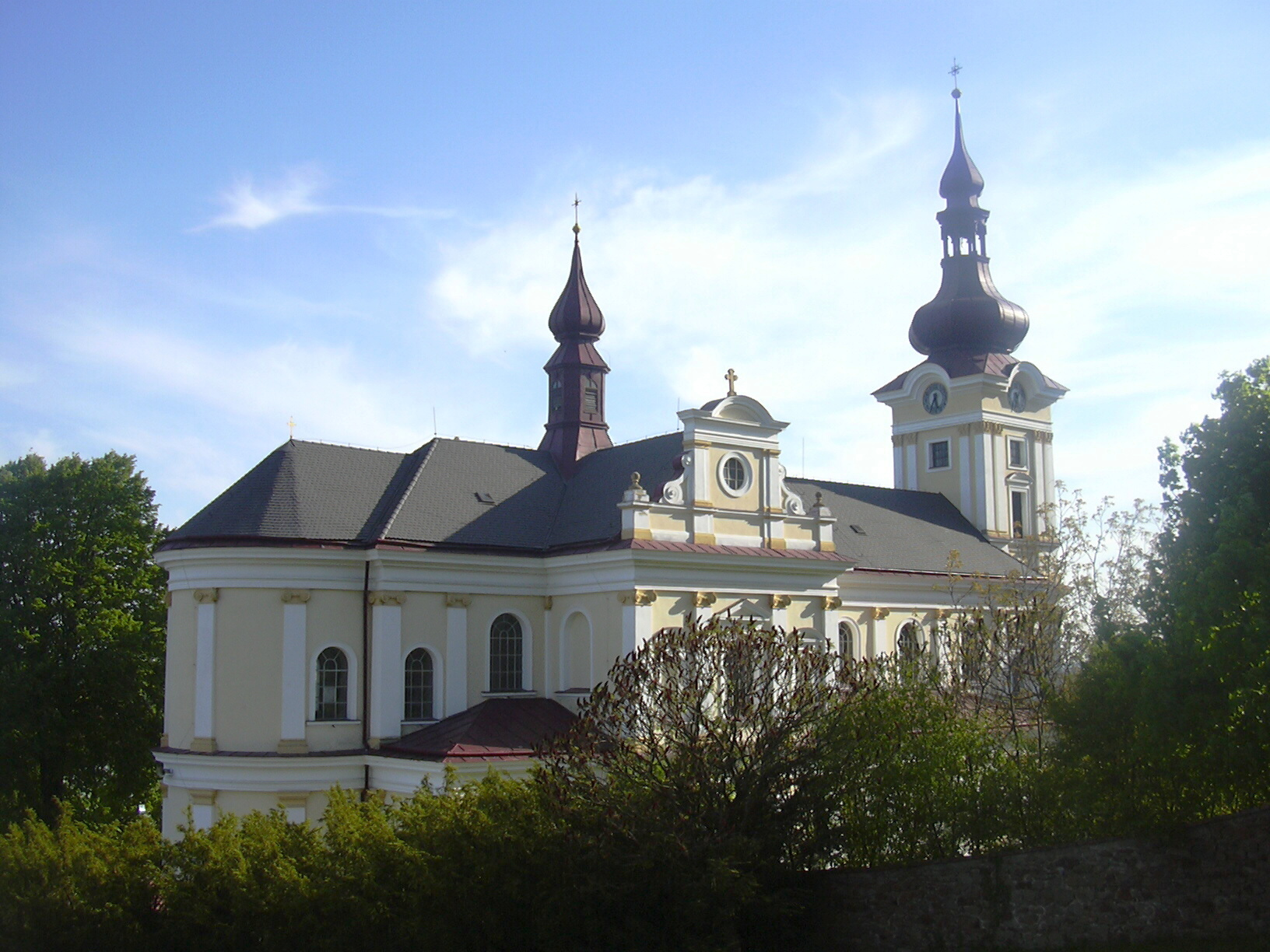
- Church of Saint Benedict

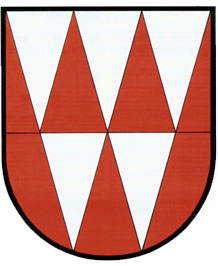
- Flag Coat of arms

- Location in the Czech Republic
- Coordinates: 49°19′21″N 17°1′41″E
- Country: Czech Republic
- Region: South Moravian
- District: Vyškov
- First mentioned: 1046

Area
  - Total: 12.50 km^{2} (4.83 sq mi)
- Elevation: 288 m (945 ft)

Population (2026-01-01)
  - Total: 1,929
  - Density: 154.3/km^{2} (399.7/sq mi)
- Time zone: UTC+1 (CET)
  - Summer (DST): UTC+2 (CEST)
- Postal code: 683 21
- Website: www.pustimer.eu

Pustiměř is a municipality and village in Vyškov District in the South Moravian Region of the Czech Republic. It has about 1,900 inhabitants.

== Administrative division ==
Pustiměř consists of two municipal parts (in brackets population according to the 2021 census):

- Pustiměř (771)
- Pustiměřské Prusy (1,049)

== Etymology ==
The name is derived from the personal name Pustimir or from similar old Slavic name.

== Geography ==
Pustiměř is located about 5 kilometres (3 mi) northeast of Vyškov and 30 km (19 mi) northeast of Brno. It lies mostly in the Vyškov Gate, only the northwestern part of the municipal territory extends into the Drahany Highlands. The stream Pustiměřský potok flows through the municipality.

== History ==
The first written mention of Pustiměř is in a deed of Stará Boleslav chapter from 1046. In the 1141 deed of Bishop Jindřich Zdík, Pustiměř was listed as a property of the Olomouc bishopric. After a monastery was founded in Pustiměř in 1340, the settlement became a market town and further developed. The monastery was demolished during the Hussite Wars, but it was officially abolished only in 1588. The development of Pustiměř was ended by the Thirty Years' War.

== Demographics ==
Historical population

Year	Pop.	±%
1869	1,487	—
1880	1,628	+9.5%
1890	1,608	−1.2%
1900	1,625	+1.1%
1910	1,804	+11.0%

Year	Pop.	±%
1921	1,918	+6.3%
1930	1,782	−7.1%
1950	1,534	−13.9%
1961	1,602	+4.4%
1970	1,448	−9.6%

Year	Pop.	±%
1980	1,460	+0.8%
1991	1,408	−3.6%
2001	1,528	+8.5%
2011	1,636	+7.1%
2021	1,820	+11.2%

Source: Censuses

== Transport ==
The D46 motorway (part of the European route E462) from Olomouc to Vyškov runs through the municipal territory.

== Sights ==
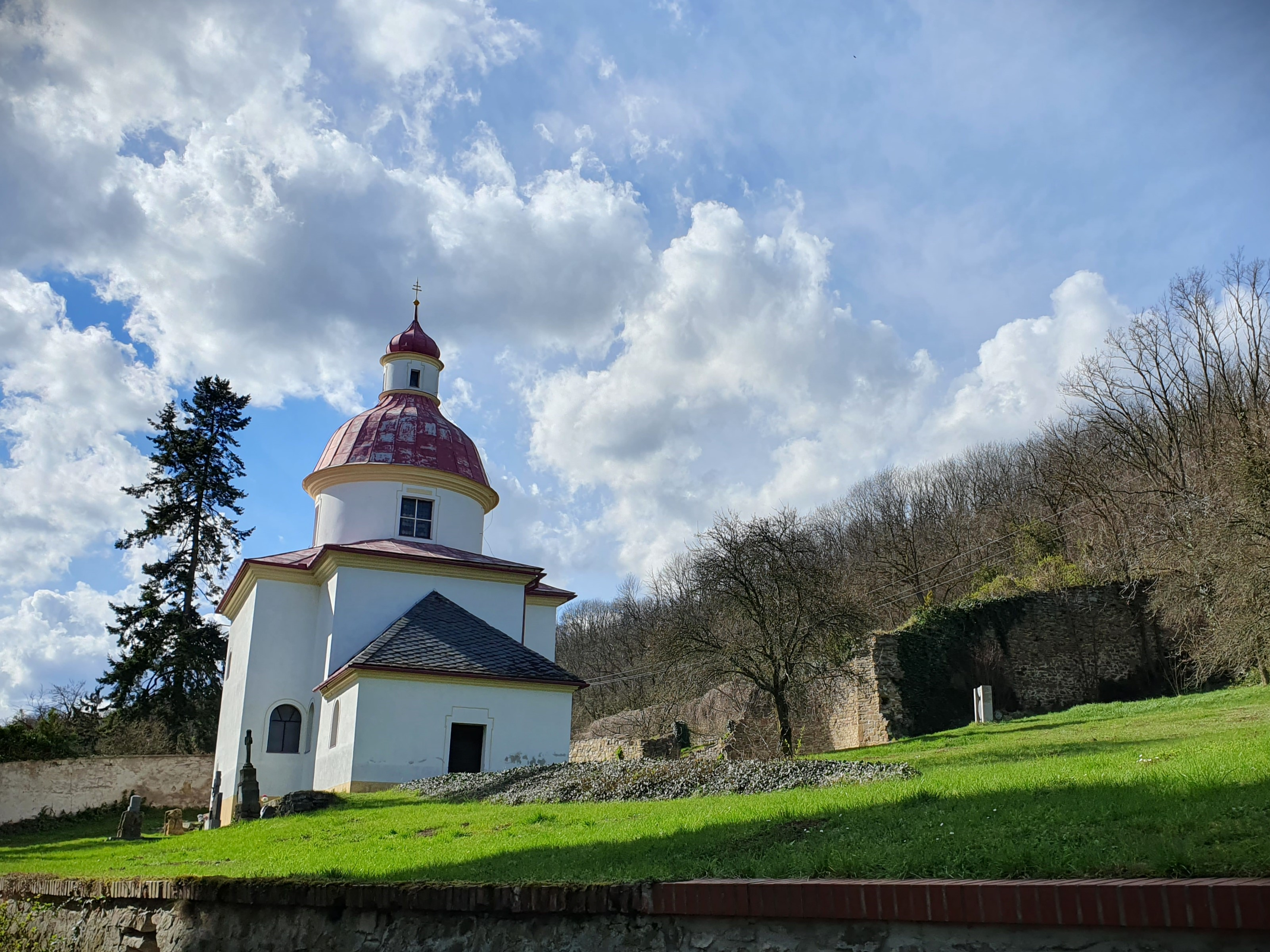
Chapel of Saint Anne

The main landmark of Pustiměř is the Church of Saint Benedict. It was built in 1901 on the site of a medieval church that had to be demolished.

Near the church is the Chapel of Saint Anne. Originally a Gothic chapel from the 14th century, it was rebuilt after the 1635 fire. Since 1687, it has been a pilgrimage site.

Next to the chapel is a ruin of the Rotunda of Saint Pantaleon. It was a Romanesque building, built probably in the second half of the 11th century. It is significant historical evidence of the original centre of Slavic liturgy.

== Notable people ==
- Karel Knesl (1942–2020), footballer
