= Němčice =

Němčice or Nemčice may refer to places:

== Czech Republic ==
- Němčice (Blansko District), a municipality and village in the South Moravian Region
- Němčice (Domažlice District), a municipality and village in the Plzeň Region
- Němčice (Kolín District), a municipality and village in the Central Bohemian Region
- Němčice (Kroměříž District), a municipality and village in the Zlín Region
- Němčice (Mladá Boleslav District), a municipality and village in the Central Bohemian Region
- Němčice (Pardubice District), a municipality and village in the Pardubice Region
- Němčice (Prachatice District), a municipality and village in the South Bohemian Region
- Němčice (Strakonice District), a municipality and village in the South Bohemian Region
- Němčice (Svitavy District), a municipality and village in the Pardubice Region
- Němčice, a village and part of Ivančice in the South Moravian Region
- Němčice, a village and part of Meclov in the Plzeň Region
- Němčice, a village and part of Loket (Benešov District) in the Central Bohemian Region
- Němčice, a village and part of Předslav in the Plzeň Region
- Němčice, a village and part of Sedlice (Strakonice District) in the South Bohemian Region
- Horní Němčice, a municipality and village in the South Bohemian Region
- Němčice nad Hanou, a town in the Olomouc Region
- Velké Němčice, a market town in the South Moravian Region

== Slovakia ==
- Nemčice, a municipality and village in the Nitra Region

== See also ==
- Němčičky (disambiguation)
