= Zhoř =

Zhoř may refer to places in the Czech Republic:

- Zhoř (Brno-Country District), a municipality and village in the South Moravian Region
- Zhoř (Jihlava District), a municipality and village in the Vysočina Region
- Zhoř (Písek District), a municipality and village in the South Bohemian Region
- Zhoř (Tachov District), a municipality and village in the Plzeň Region
- Zhoř u Mladé Vožice, a municipality and village in the South Bohemian Region
- Zhoř u Tábora, a municipality and village in the South Bohemian Region
- Zhoř, a village and part of Čechtice in the Central Bohemian Region
- Zhoř, a village and part of Červené Janovice in the Central Bohemian Region
- Zhoř, a village and part of Krakovec in the Central Bohemian Region
- Zhoř, a village and part of Krásná Hora nad Vltavou in the Central Bohemian Region
- Zhoř (Němčice), a village and part of Němčice in the Pardubice Region
- Zhoř, a village and part of Pacov in the Vysočina Region
- Zhoř, a village and part of Skuteč in the Pardubice Region
- Zhoř, a village and part of Vilémov (Havlíčkův Brod District) in the Vysočina Region
- Stránecká Zhoř, a municipality and village in the Vysočina Region
- Zálesná Zhoř, a municipality and village in the South Moravian Region
