= Jeníkovice =

Jeníkovice may refer to places in the Czech Republic:

- Jeníkovice (Hradec Králové District), a municipality and village in the Hradec Králové Region
- Jeníkovice (Pardubice District), a municipality and village in the Pardubice Region
- Jeníkovice, a village and part of Meclov in the Plzeň Region
