= Bozdíš =

Coordinates: 49°28′45″N 12°54′18″E

- Village
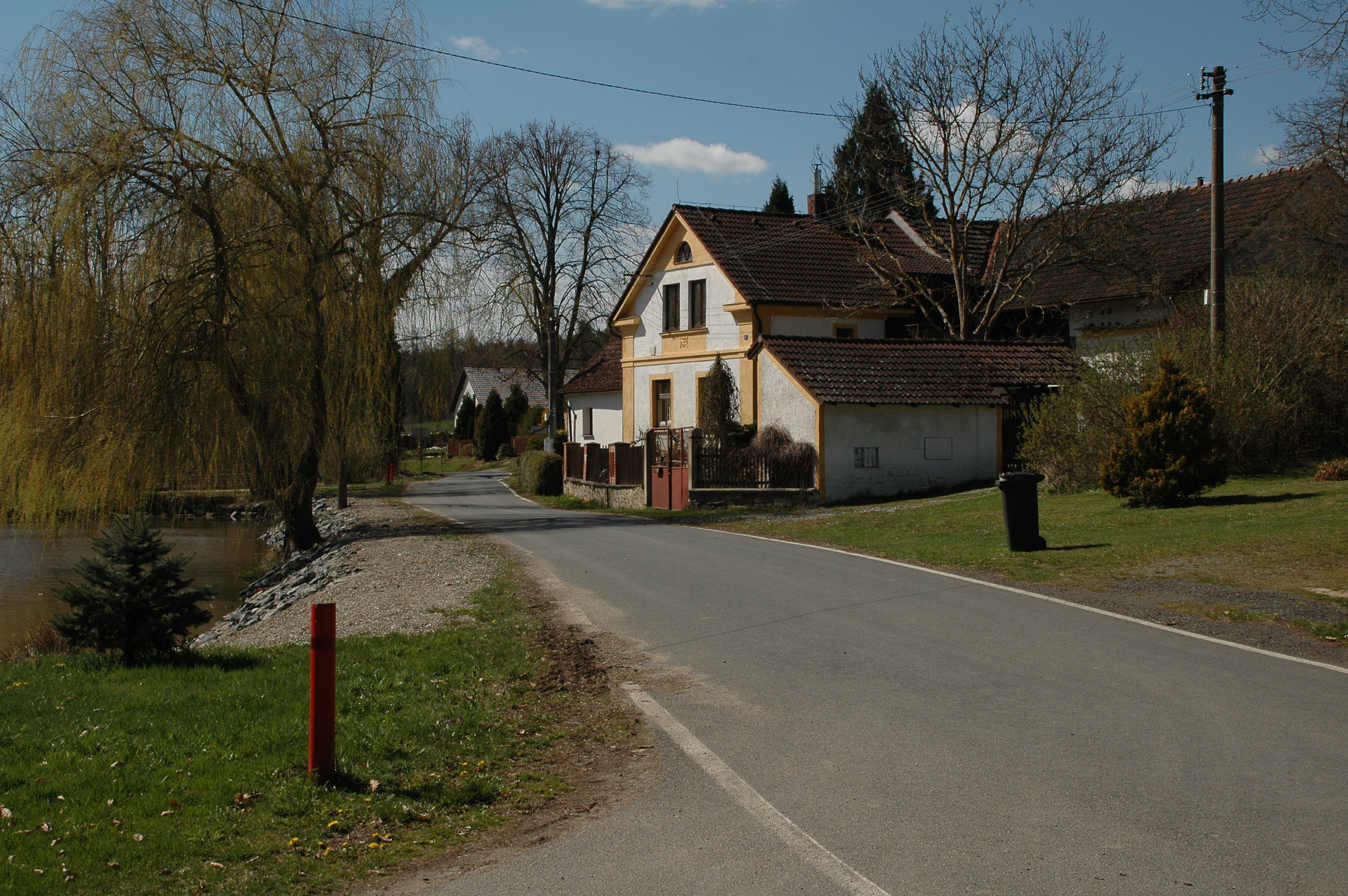

- Location within Czech Republic
- Country: Czech Republic
- Region: Plzeň
- District: Domažlice
- First mentioned: 1420

Area
  - Total: 1.97 km^{2} (0.76 sq mi)

Population (2011)
  - Total: 9
  - Density: 4.6/km^{2} (12/sq mi)
- Time zone: UTC+1 (CET)
  - Summer (DST): UTC+2 (CEST)
- Postal code: 345 21

Bozdíš (German: Wostirschen) is a small village in the municipality of Meclov in the District of Domažlice, in the Plzeň Region of the Czech Republic. It is located approximately 4 km southeast of Meclov. There are 14 addresses registered in the village. In 2011, nine people permanently lived here.

Bozdíš is also the name of the cadastral area with an area of 1.97 km^{2}.

== History ==
The first written mention of the village comes from the year 1420. The name of the village underwent remarkable development from Boiches, through Rozděš, Bozděš, Wastissen, Wozdiršen to the officially created name (in 1854) Ostříží. This was the official name of the village until 1923.
