= Nemčić (surname) =

Nemčić is a surname. The Croatian census of 2011 listed it as one of the most common surnames in Bedenica, Dubravica, Zagreb County and Gornja Rijeka, Croatia.

Notable people with the surname include:

- Antun Nemčić, a Croatian writer
- Tihana Nemčić, a Croatian football manager and former footballer

== See also ==
- Němčice
