= Mašovice (Meclov) =

- Village
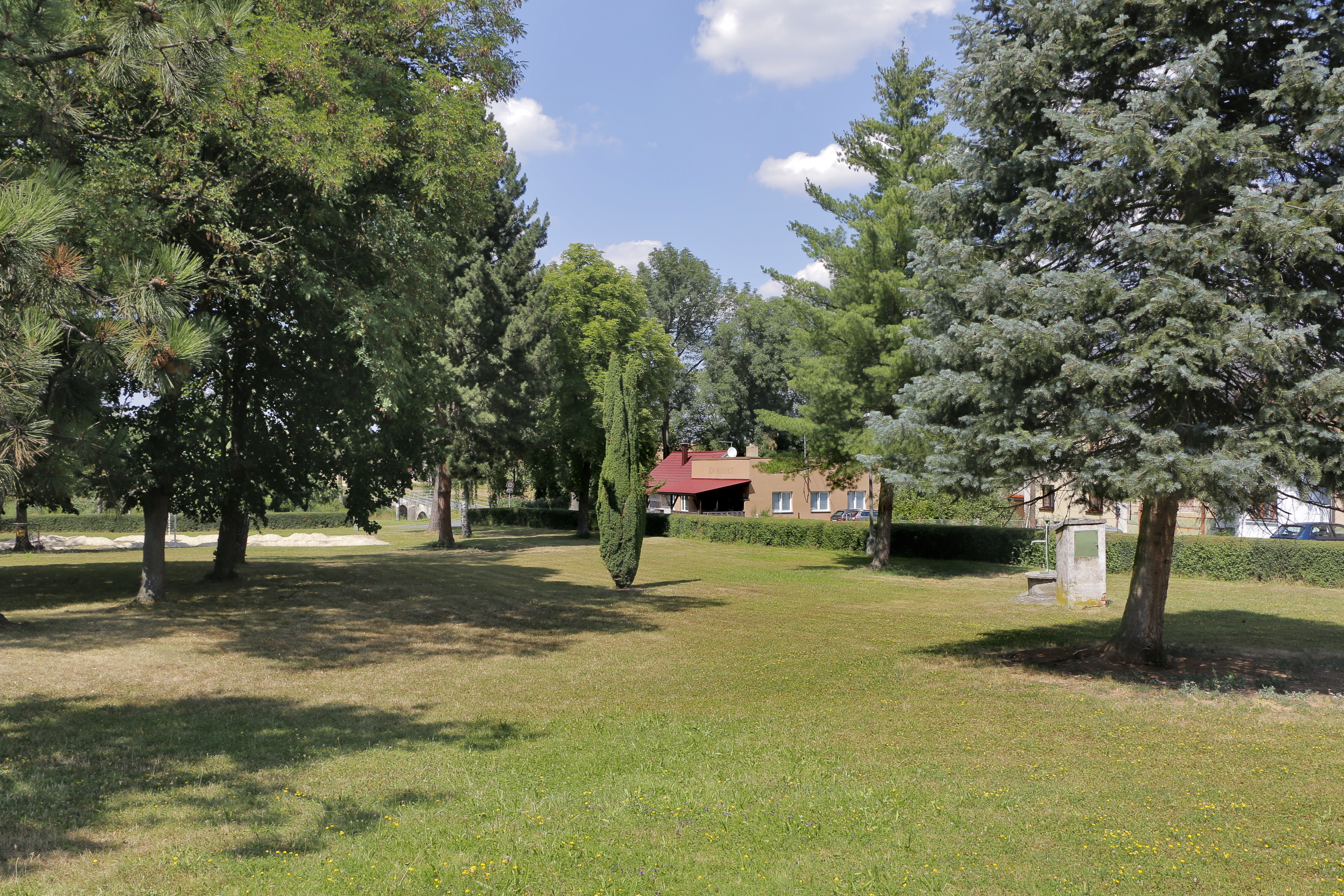
- Centre of Meclov, Mašovice, common II.jpg

- Location in the Czech Republic
- Coordinates: 49°30′54″N 12°53′54″E
- Country: Czech Republic
- Region: Plzeň
- District: Domažlice
- Municipality: Meclov
- First mentioned: 1115

Area
  - Total: 4.95 km^{2} (1.91 sq mi)
- Elevation: 385 m (1,263 ft)

Population (2021)
  - Total: 71
  - Density: 14/km^{2} (37/sq mi)
- Time zone: UTC+1 (CET)
  - Summer (DST): UTC+2 (CEST)
- Postal code: 346 01

Mašovice is a village and municipal part of the municipality of Meclov in Domažlice District in the Plzeň Region of the Czech Republic. It has about 70 inhabitants.

== Geography ==
Mašovice is located about 1.5 km (1 mi) northeast of the Meclov village and 8 km (5 mi) north of Domažlice. The stream Černý potok flows through the village.

== History ==
The first written mention of Mašovice is from 1115, when the village belonged to monastery in Kladruby. For most of its history, Mašovice was a part of the Horšovský Týn estate. In 19th century, there was a watermill located on the western part of the village. In 1848–1960, Mašovice was an independent municipality. Since 1961, it has been an administrative part of Meclov.

== Transport ==
The I/26 road (the section from Plzeň to Domažlice) runs through the territory of the village.

Mašovice is located on the railway line Poběžovice–Staňkov.

== Sights ==
There are no protected cultural monuments in the municipality.
