= Němčičky =

Němčičky may refer to:

== Places in the Czech Republic ==
- Němčičky (Břeclav District)
- Němčičky (Brno-Country District)
- Němčičky (Znojmo District)

== People ==
- Tomáš Němčický, Slovak ice hockey player
- Pavel Němčický, Czech football player
