= Němčice (Kolín District) =

- Municipality
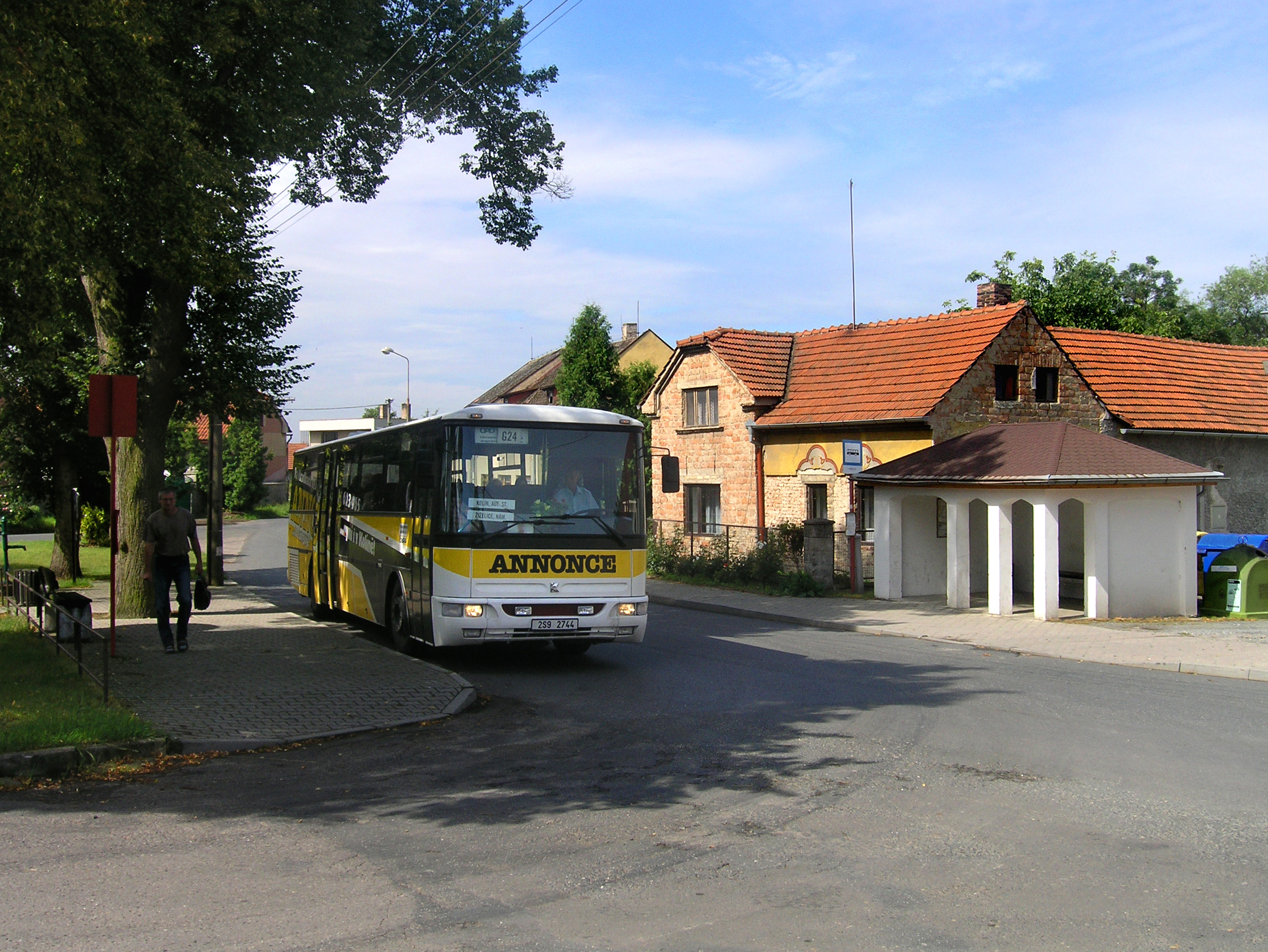
- Common in Němčice

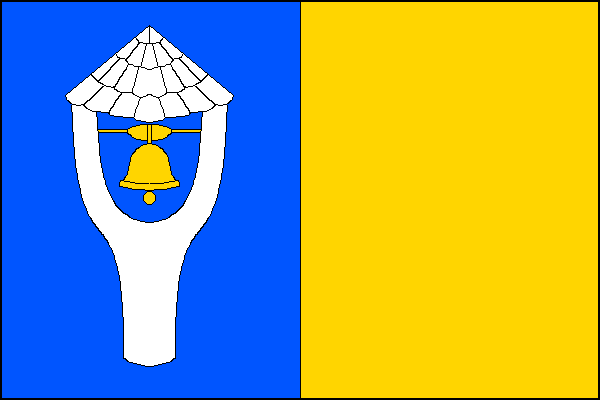
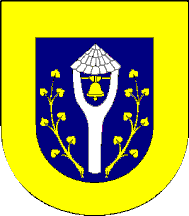
- Flag Coat of arms

- Location in the Czech Republic
- Coordinates: 50°5′4″N 15°17′39″E
- Country: Czech Republic
- Region: Central Bohemian
- District: Kolín
- First mentioned: 1397

Area
  - Total: 7.17 km^{2} (2.77 sq mi)
- Elevation: 230 m (750 ft)

Population (2026-01-01)
  - Total: 406
  - Density: 56.6/km^{2} (147/sq mi)
- Time zone: UTC+1 (CET)
  - Summer (DST): UTC+2 (CEST)
- Postal code: 280 02
- Website: www.ou-nemcice.cz

Němčice is a municipality and village in Kolín District in the Central Bohemian Region of the Czech Republic. It has about 400 inhabitants.

== Etymology ==
The name is derived from the personal name Němec, meaning "the village of Němec's people".

== Geography ==
Němčice is located about 9 kilometres (6 mi) northeast of Kolín and 54 km (34 mi) east of Prague. It lies on the border between the Central Elbe Table and East Elbe Table. The highest point is at 262 m (860 ft) above sea level.

== History ==
The first written mention of Němčice is from 1397. Until the end of the 16th century, the village was owned by various lower noblemen, but the it was bought by Emperor Rudolf II and annexed to the Kolín estate. Němčice belonged to the royal chamber until 1829, when the village was sold to Jakub Veith. He owned Němčice until the establishment of independent municipalities in 1848. Němčice was a municipal part of Ohaře from 1848 to 1860, but then it became a separate municipality.

== Demographics ==
Historical population

Year	Pop.	±%
1869	423	—
1880	495	+17.0%
1890	518	+4.6%
1900	482	−6.9%
1910	506	+5.0%

Year	Pop.	±%
1921	493	−2.6%
1930	460	−6.7%
1950	390	−15.2%
1961	401	+2.8%
1970	370	−7.7%

Year	Pop.	±%
1980	326	−11.9%
1991	304	−6.7%
2001	277	−8.9%
2011	316	+14.1%
2021	371	+17.4%

Source: Censuses

== Transport ==
There are no railways or major roads passing through the municipality.

== Sights ==
There are no protected cultural monuments in the municipality.
