= Němčice (Kroměříž District) =

- Municipality
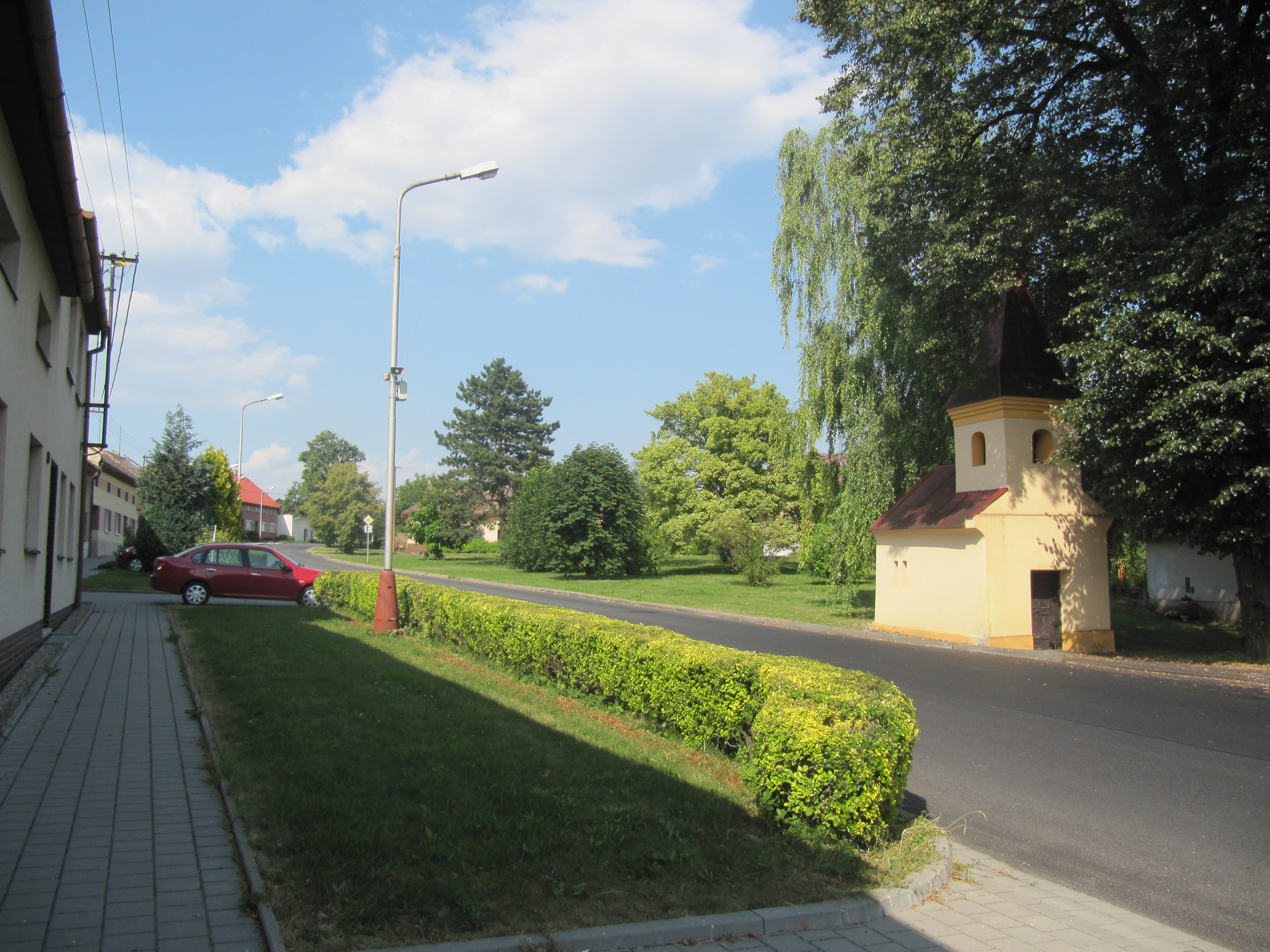
- Centre of Němčice with a chapel

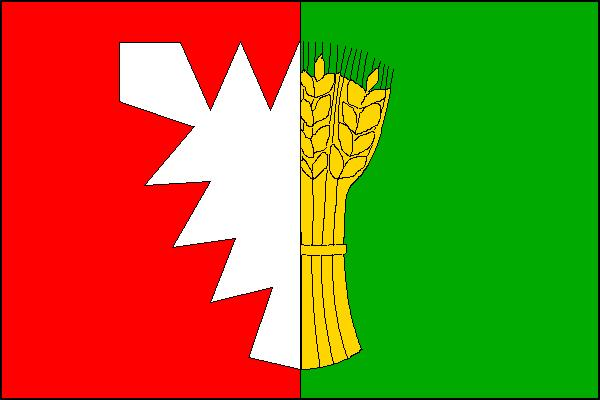
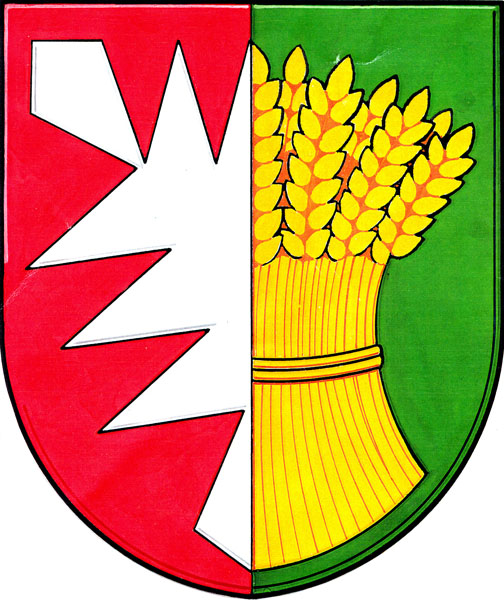
- Flag Coat of arms

- Location in the Czech Republic
- Coordinates: 49°21′53″N 17°29′52″E
- Country: Czech Republic
- Region: Zlín
- District: Kroměříž
- First mentioned: 1261

Area
  - Total: 2.91 km^{2} (1.12 sq mi)
- Elevation: 228 m (748 ft)

Population (2026-01-01)
  - Total: 385
  - Density: 132/km^{2} (343/sq mi)
- Time zone: UTC+1 (CET)
  - Summer (DST): UTC+2 (CEST)
- Postal code: 768 43
- Website: www.obec-nemcice.cz

Němčice is a municipality and village in Kroměříž District in the Zlín Region of the Czech Republic. It has about 400 inhabitants.

Němčice lies approximately 10 kilometres (6 mi) north-east of Kroměříž, 20 km (12 mi) north-west of Zlín, and 236 km (147 mi) east of Prague.

== Demographics ==
Historical population
Year	Pop.	±%
1869	359	—
1880	443	+23.4%
1890	439	−0.9%
1900	422	−3.9%
1910	493	+16.8%
1921	494	+0.2%
1930	544	+10.1%
1950	406	−25.4%
1961	442	+8.9%
1970	425	−3.8%
1980	407	−4.2%
1991	363	−10.8%
2001	366	+0.8%
2011	366	+0.0%
2021	335	−8.5%
Source: Censuses
