= Horní Němčice =

- Municipality
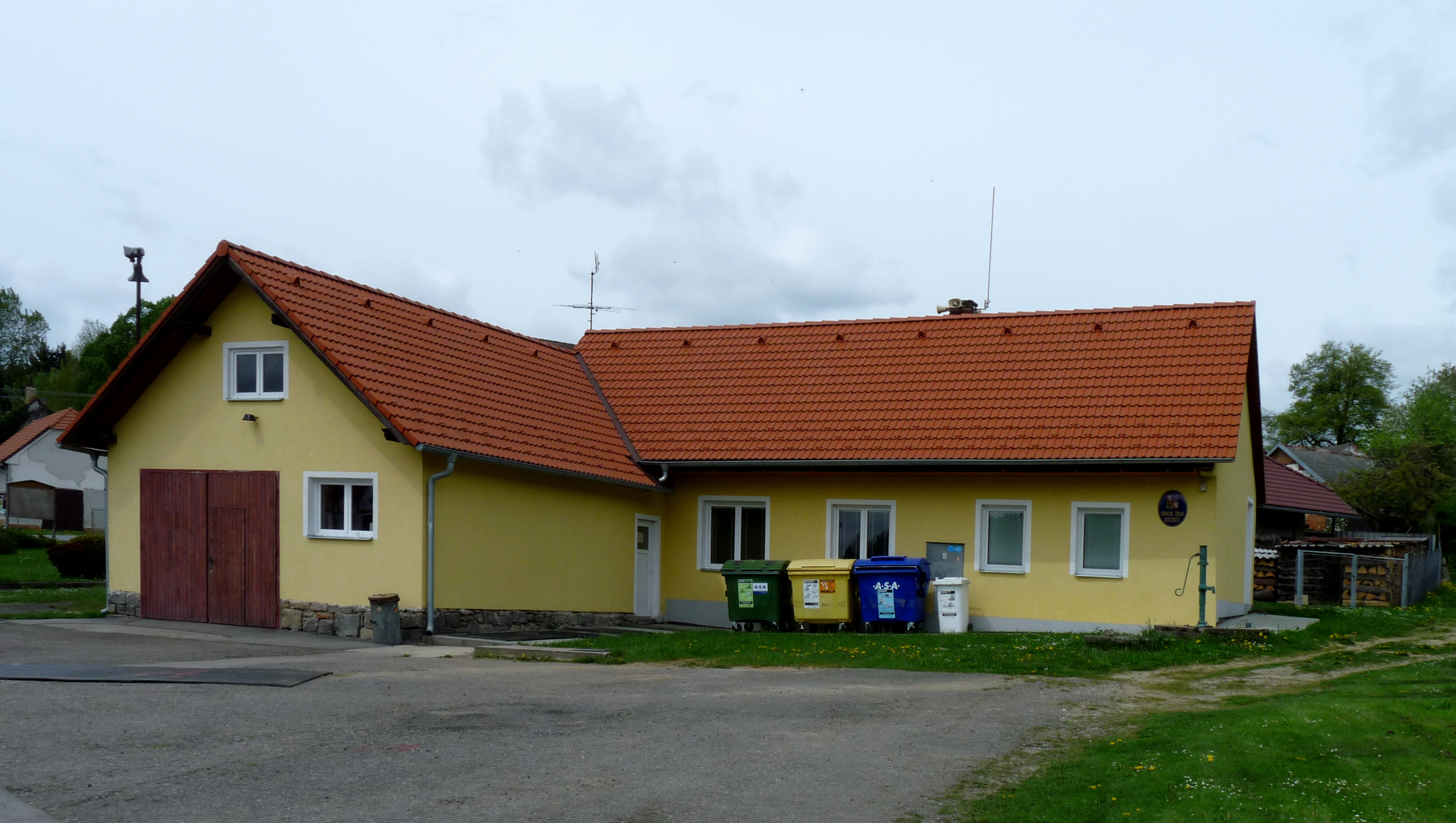
- Municipal office

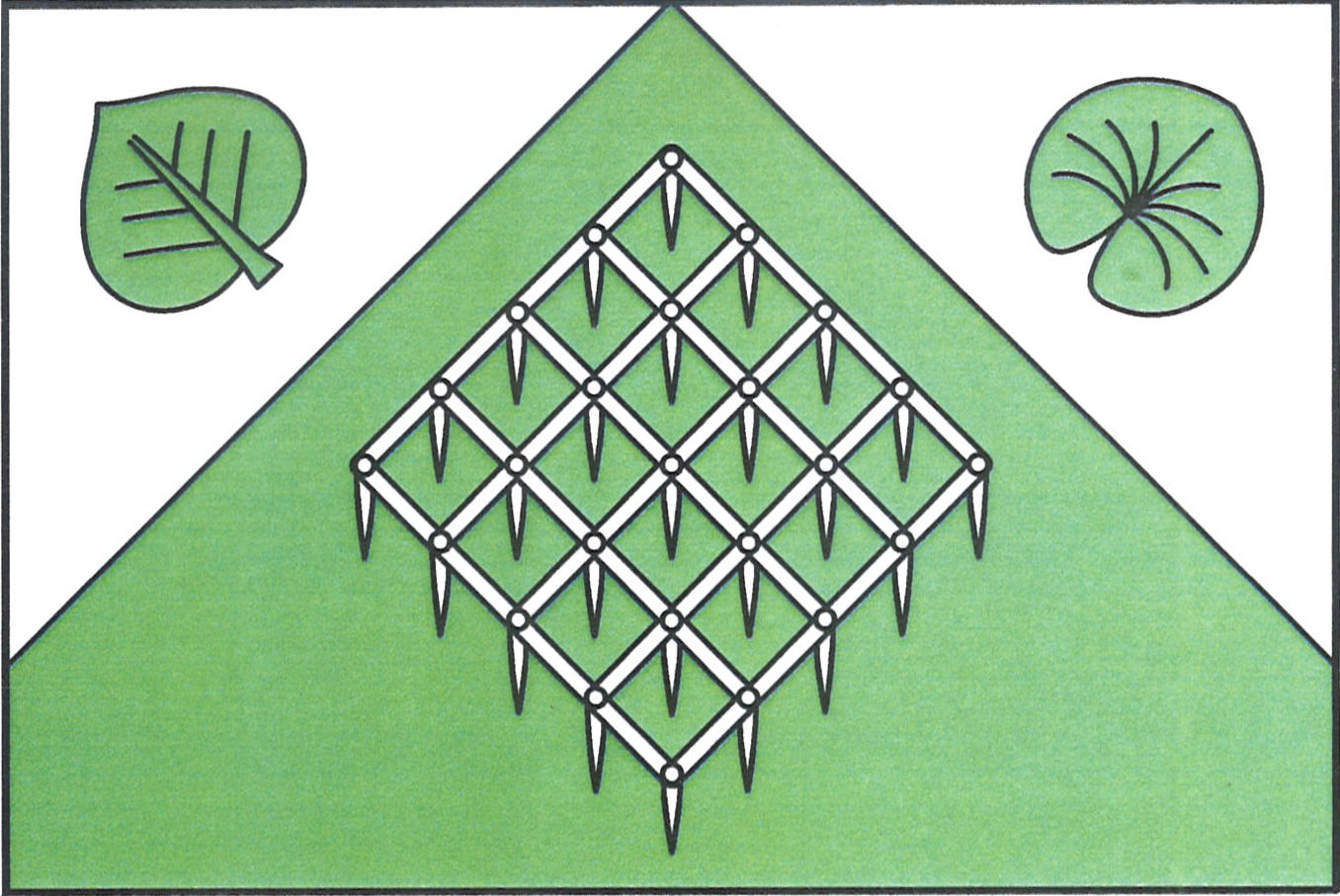
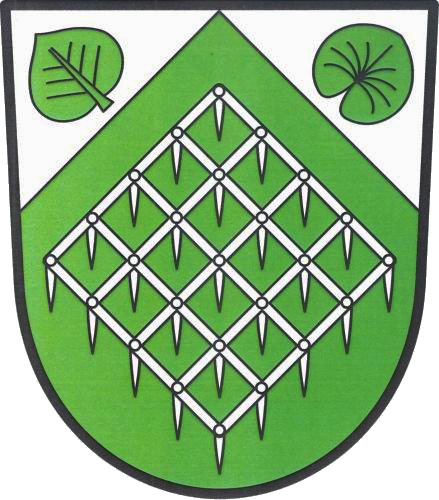
- Flag Coat of arms

- Location in the Czech Republic
- Coordinates: 49°9′28″N 15°16′47″E
- Country: Czech Republic
- Region: South Bohemian
- District: Jindřichův Hradec
- First mentioned: 1368

Area
  - Total: 4.17 km^{2} (1.61 sq mi)
- Elevation: 593 m (1,946 ft)

Population (2026-01-01)
  - Total: 95
  - Density: 23/km^{2} (59/sq mi)
- Time zone: UTC+1 (CET)
  - Summer (DST): UTC+2 (CEST)
- Postal code: 378 53
- Website: horninemcice.cz

Horní Němčice is a municipality and village in Jindřichův Hradec District in the South Bohemian Region of the Czech Republic. It has about 100 inhabitants.

Horní Němčice lies approximately 21 kilometres (13 mi) east of Jindřichův Hradec, 63 km (39 mi) east of České Budějovice, and 121 km (75 mi) south-east of Prague.

== Demographics ==
Historical population
Year	Pop.	±%
1869	250	—
1880	259	+3.6%
1890	291	+12.4%
1900	247	−15.1%
1910	289	+17.0%
1921	274	−5.2%
1930	234	−14.6%
1950	191	−18.4%
1961	168	−12.0%
1970	157	−6.5%
1980	107	−31.8%
1991	95	−11.2%
2001	94	−1.1%
2011	90	−4.3%
2021	74	−17.8%
Source: Censuses
