= Zálesná Zhoř =

- Municipality
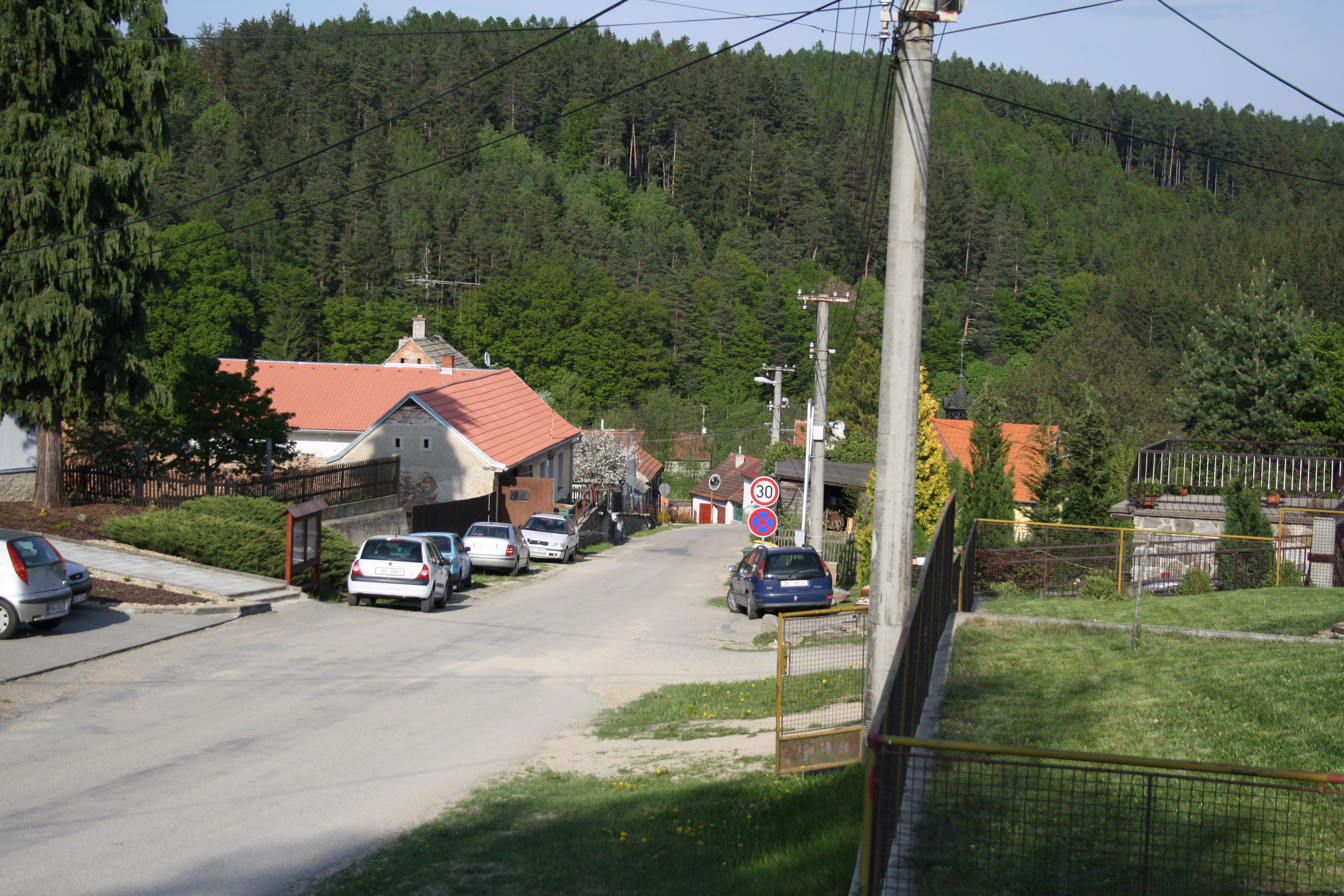
- Upper part of Zálesná Zhoř

- Location in the Czech Republic
- Coordinates: 49°25′32″N 16°23′39″E
- Country: Czech Republic
- Region: South Moravian
- District: Brno-Country
- First mentioned: 1358

Area
  - Total: 5.35 km^{2} (2.07 sq mi)
- Elevation: 443 m (1,453 ft)

Population (2026-01-01)
  - Total: 66
  - Density: 12/km^{2} (32/sq mi)
- Time zone: UTC+1 (CET)
  - Summer (DST): UTC+2 (CEST)
- Postal code: 664 84
- Website: www.zalesnazhor.cz

Zálesná Zhoř is a municipality and village in Brno-Country District in the South Moravian Region of the Czech Republic. It has about 70 inhabitants.

Zálesná Zhoř lies approximately 25 kilometres (16 mi) west of Brno and 164 km (102 mi) south-east of Prague.

== Demographics ==
Historical population
Year	Pop.	±%
1869	157	—
1880	174	+10.8%
1890	179	+2.9%
1900	150	−16.2%
1910	162	+8.0%
1921	188	+16.0%
1930	170	−9.6%
1950	153	−10.0%
1961	127	−17.0%
1970	122	−3.9%
1980	86	−29.5%
1991	63	−26.7%
2001	37	−41.3%
2011	76	+105.4%
2021	55	−27.6%
Source: Censuses
