= Němčice (Prachatice District) =

- Municipality
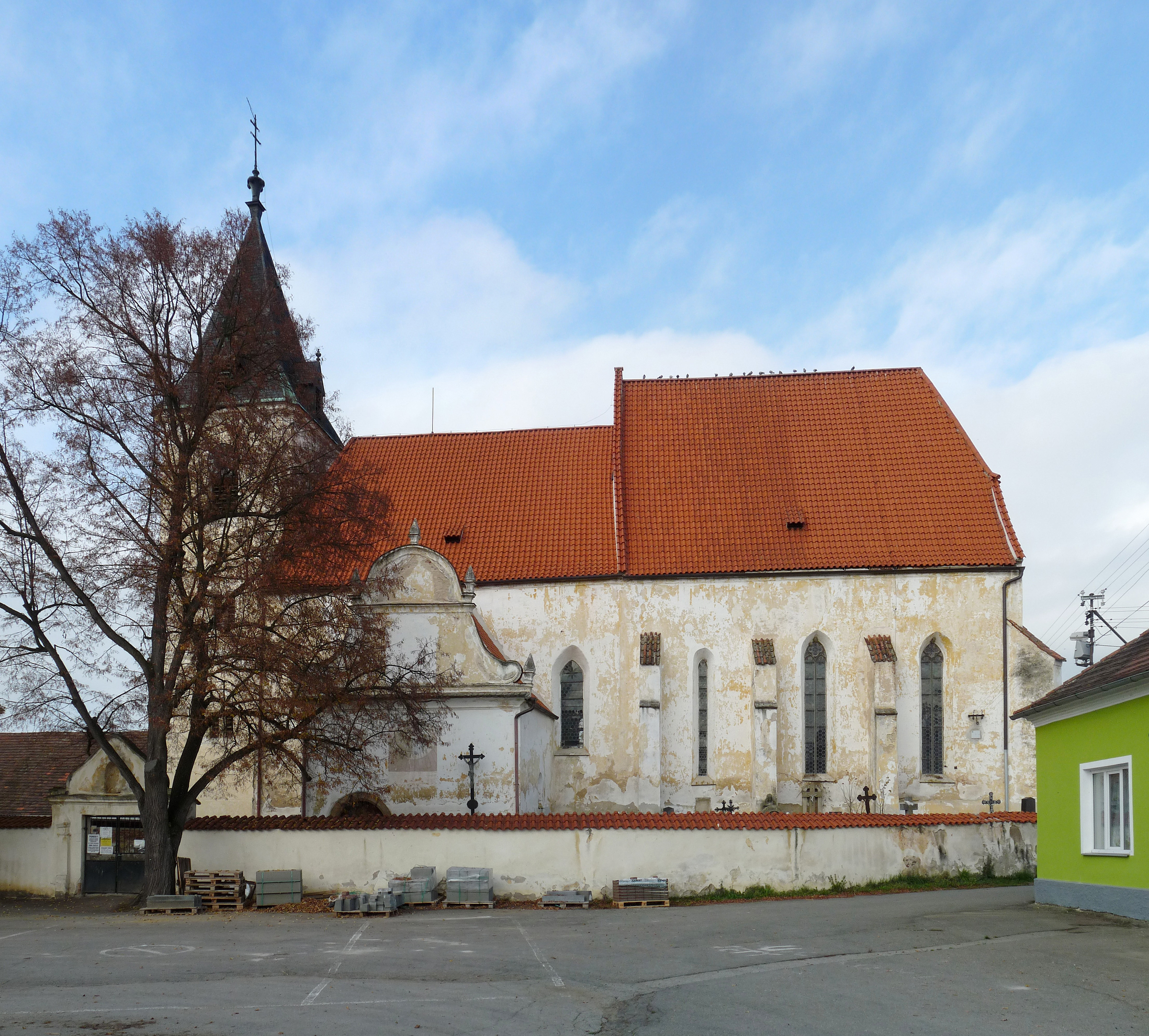
- Church of Saint Nicholas

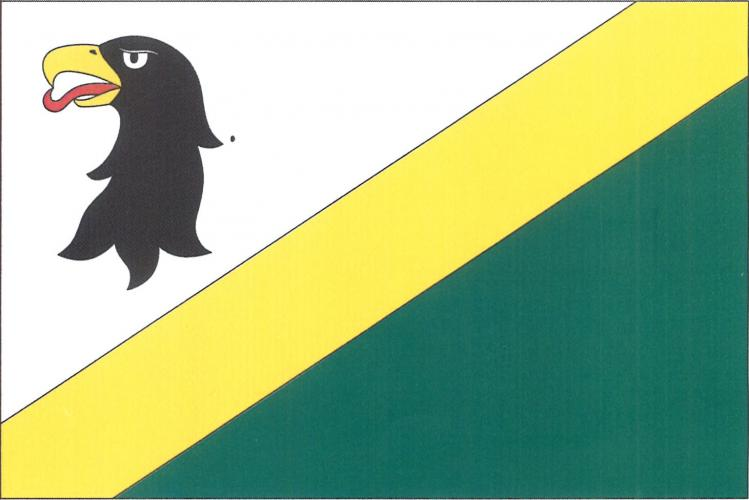
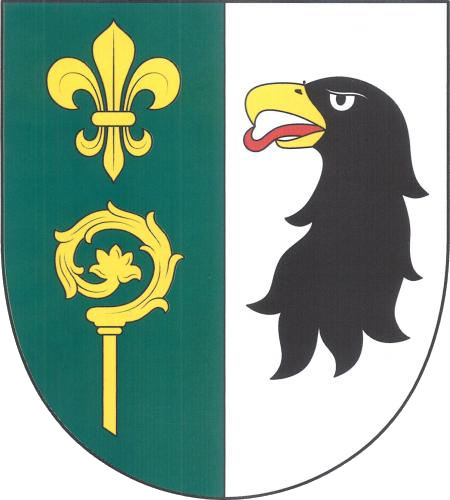
- Flag Coat of arms

- Location in the Czech Republic
- Coordinates: 49°1′55″N 14°16′17″E
- Country: Czech Republic
- Region: South Bohemian
- District: Prachatice
- First mentioned: 1220

Area
  - Total: 4.15 km^{2} (1.60 sq mi)
- Elevation: 431 m (1,414 ft)

Population (2026-01-01)
  - Total: 174
  - Density: 41.9/km^{2} (109/sq mi)
- Time zone: UTC+1 (CET)
  - Summer (DST): UTC+2 (CEST)
- Postal code: 384 11
- Website: www.nemcice-pt.cz

Němčice is a municipality and village in Prachatice District in the South Bohemian Region of the Czech Republic. It has about 200 inhabitants.

Němčice lies approximately 21 kilometres (13 mi) east of Prachatice, 17 km (11 mi) north-west of České Budějovice, and 118 km (73 mi) south of Prague.

== Administrative division ==
Němčice consists of two municipal parts (in brackets population according to the 2021 census):

- Němčice (177)
- Sedlovice (20)

== Demographics ==
Historical population
Year	Pop.	±%
1869	278	—
1880	322	+15.8%
1890	286	−11.2%
1900	280	−2.1%
1910	301	+7.5%
1921	287	−4.7%
1930	257	−10.5%
1950	207	−19.5%
1961	174	−15.9%
1970	163	−6.3%
1980	171	+4.9%
1991	181	+5.8%
2001	187	+3.3%
2011	196	+4.8%
2021	197	+0.5%
Source: Censuses
