= Zhoř (Brno-Country District) =

- Municipality
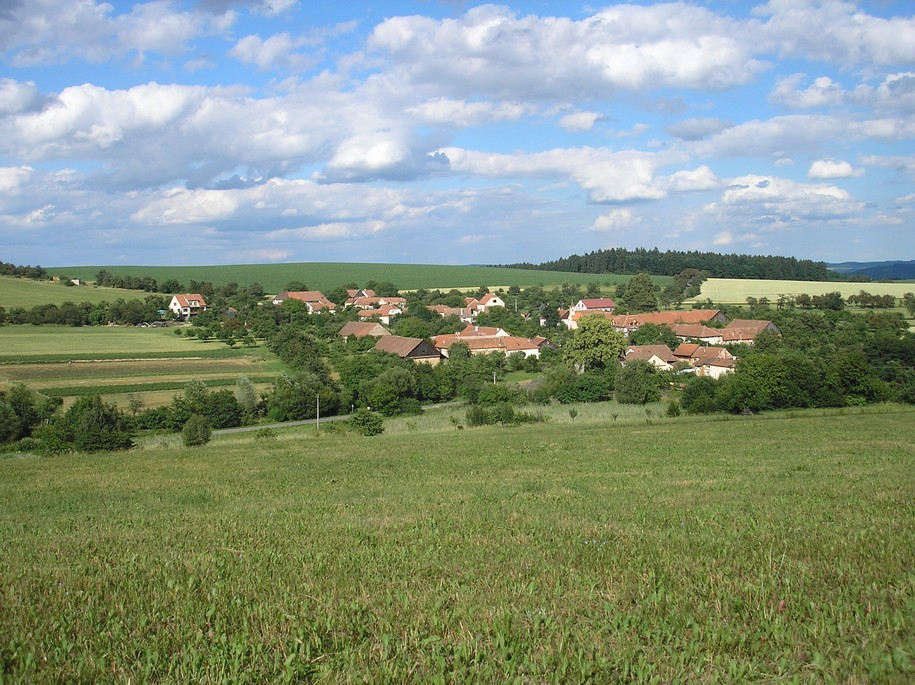
- General view

- Location in the Czech Republic
- Coordinates: 49°24′53″N 16°28′44″E
- Country: Czech Republic
- Region: South Moravian
- District: Brno-Country
- First mentioned: 1348

Area
  - Total: 2.09 km^{2} (0.81 sq mi)
- Elevation: 495 m (1,624 ft)

Population (2026-01-01)
  - Total: 78
  - Density: 37/km^{2} (97/sq mi)
- Time zone: UTC+1 (CET)
  - Summer (DST): UTC+2 (CEST)
- Postal code: 679 23
- Website: www.zhor-bv.cz

Zhoř is a municipality and village in Brno-Country District in the South Moravian Region of the Czech Republic. It has about 80 inhabitants.

Zhoř lies approximately 26 kilometres (16 mi) north-west of Brno and 166 km (103 mi) south-east of Prague.

== Demographics ==
Historical population
Year	Pop.	±%
1869	113	—
1880	114	+0.9%
1890	109	−4.4%
1900	110	+0.9%
1910	113	+2.7%
1921	104	−8.0%
1930	106	+1.9%
1950	103	−2.8%
1961	96	−6.8%
1970	87	−9.4%
1980	73	−16.1%
1991	55	−24.7%
2001	59	+7.3%
2011	63	+6.8%
2021	74	+17.5%
Source: Censuses
