= Zhoř (Němčice) =

- Village
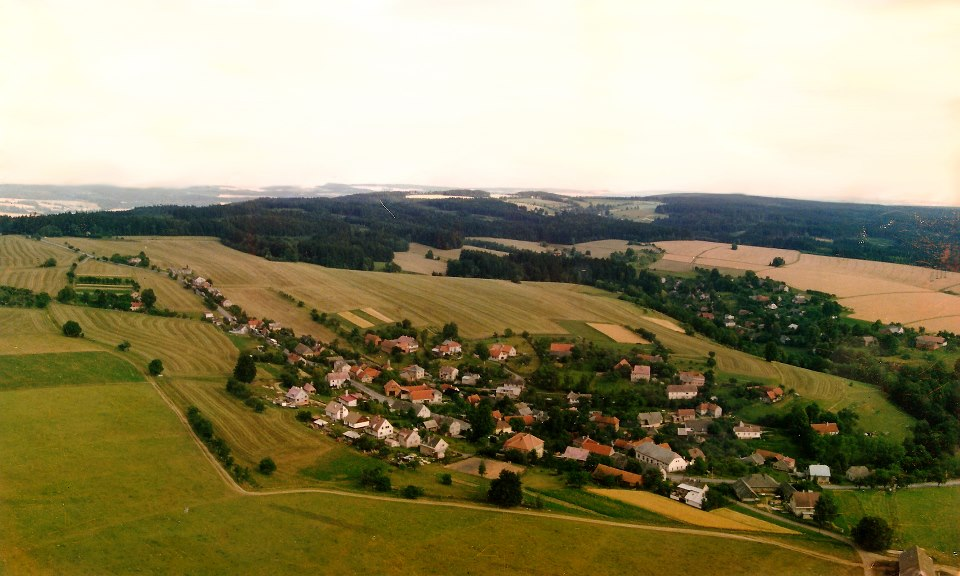
- Aerial view

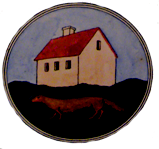
- Emblem of the village Zhoř

- Location in the Czech Republic
- Coordinates: 49°54′13″N 16°23′2″E
- Country: Czech Republic
- Region: Pardubice Region
- District: Svitavy District
- Municipality: Němčice

Area
  - Total: 2.85 km^{2} (1.10 sq mi)
- Elevation: 483 m (1,585 ft)

Population (2011)
  - Total: 257
- Website: zhor.maweb.eu

Zhoř is a village in the Němčice municipality in the Svitavy District (until 1 January 2007, in the Ústí nad Orlicí District) in the Pardubice Region of the Czech Republic. It is situated in the north of Svitavy District, near historical town Litomyšl. The population of the village was 257 inhabitants in 2011.

== History ==
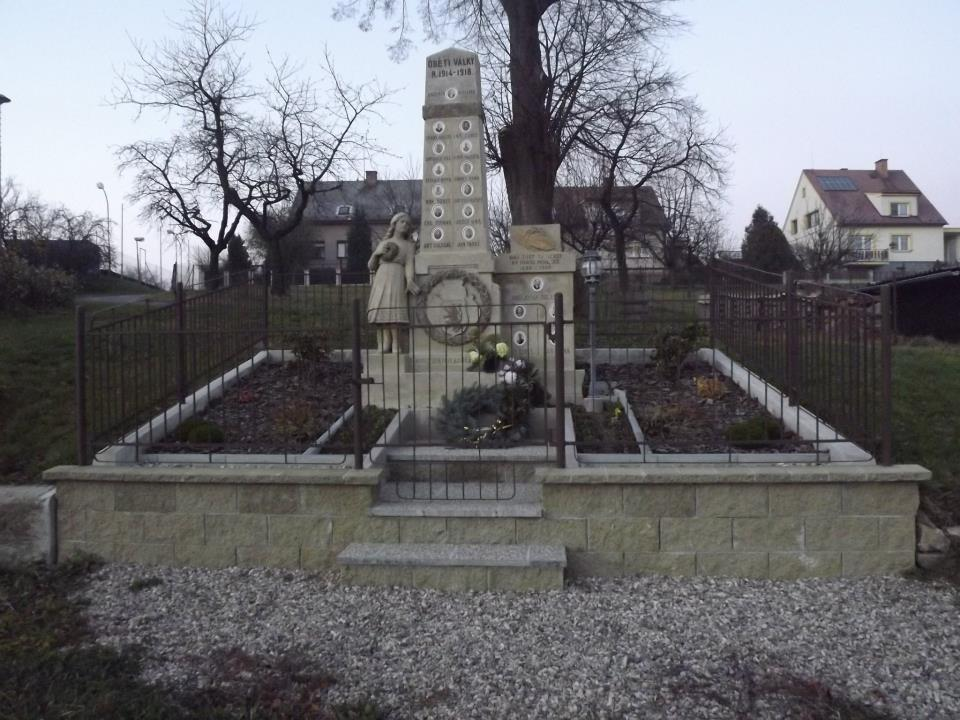
Memorial to fallen soldiers

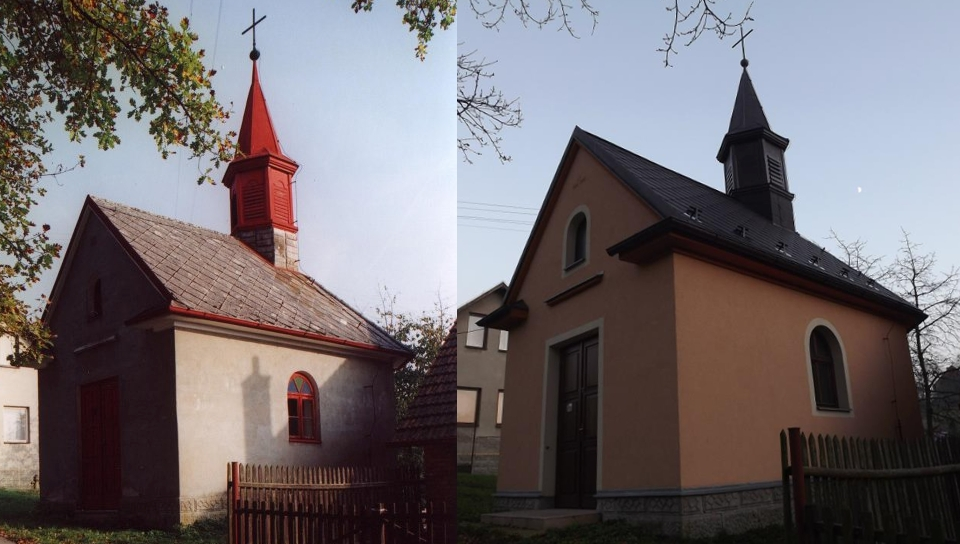
Chapel of St. Magdalene in 2007 and today

In 1900 the school was built.

25 May 1920 a monument to fallen soldiers was unveiled.

In January 1930 electricity began to be used in Zhoř.

On 25 July 1937 the chapel of St. Magdalene was consecrated by Sobol canon from Hradec Králové.

In 1948, the construction of a water supply started. In 1951 it was completed.

On 1 January 1976 Zhoř was merged with the village Němčice.

In July 1982 the village suffered a natural disaster. After a big torrential downpour, some homes were flooded with water and mud.
