= Němčičky (Brno-Country District) =

- Municipality
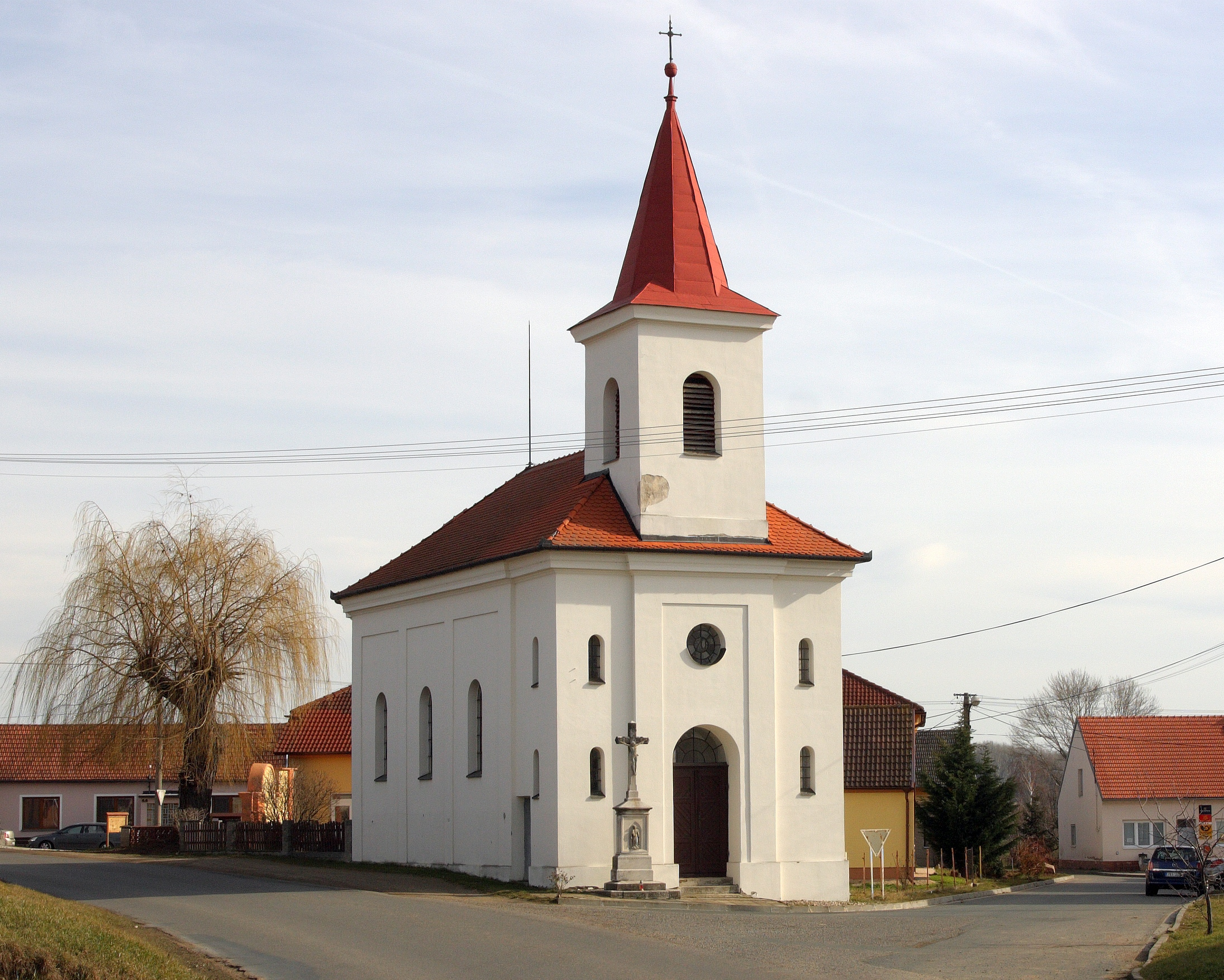
- Chapel of the Nativity of the Virgin Mary

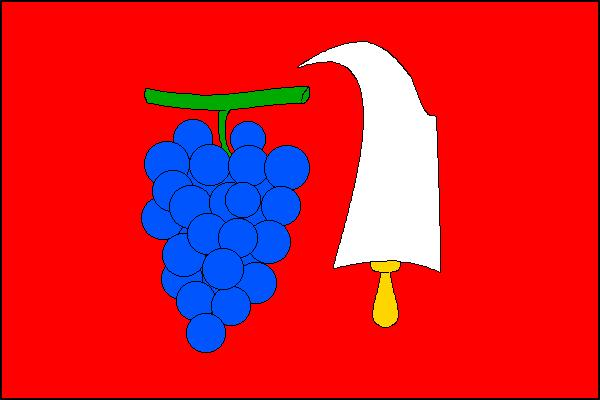
- Flag Coat of arms

- Location in the Czech Republic
- Coordinates: 49°3′1″N 16°30′2″E
- Country: Czech Republic
- Region: South Moravian
- District: Brno-Country
- First mentioned: 1354

Area
  - Total: 4.58 km^{2} (1.77 sq mi)
- Elevation: 190 m (620 ft)

Population (2026-01-01)
  - Total: 359
  - Density: 78.4/km^{2} (203/sq mi)
- Time zone: UTC+1 (CET)
  - Summer (DST): UTC+2 (CEST)
- Postal code: 664 66
- Website: www.nemcickyubrna.cz

Němčičky is a municipality and village in Brno-Country District in the South Moravian Region of the Czech Republic. It has about 400 inhabitants.

Němčičky lies approximately 19 kilometres (12 mi) south-west of Brno and 190 km (120 mi) south-east of Prague.

== Demographics ==
Historical population
Year	Pop.	±%
1869	306	—
1880	318	+3.9%
1890	341	+7.2%
1900	312	−8.5%
1910	315	+1.0%
1921	321	+1.9%
1930	333	+3.7%
1950	259	−22.2%
1961	258	−0.4%
1970	238	−7.8%
1980	251	+5.5%
1991	251	+0.0%
2001	276	+10.0%
2011	324	+17.4%
2021	314	−3.1%
Source: Censuses
