= Němčice (Domažlice District) =

- Municipality
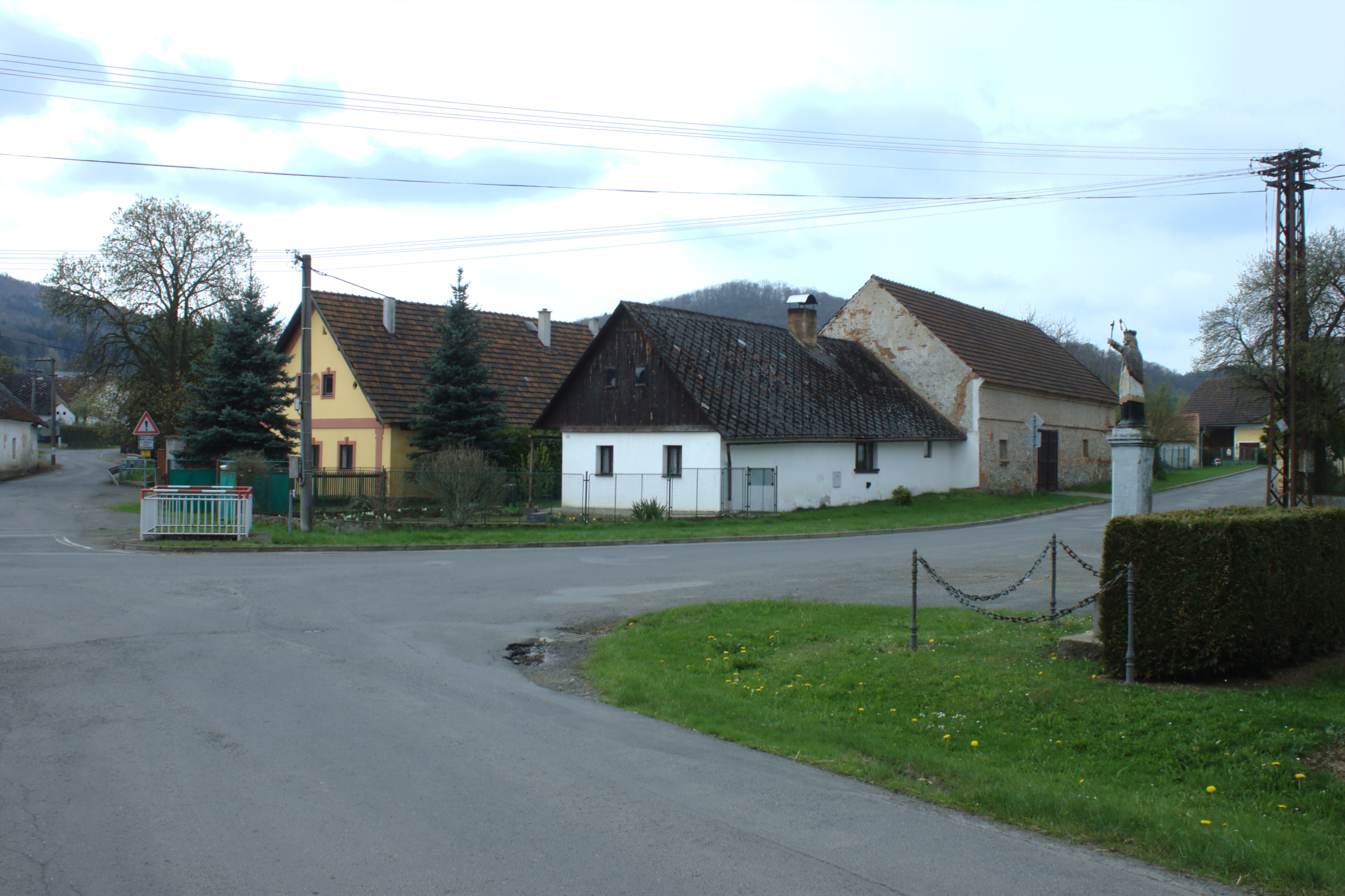
- Centre of Němčice

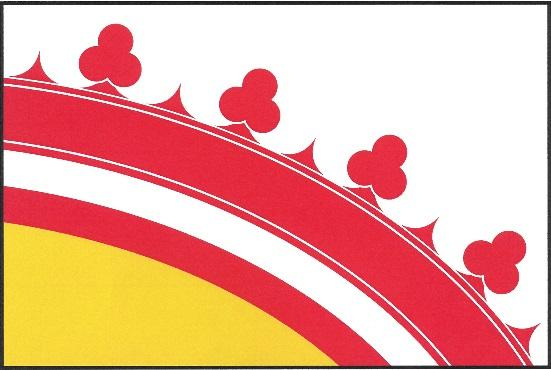
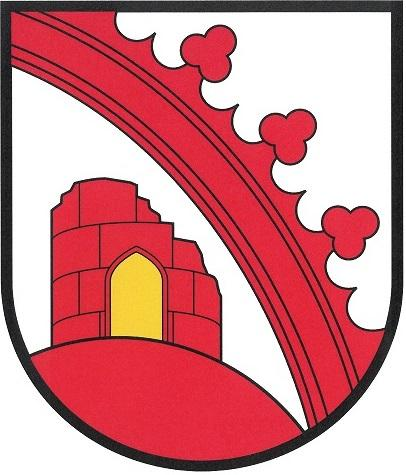
- Flag Coat of arms

- Location in the Czech Republic
- Coordinates: 49°25′31″N 13°4′39″E
- Country: Czech Republic
- Region: Plzeň
- District: Domažlice
- First mentioned: 1379

Area
  - Total: 8.93 km^{2} (3.45 sq mi)
- Elevation: 513 m (1,683 ft)

Population (2026-01-01)
  - Total: 129
  - Density: 14.4/km^{2} (37.4/sq mi)
- Time zone: UTC+1 (CET)
  - Summer (DST): UTC+2 (CEST)
- Postal code: 345 06
- Website: www.nemciceukdyne.cz

Němčice is a municipality and village in Domažlice District in the Plzeň Region of the Czech Republic. It has about 100 inhabitants.

Němčice lies approximately 11 kilometres (7 mi) east of Domažlice, 43 km (27 mi) south-west of Plzeň, and 123 km (76 mi) south-west of Prague.

== Administrative division ==
Němčice consists of two municipal parts (in brackets population according to the 2021 census):

- Němčice (119)
- Úlíkov (11)

== Demographics ==
Historical population
Year	Pop.	±%
1869	499	—
1880	430	−13.8%
1890	373	−13.3%
1900	382	+2.4%
1910	418	+9.4%
1921	423	+1.2%
1930	368	−13.0%
1950	235	−36.1%
1961	229	−2.6%
1970	213	−7.0%
1980	158	−25.8%
1991	122	−22.8%
2001	110	−9.8%
2011	134	+21.8%
2021	130	−3.0%
Source: Censuses
