= Němčice (Svitavy District) =

- Municipality
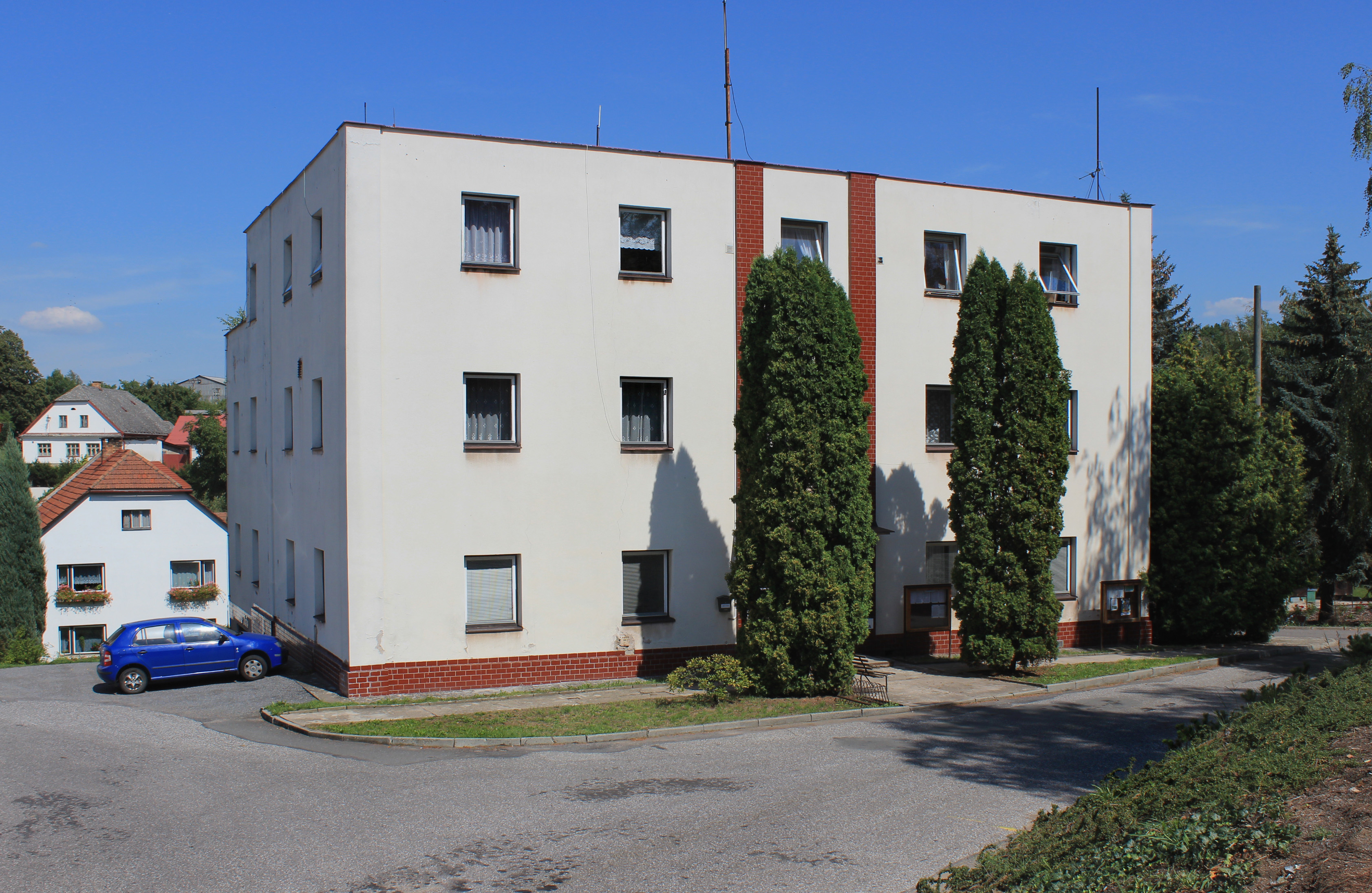
- Municipal office

- Flag Coat of arms

- Location in the Czech Republic
- Coordinates: 49°53′26″N 16°20′36″E
- Country: Czech Republic
- Region: Pardubice
- District: Svitavy
- First mentioned: 1295

Area
  - Total: 13.15 km^{2} (5.08 sq mi)
- Elevation: 385 m (1,263 ft)

Population (2026-01-01)
  - Total: 1,032
  - Density: 78.48/km^{2} (203.3/sq mi)
- Time zone: UTC+1 (CET)
  - Summer (DST): UTC+2 (CEST)
- Postal code: 561 18
- Website: nemcice.uo.cz

Němčice is a municipality and village in Svitavy District in the Pardubice Region of the Czech Republic. It has about 1,000 inhabitants.

== Administrative division ==
Němčice consists of four municipal parts (in brackets population according to the 2021 census):

- Němčice (485)
- Člupek (219)
- Pudilka (19)
- Zhoř (287)

== Etymology ==
The name is derived from the personal name Němec, meaning "the village of Němec's people".

== Geography ==
Němčice is located about 17 kilometres (11 mi) northwest of Svitavy and 42 km (26 mi) southeast of Pardubice. It lies in the Svitavy Uplands. The highest point is the hill Zhořský kopec at 559 m (1,834 ft) above sea level.

The village of Němčice is a linear village situated along the stream Zlatý pásek. There are eight watermills in the municipality built along the stream.

== History ==
The first written mention of Němčice is from 1295. The village was probably founded between 1240 and 1260 during the colonisation of Litomyšl surroundings. The village of Zhoř was founded after 1227, Člupek in 1695 and Pudilka in 1697.

The municipality of Němčice was created by merger of Němčice, Člupek and Pudilka in 1850. Zhoř was joined in 1976.

From 1 January 2007, Němčice is no longer a part of Ústí nad Orlicí District and belongs to Svitavy District.

== Demographics ==
Historical population

| Year | Pop. | ±% |
|---|---|---|
| 1869 | 1,505 | — |
| 1880 | 1,530 | +1.7% |
| 1890 | 1,516 | −0.9% |
| 1900 | 1,481 | −2.3% |
| 1910 | 1,437 | −3.0% |

| Year | Pop. | ±% |
|---|---|---|
| 1921 | 1,420 | −1.2% |
| 1930 | 1,340 | −5.6% |
| 1950 | 1,085 | −19.0% |
| 1961 | 1,128 | +4.0% |
| 1970 | 999 | −11.4% |

| Year | Pop. | ±% |
|---|---|---|
| 1980 | 990 | −0.9% |
| 1991 | 899 | −9.2% |
| 2001 | 892 | −0.8% |
| 2011 | 935 | +4.8% |
| 2021 | 1,010 | +8.0% |

Source: Censuses

== Transport ==
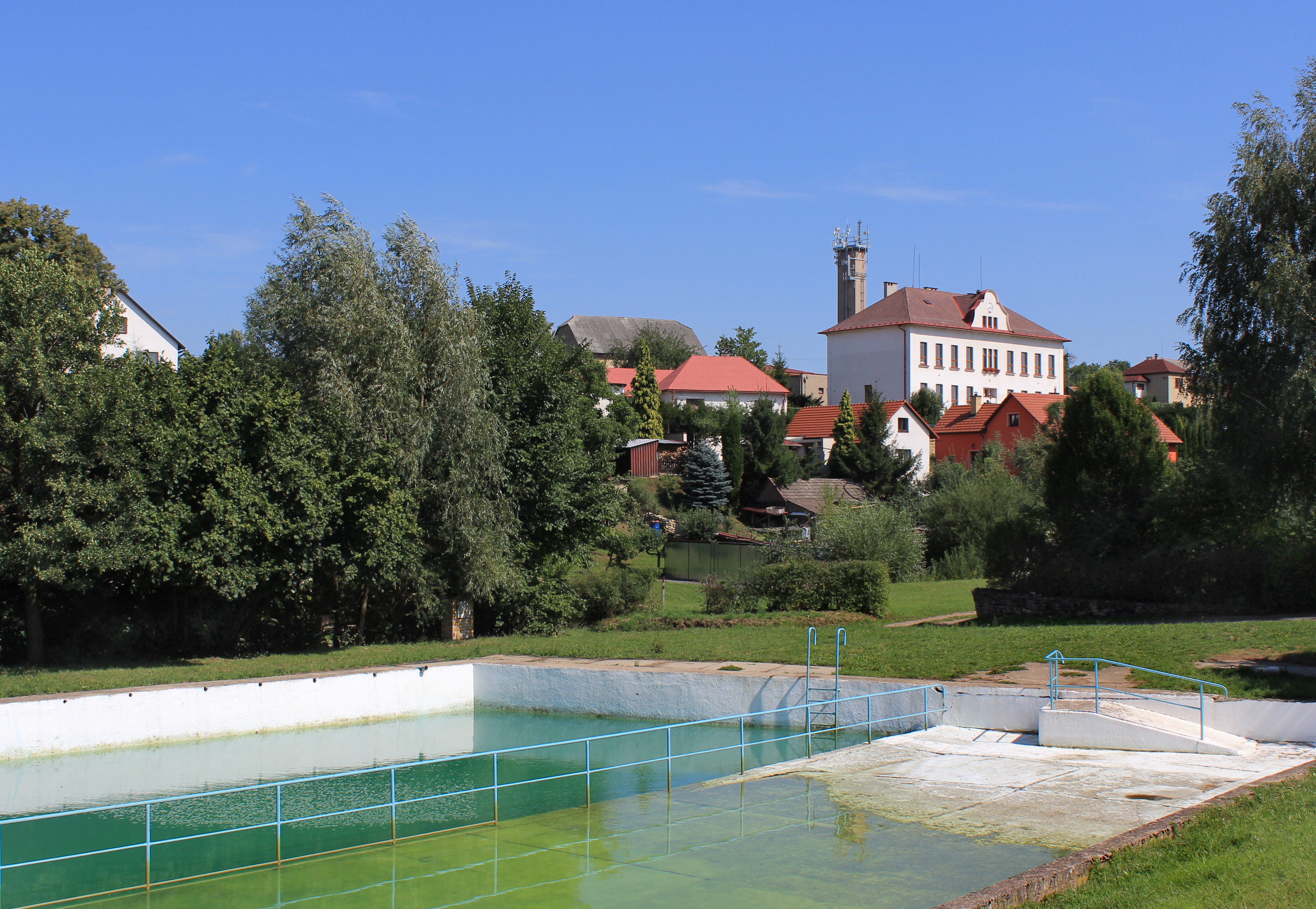
Swimming pool and primary school

There are no railways or major roads passing through the municipality.

== Sights ==
Němčice is poor in monuments. The only protected cultural monuments are the former inn, which is a half-timbered building from the early 19th century, and a Baroque water mill. A landmark of the centre of Němčice is the Chapel of Saint John the Baptist. It dates from 1883.
