= Němčice (Pardubice District) =

- Municipality
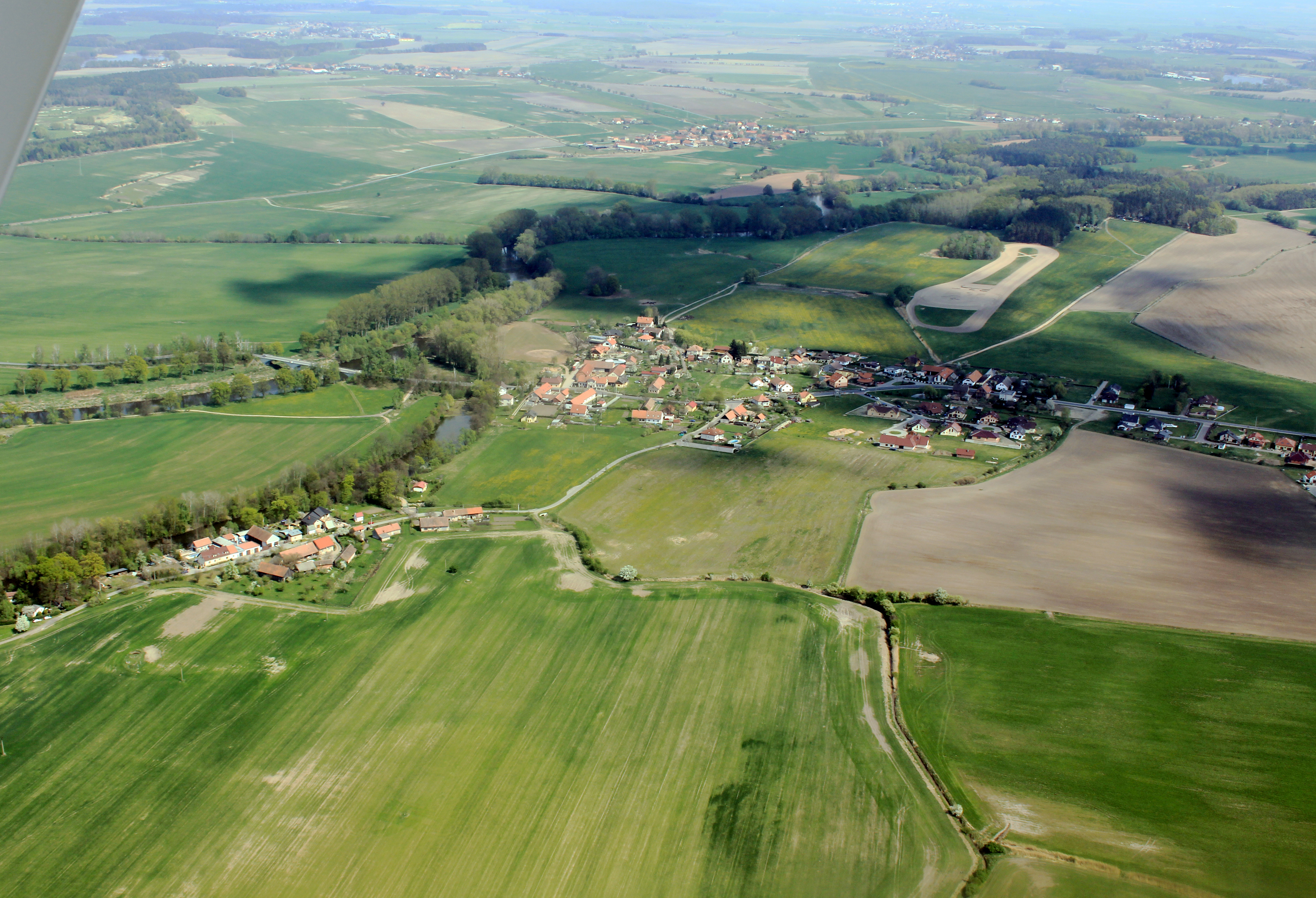
- Aerial view

- Flag Coat of arms

- Location in the Czech Republic
- Coordinates: 50°5′35″N 15°48′21″E
- Country: Czech Republic
- Region: Pardubice
- District: Pardubice
- First mentioned: 1436

Area
  - Total: 2.55 km^{2} (0.98 sq mi)
- Elevation: 225 m (738 ft)

Population (2026-01-01)
  - Total: 833
  - Density: 327/km^{2} (846/sq mi)
- Time zone: UTC+1 (CET)
  - Summer (DST): UTC+2 (CEST)
- Postal code: 533 52
- Website: www.obecnemcice.cz

Němčice is a municipality and village in Pardubice District in the Pardubice Region of the Czech Republic. It has about 800 inhabitants.

== Demographics ==
Historical population
Year	Pop.	±%
1869	212	—
1880	236	+11.3%
1890	236	+0.0%
1900	181	−23.3%
1910	171	−5.5%
1921	173	+1.2%
1930	203	+17.3%
1950	148	−27.1%
1961	146	−1.4%
1970	127	−13.0%
1980	121	−4.7%
1991	114	−5.8%
2001	121	+6.1%
2011	550	+354.5%
2021	761	+38.4%
Source: Censuses
