= Jeníkovice (Pardubice District) =

- Municipality
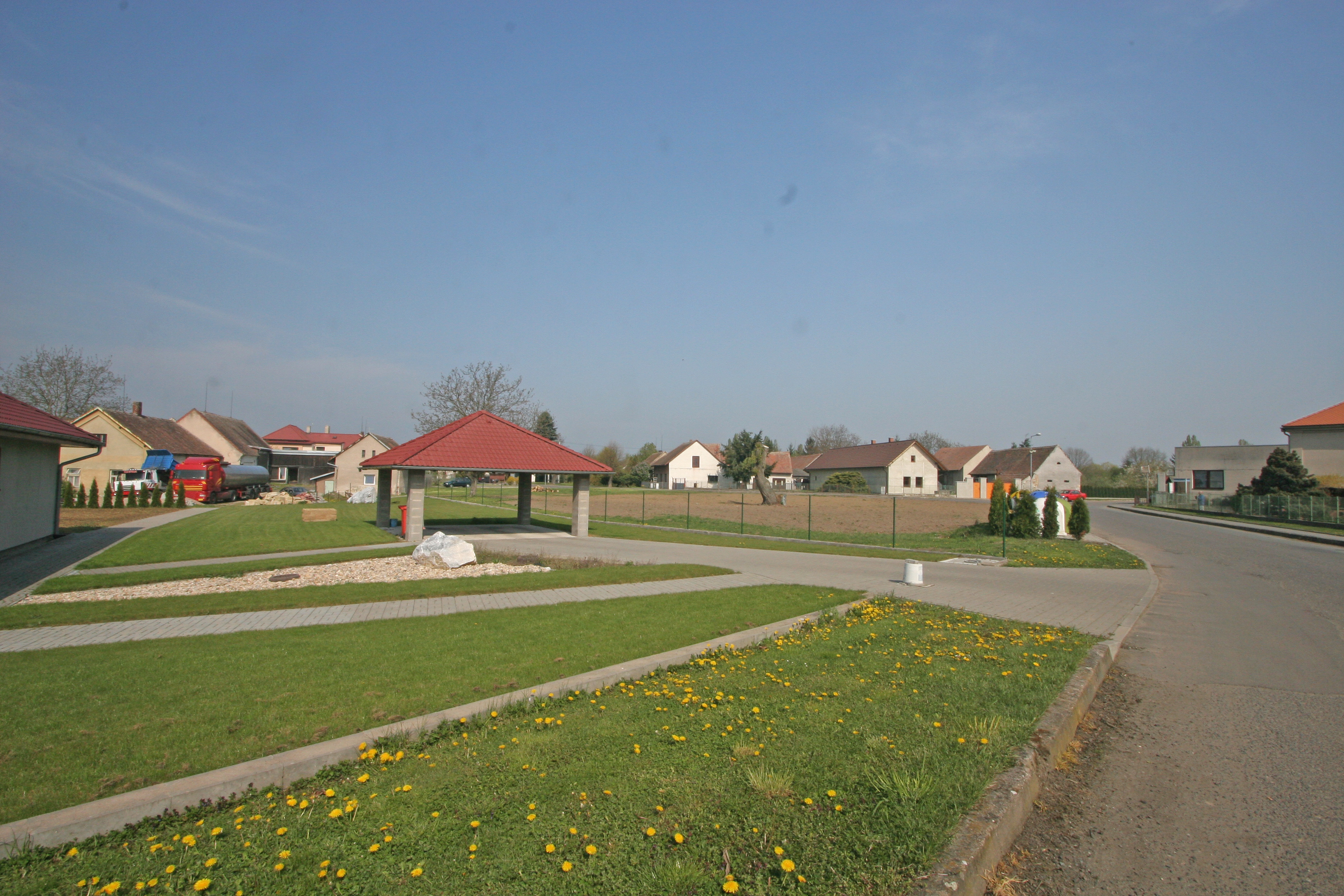
- Centre of Jeníkovice

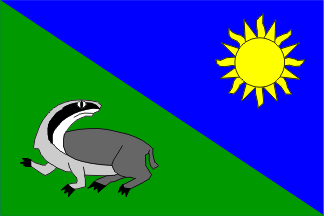
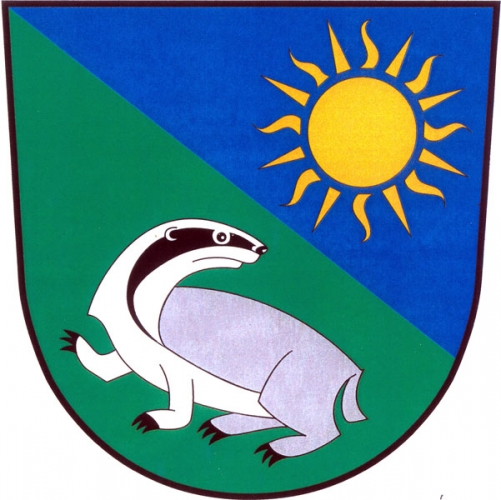
- Flag Coat of arms

- Location in the Czech Republic
- Coordinates: 49°58′54″N 15°39′38″E
- Country: Czech Republic
- Region: Pardubice
- District: Pardubice
- First mentioned: 1227

Area
  - Total: 3.22 km^{2} (1.24 sq mi)
- Elevation: 258 m (846 ft)

Population (2026-01-01)
  - Total: 242
  - Density: 75.2/km^{2} (195/sq mi)
- Time zone: UTC+1 (CET)
  - Summer (DST): UTC+2 (CEST)
- Postal code: 535 01
- Website: www.jenikovice.cz

Jeníkovice is a municipality and village in Pardubice District in the Pardubice Region of the Czech Republic. It has about 200 inhabitants.

== Demographics ==
Historical population
Year	Pop.	±%
1869	387	—
1880	418	+8.0%
1890	395	−5.5%
1900	354	−10.4%
1910	408	+15.3%
1921	409	+0.2%
1930	361	−11.7%
1950	268	−25.8%
1961	273	+1.9%
1970	249	−8.8%
1980	246	−1.2%
1991	214	−13.0%
2001	231	+7.9%
2011	234	+1.3%
2021	237	+1.3%
Source: Censuses
