= Zhoř u Tábora =

- Municipality
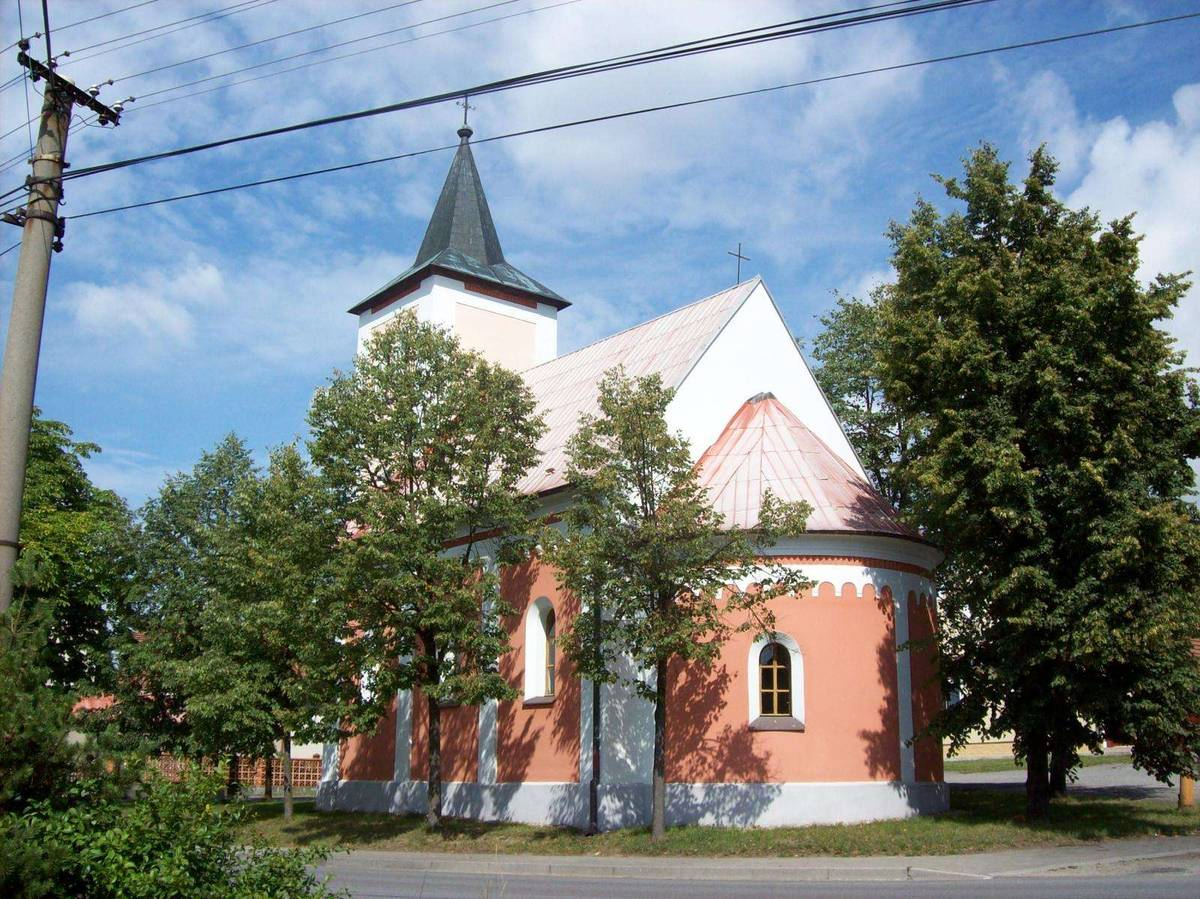
- Chapel of the Assumption of the Virgin Mary

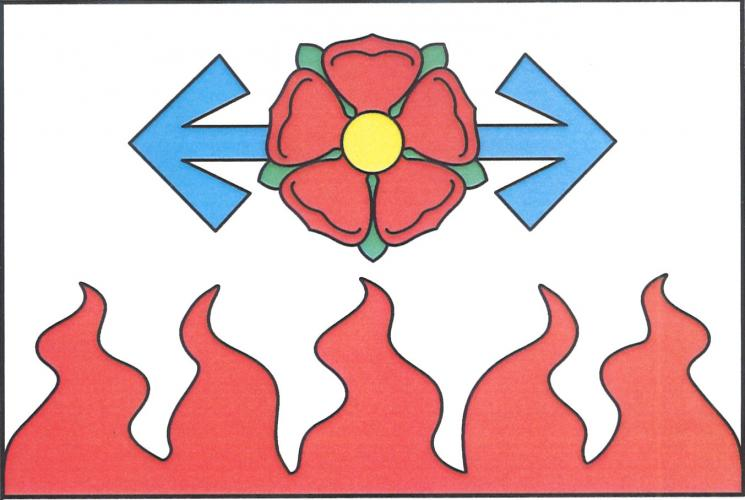
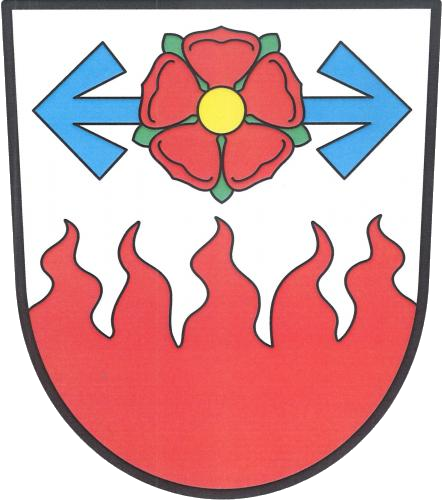
- Flag Coat of arms

- Location in the Czech Republic
- Coordinates: 49°21′27″N 14°39′27″E
- Country: Czech Republic
- Region: South Bohemian
- District: Tábor
- First mentioned: 1390

Area
  - Total: 4.62 km^{2} (1.78 sq mi)
- Elevation: 445 m (1,460 ft)

Population (2026-01-01)
  - Total: 177
  - Density: 38.3/km^{2} (99.2/sq mi)
- Time zone: UTC+1 (CET)
  - Summer (DST): UTC+2 (CEST)
- Postal code: 390 02
- Website: www.zhorutabora.cz

Zhoř u Tábora is a municipality and village in Tábor District in the South Bohemian Region of the Czech Republic. It has about 200 inhabitants.

Zhoř u Tábora lies approximately 7 kilometres (4 mi) south of Tábor, 45 km (28 mi) north of České Budějovice, and 83 km (52 mi) south of Prague.

== Demographics ==
Historical population
Year	Pop.	±%
1869	257	—
1880	284	+10.5%
1890	271	−4.6%
1900	278	+2.6%
1910	278	+0.0%
1921	267	−4.0%
1930	261	−2.2%
1950	227	−13.0%
1961	187	−17.6%
1970	183	−2.1%
1980	178	−2.7%
1991	158	−11.2%
2001	159	+0.6%
2011	175	+10.1%
2021	162	−7.4%
Source: Censuses
