= Ohaře =

- Municipality
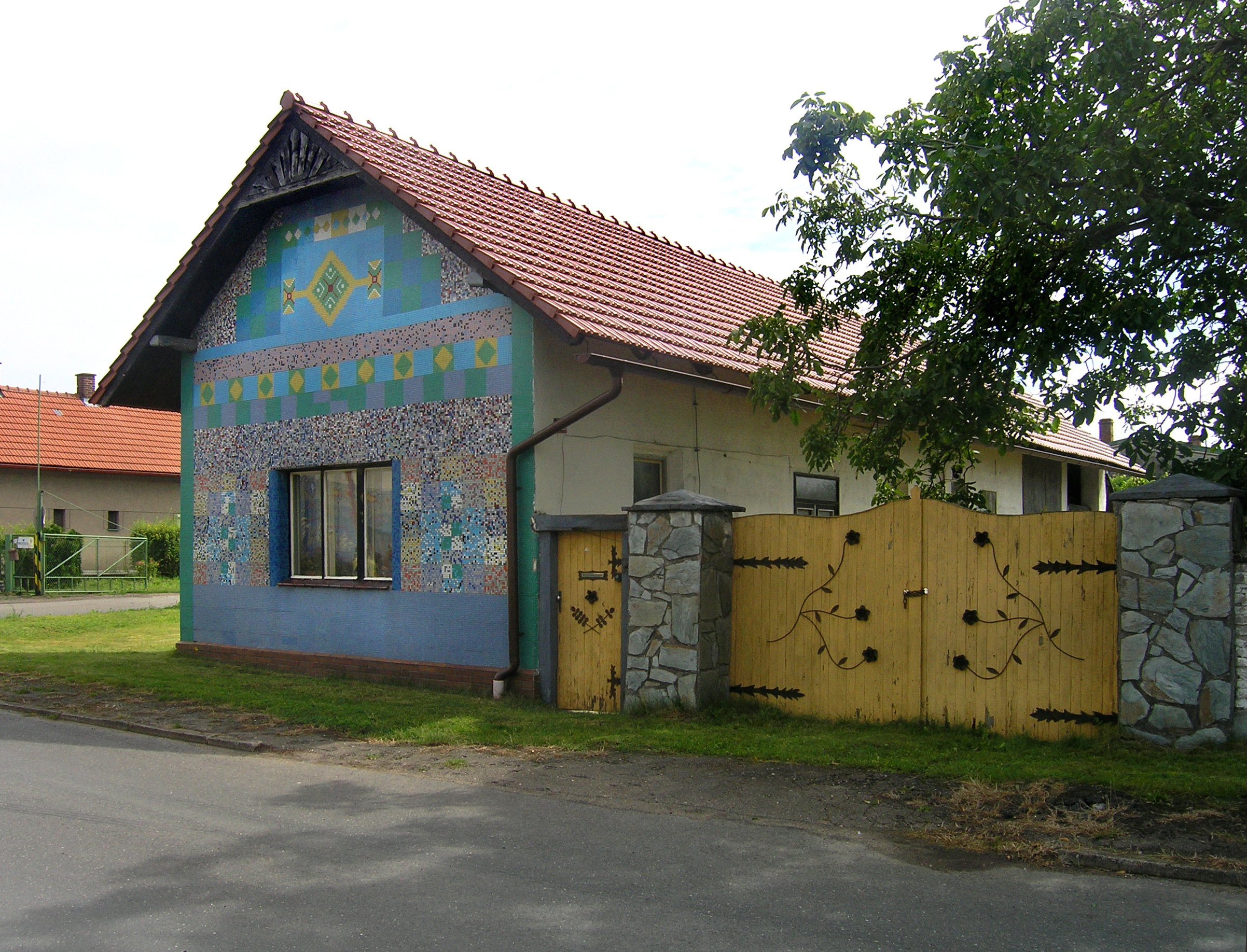
- House decorated with mosaics

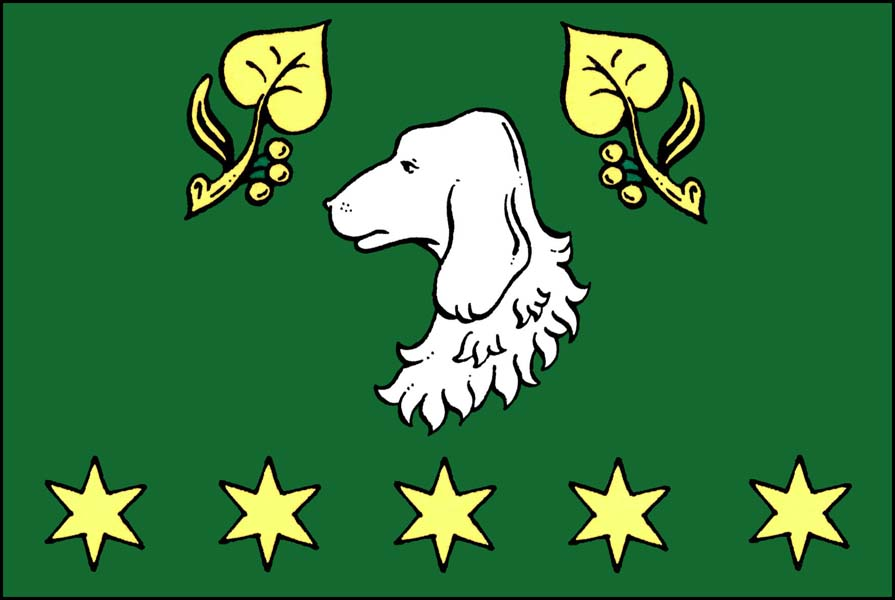
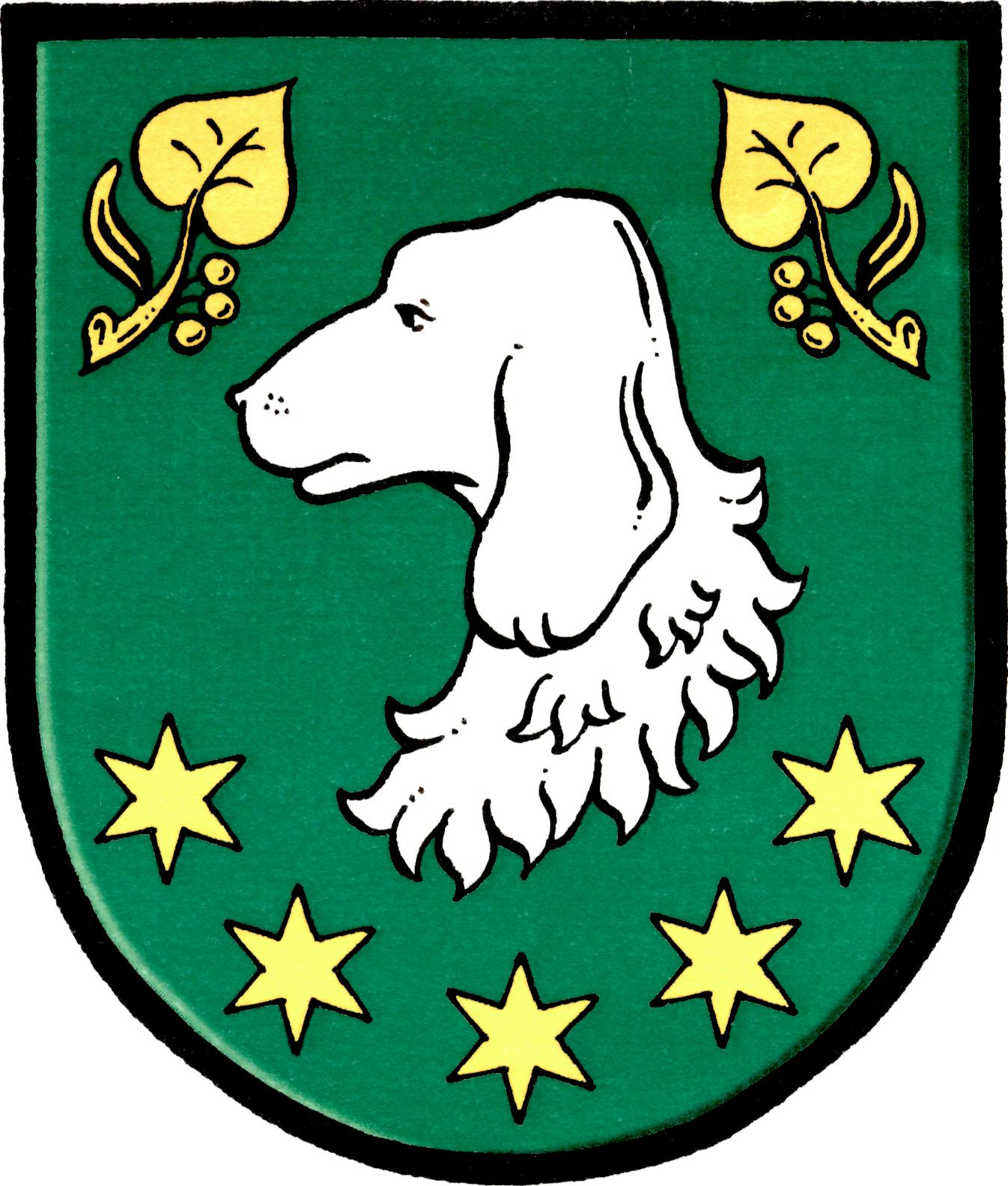
- Flag Coat of arms

- Location in the Czech Republic
- Coordinates: 50°5′52″N 15°17′42″E
- Country: Czech Republic
- Region: Central Bohemian
- District: Kolín
- First mentioned: 1397

Area
  - Total: 6.04 km^{2} (2.33 sq mi)
- Elevation: 225 m (738 ft)

Population (2026-01-01)
  - Total: 329
  - Density: 54.5/km^{2} (141/sq mi)
- Time zone: UTC+1 (CET)
  - Summer (DST): UTC+2 (CEST)
- Postal code: 281 30
- Website: www.ohare.cz

Ohaře is a municipality and village in Kolín District in the Central Bohemian Region of the Czech Republic. It has about 300 inhabitants.

== Demographics ==
Historical population
Year	Pop.	±%
1869	596	—
1880	587	−1.5%
1890	624	+6.3%
1900	674	+8.0%
1910	750	+11.3%
1921	676	−9.9%
1930	593	−12.3%
1950	489	−17.5%
1961	459	−6.1%
1970	380	−17.2%
1980	304	−20.0%
1991	282	−7.2%
2001	248	−12.1%
2011	289	+16.5%
2021	294	+1.7%
Source: Censuses
