= Zhoř u Mladé Vožice =

- Municipality
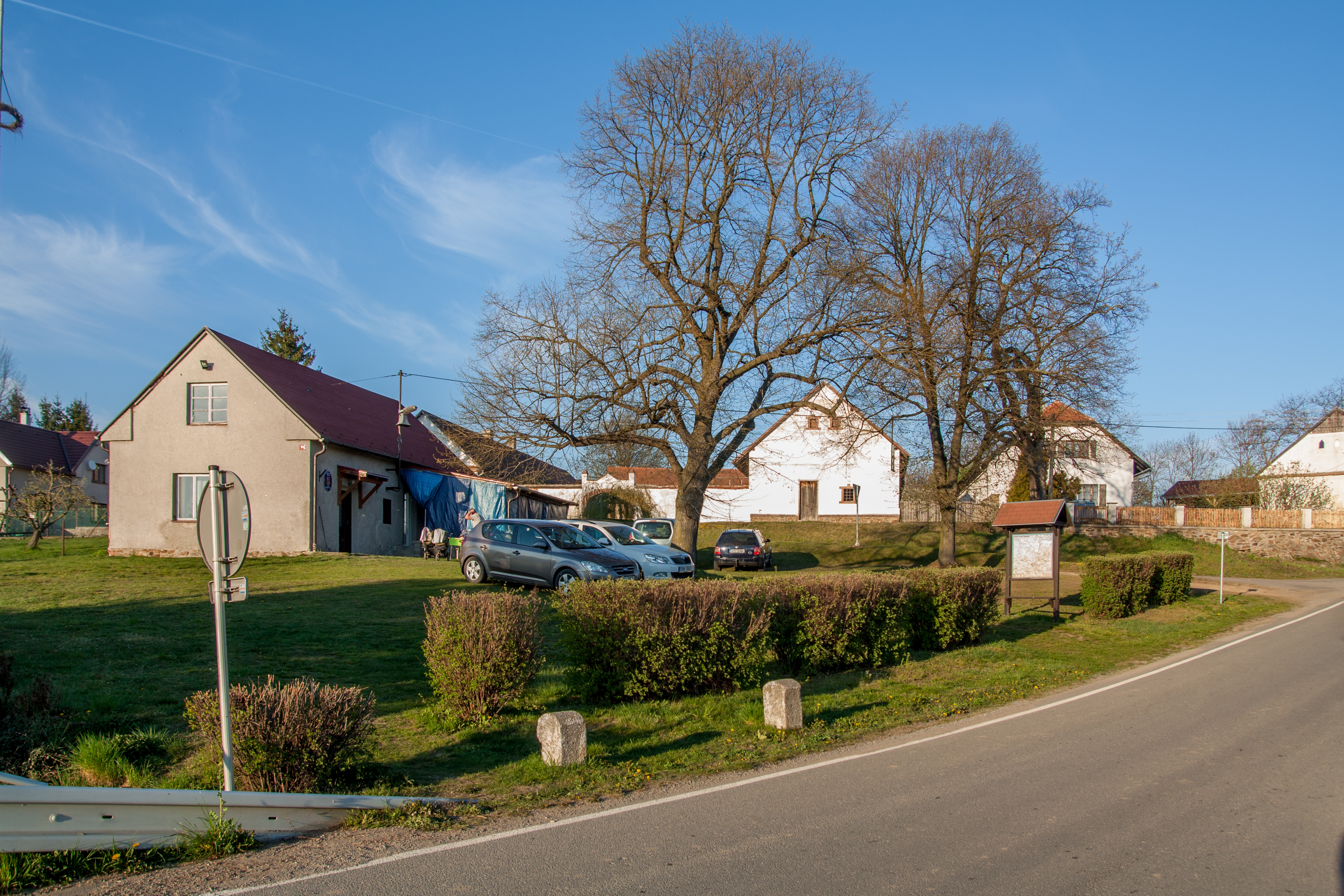
- Centre of Zhoř u Mladé Vožice

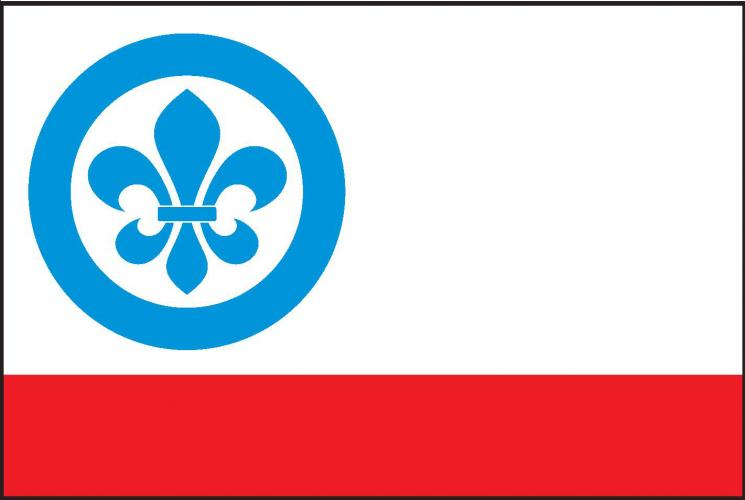
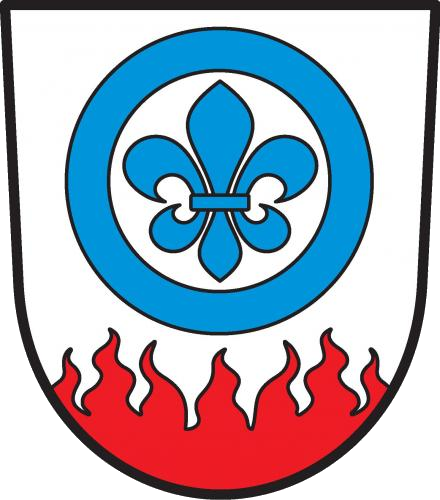
- Flag Coat of arms

- Location in the Czech Republic
- Coordinates: 49°32′37″N 14°45′54″E
- Country: Czech Republic
- Region: South Bohemian
- District: Tábor
- First mentioned: 1357

Area
  - Total: 3.17 km^{2} (1.22 sq mi)
- Elevation: 466 m (1,529 ft)

Population (2026-01-01)
  - Total: 115
  - Density: 36.3/km^{2} (94.0/sq mi)
- Time zone: UTC+1 (CET)
  - Summer (DST): UTC+2 (CEST)
- Postal code: 391 43
- Website: www.zhorumladevozice.cz

Zhoř u Mladé Vožice is a municipality and village in Tábor District in the South Bohemian Region of the Czech Republic. It has about 100 inhabitants.

Zhoř u Mladé Vožice lies approximately 16 kilometres (10 mi) north-east of Tábor, 66 km (41 mi) north of České Budějovice, and 66 km (41 mi) south of Prague.

== Demographics ==
Historical population
Year	Pop.	±%
1869	238	—
1880	224	−5.9%
1890	205	−8.5%
1900	194	−5.4%
1910	216	+11.3%
1921	204	−5.6%
1930	193	−5.4%
1950	143	−25.9%
1961	145	+1.4%
1970	116	−20.0%
1980	94	−19.0%
1991	89	−5.3%
2001	90	+1.1%
2011	99	+10.0%
2021	103	+4.0%
Source: Censuses
