= Meclov =

- Municipality
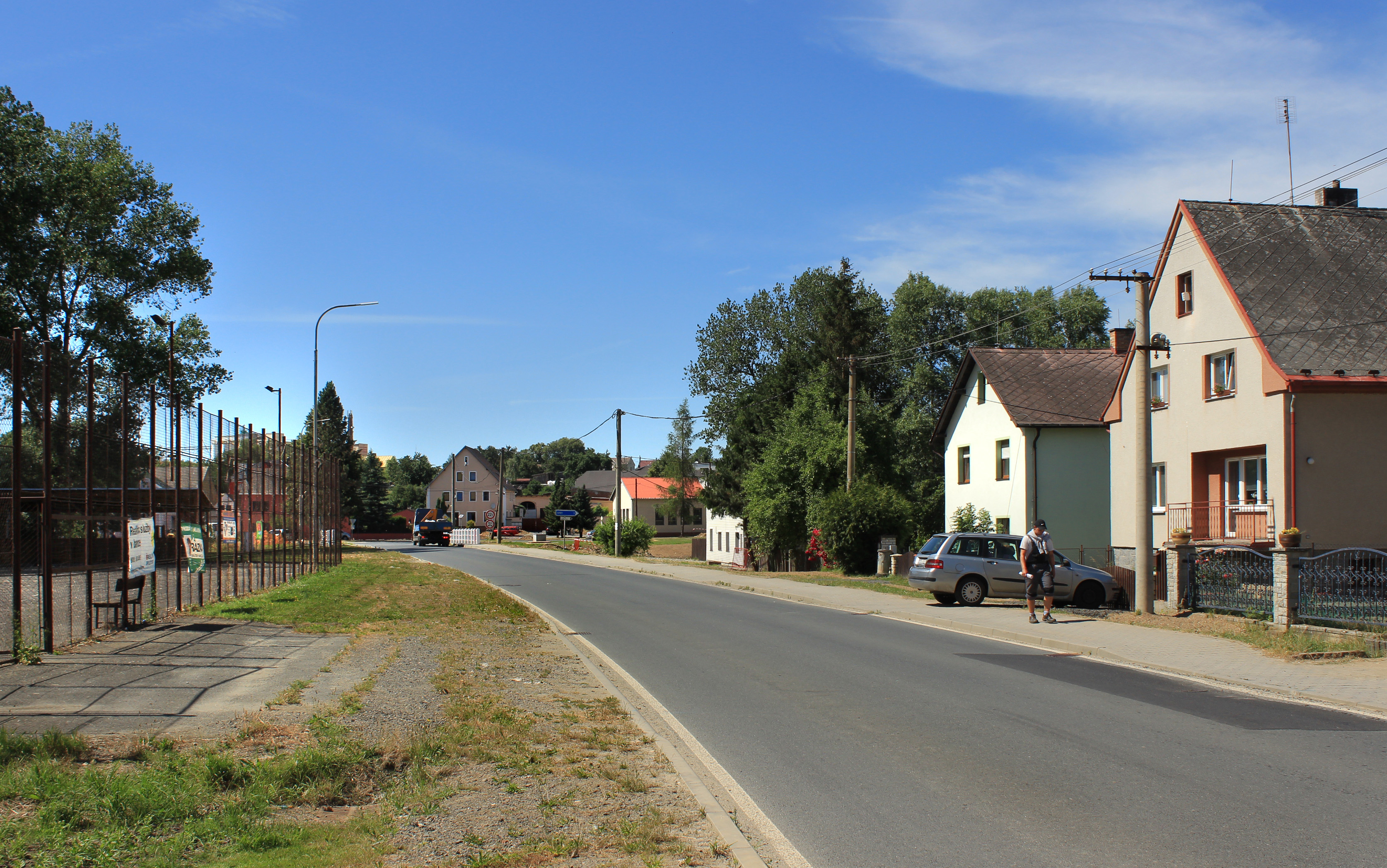
- Main road in Meclov

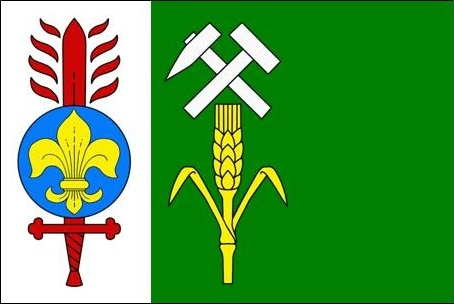
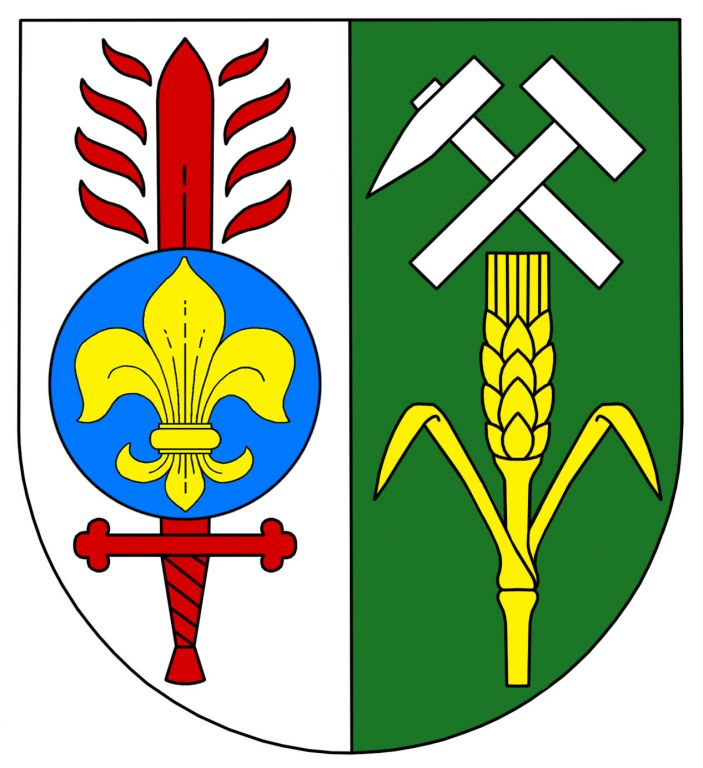
- Flag Coat of arms

- Location in the Czech Republic
- Coordinates: 49°30′29″N 12°52′40″E
- Country: Czech Republic
- Region: Plzeň
- District: Domažlice
- First mentioned: 1115

Area
  - Total: 31.98 km^{2} (12.35 sq mi)
- Elevation: 396 m (1,299 ft)

Population (2026-01-01)
  - Total: 1,220
  - Density: 38.1/km^{2} (98.8/sq mi)
- Time zone: UTC+1 (CET)
  - Summer (DST): UTC+2 (CEST)
- Postal codes: 345 21, 346 01
- Website: www.obecmeclov.cz

Meclov (German: Metzling) is a municipality and village in Domažlice District in the Plzeň Region of the Czech Republic. It has about 1,200 inhabitants.

Meclov lies approximately 9 kilometres (6 mi) north-west of Domažlice, 45 km (28 mi) south-west of Plzeň, and 129 km (80 mi) south-west of Prague.

== Administrative division ==
Meclov consists of nine municipal parts (in brackets population according to the 2021 census):

- Meclov (683)
- Bozdíš (14)
- Březí (56)
- Jeníkovice (6)
- Mašovice (71)
- Mračnice (54)
- Mrchojedy (29)
- Němčice (27)
- Třebnice (255)

== Demographics ==
Historical population
Year	Pop.	±%
1869	1,602	—
1880	1,631	+1.8%
1890	1,543	−5.4%
1900	1,676	+8.6%
1910	1,767	+5.4%
1921	1,869	+5.8%
1930	1,963	+5.0%
1950	1,134	−42.2%
1961	1,128	−0.5%
1970	1,133	+0.4%
1980	1,016	−10.3%
1991	946	−6.9%
2001	1,009	+6.7%
2011	1,124	+11.4%
2021	1,195	+6.3%
Source: Censuses
