= Pohořelice (administrative district) =

Administrative district in the South Moravian Region, Czech Republic

Administrative district of the municipality with extended powers of Pohořelice Správní obvod obce s rozšířenou působností Pohořelice
- Administrative district of municipality with extended powers
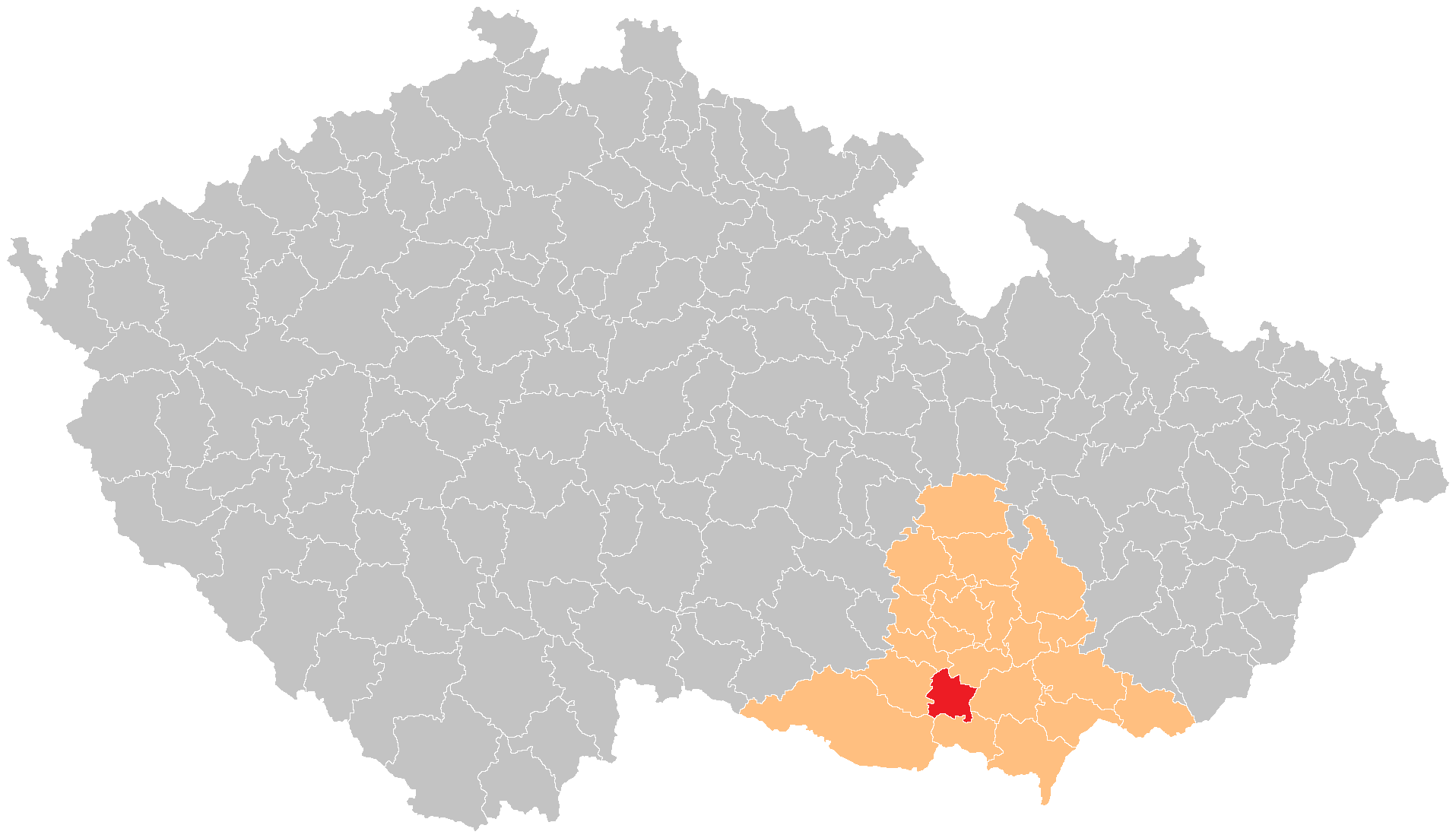
- Location in the South Moravian Region within the Czech Republic
- Coordinates: 49°9′N 17°3′E
- Country: Czech Republic
- Region: South Moravian
- District: Brno-Country
- Municipality with extended powers: Pohořelice

Area
  - Total: 195.21 km^{2} (75.37 sq mi)

Population (2024)
  - Total: 16,139
  - Density: 82.675/km^{2} (214.13/sq mi)
- Time zone: UTC+1 (CET)
  - Summer (DST): UTC+2 (CEST)
- Municipalities: 13
- * Cities and towns: 1
- * Market towns: 1

The administrative district of the municipality with extended powers of Pohořelice (abbreviated AD MEP Pohořelice; Czech: Správní obvod obce s rozšířenou působností Pohořelice, SO ORP Pohořelice) is an administrative district of municipality with extended powers in Brno-Country District in the South Moravian Region of the Czech Republic. It has existed since 1 January 2003, when the districts were replaced administratively, and has been part of Brno-Country District since 1 January 2007. It includes 13 municipalities which have a combined population of about 16,000.

== Municipalities ==
Cities and towns are in bold, and market towns are in italics.

Municipality	Population	Area (km^{2)}	Density
Branišovice	635	11.06	57
Cvrčovice	674	9.29	73
Ivaň	811	11.72	69
Loděnice	608	8.67	70
Malešovice	829	9.20	90
Odrovice	240	4.80	50
Pasohlávky	775	26.66	29
**Pohořelice**	6,071	43.05	141
Přibice	1,085	7.45	145
Šumice	312	8.62	36
Troskotovice	712	18.05	39
Vlasatice	939	22.87	41
Vranovice	2,448	13.83	177

== Demographics ==
Historical population

Year	Pop.	±%
1869	13,296	—
1880	15,216	+14.4%
1890	15,910	+4.6%
1900	16,232	+2.0%
1910	16,836	+3.7%

Year	Pop.	±%
1921	17,223	+2.3%
1930	18,016	+4.6%
1950	12,771	−29.1%
1961	13,436	+5.2%
1970	13,180	−1.9%

Year	Pop.	±%
1980	13,002	−1.4%
1991	12,414	−4.5%
2001	12,399	−0.1%
2011	13,167	+6.2%
2021	14,730	+11.9%

Source: Censuses
