= Šumice =

Šumice may refer to places:

== Bosnia and Herzegovina ==
- Šumice (Višegrad), a village in the municipality of Višegrad

== Czech Republic ==
- Šumice (Brno-Country District), a municipality and village in the South Moravian Region
- Šumice (Uherské Hradiště District), a municipality and village in the Zlín Region
- Viničné Šumice, a municipality and village in the South Moravian Region

== Romania ==
- Șumița (Czech: Šumice), a village in the Lăpușnicel commune

== Serbia ==
- Šumice (Belgrade), a park and urban neighborhood of Belgrade
- Gornje Livade, Novi Sad, also called Šumice, an urban neighborhood of Novi Sad
