= Cvrčovice =

Cvrčovice may refer to places in the Czech Republic:

- Cvrčovice (Brno-Country District), a municipality and village in the South Moravian Region
- Cvrčovice (Kladno District), a municipality and village in the Central Bohemian Region
- Cvrčovice, a village and part of Zdounky in the Zlín Region
