= Pohořelice (disambiguation) =

Pohořelice may refer to places in the Czech Republic:

- Pohořelice, a town in the South Moravian Region
- Pohořelice (Zlín District), a municipality and village in the Zlín Region
- Pohořelice, a hamlet and part of Nadějkov in the South Bohemian Region
