= Bantice =

- Municipality
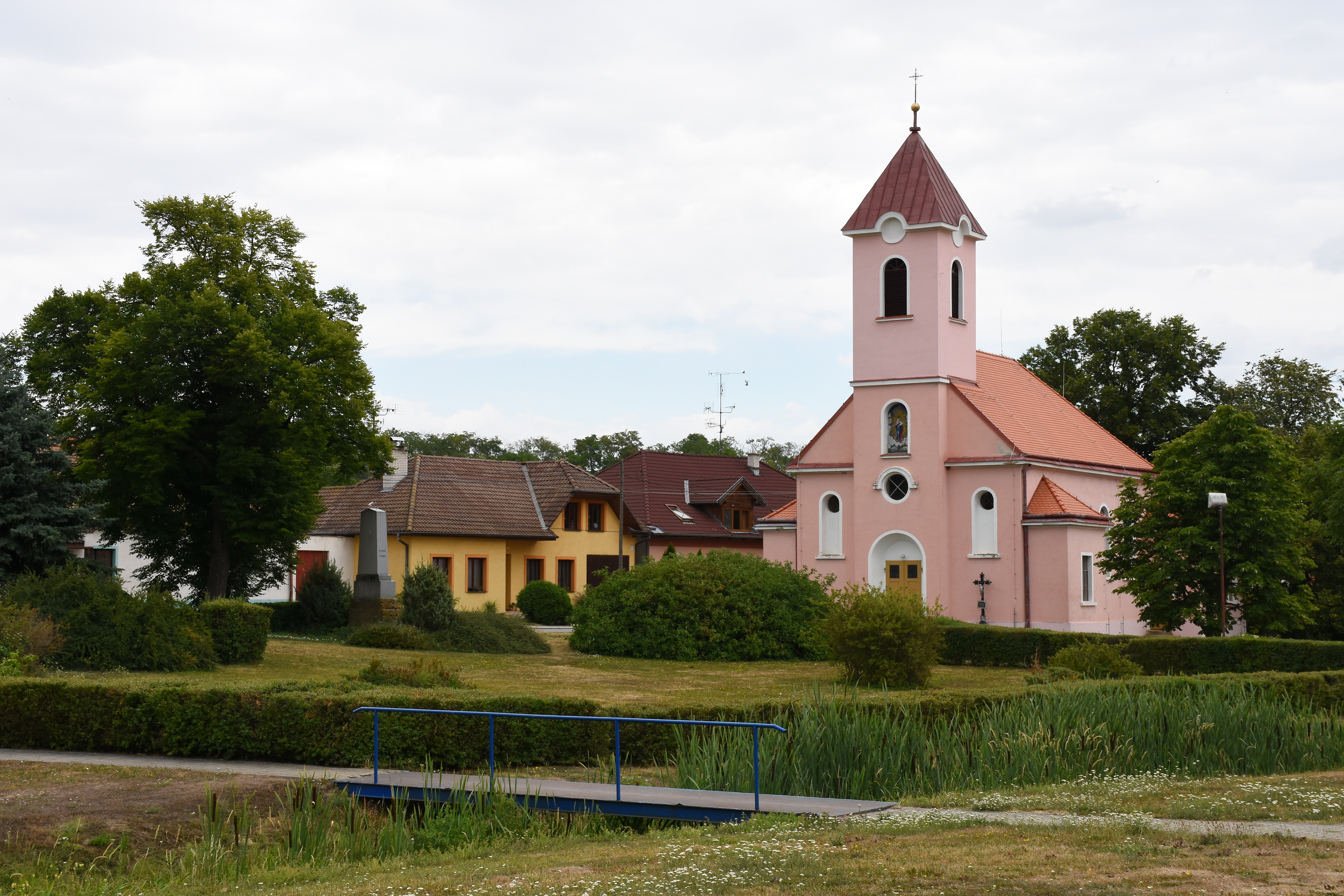
- Centre of Bantice with the Chapel of the Assumption of the Virgin Mary

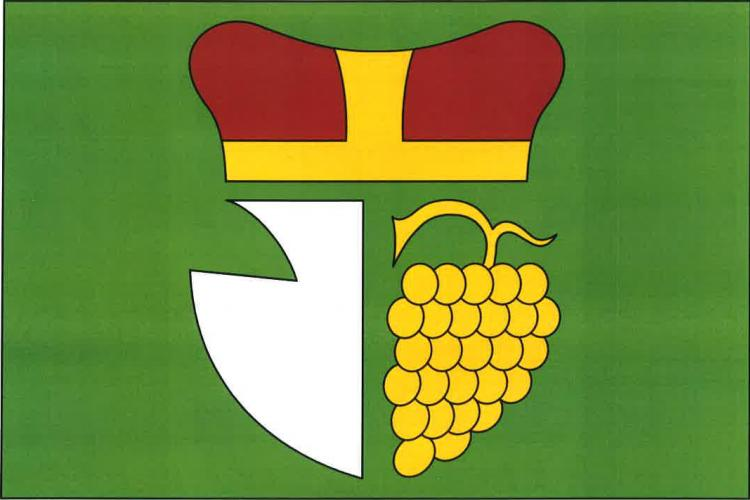
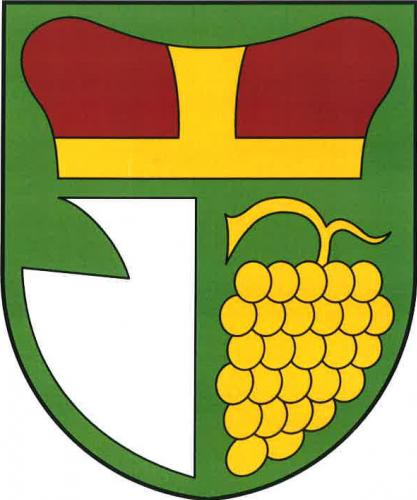
- Flag Coat of arms

- Location in the Czech Republic
- Coordinates: 48°52′59″N 16°10′57″E
- Country: Czech Republic
- Region: South Moravian
- District: Znojmo
- First mentioned: 1046

Area
  - Total: 3.76 km^{2} (1.45 sq mi)
- Elevation: 213 m (699 ft)

Population (2026-01-01)
  - Total: 294
  - Density: 78.2/km^{2} (203/sq mi)
- Time zone: UTC+1 (CET)
  - Summer (DST): UTC+2 (CEST)
- Postal code: 671 61
- Website: www.bantice.cz

Bantice (German: Panditz) is a municipality and village in Znojmo District in the South Moravian Region of the Czech Republic. It has about 300 inhabitants.

== Geography ==
Bantice is located about 10 kilometres (6 mi) east of Znojmo and 46 km (29 mi) southwest of Brno. It lies in a flat agricultural landscape in the Dyje–Svratka Valley. The Únanovka Stream flows through the municipality.

== History ==
The first written mention of Bantice is from 1046.

== Demographics ==
Historical population

Year	Pop.	±%
1869	323	—
1880	305	−5.6%
1890	336	+10.2%
1900	372	+10.7%
1910	373	+0.3%

Year	Pop.	±%
1921	389	+4.3%
1930	390	+0.3%
1950	309	−20.8%
1961	341	+10.4%
1970	283	−17.0%

Year	Pop.	±%
1980	225	−20.5%
1991	194	−13.8%
2001	190	−2.1%
2011	285	+50.0%
2021	286	+0.4%

Source: Censuses

== Transport ==
The I/53 road from Znojmo to Pohořelice runs through the southern part of the municipality.

== Sights ==
There are no protected cultural monuments in the municipality.

The main landmark of Bantice is the Chapel of the Assumption of the Virgin Mary. It was built in 1933, when it replaced a chapel from 1832.
