= Oleksovice =

- Market town
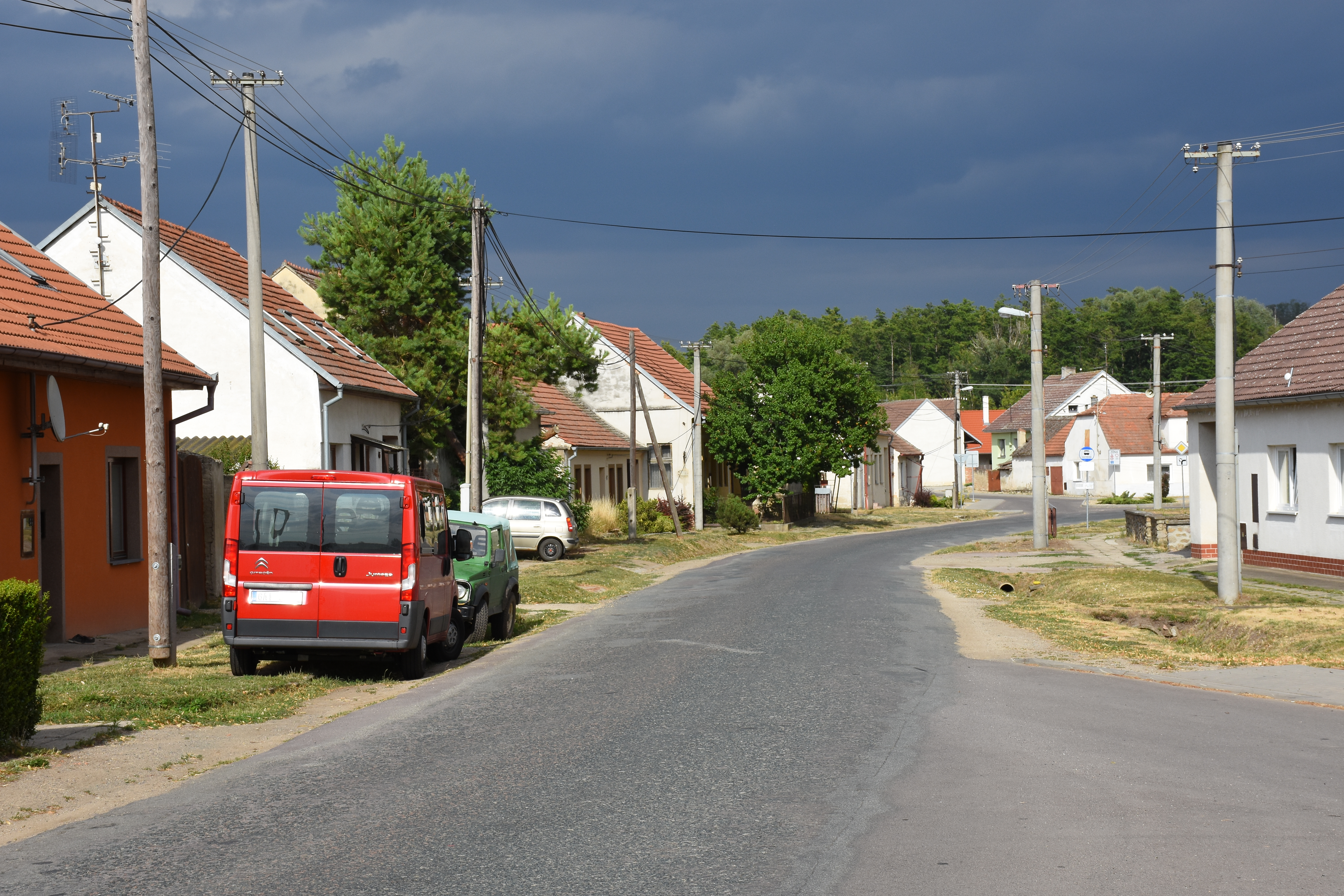
- Northern part of Oleksovice

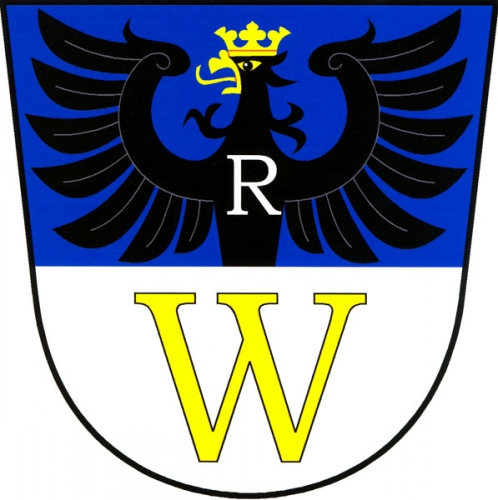
- Flag Coat of arms

- Location in the Czech Republic
- Coordinates: 48°54′8″N 16°14′54″E
- Country: Czech Republic
- Region: South Moravian
- District: Znojmo
- First mentioned: 1190

Area
  - Total: 18.33 km^{2} (7.08 sq mi)
- Elevation: 199 m (653 ft)

Population (2026-01-01)
  - Total: 669
  - Density: 36.5/km^{2} (94.5/sq mi)
- Time zone: UTC+1 (CET)
  - Summer (DST): UTC+2 (CEST)
- Postal code: 671 62
- Website: www.oleksovice.cz

Oleksovice (Czech pronunciation: [ˈolɛksovɪtsɛ]; German: Gross Olkowitz) is a market town in Znojmo District in the South Moravian Region of the Czech Republic. It has about 700 inhabitants.

== Geography ==
Oleksovice is located about 15 kilometres (9 mi) northeast of Znojmo and 40 km (25 mi) southwest of Brno. It lies in the Dyje–Svratka Valley. The highest point is at 270 m (886 ft) above sea level.

== History ==
The first written mention of Oleksovice is in the foundation deed of Louka Monastery from 1190. From 1190 until the abolishment of the monastery in 1784, the settlement was owned by the monastery. In 1336, Oleksovice was promoted to a market town by King John of Bohemia.

== Demographics ==
Historical population

Year	Pop.	±%
1869	1,013	—
1880	1,065	+5.1%
1890	1,081	+1.5%
1900	1,103	+2.0%
1910	1,177	+6.7%

Year	Pop.	±%
1921	1,276	+8.4%
1930	1,277	+0.1%
1950	734	−42.5%
1961	830	+13.1%
1970	798	−3.9%

Year	Pop.	±%
1980	664	−16.8%
1991	634	−4.5%
2001	696	+9.8%
2011	673	−3.3%
2021	637	−5.3%

Source: Censuses

== Economy ==
Oleksovice is known for viticulture. It lies in the Znojemská wine subregion. There are about 42 ha (100 acres) of vineyards.

== Transport ==
The I/53 road from Znojmo to Pohořelice runs along the southern municipal border.

== Sights ==
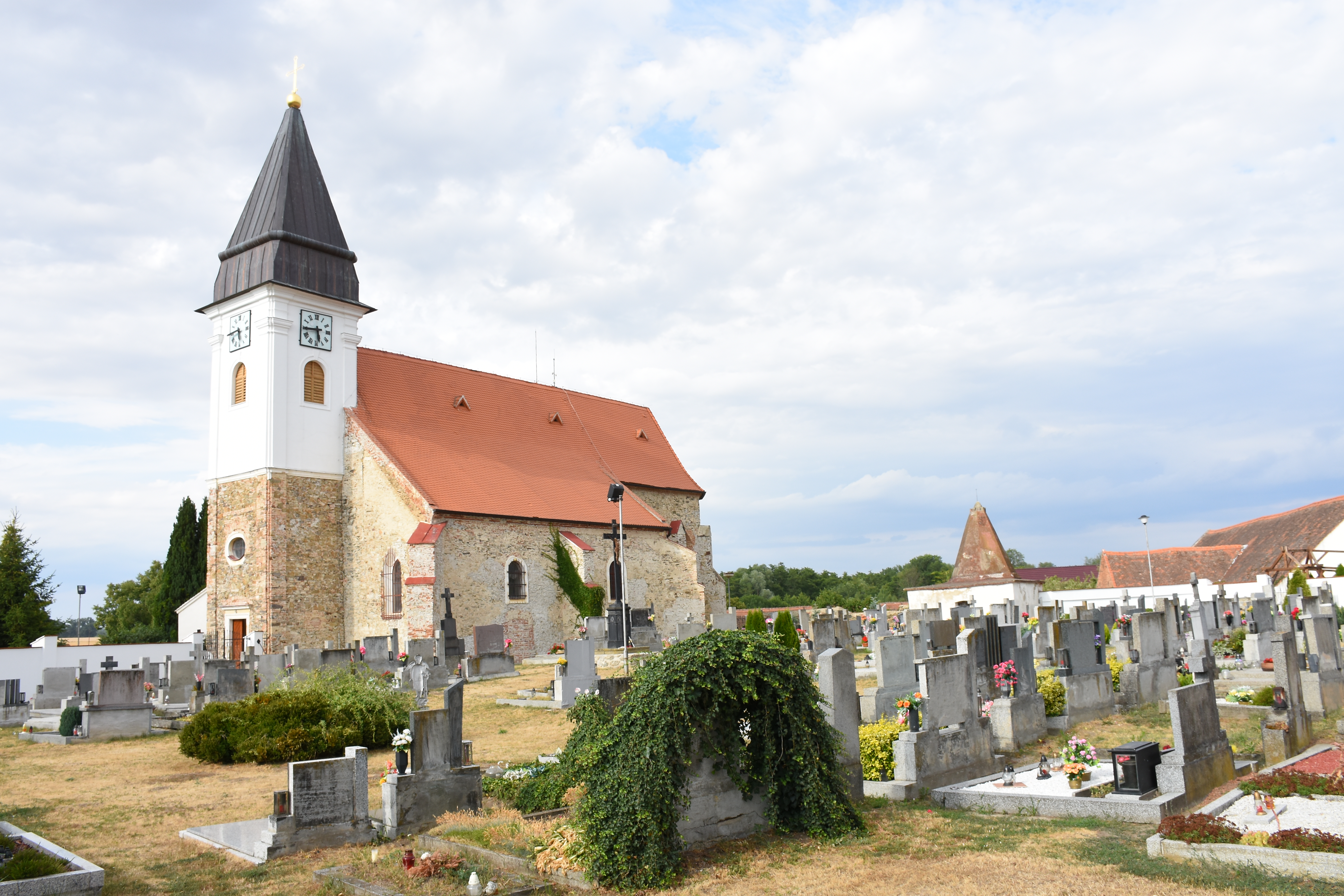
Church of the Assumption of the Virgin Mary

The main landmark of Oleksovice is the Church of the Assumption of the Virgin Mary. It has a Gothic core from the second half of the 13th century. Around 1500 and 1576, it was rebuilt to its present form. Next to the church is a charnel house.
