= Gornje Livade =

Gornje Livade may refer to:

- Gornje Livade, Novi Sad, a quarter of the city of Novi Sad, Serbia
- Gornje Livade, Banat, a small geographical area in south-eastern Banat, Serbia
