= Berthold Feiwel =

Austrian-Jewish activist and poet (1875–1937)

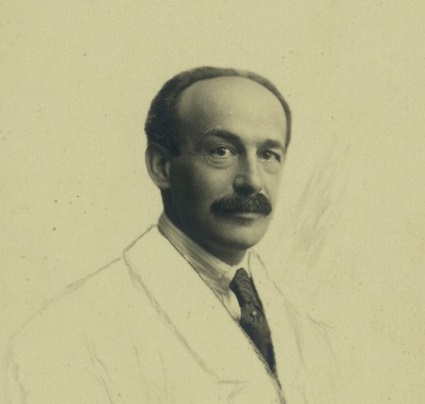
- Born: 15 August 1875; Pohořelice, Austria-Hungary
- Died: 29 December 1937 (aged 62); Jerusalem, Mandatory Palestine
- Occupations: Writer, translator, journalist, Zionist politician

Berthold Feiwel (15 August 1875 – 29 December 1937) was an Austrian-Jewish writer, translator, journalist and Zionist politician.

== Life ==
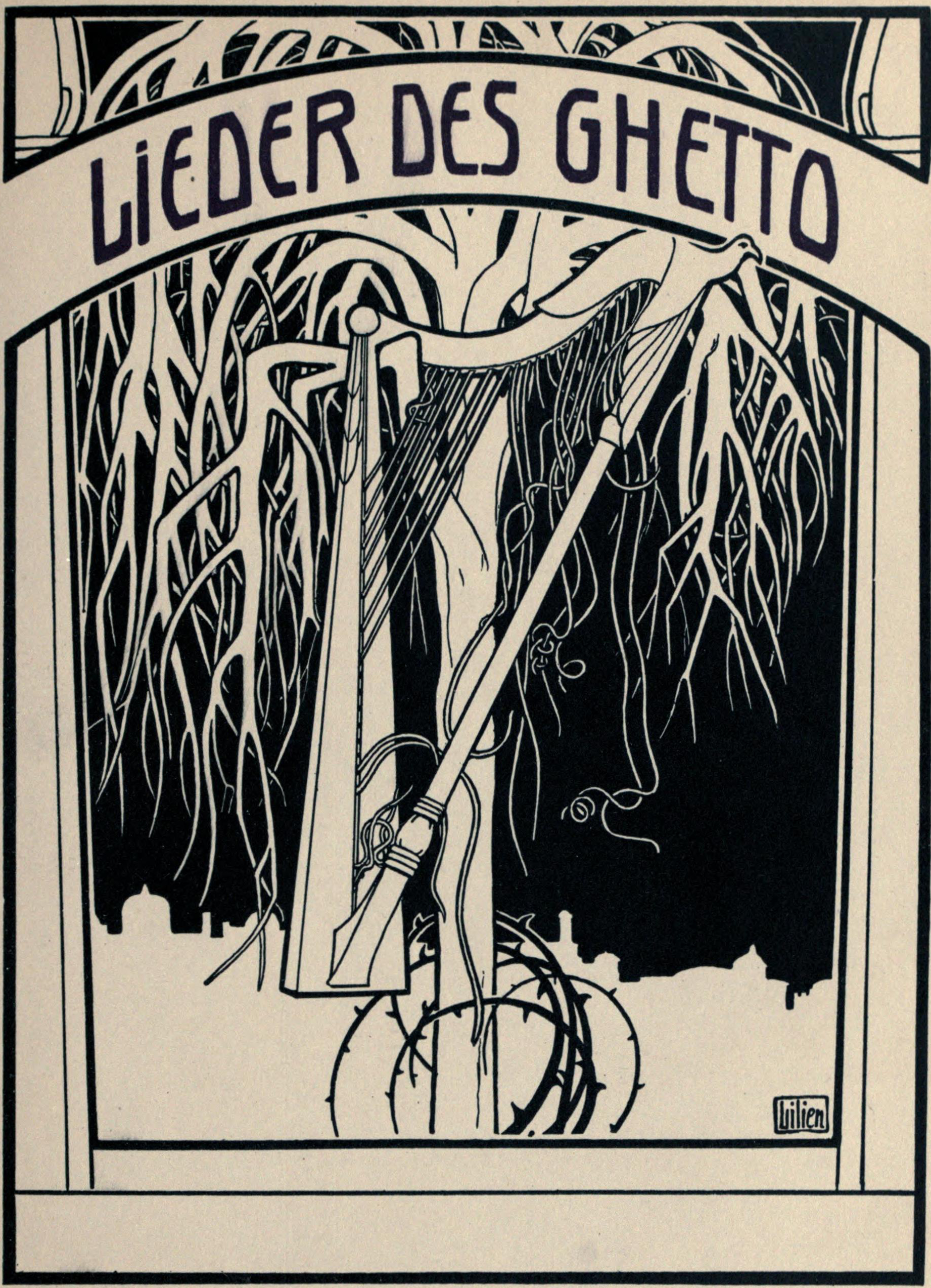
E. M. Lilien's illustrations for Feiwel's translation of Morris Rosenfeld's Songs of the Ghetto

Berthold Feiwel, son of Josef and Charlotte (née Schnabel) Feiwel, attended school in Brno and studied law and economics at the universities of Vienna and Zurich from 1893 to 1897. He also established the Jewish Academic Association Veritas.

On his 50th birthday, the Vienna Morning Newspaper described Feiwel as “A modest man who always focuses on the cause to which he has dedicated his life’s work, he has consistently diverted the attention of the Zionist public from his personal contribution to Zionist successes.”

== Literature ==
- Susanne Blumesberger, Michael Doppelhofer, Gabriele Mauthe: Handbook of Austrian Authors of Jewish Origin 18th to 20th Century. Volume 1: A–I. Edited by the Austrian National Library. Saur, Munich 2002, ISBN 3-598-11545-8, pp. 307f.
- Feiwel, Berthold. In: Lexicon of German-Jewish Authors. Volume 7: Feis–Frey. Edited by the Bibliographia Judaica Archive. Saur, Munich 1999, ISBN 3-598-22687-X, pp. 18–23.
- Salomon Wininger: Great Jewish National Biography. Volume 2. Czernowitz 1927, pp. 231f.
