= Malešovice =

- Municipality
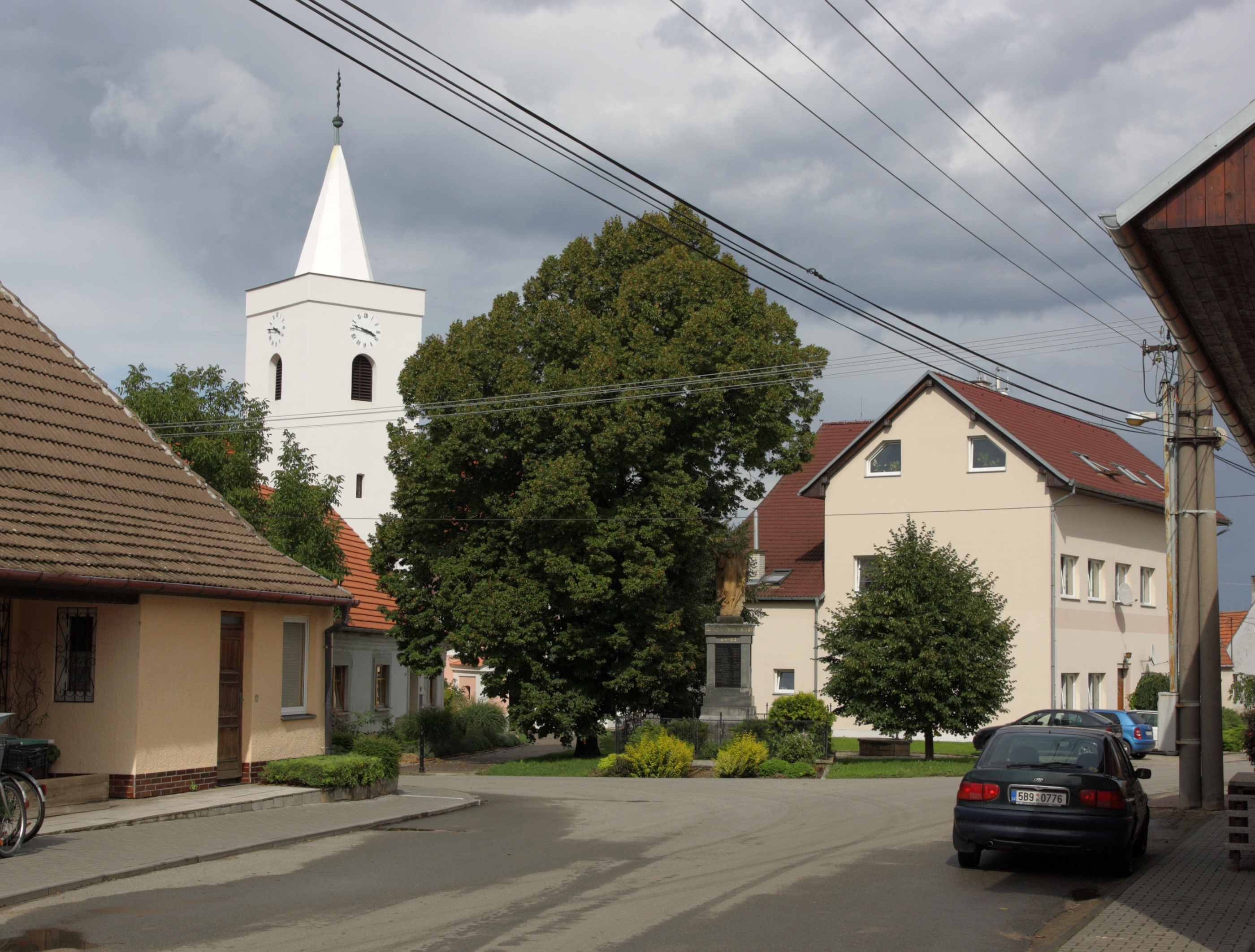
- Centre of Malešovice

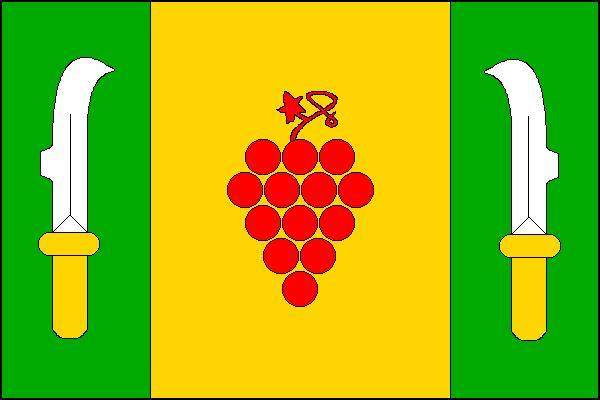
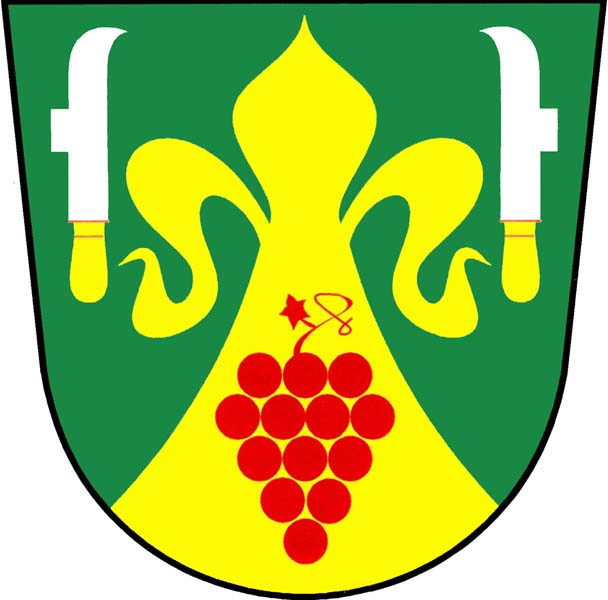
- Flag Coat of arms

- Location in the Czech Republic
- Coordinates: 49°1′25″N 16°30′5″E
- Country: Czech Republic
- Region: South Moravian
- District: Brno-Country
- First mentioned: 1104

Area
  - Total: 9.20 km^{2} (3.55 sq mi)
- Elevation: 187 m (614 ft)

Population (2026-01-01)
  - Total: 873
  - Density: 94.9/km^{2} (246/sq mi)
- Time zone: UTC+1 (CET)
  - Summer (DST): UTC+2 (CEST)
- Postal code: 664 65
- Website: www.malesovice.cz

Malešovice (German: Malspitz) is a municipality and village in Brno-Country District in the South Moravian Region of the Czech Republic. It has about 900 inhabitants.

Malešovice lies approximately 22 kilometres (14 mi) south-west of Brno and 191 km (119 mi) south-east of Prague.

== Demographics ==
Historical population
Year	Pop.	±%
1869	473	—
1880	477	+0.8%
1890	584	+22.4%
1900	565	−3.3%
1910	575	+1.8%
1921	601	+4.5%
1930	515	−14.3%
1950	466	−9.5%
1961	430	−7.7%
1970	431	+0.2%
1980	409	−5.1%
1991	366	−10.5%
2001	365	−0.3%
2011	502	+37.5%
2021	725	+44.4%
Source: Censuses
