= Pohořelice (Zlín District) =

- Municipality
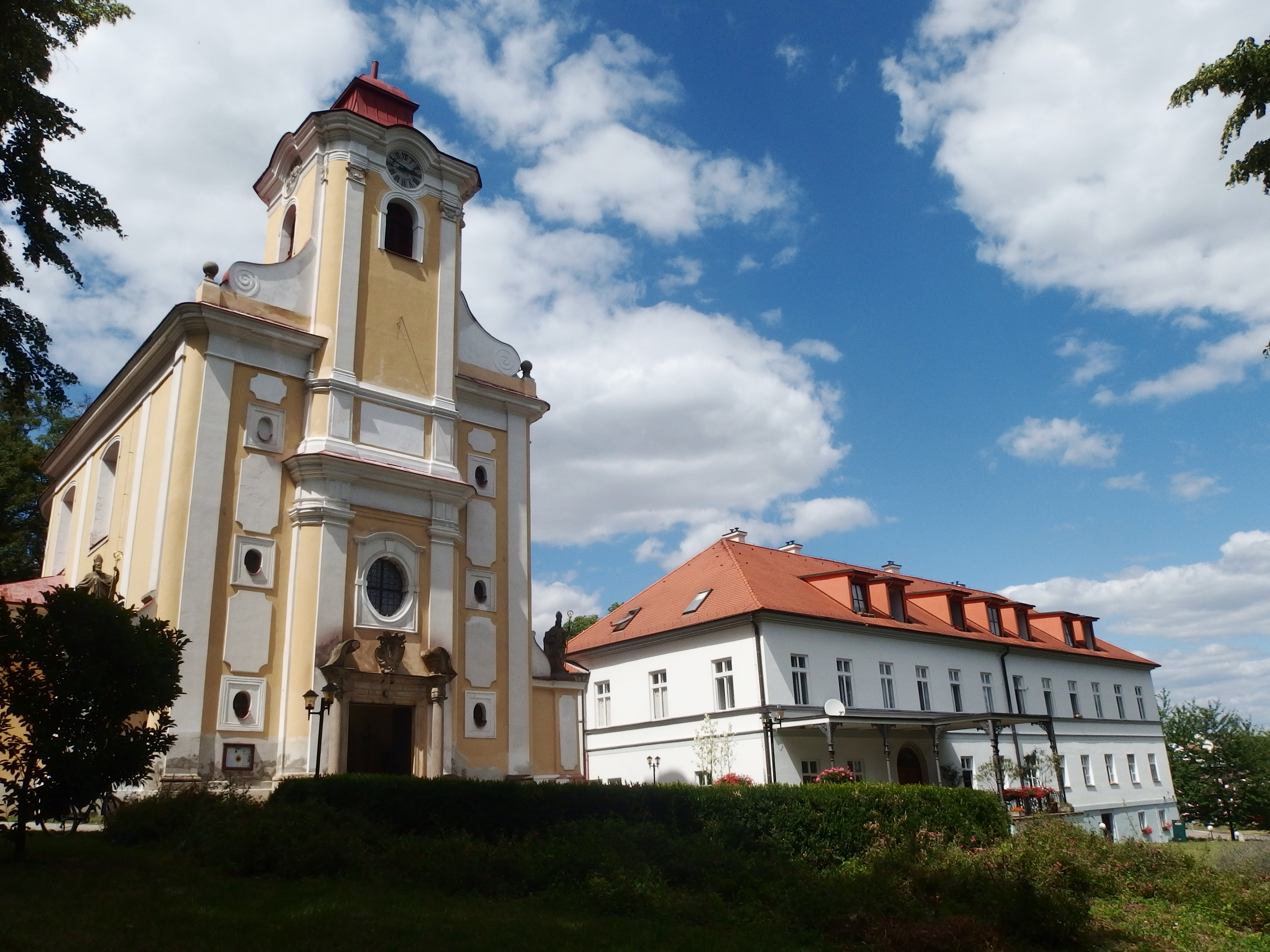
- Church of Saint John of Nepomuk and Pohořelice Castle

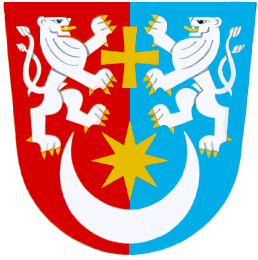
- Flag Coat of arms

- Location in the Czech Republic
- Coordinates: 49°10′36″N 17°32′16″E
- Country: Czech Republic
- Region: Zlín
- District: Zlín
- First mentioned: 1255

Area
  - Total: 5.88 km^{2} (2.27 sq mi)
- Elevation: 252 m (827 ft)

Population (2026-01-01)
  - Total: 935
  - Density: 159/km^{2} (412/sq mi)
- Time zone: UTC+1 (CET)
  - Summer (DST): UTC+2 (CEST)
- Postal code: 763 61
- Website: www.obecpohorelice.cz

Pohořelice is a municipality and village in Zlín District in the Zlín Region of the Czech Republic. It has about 900 inhabitants.

Pohořelice lies approximately 11 kilometres (7 mi) south-west of Zlín and 247 km (153 mi) south-east of Prague.

== Demographics ==
Historical population
| Year | Pop. | ±% |
|---|---|---|
| 1869 | 544 | — |
| 1880 | 654 | +20.2% |
| 1890 | 627 | −4.1% |
| 1900 | 672 | +7.2% |
| 1910 | 670 | −0.3% |
| 1921 | 715 | +6.7% |
| 1930 | 765 | +7.0% |
| 1950 | 841 | +9.9% |
| 1961 | 920 | +9.4% |
| 1970 | 931 | +1.2% |
| 1980 | 803 | −13.7% |
| 1991 | 765 | −4.7% |
| 2001 | 796 | +4.1% |
| 2011 | 834 | +4.8% |
| 2021 | 859 | +3.0% |
Source: Censuses
