= Odrovice =

- Municipality
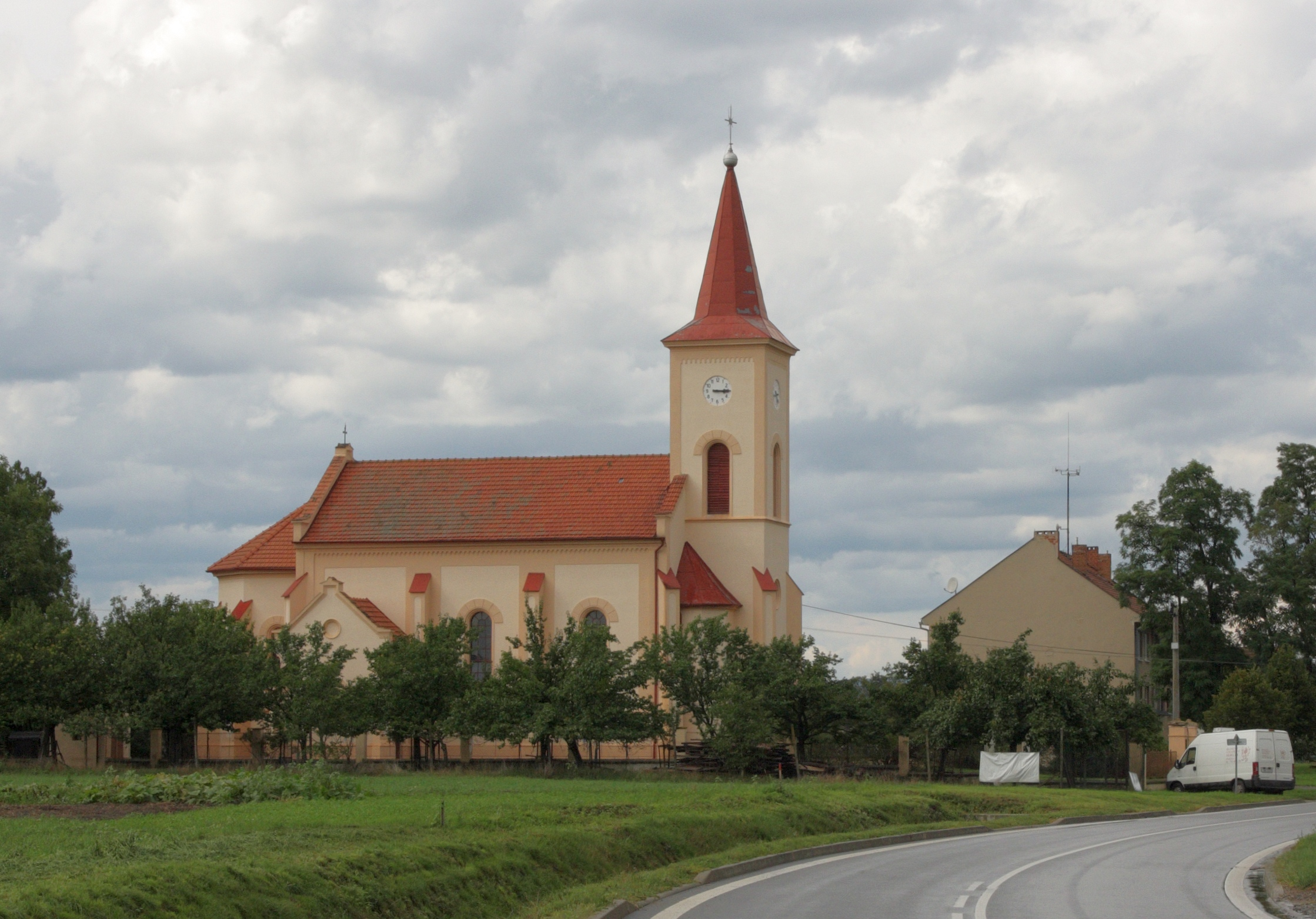
- Church of the Virgin Mary of Help

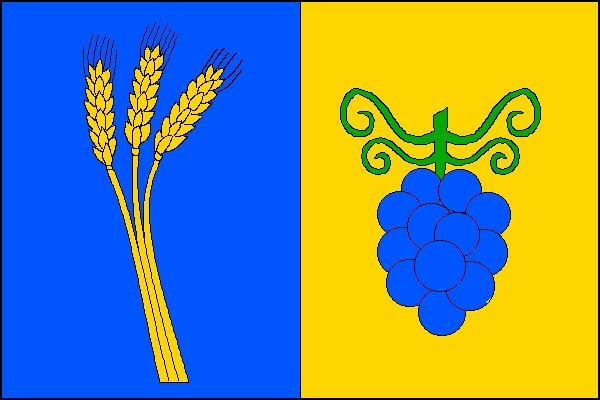
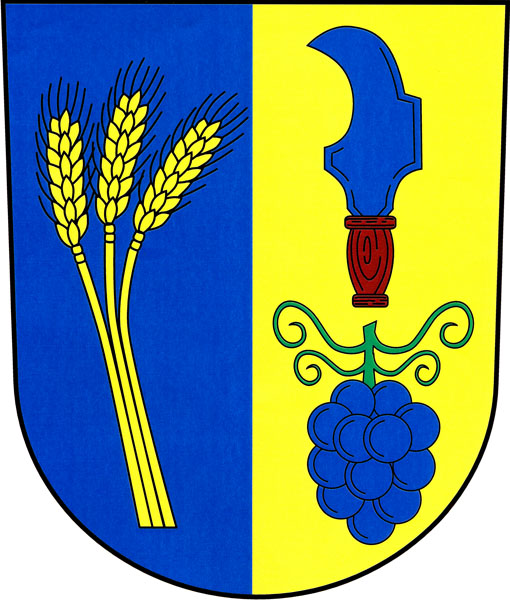
- Flag Coat of arms

- Location in the Czech Republic
- Coordinates: 49°0′39″N 16°30′32″E
- Country: Czech Republic
- Region: South Moravian
- District: Brno-Country
- First mentioned: 1190

Area
  - Total: 4.80 km^{2} (1.85 sq mi)
- Elevation: 186 m (610 ft)

Population (2026-01-01)
  - Total: 288
  - Density: 60.0/km^{2} (155/sq mi)
- Time zone: UTC+1 (CET)
  - Summer (DST): UTC+2 (CEST)
- Postal code: 664 64
- Website: www.odrovice.cz

Odrovice is a municipality and village in Brno-Country District in the South Moravian Region of the Czech Republic. It has about 300 inhabitants.

Odrovice lies approximately 24 kilometres (15 mi) south of Brno and 192 km (119 mi) south-east of Prague.

== Demographics ==
Historical population
Year	Pop.	±%
1869	277	—
1880	324	+17.0%
1890	305	−5.9%
1900	310	+1.6%
1910	326	+5.2%
1921	311	−4.6%
1930	271	−12.9%
1950	256	−5.5%
1961	248	−3.1%
1970	225	−9.3%
1980	203	−9.8%
1991	169	−16.7%
2001	186	+10.1%
2011	197	+5.9%
2021	248	+25.9%
Source: Censuses
