= Viničné Šumice =

- Municipality
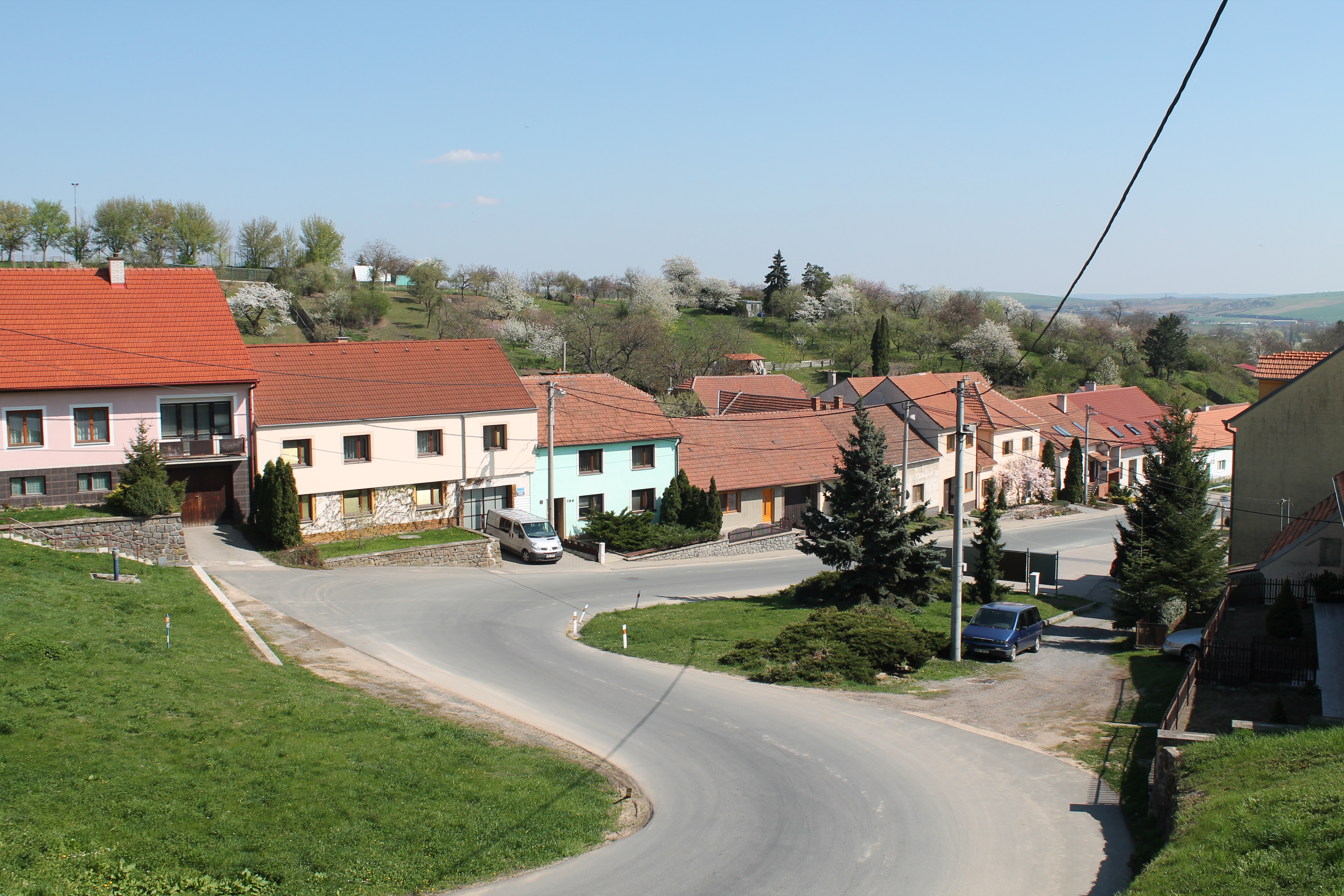
- Common in Viničné Šumice

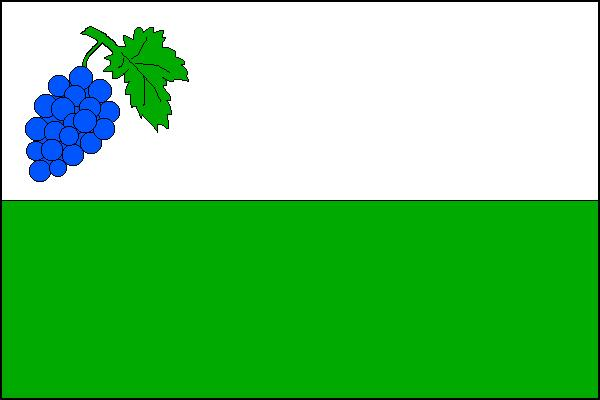
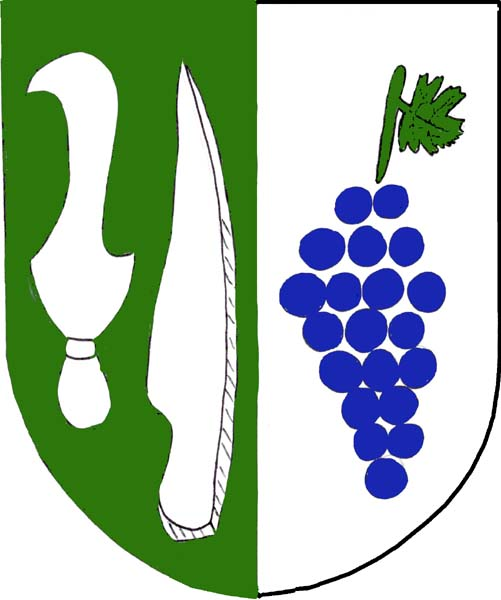
- Flag Coat of arms

- Location in the Czech Republic
- Coordinates: 49°12′49″N 16°49′32″E
- Country: Czech Republic
- Region: South Moravian
- District: Brno-Country
- First mentioned: 1350

Area
  - Total: 4.75 km^{2} (1.83 sq mi)
- Elevation: 295 m (968 ft)

Population (2026-01-01)
  - Total: 1,381
  - Density: 291/km^{2} (753/sq mi)
- Time zone: UTC+1 (CET)
  - Summer (DST): UTC+2 (CEST)
- Postal code: 664 06
- Website: www.vinicne-sumice.cz

Viničné Šumice is a municipality and village in Brno-Country District in the South Moravian Region of the Czech Republic. It has about 1,400 inhabitants.

== Geography ==
Viničné Šumice is located about 12 kilometres (7 mi) east of Brno. It lies on the border between the Vyškov Gate and Drahany Highlands. The highest point is at 387 m (1,270 ft) above sea level.

== History ==
The first written mention of Šumice is from 1350. The village was part of the Vildenberk estate, owned by Jobst of Moravia from 1371, but the Vildenberk Castle was abandoned before 1402. Jobst donated the village to Petr of Kravaře in 1402. In 1417, Šumice acquired the vineyard right. The village then often changed owners, which lasted until 1637. From 1637 to 1920, Šumice was a property of the Liechtenstein family.

In 1925, the name of the municipality was changed to Viničné Šumice (from vinice, meaning 'vineyard').

== Demographics ==
Historical population

| Year | Pop. | ±% |
|---|---|---|
| 1869 | 772 | — |
| 1880 | 855 | +10.8% |
| 1890 | 786 | −8.1% |
| 1900 | 900 | +14.5% |
| 1910 | 954 | +6.0% |

| Year | Pop. | ±% |
|---|---|---|
| 1921 | 937 | −1.8% |
| 1930 | 969 | +3.4% |
| 1950 | 1,151 | +18.8% |
| 1961 | 1,262 | +9.6% |
| 1970 | 1,196 | −5.2% |

| Year | Pop. | ±% |
|---|---|---|
| 1980 | 1,107 | −7.4% |
| 1991 | 1,023 | −7.6% |
| 2001 | 1,018 | −0.5% |
| 2011 | 1,247 | +22.5% |
| 2021 | 1,357 | +8.8% |

Source: Censuses

== Economy ==
Viničné Šumice is the northernmost wine municipality in Moravia.

== Transport ==
There are no railways or major roads passing through the municipality.

== Sights ==
The only protected cultural monument in the municipality is a stone cross from the turn of the 18th and 19th centuries, located in the centre of the village. Next to the cross is a belfry.
