= Cvrčovice (Kladno District) =

- Municipality
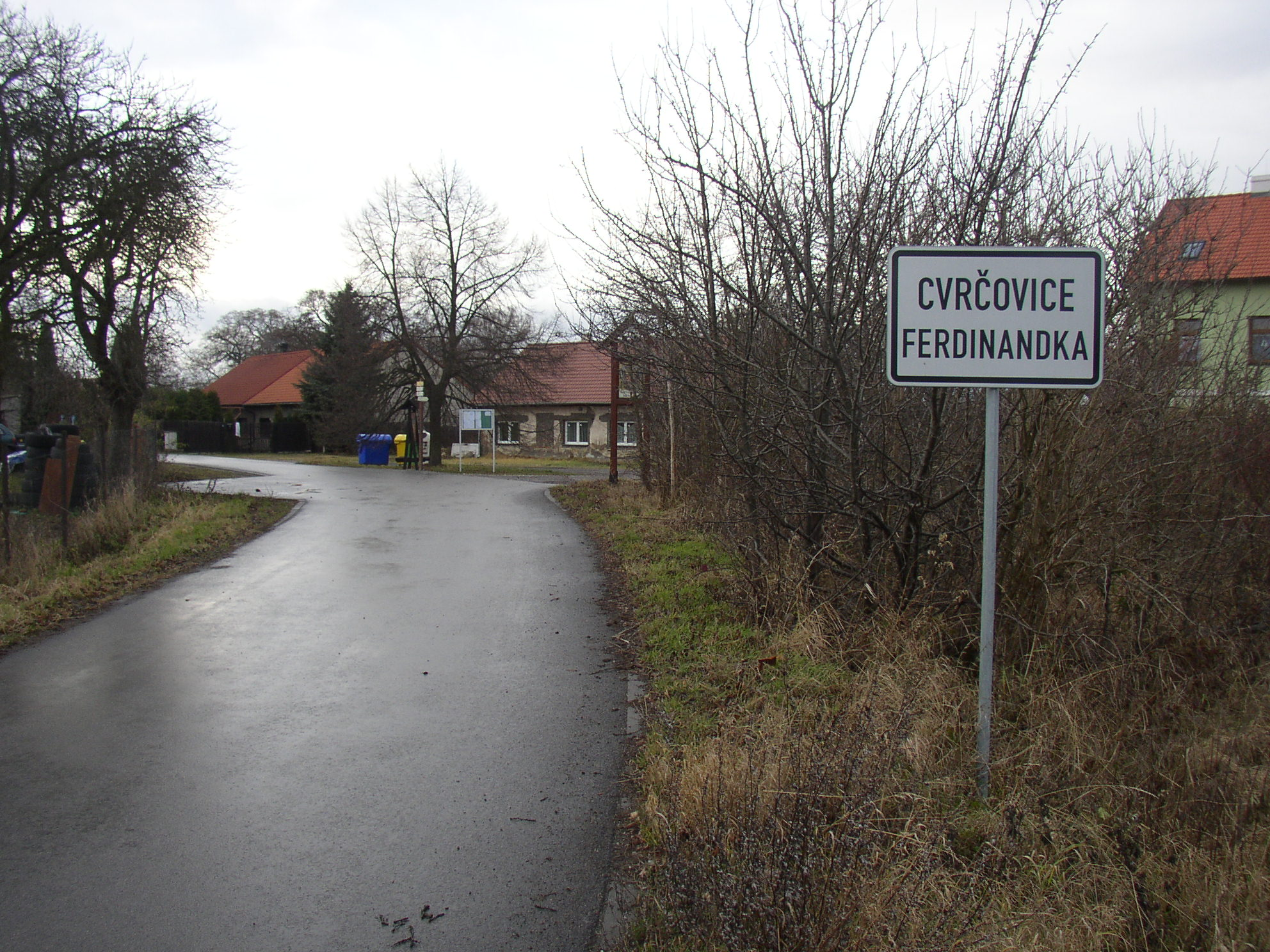
- Ferdinandka, local part of Cvrčovice

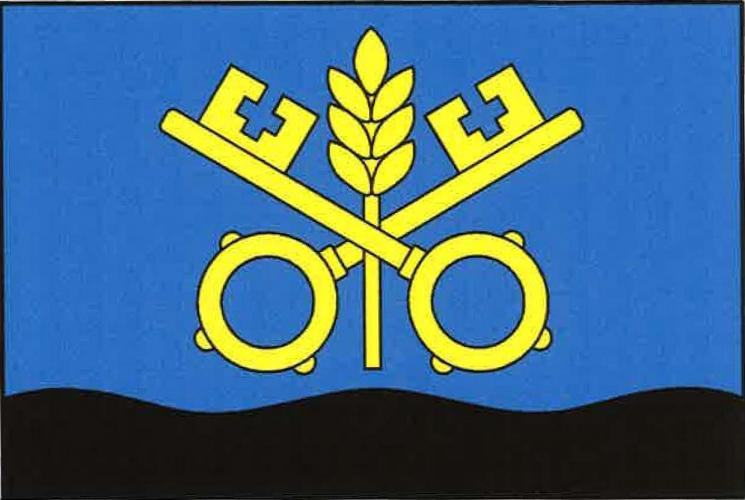
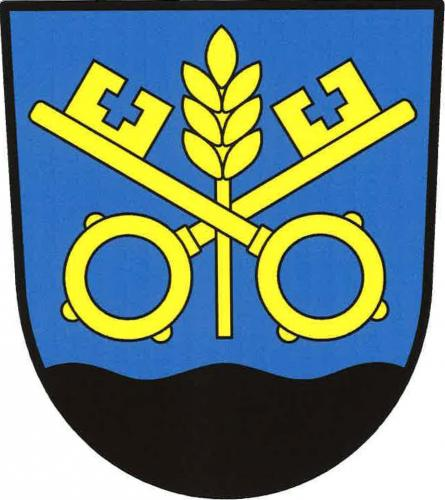
- Flag Coat of arms

- Location in the Czech Republic
- Coordinates: 50°10′48″N 14°9′18″E
- Country: Czech Republic
- Region: Central Bohemian
- District: Kladno
- First mentioned: 1316

Area
  - Total: 2.49 km^{2} (0.96 sq mi)
- Elevation: 329 m (1,079 ft)

Population (2026-01-01)
  - Total: 793
  - Density: 318/km^{2} (825/sq mi)
- Time zone: UTC+1 (CET)
  - Summer (DST): UTC+2 (CEST)
- Postal code: 273 41
- Website: www.cvrcovice.eu

Cvrčovice is a municipality and village in Kladno District in the Central Bohemian Region of the Czech Republic. It has about 800 inhabitants.

== Demographics ==
Historical population
Year	Pop.	±%
1869	486	—
1880	1,036	+113.2%
1890	1,216	+17.4%
1900	1,250	+2.8%
1910	1,396	+11.7%
1921	1,292	−7.4%
1930	1,143	−11.5%
1950	903	−21.0%
1961	851	−5.8%
1970	767	−9.9%
1980	691	−9.9%
1991	566	−18.1%
2001	567	+0.2%
2011	705	+24.3%
2021	784	+11.2%
Source: Censuses
