= Cvrčovice (Brno-Country District) =

- Municipality
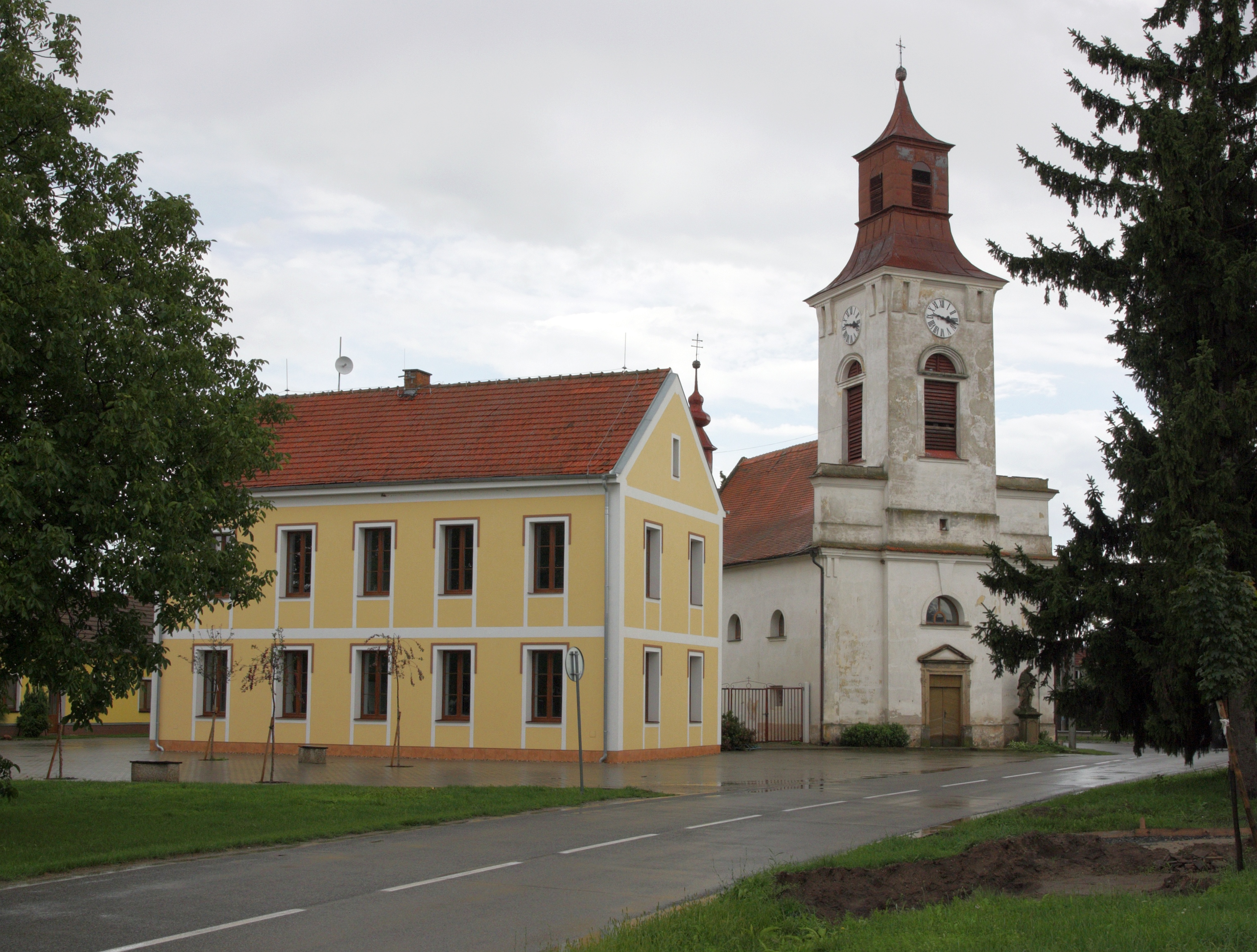
- Centre of Cvrčovice with the Church of Saint James the Great

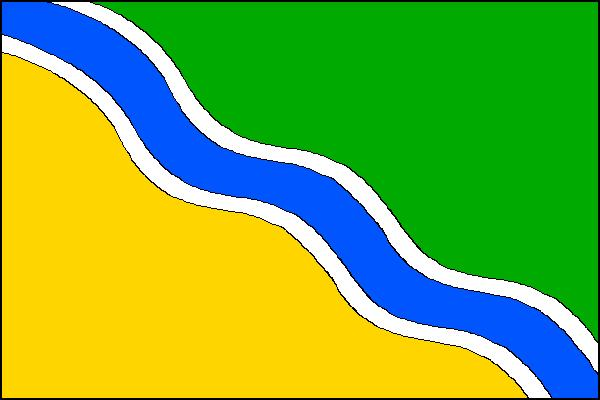
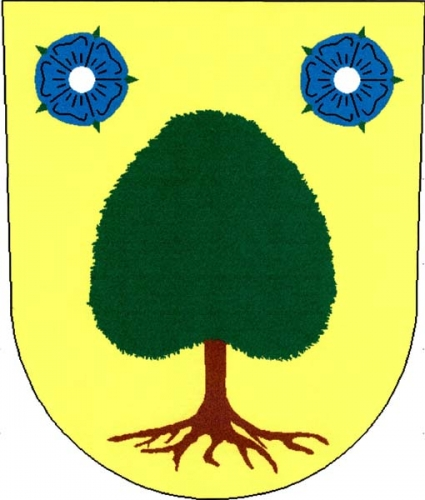
- Flag Coat of arms

- Location in the Czech Republic
- Coordinates: 48°59′37″N 16°30′52″E
- Country: Czech Republic
- Region: South Moravian
- District: Brno-Country
- First mentioned: 1276

Area
  - Total: 9.29 km^{2} (3.59 sq mi)
- Elevation: 182 m (597 ft)

Population (2026-01-01)
  - Total: 676
  - Density: 72.8/km^{2} (188/sq mi)
- Time zone: UTC+1 (CET)
  - Summer (DST): UTC+2 (CEST)
- Postal code: 691 23
- Website: cvrcovice.cz

Cvrčovice is a municipality and village in Brno-Country District in the South Moravian Region of the Czech Republic. It has about 700 inhabitants.

Cvrčovice lies approximately 25 kilometres (16 mi) south of Brno and 194 km (121 mi) south-east of Prague.

== Demographics ==
Historical population
Year	Pop.	±%
1869	570	—
1880	709	+24.4%
1890	717	+1.1%
1900	727	+1.4%
1910	733	+0.8%
1921	716	−2.3%
1930	725	+1.3%
1950	591	−18.5%
1961	653	+10.5%
1970	567	−13.2%
1980	571	+0.7%
1991	565	−1.1%
2001	557	−1.4%
2011	606	+8.8%
2021	645	+6.4%
Source: Censuses
