= Šumice (Brno-Country District) =

- Municipality
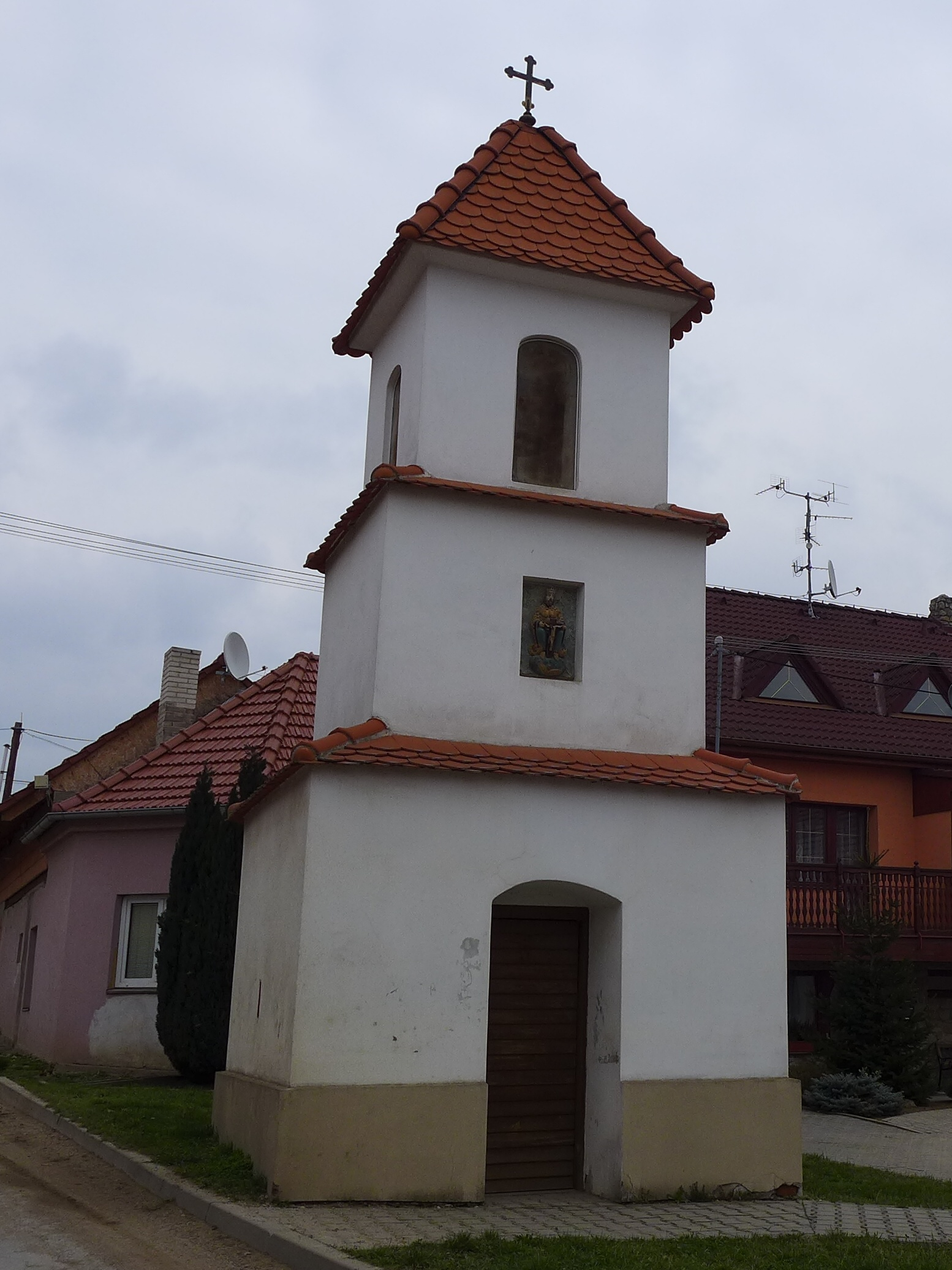
- Belfry

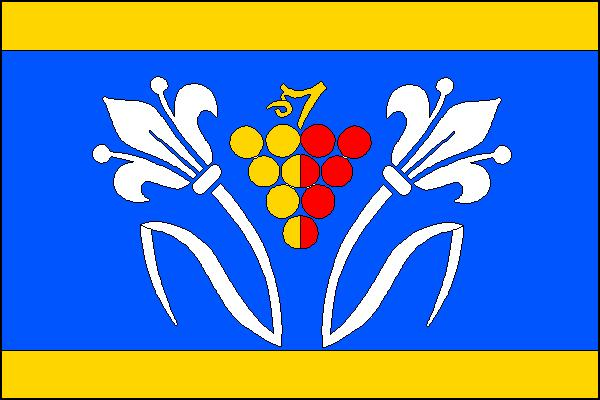
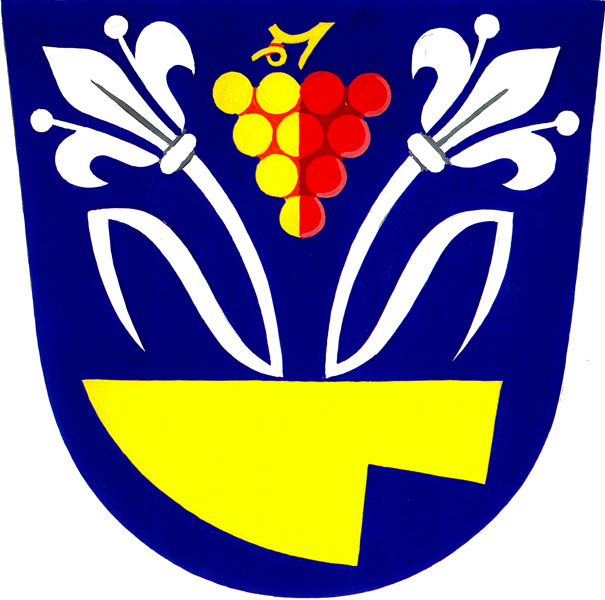
- Flag Coat of arms

- Location in the Czech Republic
- Coordinates: 48°59′32″N 16°26′15″E
- Country: Czech Republic
- Region: South Moravian
- District: Brno-Country
- First mentioned: 1365

Area
  - Total: 8.62 km^{2} (3.33 sq mi)
- Elevation: 207 m (679 ft)

Population (2026-01-01)
  - Total: 325
  - Density: 37.7/km^{2} (97.7/sq mi)
- Time zone: UTC+1 (CET)
  - Summer (DST): UTC+2 (CEST)
- Postal code: 671 75
- Website: www.sumice.eu

Šumice is a municipality and village in Brno-Country District in the South Moravian Region of the Czech Republic. It has about 300 inhabitants.

Šumice lies approximately 89 kilometres (55 mi) east of Brno and 145 km (90 mi) east of Prague.

== Demographics ==
Historical population
Year	Pop.	±%
1869	437	—
1880	491	+12.4%
1890	553	+12.6%
1900	530	−4.2%
1910	531	+0.2%
1921	520	−2.1%
1930	537	+3.3%
1950	344	−35.9%
1961	340	−1.2%
1970	307	−9.7%
1980	285	−7.2%
1991	261	−8.4%
2001	218	−16.5%
2011	248	+13.8%
2021	281	+13.3%
Source: Censuses
