= Gornje Livade, Novi Sad =

Coordinates: 45.2993°N 19.7964°E

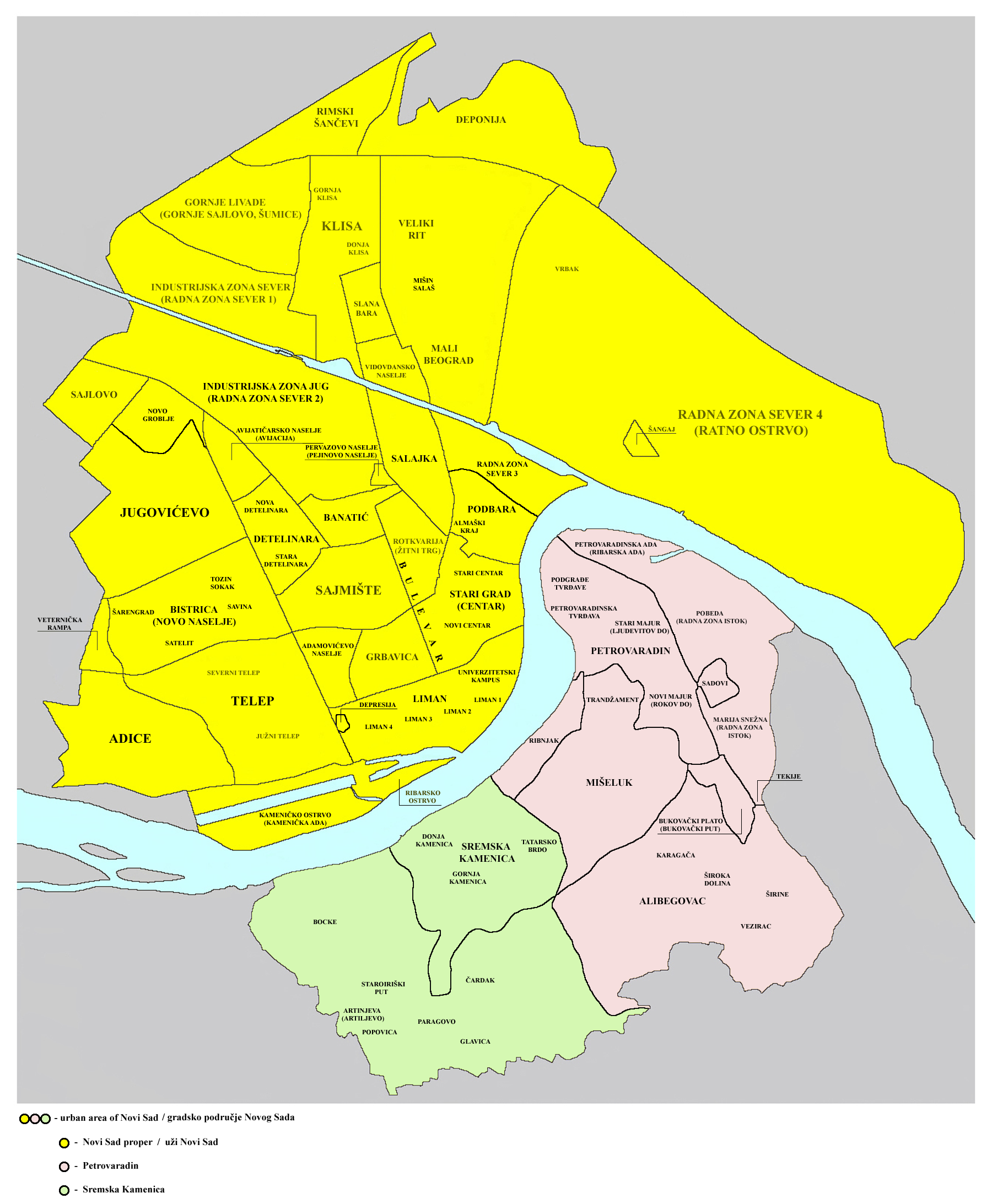
Map of the urban area of Novi Sad with city quarters, showing the location of Klisanski breg

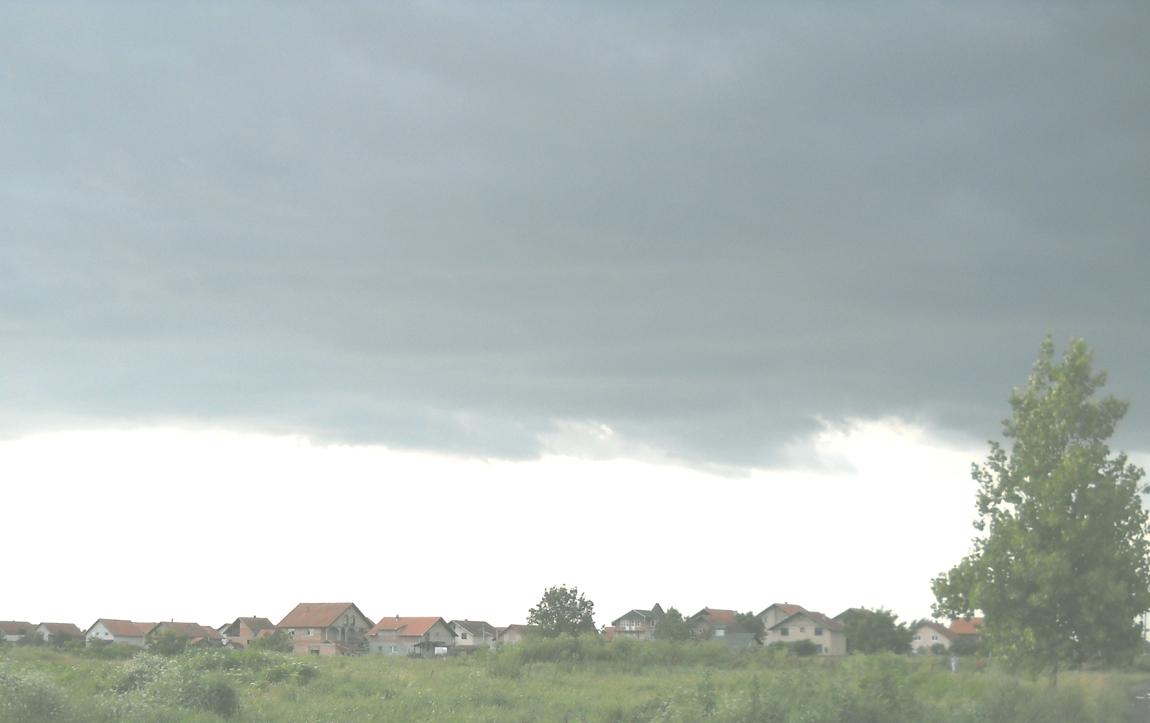
View of Klisanski breg

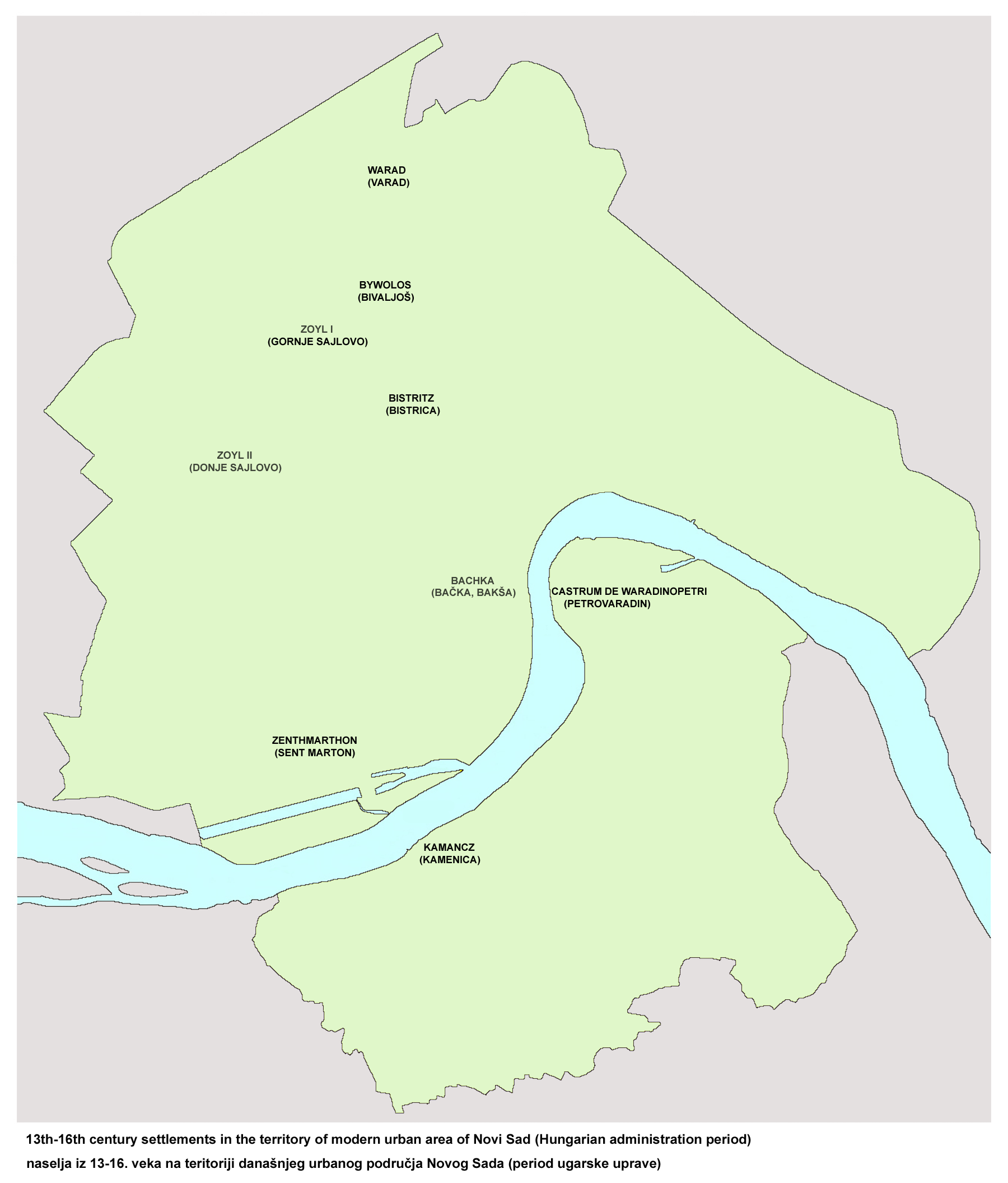
Location of medieval settlement of Gornje Sajlovo (13th-16th century)

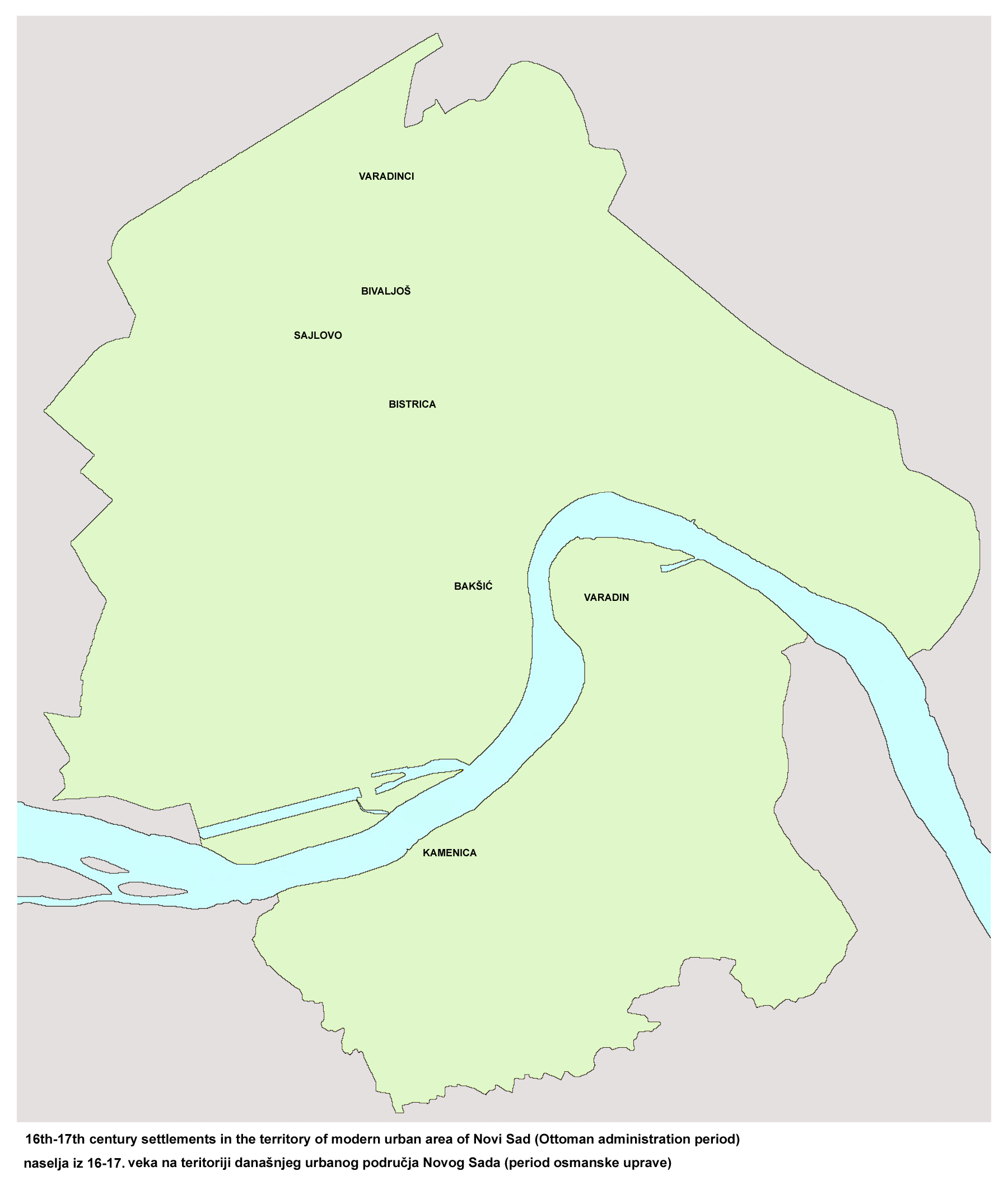
Location of settlement of Sajlovo during Ottoman administration (16th-17th century)

Klisanski breg (Serbian: Klisanski breg), also known as Gornje Sajlovo (Serbian: Горње Сајлово) and Šumice (Serbian: Шумице), is an urban neighborhood of the city of Novi Sad, Serbia.

== History ==
In the past, this area was known as Gornje Sajlovo. In 1237, two villages named Sajlovo (Gornje Sajlovo and Donje Sajlovo) were mentioned to exist in this area. The original name of these settlements was Isailovo. The settlements were named after monk Isaija from a nearby monastery that existed in the 12th century, east of Rumenka. The name Sajlovo/Isailovo is of Slavic origin, which indicates that these settlements were initially inhabited by Slavs.

In the 16th century, the village was destroyed and later Ottoman defters mention Gornje Sajlovo as a heath that was inhabited by people, but not in the form of a settlement. In 1554, an Ottoman defter recorded that Sajlovo had three houses that paid taxes, while by 1570, the number of houses that paid taxes had increased to seven. However, since Ottoman defters did not record houses that were liberated from paying taxes, these records do not show the correct number of inhabitants in the area.

== Borders ==
The eastern border of Klisanski breg is ulica Profesora Grčića (Profesora Grčića Street), the northern border is E75 international road, the north-western border is a north-western city limit of Novi Sad, while the southern border towards industrial zone is not entirely clear.

== Neighbouring city quarters ==
The neighbouring city quarters are: Klisa in the east, Rimski Šančevi in the north, and Industrijska Zona Sever (northern industrial zone) in the south.

== See also ==
- Neighborhoods of Novi Sad
