= Pohořelice =

- Town
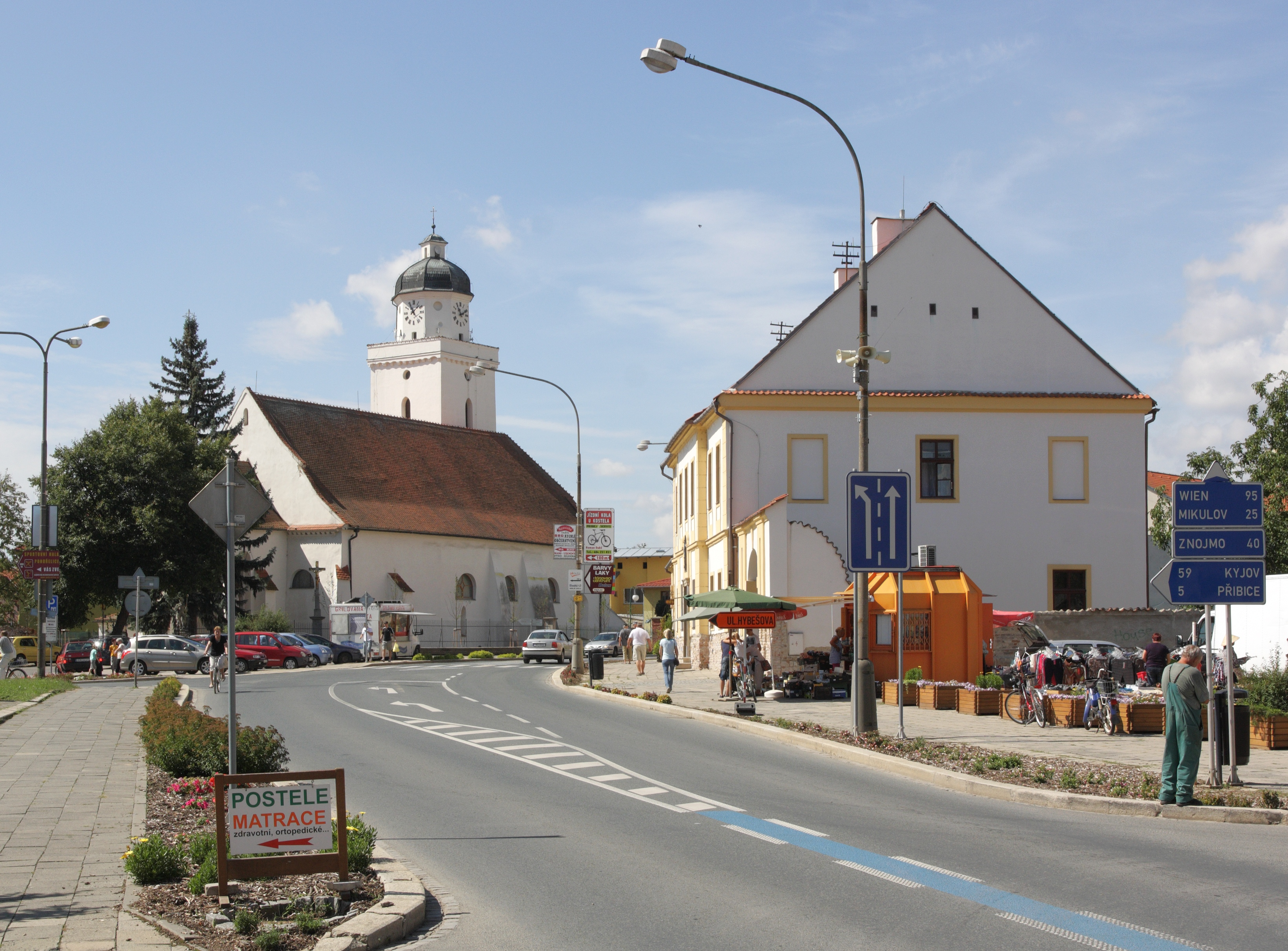
- Town square

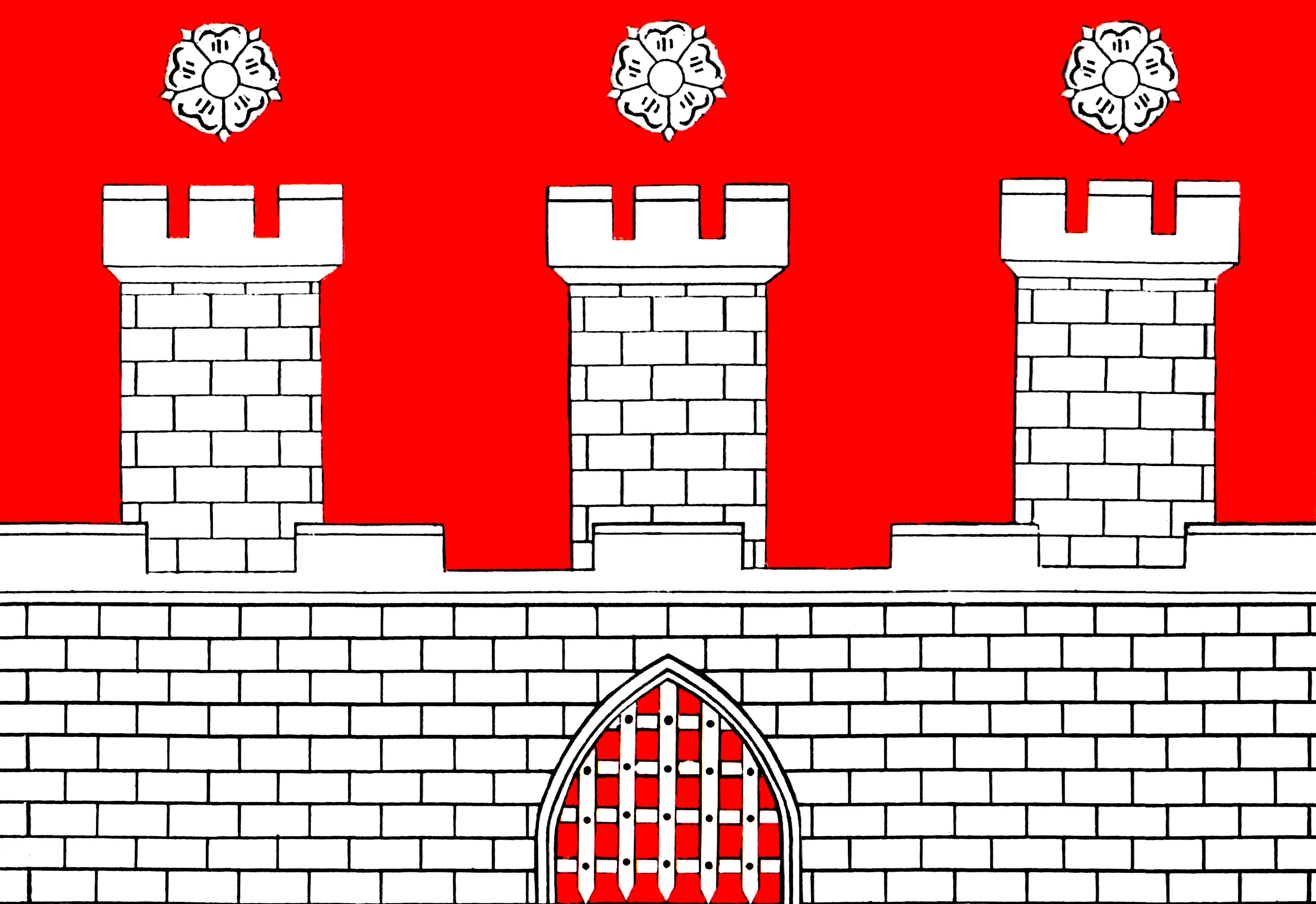
- Flag Coat of arms

- Location in the Czech Republic
- Coordinates: 48°58′52″N 16°31′28″E
- Country: Czech Republic
- Region: South Moravian
- District: Brno-Country
- First mentioned: 1222

Government
  - Mayor: Miroslav Novák

Area
  - Total: 43.05 km^{2} (16.62 sq mi)
- Elevation: 181 m (594 ft)

Population (2026-01-01)
  - Total: 6,299
  - Density: 146.3/km^{2} (379.0/sq mi)
- Time zone: UTC+1 (CET)
  - Summer (DST): UTC+2 (CEST)
- Postal code: 691 23
- Website: www.pohorelice.cz

Pohořelice (Czech pronunciation: [ˈpoɦor̝ɛlɪtsɛ]; German: Pohrlitz) is a town in Brno-Country District in the South Moravian Region of the Czech Republic. It has about 6,300 inhabitants. The town is located on the Jihlava River in the Dyje–Svratka Valley. The main landmark of the town is the Church of Saint James the Great.

== Administrative division ==
Pohořelice consists of three municipal parts (in brackets population according to the 2021 census):

- Pohořelice (4,628)
- Nová Ves (351)
- Smolín (282)

== Geography ==
Pohořelice is located about 23 kilometres (14 mi) south of Brno. It lies in a flat landscape in the Dyje–Svratka Valley. The Jihlava River flows through the town. There are two large fishponds in the municipal territory: Vrkoč and Starý rybník. They are among the largest ponds in Moravia. The largest Moravian pond, Novoveský rybník, is located near Nová Ves just outside the territory of Pohořelice.

== History ==
The first written mention of Pohořelice is from 1222. It was a royal town until 1512, when it was acquired by Vilém II of Pernštejn. He and his descendants focused on the economic development of the town and they began to establish ponds. Pohořelice became a centre of grain growing, viticulture and fish farming.

In the 18th century, the Pohořelice estate was owned by the Dietrichstein family. The town experienced construction development, especially thanks to the construction of the road from Brno to Vienna in 1727.

After World War II, there was an internment camp in the town for ethnic Germans, as a part of the Brno death march.

== Demographics ==
Historical population

Year	Pop.	±%
1869	3,553	—
1880	4,170	+17.4%
1890	4,372	+4.8%
1900	4,434	+1.4%
1910	4,444	+0.2%

Year	Pop.	±%
1921	4,658	+4.8%
1930	5,225	+12.2%
1950	3,534	−32.4%
1961	3,836	+8.5%
1970	4,085	+6.5%

Year	Pop.	±%
1980	4,554	+11.5%
1991	4,378	−3.9%
2001	4,362	−0.4%
2011	4,667	+7.0%
2021	5,261	+12.7%

Source: Censuses

== Economy ==
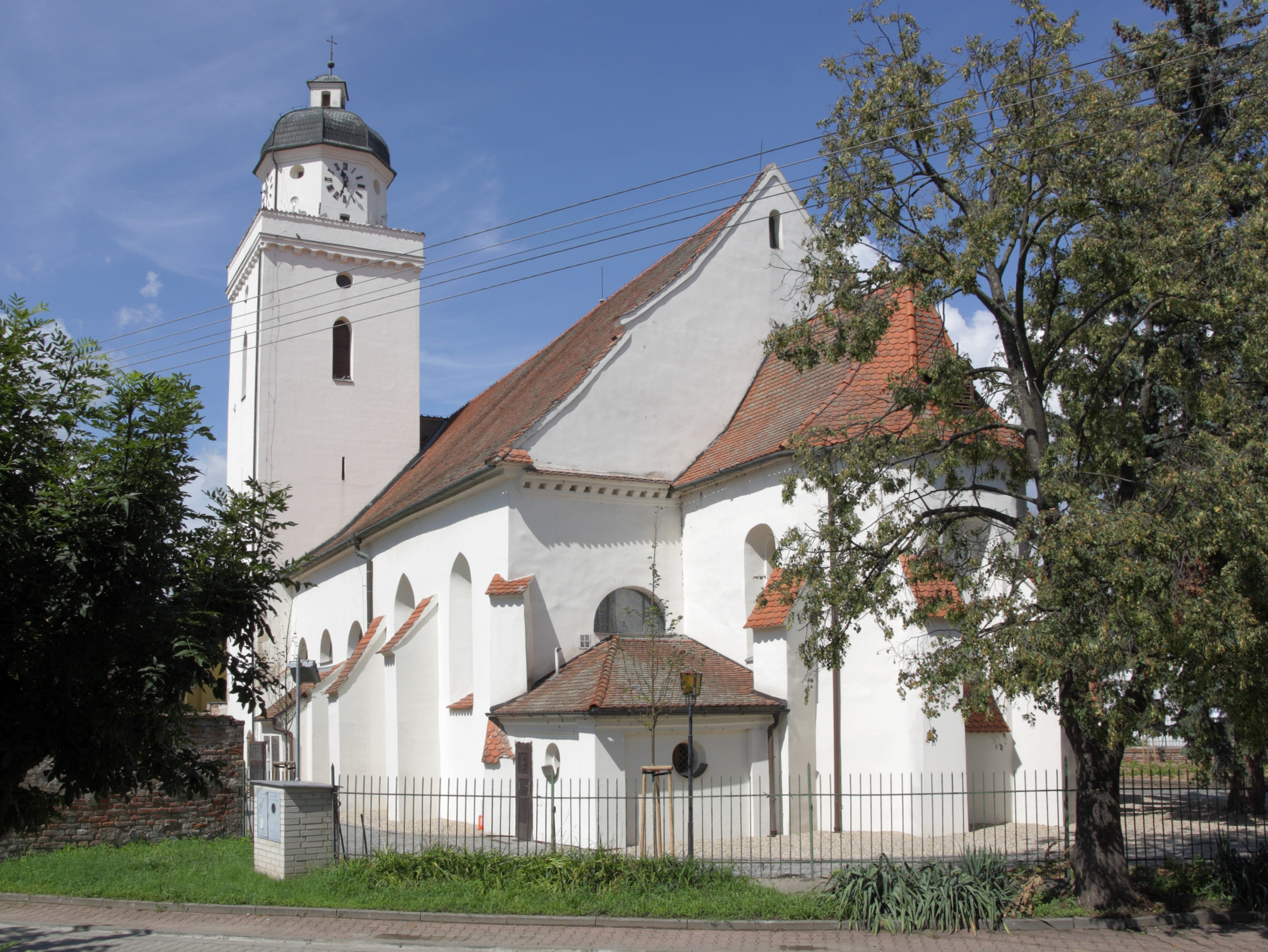
Church of Saint James the Great

Viticulture has a long tradition here. Pohořelice lies in the Mikulovská wine sub-region.

== Transport ==
The D52 motorway, which further continues as the I/52 road (part of the European route E461 from Brno to the Czech–Austrian border in Mikulov), runs through the town.

== Sights ==
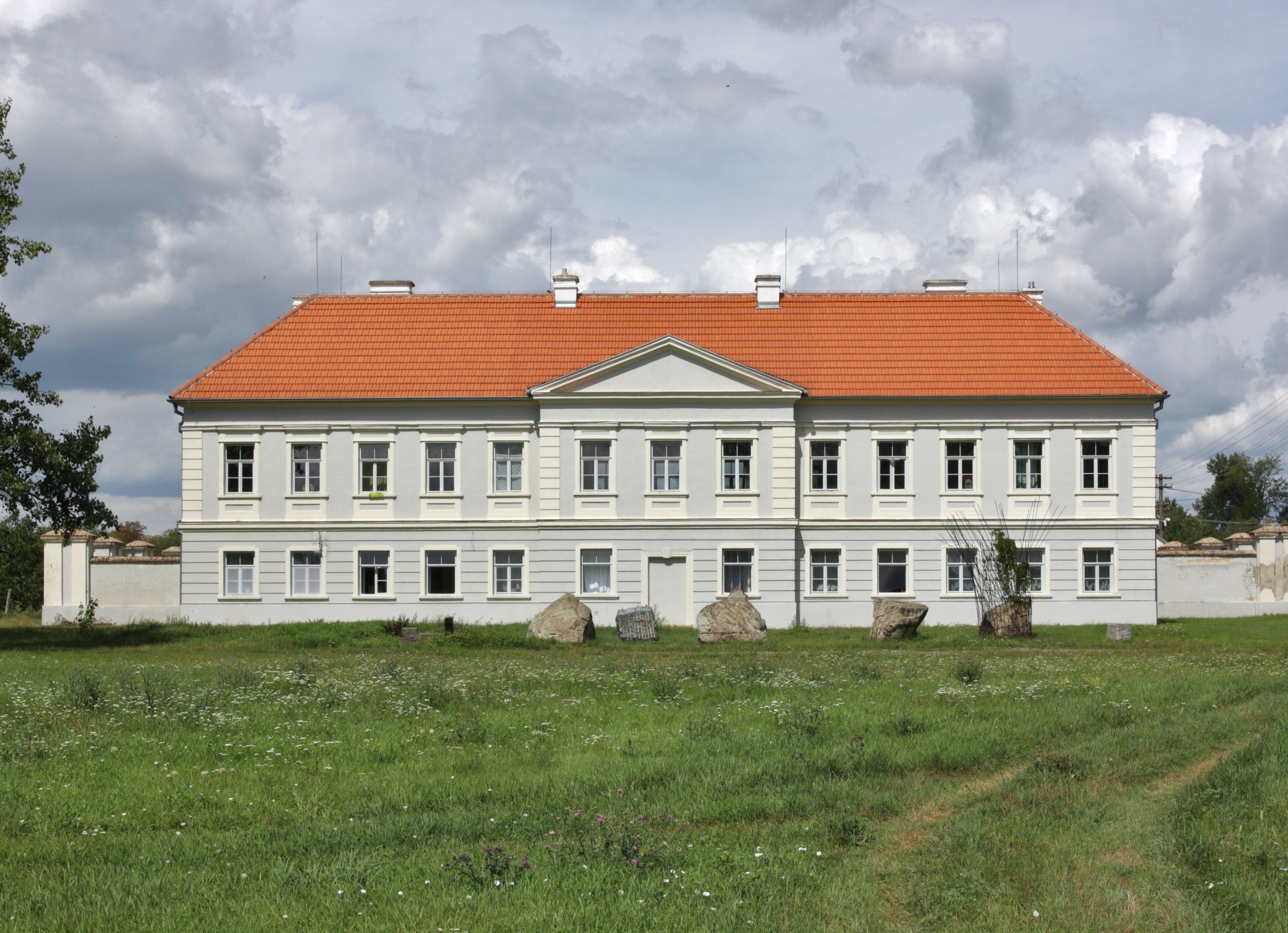
Leopoldsruhe manor house

The main landmark of Pohořelice is the Church of Saint James the Great. It is a three-nave Gothic church, which was gradually built from 1290 to 1580. Renaissance modifications were made in 1668.

A Baroque monument is the Paar's Manor House in the centre of the town. it was built at the end of the 17th century. Today the building belongs to the school complex.

Leopoldsruhe is a Baroque hunting manor house, built for Leopold of Dietrichstein in 1747. It is an architecturally valuable monument.

== Notable people ==
- Berthold Feiwel (1875–1937), Austrian writer, journalist and Zionist politician
- Eugen Beyer (1882–1940), Austrian field marshal
- Věra Špinarová (1951–2017), singer

== Twin towns – sister cities ==
Pohořelice is twinned with:

- Brezová pod Bradlom, Slovakia
- Poraj, Poland
