= Otmarov =

- Municipality
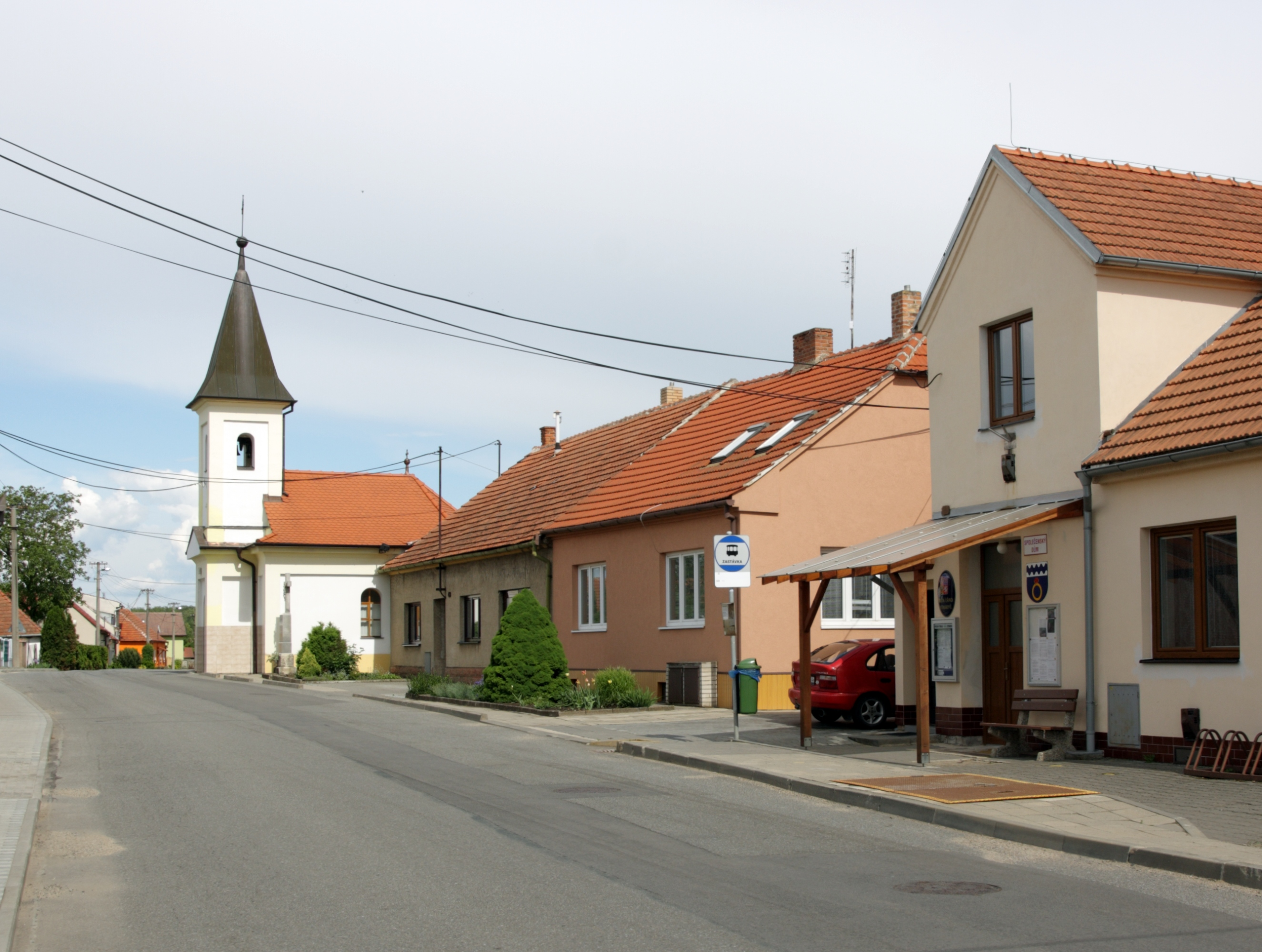
- Centre of Otmarov with the Chapel of Saint Othmar and municipal office

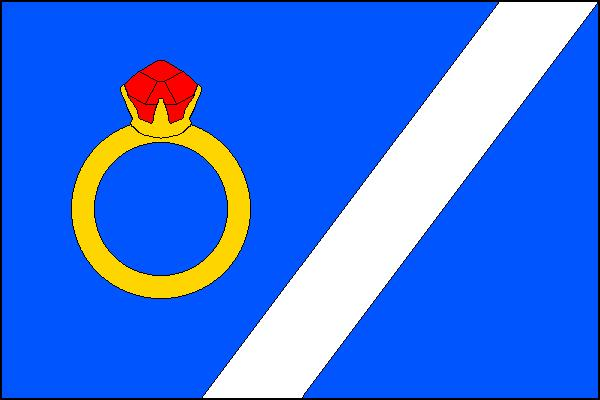
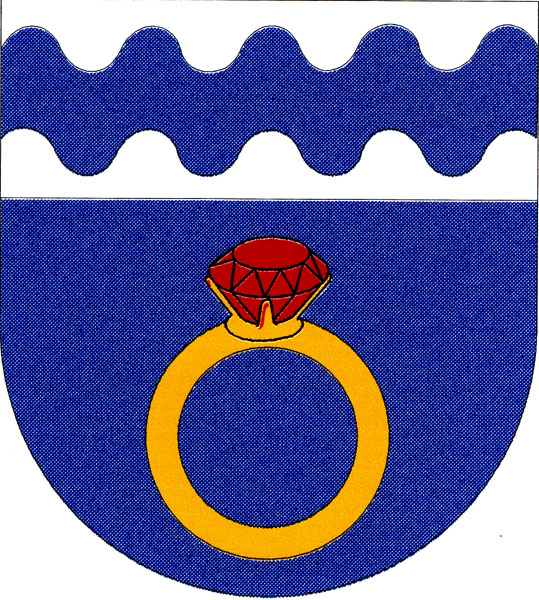
- Flag Coat of arms

- Location in the Czech Republic
- Coordinates: 49°6′2″N 16°40′22″E
- Country: Czech Republic
- Region: South Moravian
- District: Brno-Country
- Founded: 1783

Area
  - Total: 1.25 km^{2} (0.48 sq mi)
- Elevation: 189 m (620 ft)

Population (2026-01-01)
  - Total: 393
  - Density: 314/km^{2} (814/sq mi)
- Time zone: UTC+1 (CET)
  - Summer (DST): UTC+2 (CEST)
- Postal code: 664 57
- Website: www.otmarov.cz

Otmarov is a municipality and village in Brno-Country District in the South Moravian Region of the Czech Republic. It has about 400 inhabitants.

Otmarov lies approximately 12 kilometres (7 mi) south of Brno and 196 km (122 mi) south-east of Prague.

== Demographics ==
Historical population
Year	Pop.	±%
1869	133	—
1880	148	+11.3%
1890	155	+4.7%
1900	184	+18.7%
1910	178	−3.3%
1921	173	−2.8%
1930	193	+11.6%
1950	166	−14.0%
1961	188	+13.3%
1970	185	−1.6%
1980	181	−2.2%
1991	170	−6.1%
2001	175	+2.9%
2011	268	+53.1%
2021	374	+39.6%
Source: Censuses
