= Rajhradice =

- Municipality
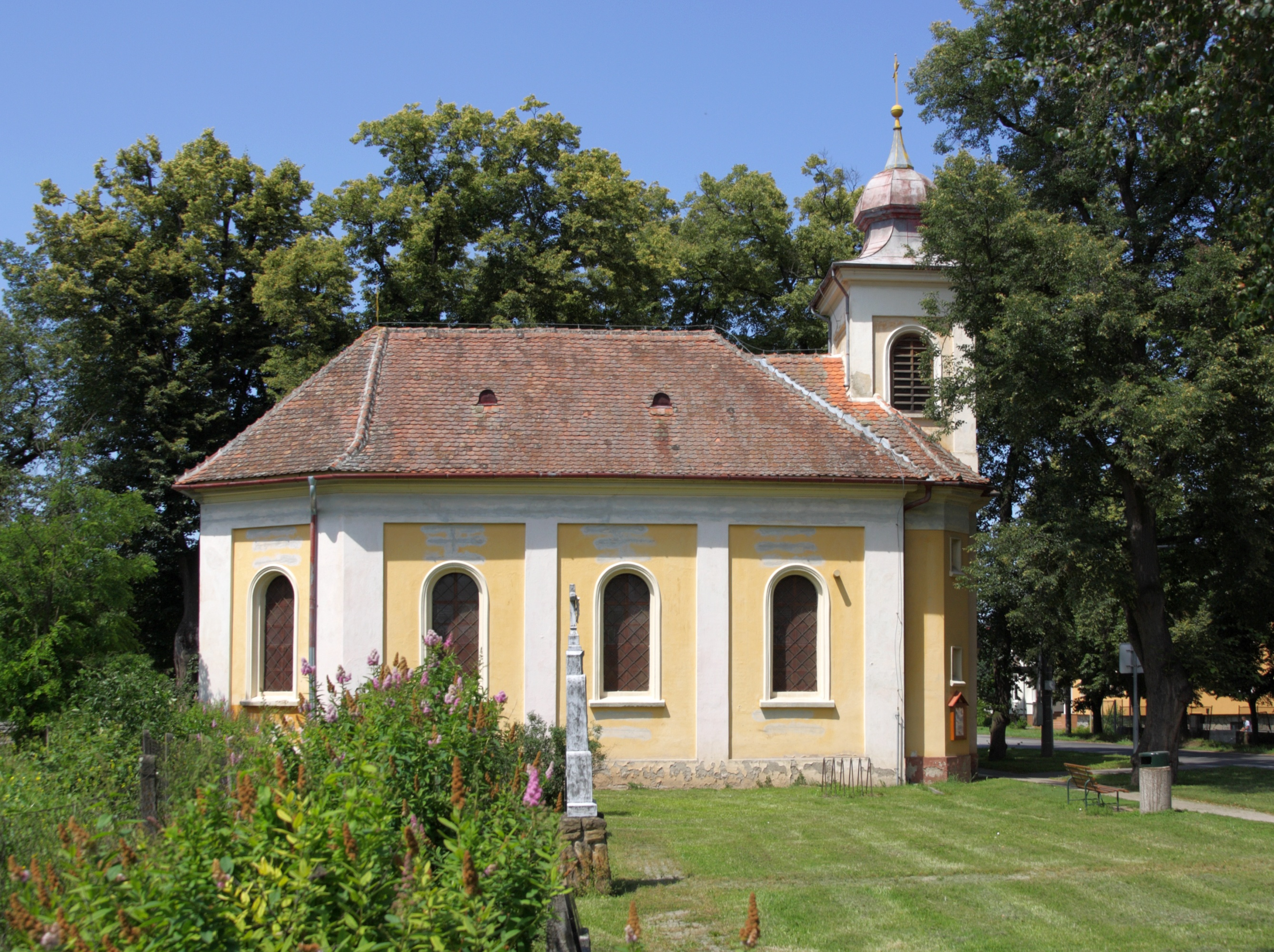
- Chapel of Saint Scholastica

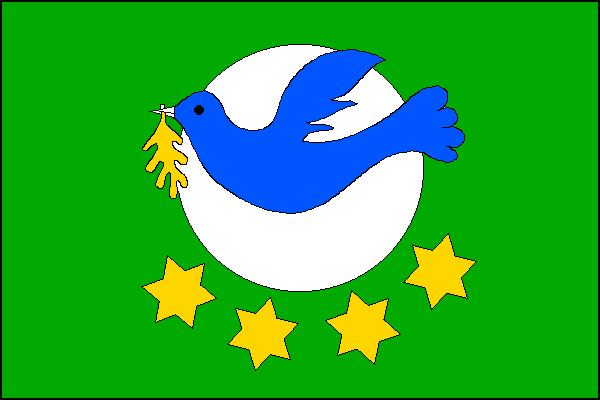
- Flag Coat of arms

- Location in the Czech Republic
- Coordinates: 49°5′31″N 16°37′46″E
- Country: Czech Republic
- Region: South Moravian
- District: Brno-Country
- First mentioned: 1048

Area
  - Total: 5.46 km^{2} (2.11 sq mi)
- Elevation: 186 m (610 ft)

Population (2026-01-01)
  - Total: 1,595
  - Density: 292/km^{2} (757/sq mi)
- Time zone: UTC+1 (CET)
  - Summer (DST): UTC+2 (CEST)
- Postal code: 664 61
- Website: www.rajhradice.cz

Rajhradice is a municipality and village in Brno-Country District in the South Moravian Region of the Czech Republic. It has about 1,600 inhabitants.

Rajhradice lies approximately 13 kilometres (8 mi) south of Brno and 195 km (121 mi) south-east of Prague.

== Demographics ==
Historical population
| Year | Pop. | ±% |
|---|---|---|
| 1869 | 546 | — |
| 1880 | 621 | +13.7% |
| 1890 | 653 | +5.2% |
| 1900 | 712 | +9.0% |
| 1910 | 766 | +7.6% |
| 1921 | 789 | +3.0% |
| 1930 | 1,114 | +41.2% |
| 1950 | 1,063 | −4.6% |
| 1961 | 1,266 | +19.1% |
| 1970 | 1,229 | −2.9% |
| 1980 | 1,186 | −3.5% |
| 1991 | 1,090 | −8.1% |
| 2001 | 1,176 | +7.9% |
| 2011 | 1,263 | +7.4% |
| 2021 | 1,479 | +17.1% |
Source: Censuses
