= Rebešovice =

- Municipality
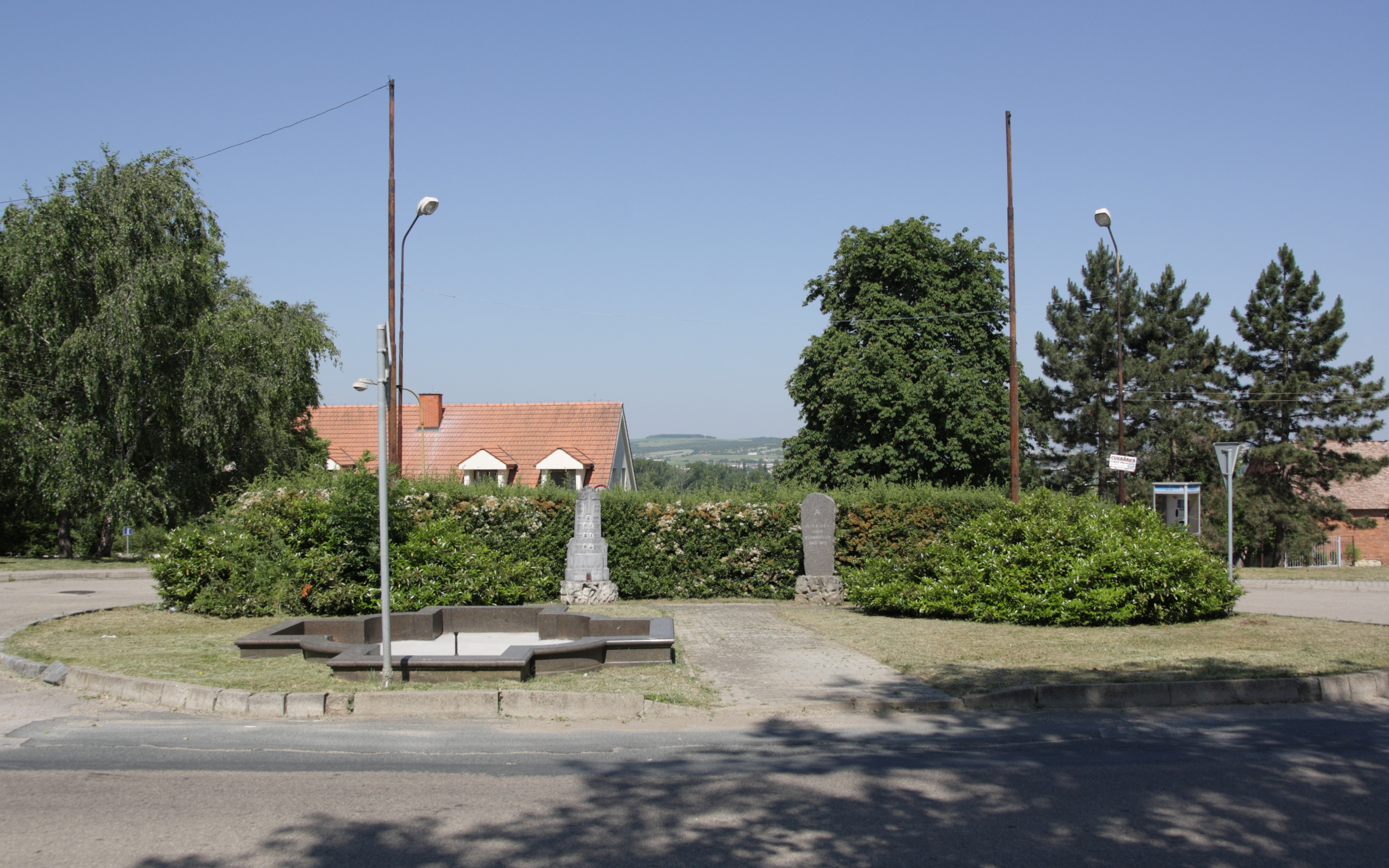
- Centre of Rebešovice

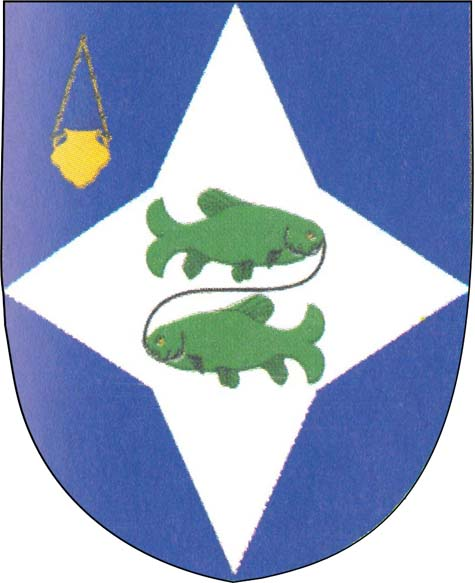
- Flag Coat of arms

- Location in the Czech Republic
- Coordinates: 49°6′19″N 16°38′7″E
- Country: Czech Republic
- Region: South Moravian
- District: Brno-Country
- First mentioned: 1174

Area
  - Total: 4.11 km^{2} (1.59 sq mi)
- Elevation: 204 m (669 ft)

Population (2026-01-01)
  - Total: 1,106
  - Density: 269/km^{2} (697/sq mi)
- Time zone: UTC+1 (CET)
  - Summer (DST): UTC+2 (CEST)
- Postal code: 664 61
- Website: www.obecrebesovice.cz

Rebešovice is a municipality and village in Brno-Country District in the South Moravian Region of the Czech Republic. It has about 1,100 inhabitants.

Rebešovice lies approximately 11 kilometres (7 mi) south of Brno and 194 km (121 mi) south-east of Prague.

== Demographics ==
Historical population
Year	Pop.	±%
1869	208	—
1880	182	−12.5%
1890	189	+3.8%
1900	190	+0.5%
1910	200	+5.3%
1921	241	+20.5%
1930	296	+22.8%
1950	251	−15.2%
1961	305	+21.5%
1970	281	−7.9%
1980	306	+8.9%
1991	413	+35.0%
2001	524	+26.9%
2011	887	+69.3%
2021	1,087	+22.5%
Source: Censuses
