= Nebovidy =

Nebovidy may refer to places in the Czech Republic:

- Nebovidy (Brno-Country District), a municipality and village in the South Moravian Region
- Nebovidy (Kolín District), a municipality and village in the Central Bohemian Region
