= Nebovidy (Brno-Country District) =

- Municipality
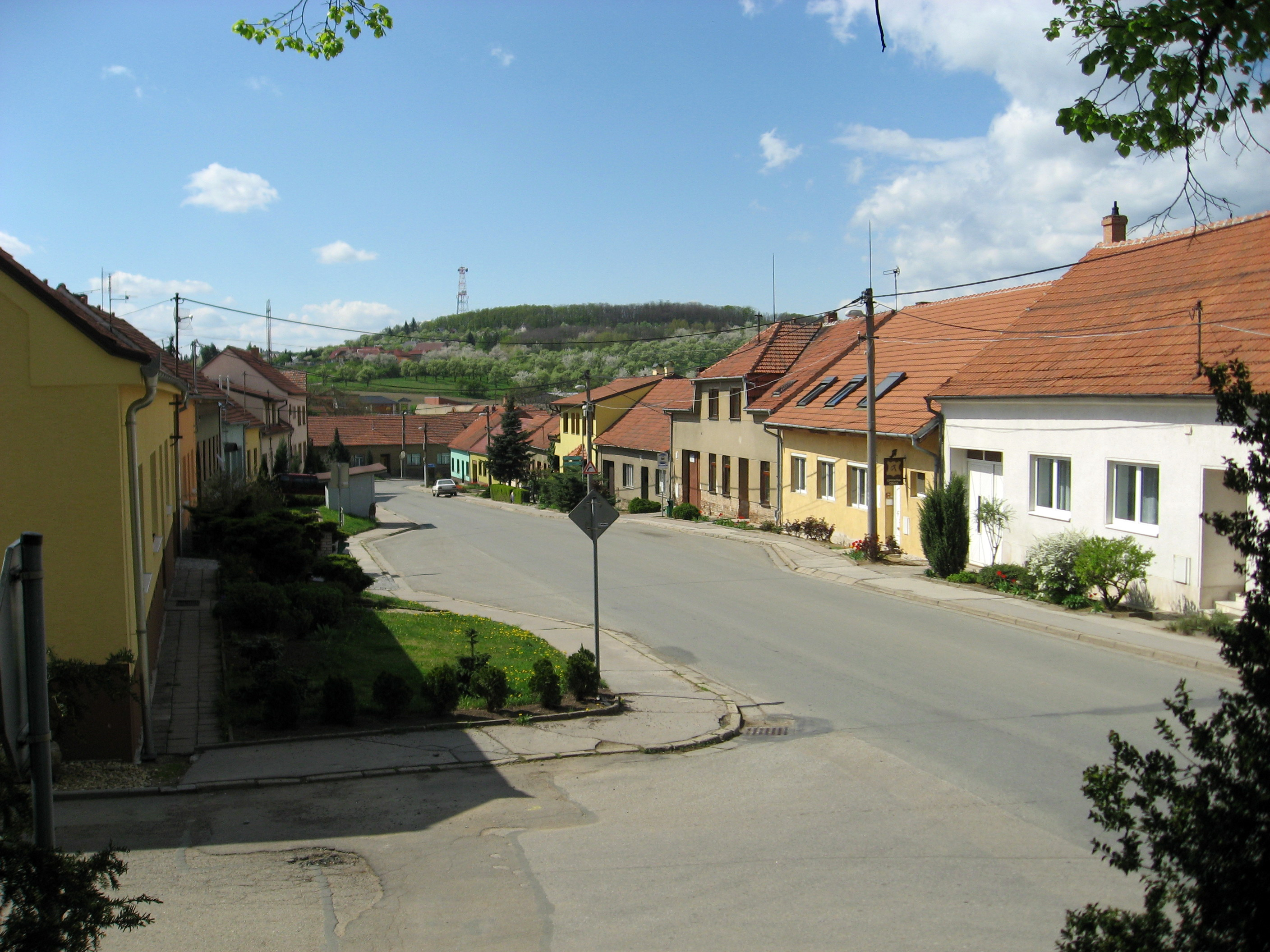
- Main road

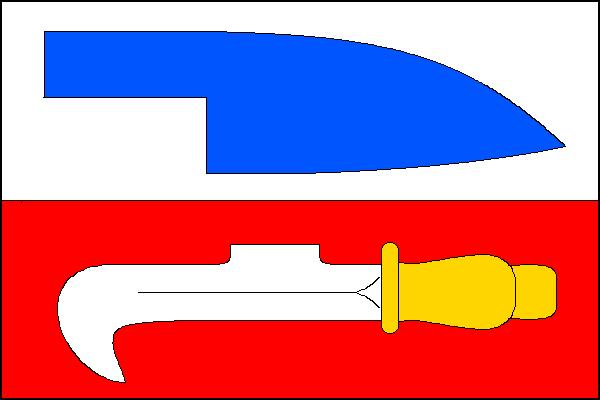
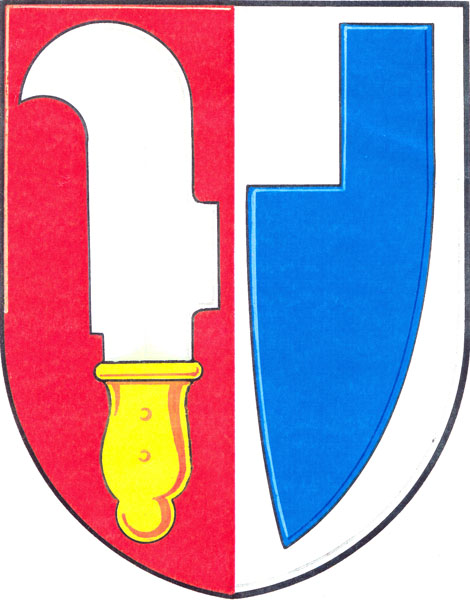
- Flag Coat of arms

- Location in the Czech Republic
- Coordinates: 49°8′29″N 16°33′5″E
- Country: Czech Republic
- Region: South Moravian
- District: Brno-Country
- First mentioned: 1104

Area
  - Total: 4.50 km^{2} (1.74 sq mi)
- Elevation: 303 m (994 ft)

Population (2026-01-01)
  - Total: 879
  - Density: 195/km^{2} (506/sq mi)
- Time zone: UTC+1 (CET)
  - Summer (DST): UTC+2 (CEST)
- Postal codes: 664 48
- Website: www.nebovidyubrna.cz

Nebovidy is a municipality and village in Brno-Country District in the South Moravian Region of the Czech Republic. It has about 900 inhabitants.

Nebovidy lies approximately 9 kilometres (6 mi) south-west of Brno and 186 km (116 mi) south-east of Prague.

== Demographics ==
Historical population
| Year | Pop. | ±% |
|---|---|---|
| 1869 | 313 | — |
| 1880 | 343 | +9.6% |
| 1890 | 372 | +8.5% |
| 1900 | 427 | +14.8% |
| 1910 | 491 | +15.0% |
| 1921 | 509 | +3.7% |
| 1930 | 540 | +6.1% |
| 1950 | 495 | −8.3% |
| 1961 | 564 | +13.9% |
| 1970 | 533 | −5.5% |
| 1980 | 478 | −10.3% |
| 1991 | 443 | −7.3% |
| 2001 | 435 | −1.8% |
| 2011 | 624 | +43.4% |
| 2021 | 841 | +34.8% |
Source: Censuses
