= Křižínkov =

- Municipality
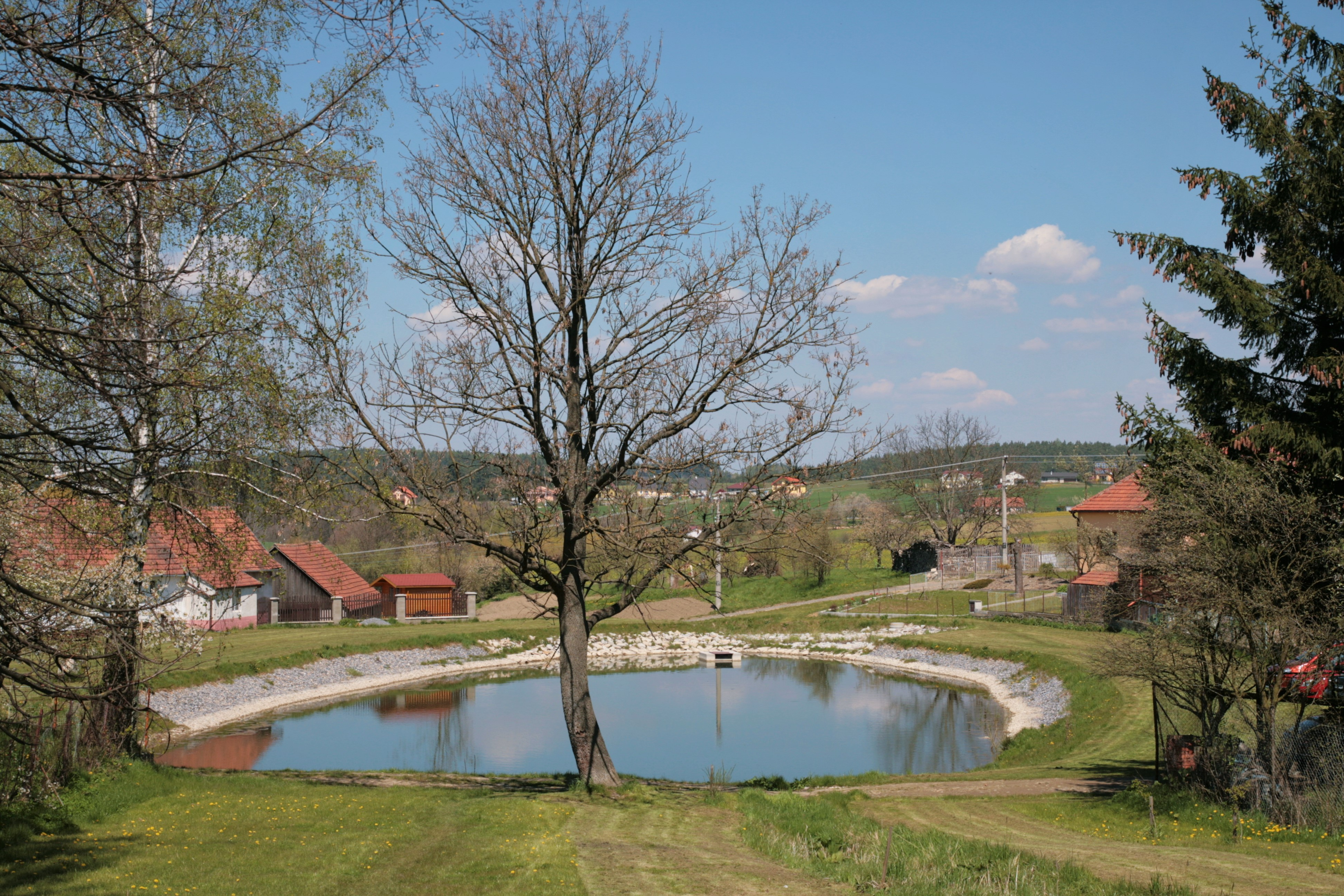
- Centre of Křižínkov

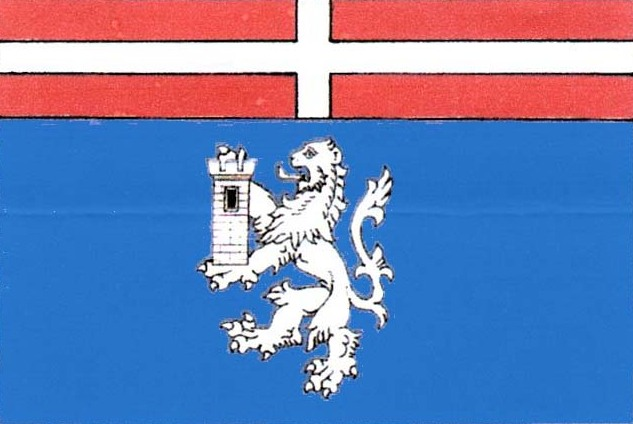
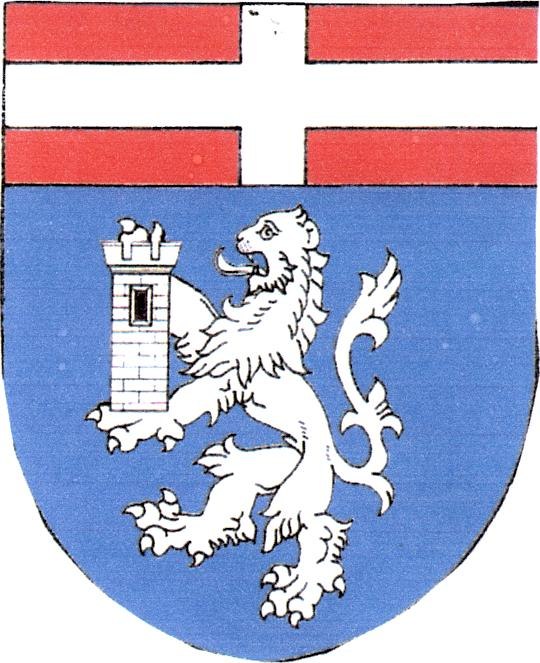
- Flag Coat of arms

- Location in the Czech Republic
- Coordinates: 49°19′33″N 16°16′13″E
- Country: Czech Republic
- Region: South Moravian
- District: Brno-Country
- First mentioned: 1309

Area
  - Total: 2.90 km^{2} (1.12 sq mi)
- Elevation: 468 m (1,535 ft)

Population (2026-01-01)
  - Total: 229
  - Density: 79.0/km^{2} (205/sq mi)
- Time zone: UTC+1 (CET)
  - Summer (DST): UTC+2 (CEST)
- Postal code: 594 53
- Website: www.krizinkov.cz

Křižínkov is a municipality and village in Brno-Country District in the South Moravian Region of the Czech Republic. It has about 200 inhabitants.

Křižínkov lies approximately 30 kilometres (19 mi) north-west of Brno and 158 km (98 mi) south-east of Prague.

== Demographics ==
Historical population
Year	Pop.	±%
1869	357	—
1880	374	+4.8%
1890	355	−5.1%
1900	317	−10.7%
1910	306	−3.5%
1921	316	+3.3%
1930	294	−7.0%
1950	278	−5.4%
1961	277	−0.4%
1970	243	−12.3%
1980	248	+2.1%
1991	222	−10.5%
2001	202	−9.0%
2011	188	−6.9%
2021	225	+19.7%
Source: Censuses
