= Dolní Věstonice =

- Municipality
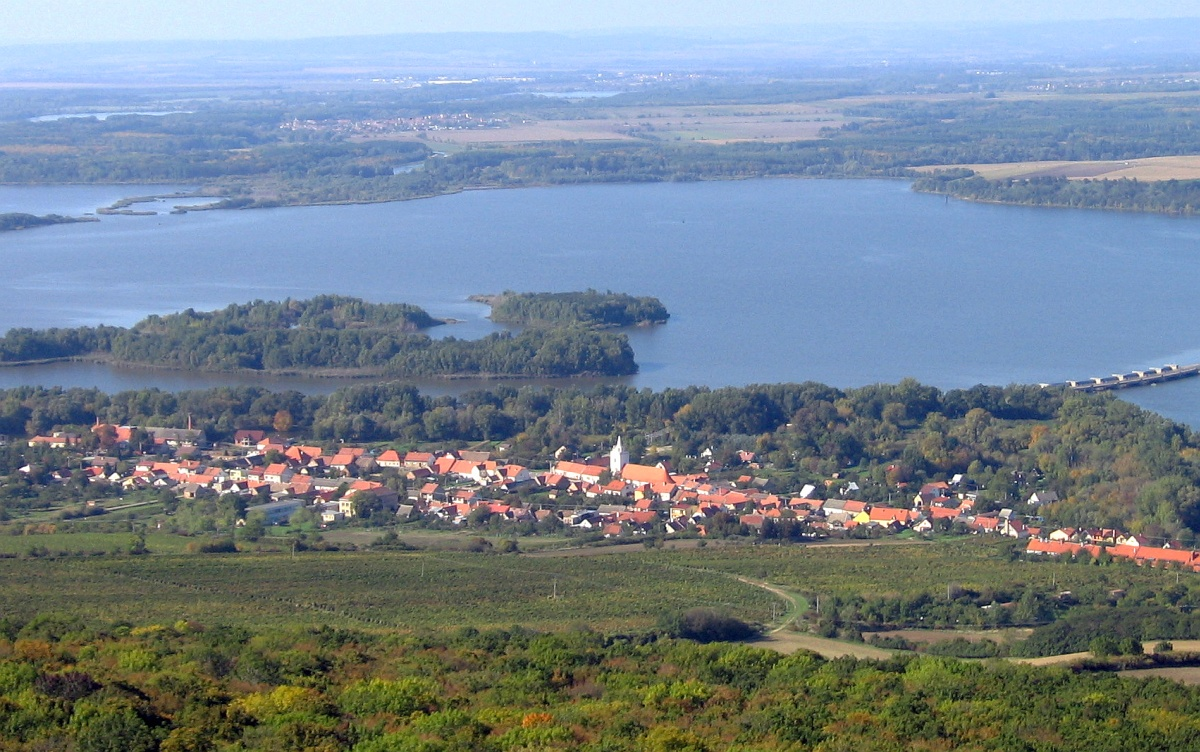
- View of Dolní Věstonice from Děvín

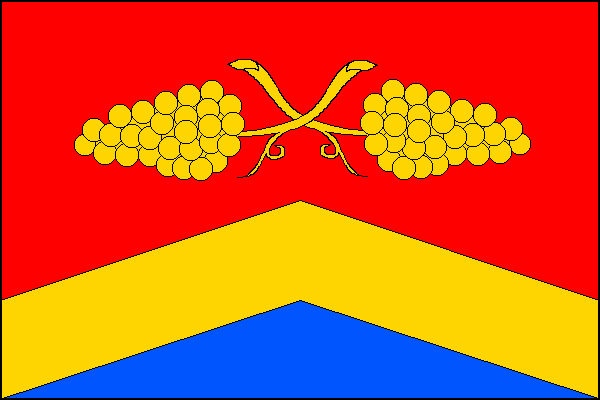
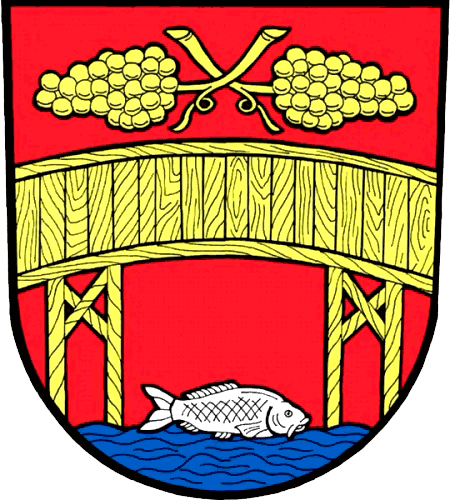
- Flag Coat of arms

- Location in the Czech Republic
- Coordinates: 48°53′14″N 16°38′38″E
- Country: Czech Republic
- Region: South Moravian
- District: Břeclav
- First mentioned: 1312

Area
  - Total: 8.82 km^{2} (3.41 sq mi)
- Elevation: 174 m (571 ft)

Population (2026-01-01)
  - Total: 308
  - Density: 34.9/km^{2} (90.4/sq mi)
- Time zone: UTC+1 (CET)
  - Summer (DST): UTC+2 (CEST)
- Postal code: 691 29
- Website: www.obecdolnivestonice.cz

Dolní Věstonice (Czech pronunciation: [ˈdolɲiː ˈvjɛstoɲɪtsɛ]; German: Unterwisternitz) is a municipality and village in Břeclav District in the South Moravian Region of the Czech Republic. It has about 300 inhabitants. The municipality is located on the shore of the Nové Mlýny reservoirs, on the border between the Mikulov Highlands and Dyje–Svratka Valley.

Dolní Věstonice is known for the eponymous archaeological site and it gave the name to one of the oldest known works of art in the world, Venus of Dolní Věstonice.

== Geography ==
Dolní Věstonice is located about 22 kilometres (14 mi) northwest of Břeclav and 33 km (21 mi) south of Brno. It lies on the border between the Mikulov Highlands and Dyje–Svratka Valley. The highest point is at 316 m (1,037 ft) above sea level. The village is situated on the shore of the Nové Mlýny reservoirs. The municipality is partly located in the Pálava Protected Landscape Area. The area of the reservoir is protected as the Věstonice Reservoir Nature Reserve.

== History ==
=== Prehistoric times ===
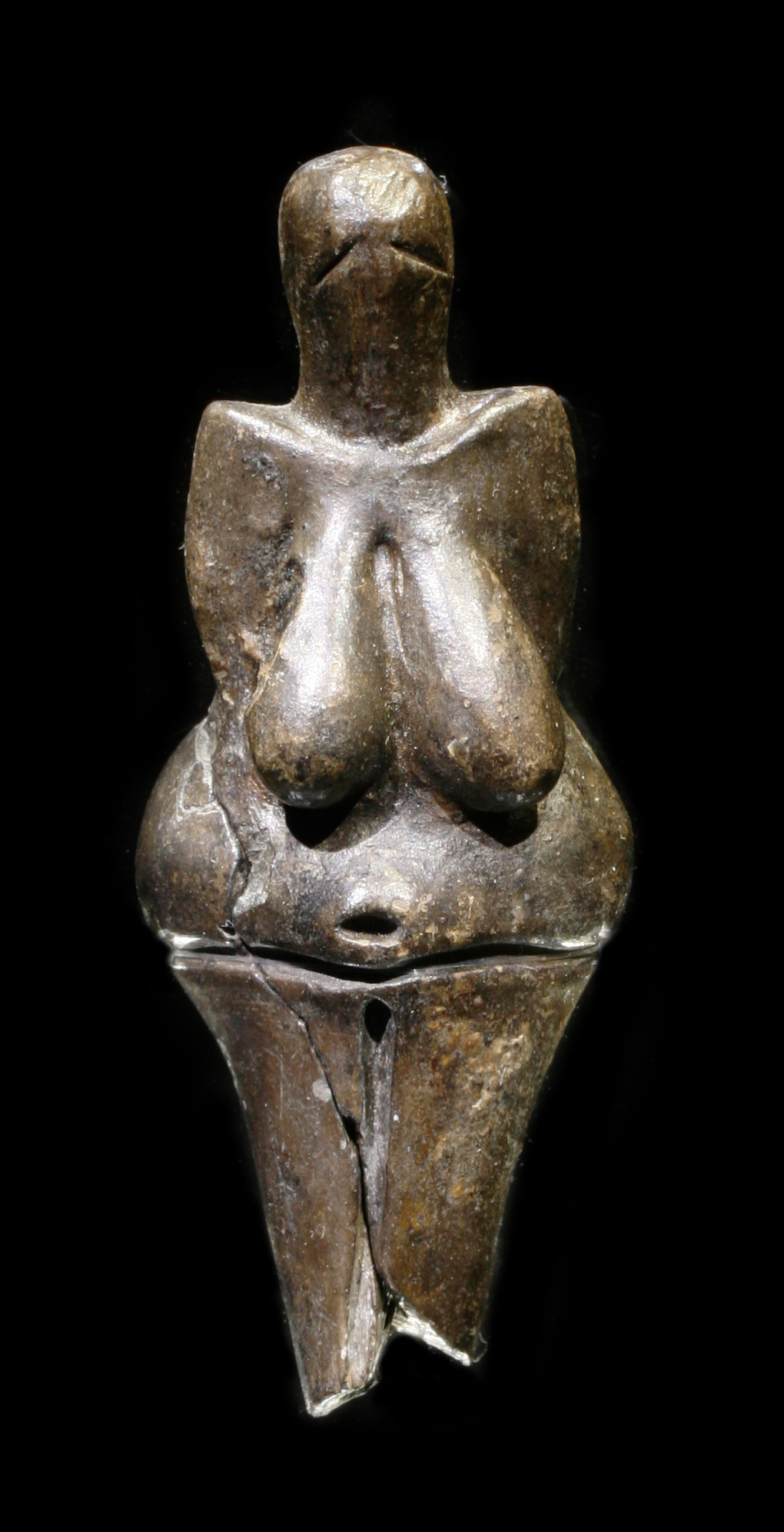
Venus of Dolní Věstonice

Dolní Věstonice is known for the Dolní Věstonice archaeological site. Approximately 25,000 years ago, during the Upper Paleolithic period of the Stone Age, a small settlement of mammoth hunters consisting of huts built with rocks and mammoth bones was founded on the site of what is now Dolní Věstonice. This is the oldest permanent human settlement that has ever been found. Numerous other archaeological discoveries point to extensive human habitation of the area in prehistoric times. The archaeological site is also known for the finding of the Venus of Dolní Věstonice, one of the most important archaeological discoveries in Europe and one of the oldest and most famous art pieces in the world.

=== 9th–20th century ===
During the Great Moravia period, which lasted between the 9th and 10th centuries, a small Slavic gord was built here. The gord protected a ford on an important trade route.

The first written mention of Věstonice is from 1312. During the 13th century the place became inhabited by German colonists. In 1460, the village was promoted to a market town by King George of Poděbrady. From the beginning of the 16th century until their expulsion in 1622, the Anabaptists settled here. They were famous for their high level of education and the establishment of wine cellars, which have survived to this day.

In 1938, it was annexed by Nazi Germany and administered as part of the Reichsgau Niederdonau. The German-speaking population was expelled in 1945 according to the Beneš decrees and replaced by Czech settlers.

== Demographics ==
Historical population

Year	Pop.	±%
1869	779	—
1880	752	−3.5%
1890	826	+9.8%
1900	842	+1.9%
1910	771	−8.4%

Year	Pop.	±%
1921	686	−11.0%
1930	688	+0.3%
1950	412	−40.1%
1961	450	+9.2%
1970	376	−16.4%

Year	Pop.	±%
1980	356	−5.3%
1991	334	−6.2%
2001	339	+1.5%
2011	294	−13.3%
2021	279	−5.1%

Source: Censuses

== Economy ==
Dolní Věstonice is known for viticulture. The municipality lies in the Mikulovská wine subregion.

== Transport ==
There are no railways or major roads passing through the municipality.

== Sights ==
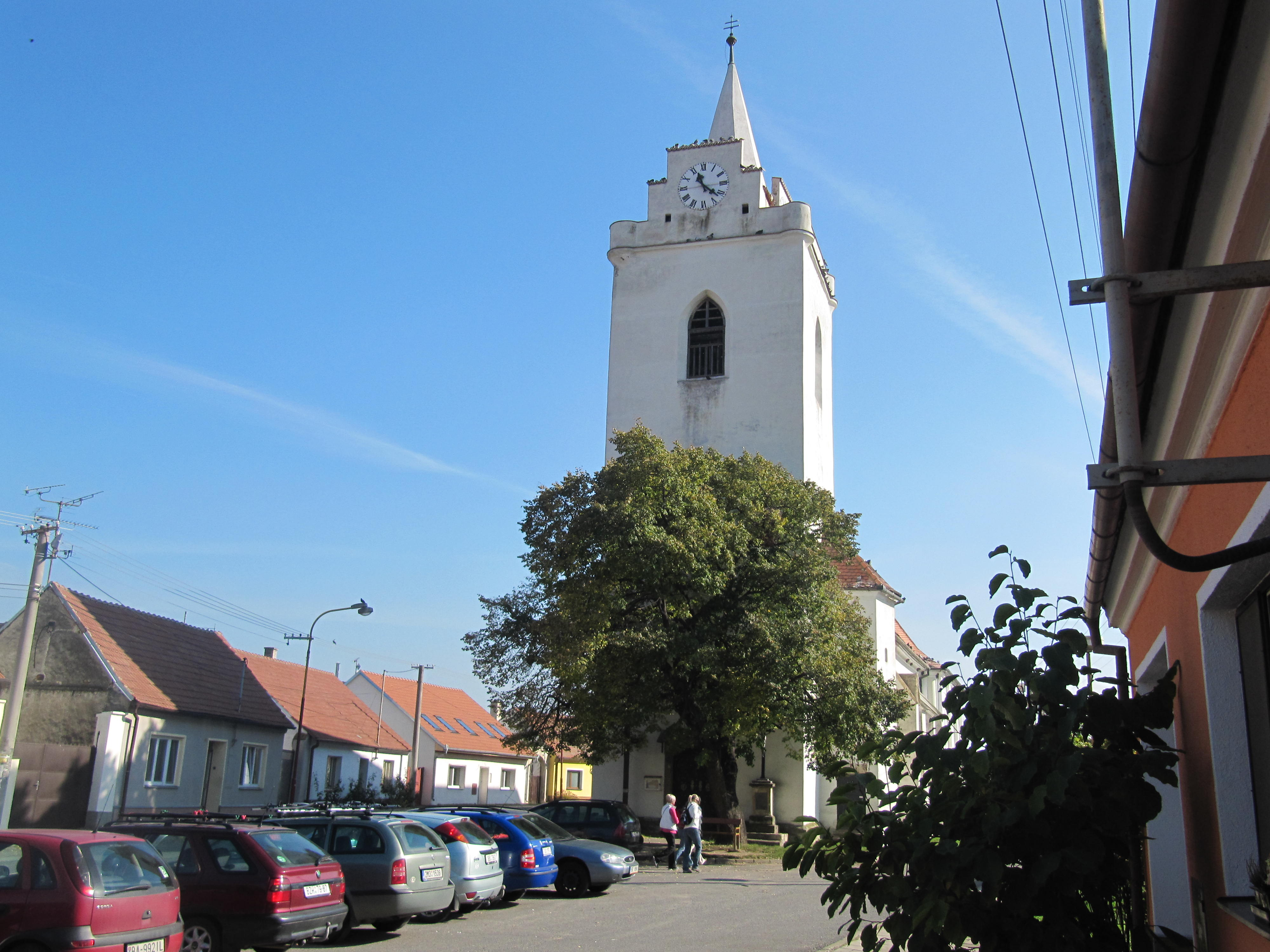
Centre of Dolní Věstonice with the Church of Saint Michael the Archangel

The main landmark of Dolní Věstonice is the Church of Saint Michael the Archangel. It is a Baroque building with a Gothic core and Renaissance tower.

Tourist attractions follow the archaeological glory of the municipality. The archaeological site includes an outdoor exhibition. An educational archaeological path leads from Dolní Věstonice to neighbouring Pavlov.

Remains of the gord rampart and floor plan of the church, which stood here until the early 13th century, are preserved.
