= Věstonice =

Věstonice may refer to several geographical locations and objects in the Břeclav District, South Moravian Region, Czech Republic:

- Dolní Věstonice, a village and archeological site
  - Dolní Věstonice (archaeological site), an Upper Paleolithic excavation site
  - Venus of Dolní Věstonice, a ceramic figurine of a nude woman, dated 29,000 – 25,000 BC
- Horní Věstonice, a village
- Věstonice Reservoir, one of the Nové Mlýny reservoirs on the Thaya River
