= Pavlov (Břeclav District) =

- Municipality
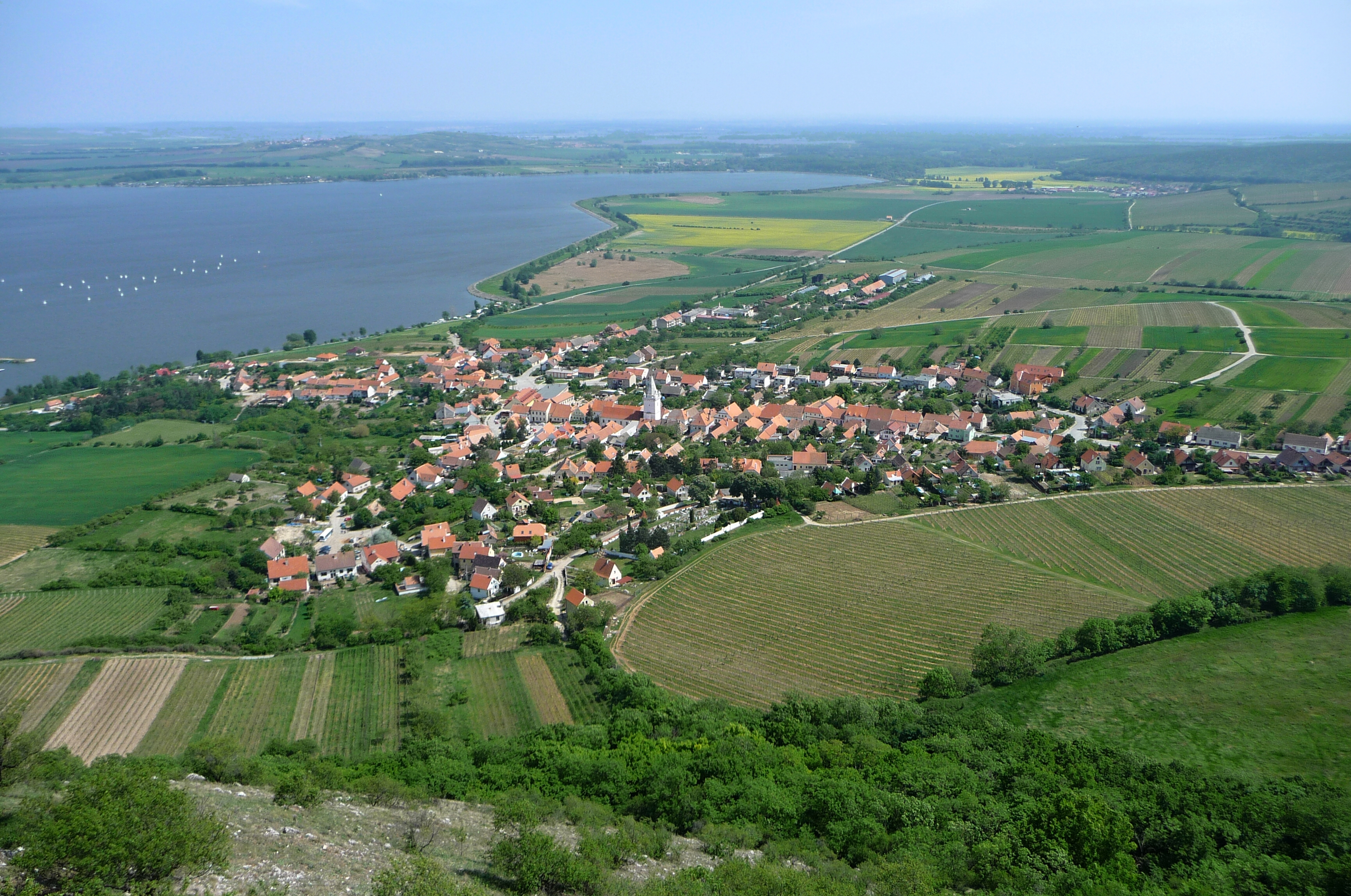
- Aerial view

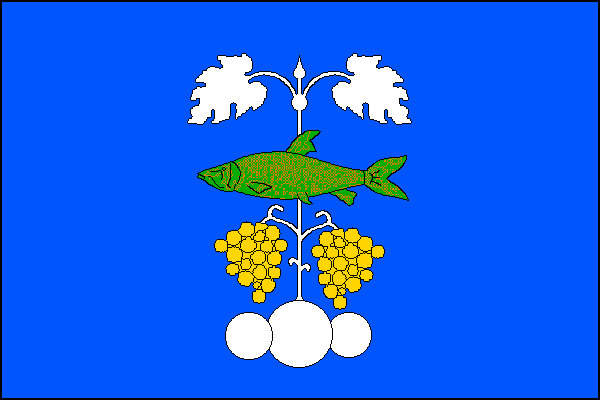
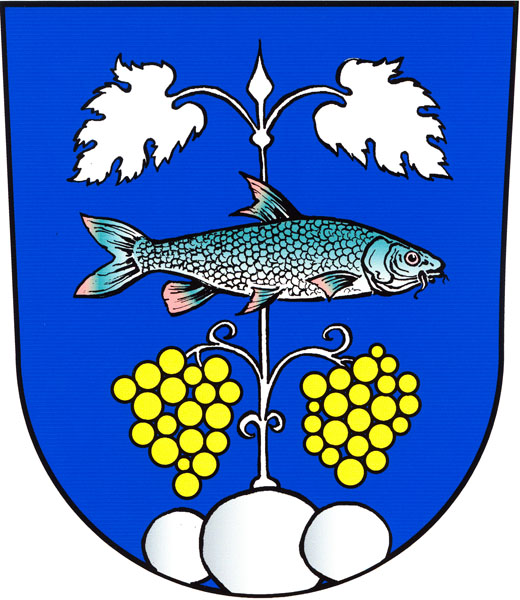
- Flag Coat of arms

- Location in the Czech Republic
- Coordinates: 48°52′27″N 16°40′20″E
- Country: Czech Republic
- Region: South Moravian
- District: Břeclav
- First mentioned: 1046

Area
  - Total: 13.03 km^{2} (5.03 sq mi)
- Elevation: 245 m (804 ft)

Population (2026-01-01)
  - Total: 618
  - Density: 47.4/km^{2} (123/sq mi)
- Time zone: UTC+1 (CET)
  - Summer (DST): UTC+2 (CEST)
- Postal code: 692 01
- Website: www.obec-pavlov.cz

Pavlov (German: Pollau) is a municipality and village in Břeclav District in the South Moravian Region of the Czech Republic. It has about 600 inhabitants.

== Geography ==
Pavlov is located about 20 kilometres (12 mi) northwest of Břeclav and 34 km (21 mi) south of Brno. It lies in the Mikulov Highlands. The village lies under the Děvín mountain, which is the highest mountain of the municipality and of the entire Mikulov Highlands with an elevation of 550 metres (1,804 ft). It is situated on the shore of the Nové Mlýny reservoirs. The municipality is located in the Pálava Protected Landscape Area.

== Demographics ==
Historical population
Year	Pop.	±%
1869	981	—
1880	1,112	+13.4%
1890	1,123	+1.0%
1900	1,117	−0.5%
1910	1,105	−1.1%
1921	1,116	+1.0%
1930	1,089	−2.4%
1950	658	−39.6%
1961	608	−7.6%
1970	532	−12.5%
1980	504	−5.3%
1991	546	+8.3%
2001	543	−0.5%
2011	526	−3.1%
2021	583	+10.8%
Source: Censuses

== See also ==
- Pavlovian culture
