= Bulhary (Břeclav District) =

- Municipality
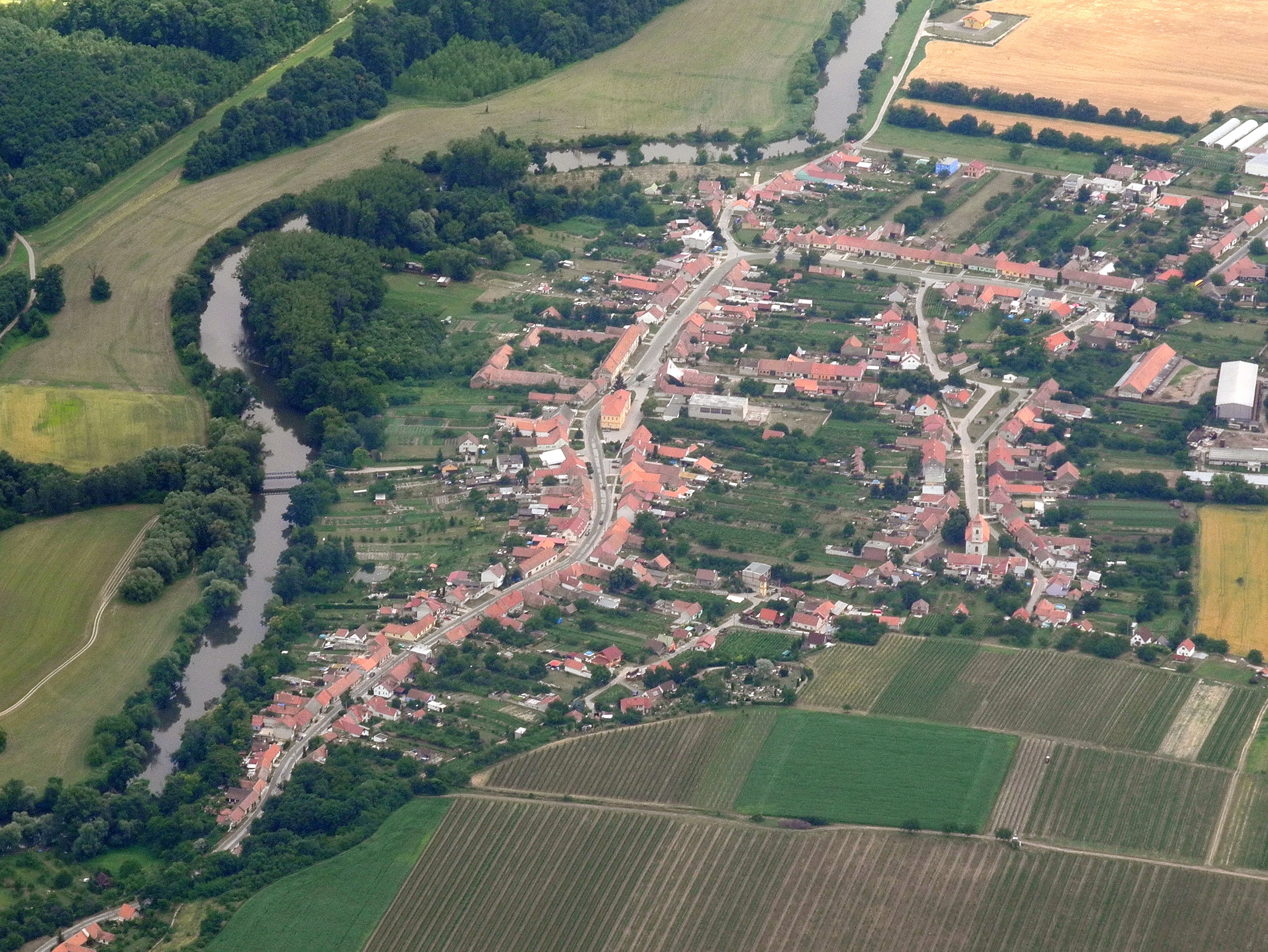
- Aerial view from the northwest

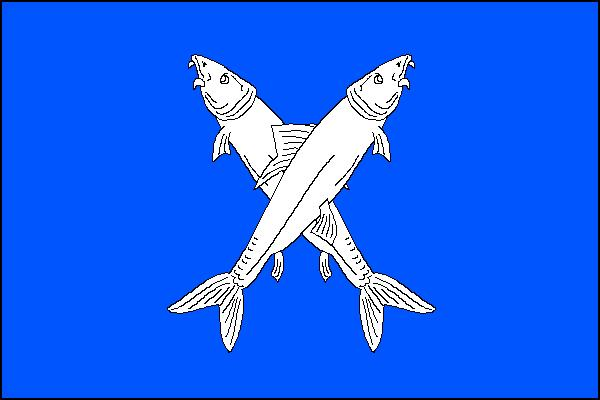
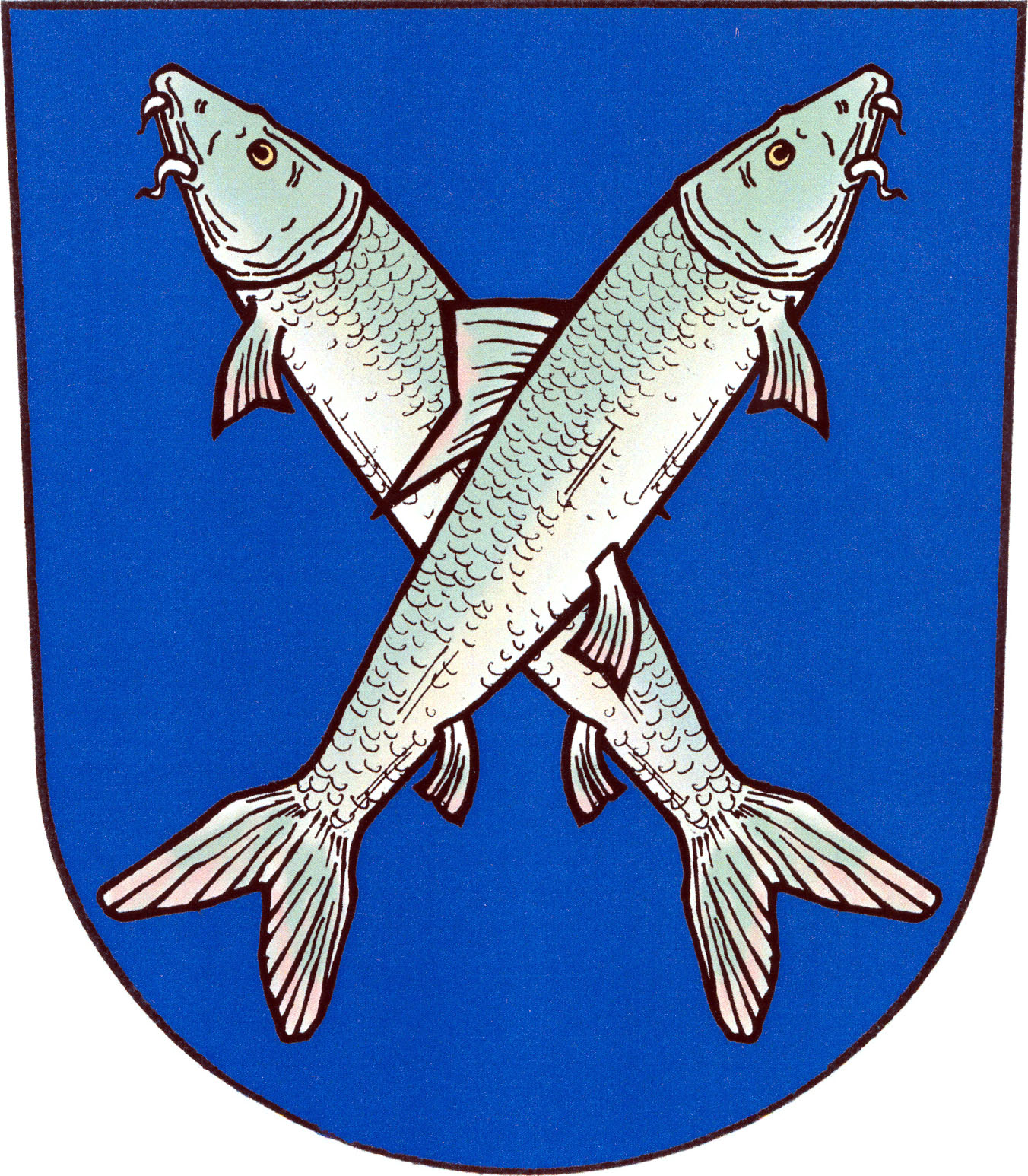
- Flag Coat of arms

- Location in the Czech Republic
- Coordinates: 48°49′53″N 16°44′55″E
- Country: Czech Republic
- Region: South Moravian
- District: Břeclav
- First mentioned: 1244

Area
  - Total: 15.16 km^{2} (5.85 sq mi)
- Elevation: 170 m (560 ft)

Population (2026-01-01)
  - Total: 745
  - Density: 49.1/km^{2} (127/sq mi)
- Time zone: UTC+1 (CET)
  - Summer (DST): UTC+2 (CEST)
- Postal code: 691 89
- Website: www.bulhary.cz

Bulhary (until 1949 Pulgary; German: Pulgram) is a municipality and village in Břeclav District in the South Moravian Region of the Czech Republic. It has about 700 inhabitants. Bulhary is partly located within the Lednice–Valtice Cultural Landscape, which is a UNESCO World Heritage Site.

== Geography ==
Bulhary is located about 13 kilometres (8 mi) northwest of Břeclav and 40 km (25 mi) south of Brno. It lies mostly in the Upper Morava Valley, only a small part of the municipal territory lies in the Mikulov Highlands. The highest point is at 278 m (912 ft) above sea level. The Thaya River flows through the town. The northwestern part of the municipality lies within the Pálava Protected Landscape Area.

== History ==
The area of the village and its surroundings has been inhabited since time immemorial due to the fertile soil and proximity to the river. At the hill Syslí kopec is an archaeological site where the remains of mammoth hunters weapons (28,000–24,000 years BC old) were found. The first written mention of Bulhary is from 1244.

== Demographics ==
Historical population

Year	Pop.	±%
1869	906	—
1880	1,044	+15.2%
1890	1,008	−3.4%
1900	1,097	+8.8%
1910	1,109	+1.1%

Year	Pop.	±%
1921	1,124	+1.4%
1930	1,144	+1.8%
1950	708	−38.1%
1961	838	+18.4%
1970	816	−2.6%

Year	Pop.	±%
1980	832	+2.0%
1991	776	−6.7%
2001	813	+4.8%
2011	769	−5.4%
2021	701	−8.8%

Source: Censuses

== Economy ==
Bulhary is known for viticulture and winemaking. The municipality lies in the Mikulovská wine subregion. This tradition dates back to the 13th century. There are about 98 hectares (240 acres) of vineyards.

== Transport ==
There are no railways or major roads passing through the municipality.

== Sights ==
The main landmark of Bulhary is the Church of Saint Giles. It was built in the late Baroque style in 1769.

The Lednice–Valtice Cultural Landscape, a UNESCO World Heritage Site extends into the southeastern part of the municipal territory, but there are no specific monuments here.
