= Mikulov Highlands =

Mountain range in the Czech Republic

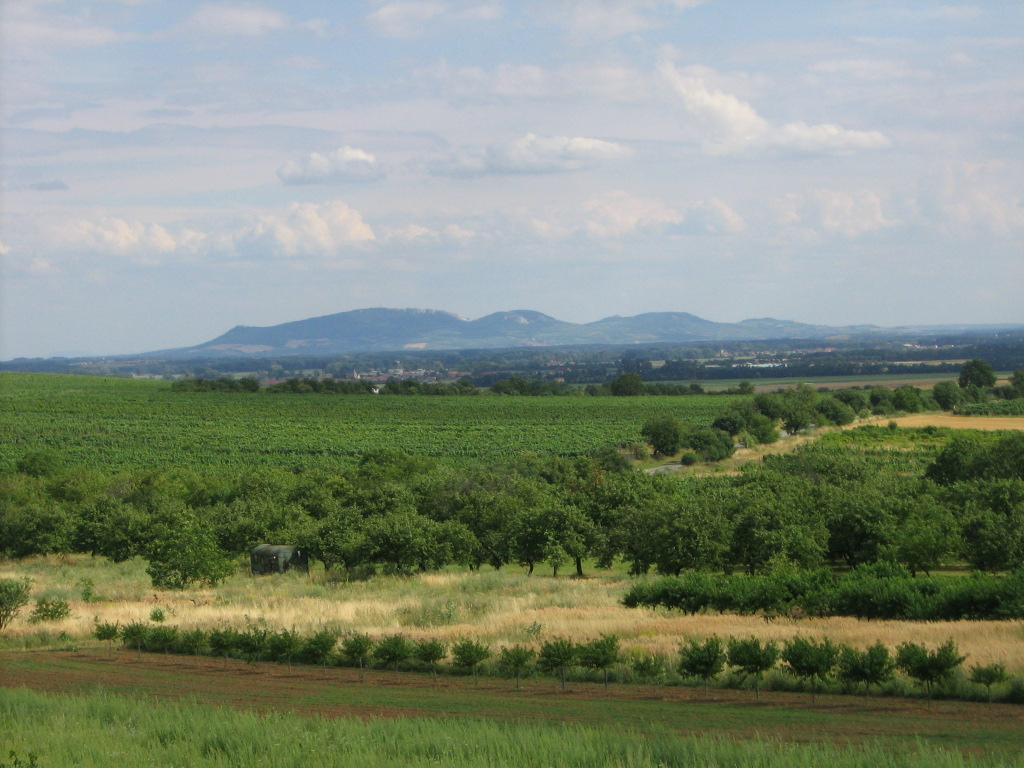
- Mikulov Highlands from the north

Highest point
- Peak: Děvín
- Elevation: 550 m n.m.

Dimensions
- Length: 10 km (6.2 mi)

Geography
- Location within Czech Republic
- Country: Czech Republic
- State: South Moravian Region
- Range coordinates: 48°52′00″N 16°38′30″E
- Parent range: Carpathian

The Mikulov Highlands (Czech: Mikulovská vrchovina) is a mountain range in the South Moravian Region of the Czech Republic. The Highlands, together with the Waschberg Zone and Lower Austria Inselberg threshold, form the South-Moravian Carpathians.

== Geography ==
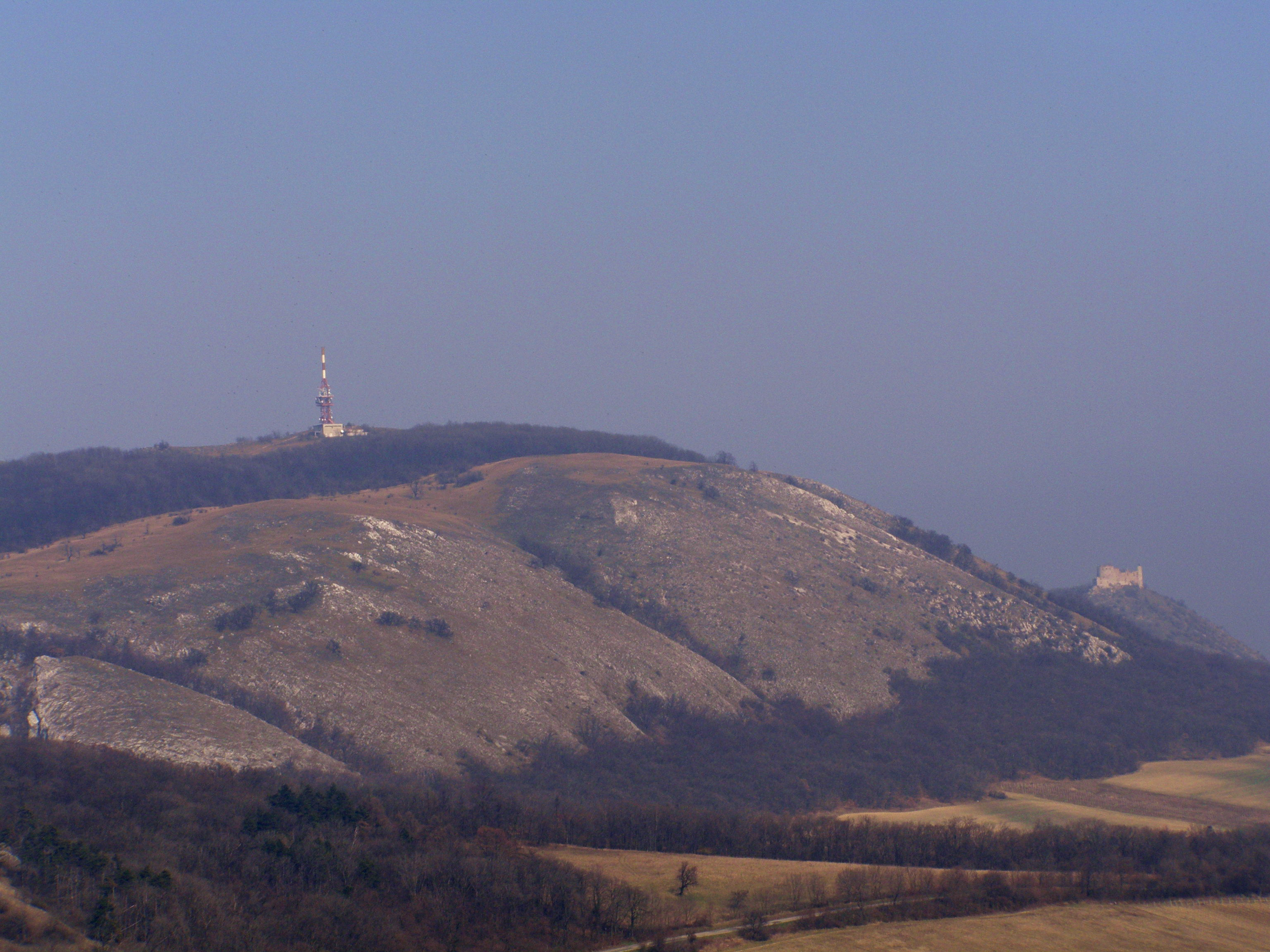
Děvín, the highest peak in the Mikulov Highlands

The Mikulov Highlands rise to the south of the Thaya between Nový Přerov, the Nové Mlýny reservoirs, Bulhary, Mikulov, and the Austrian border. The Highlands have an area of 81 square kilometres (31 sq mi) and an average height of 263.4 metres (864 ft). The highest peak is Děvín at 550 metres (1,800 ft); other peaks are Obora (481 metres (1,578 ft)), Stolova hora (458 metres (1,503 ft)), Pálava (461 metres (1,512 ft)), Stará hora (351 metres (1,152 ft)), and Turold (385 metres (1,263 ft)).

To the north is the Thaya River valley, the natural border with Lower Morava Valley. To the east is the mountainous region between the Thaya and Včelínek, also from the Lower Morava Valley. To the southeast is the March Field, and to the southwest a ridge in Austria in the Waschberg Zone which forms the western border of the Thaya valley. Geomorphological subunits form Pálava (Pavlov Hills) and the hill country Milovická pahorkatina.

The mountain range is partly fenced and contains several vineyards that constitute part of the Mikulovská wine sub-region. Most of the Highlands are, since 1976, part of the large nature reserve Pálava Landscape Protected Area and since 1986 registered by UNESCO as biosphere reserve Dolní Morava.
