= Strachotín =

- Municipality
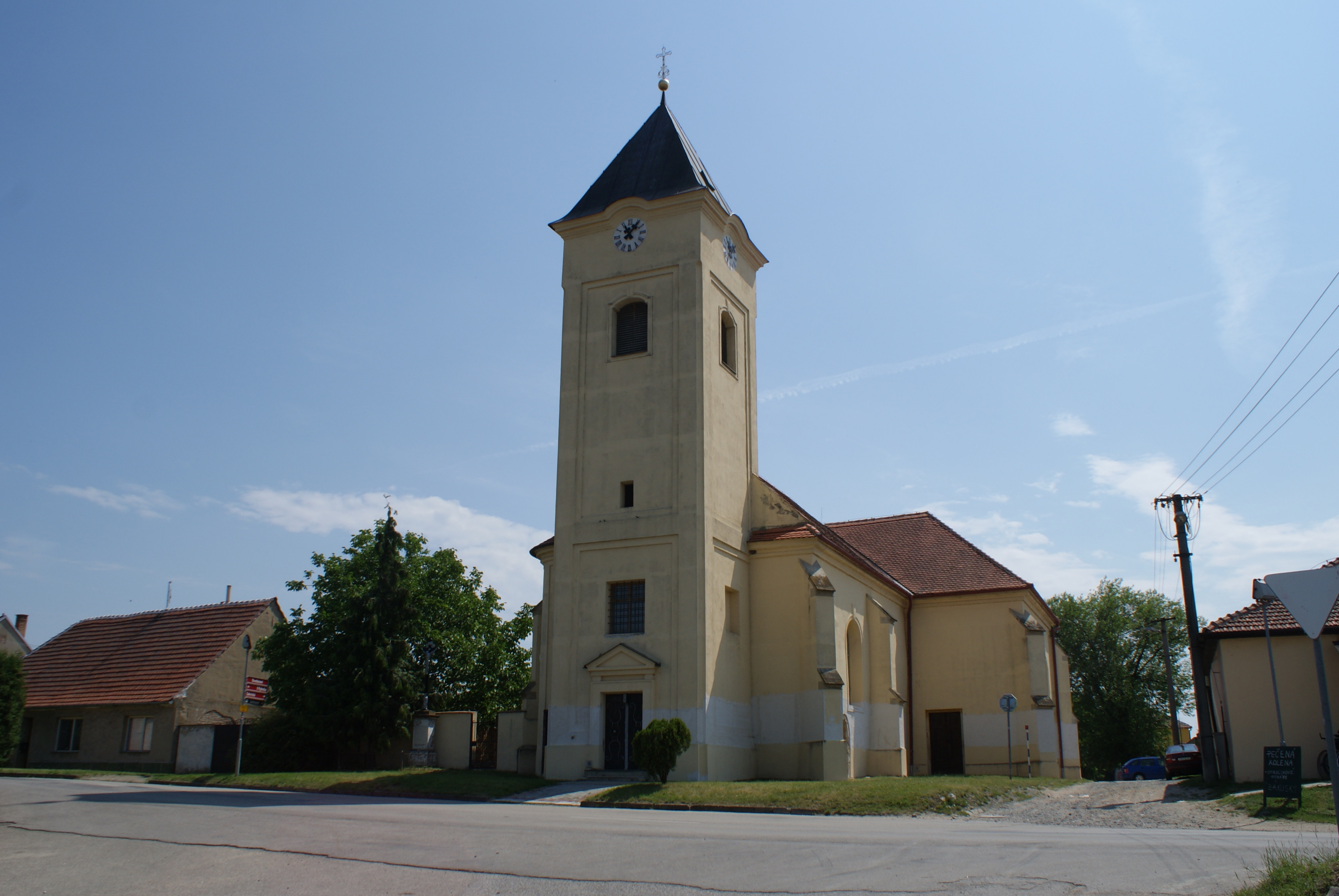
- Church of Saints Ulrich, Cyril and Methodius

- Flag Coat of arms

- Location in the Czech Republic
- Coordinates: 48°54′20″N 16°39′5″E
- Country: Czech Republic
- Region: South Moravian
- District: Břeclav
- First mentioned: 1046

Area
  - Total: 14.14 km^{2} (5.46 sq mi)
- Elevation: 170 m (560 ft)

Population (2026-01-01)
  - Total: 823
  - Density: 58.2/km^{2} (151/sq mi)
- Time zone: UTC+1 (CET)
  - Summer (DST): UTC+2 (CEST)
- Postal code: 693 01
- Website: www.strachotin.cz

Strachotín is a municipality and village in Břeclav District in the South Moravian Region of the Czech Republic. It has about 800 inhabitants.

== Geography ==
Strachotín is located about 23 kilometres (14 mi) northwest of Břeclav and 31 km (19 mi) south of Brno. It lies in the northwestern tip of the Lower Morava Valley. It is situated on the shores of the Nové Mlýny Reservoir and the fishpond Strachotínský rybník.

== History ==
The first written mention of Strachotín is from 1046. In 1334, it was promoted to a market town. During the Thirty Years' War, Strachotín was completely burned down. After World War II, the municipality lost its market town title.

== Demographics ==
Historical population

Year	Pop.	±%
1869	875	—
1880	974	+11.3%
1890	1,127	+15.7%
1900	1,049	−6.9%
1910	1,010	−3.7%

Year	Pop.	±%
1921	1,004	−0.6%
1930	923	−8.1%
1950	789	−14.5%
1961	813	+3.0%
1970	773	−4.9%

Year	Pop.	±%
1980	786	+1.7%
1991	787	+0.1%
2001	765	−2.8%
2011	808	+5.6%
2021	780	−3.5%

Source: Censuses

== Transport ==
There are no railways or major roads passing through the municipality.

== Sights ==
The main landmark of Strachotín is the Church of Saints Ulrich, Cyril and Methodius. It was built in the Renaissance style in 1575, but its core is possibly older. In 1872, the church was rebuilt to its present form. It has many valuable architectural elements in both the exterior and interior.
