= Nové Mlýny reservoirs =

Reservoirs in the Czech Republic

- Czech: Vodní dílo Nové Mlýny
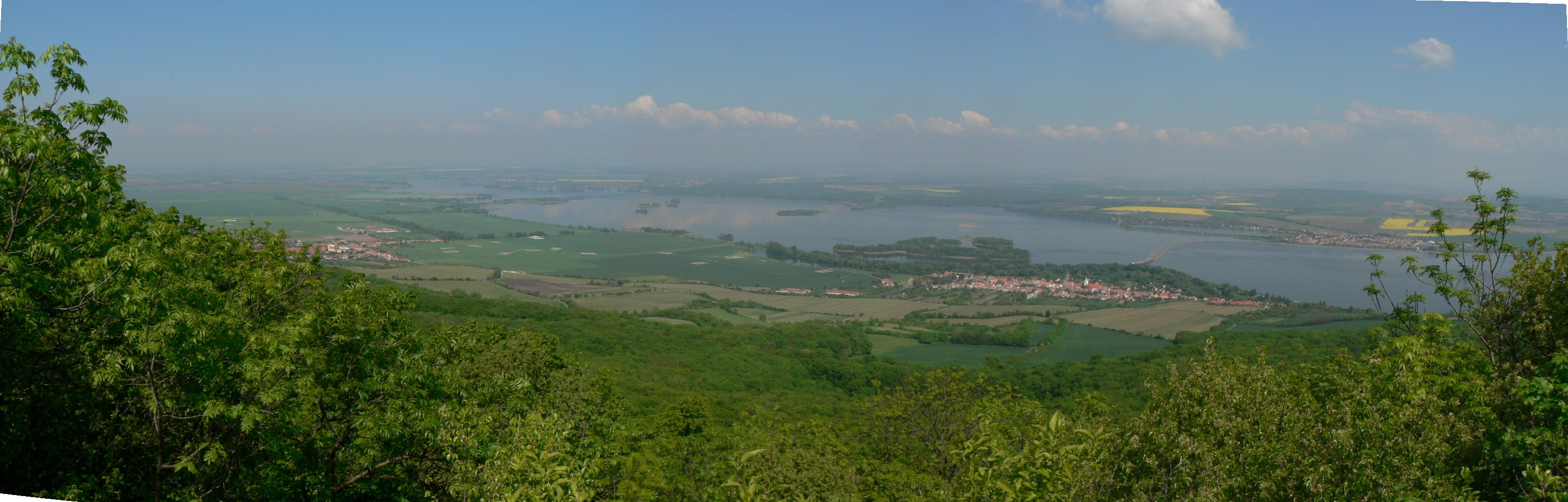
- The view to the reservoir from Děvín

- Location within Czech Republic
- Interactive map of Nové Mlýny reservoirs
- Location: South Moravian Region, Czech Republic
- Coordinates: 48°54′10″N 16°37′15″E
- Type: Reservoir
- Etymology: Mlýny
- Part of: Thaya
- Basin countries: Czech Republic
- Managing agency: PLA Administration Pálava
- Designation: Pálava Protected Landscape Area
- Built: 1978-1988
- Surface area: Novomlýnská: 1,668 ha (4,120 acres); Vestonicka: 1,031 ha (2,550 acres); Mušovská: 528 ha (1,300 acres)
- Max. depth: Novomlýnská: 7.54 m (24.7 ft); Vestonicka: 5.02 m (16.5 ft); Mušovská: 4.04 m (13.3 ft)
- Water volume: Novomlýnská: 87,750,000 m^{3} (3.1×10^{9} cu ft); Vestonicka: 34,000,000 m^{3} (1.2×10^{9} cu ft); Mušovská: 12,186,000 m^{3} (400,000,000 cu ft)
- Surface elevation: 171 m (561 ft)
- References: cs:Vodní dílo Nové Mlýny

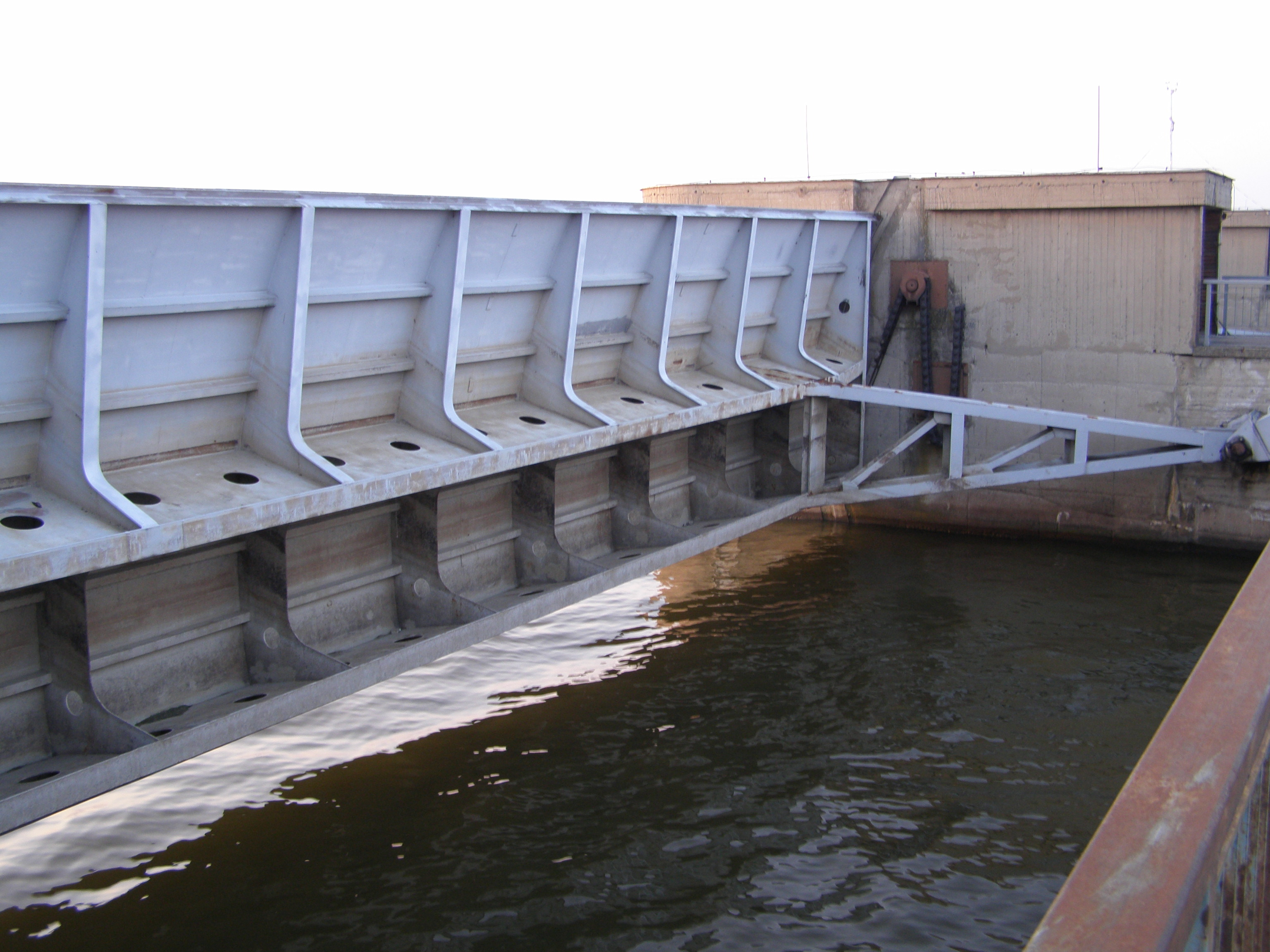
Segments of the second dam

The Nové Mlýny reservoirs (Czech: Vodní dílo Nové Mlýny) are three reservoirs behind the Nové Mlýny Dam on the Thaya River in the Czech Republic. The lower reservoir, 1,668 ha (4,120 acres) in area, is the Novomlýnská (or Nové Mlýny) reservoir, the middle reservoir, 1,031 ha (2,550 acres), is the Věstonice Reservoir and the upper reservoir, 528 ha (1,300 acres), is the Mušovská (or Mušov) Reservoir.

== Construction ==
Built between 1978 and 1988, the three separate reservoirs were built to help lessen the severity of seasonal flooding and to boost agricultural production. The reservoirs are part of the Pálava Protected Landscape Area.
