= Venus of Dolní Věstonice =

Prehistoric ceramic sculpture discovered in Brno, Czech Republic

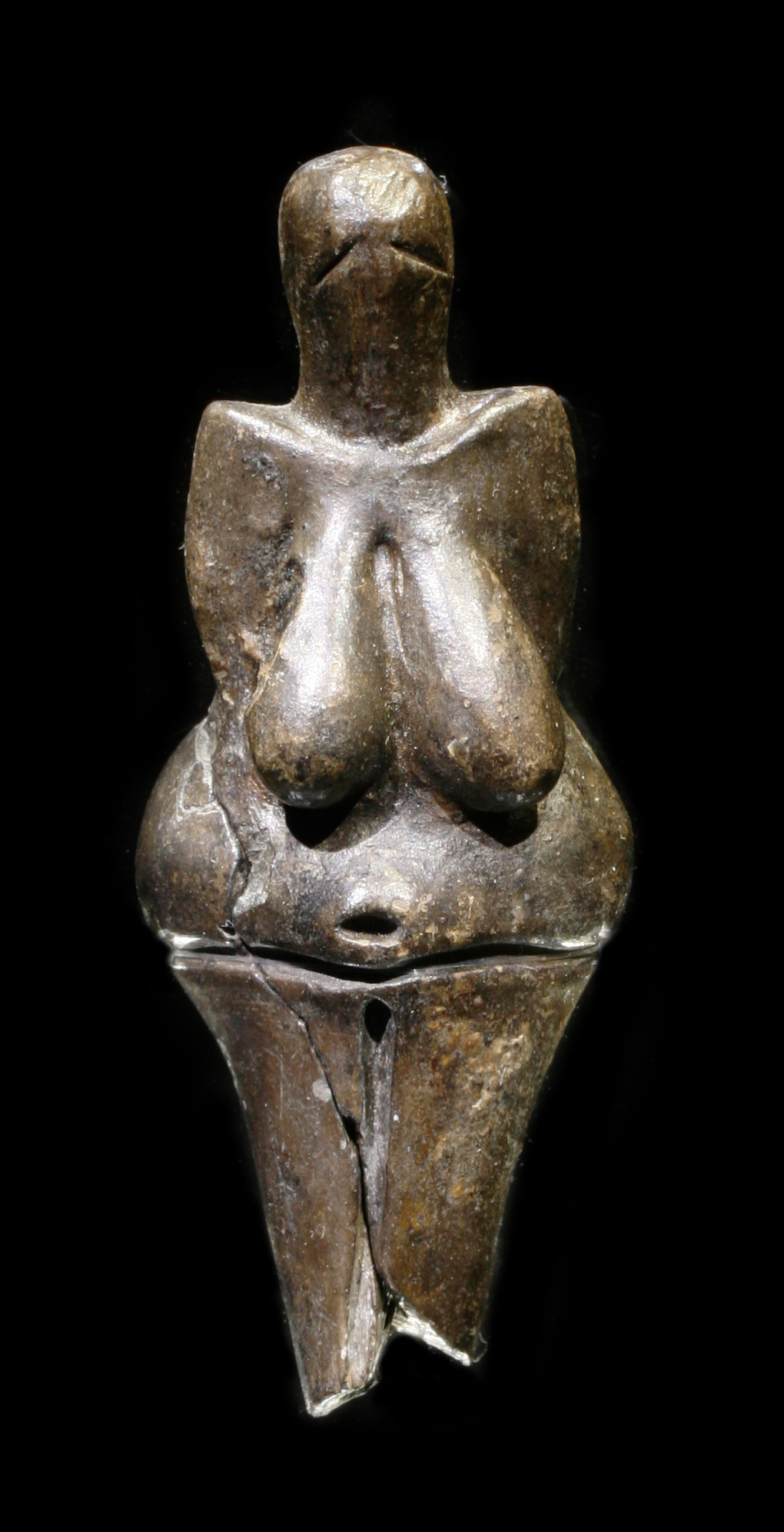
- Material: Ceramic clay
- Height: 11.1 cm
- Width: 4.3 cm
- Created: c. 29,000 years ago
- Discovered: 13 July 1925; Dolní Věstonice, South Moravian Region, Czech Republic
- Present location: Moravské zemské muzeum, Brno, Czech Republic

The Venus of Dolní Věstonice (Czech: Věstonická venuše) is a Venus figurine, a ceramic statuette of a nude female figure dated to 31,000–27,000 years ago (Gravettian industry). It was found at the Paleolithic site Dolní Věstonice south of Brno, in the base of Děvín mountain in what is today the Czech Republic. This figurine and a few others from locations nearby are the oldest known ceramic articles in the world.

== Description ==
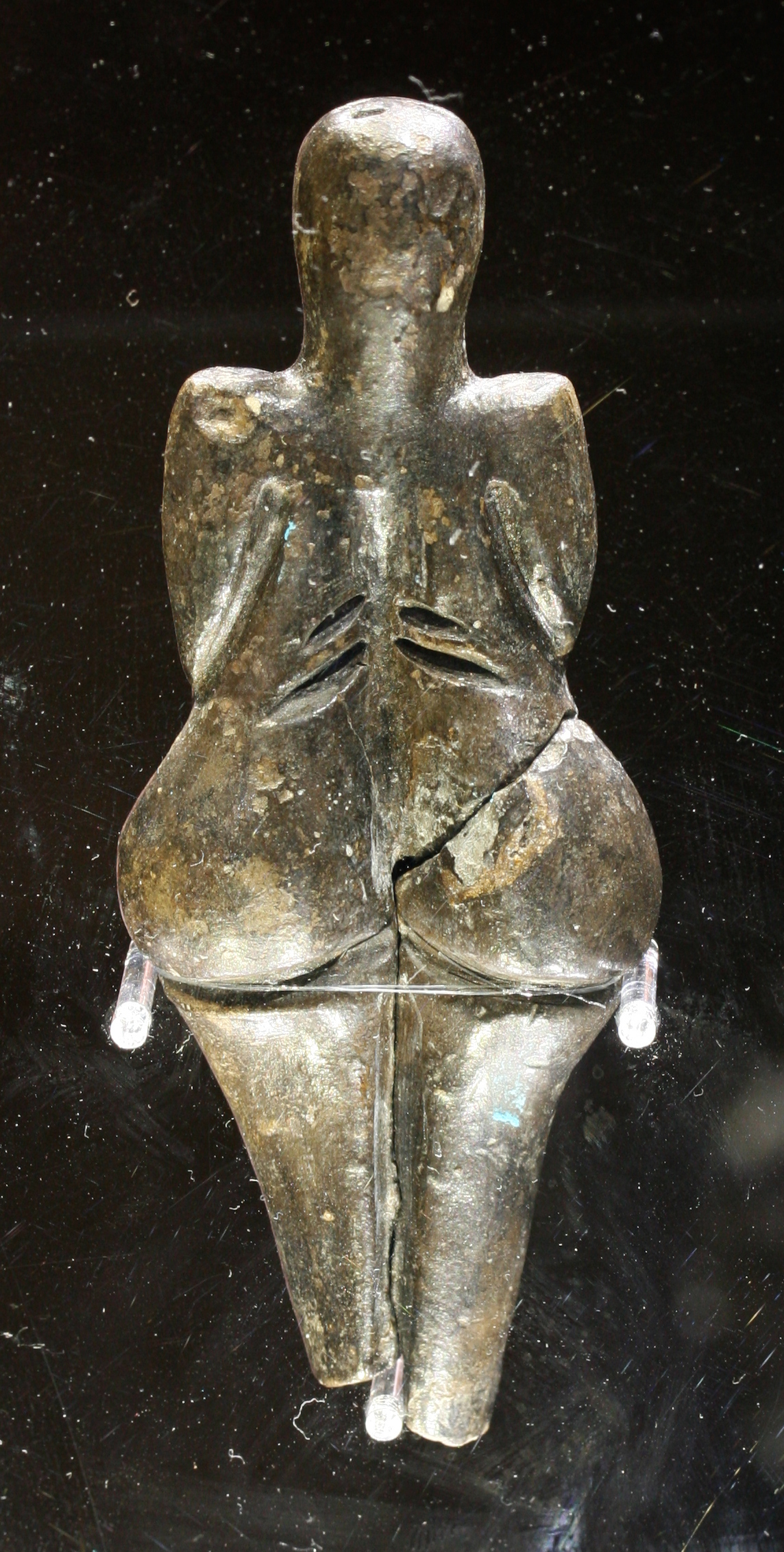
Back

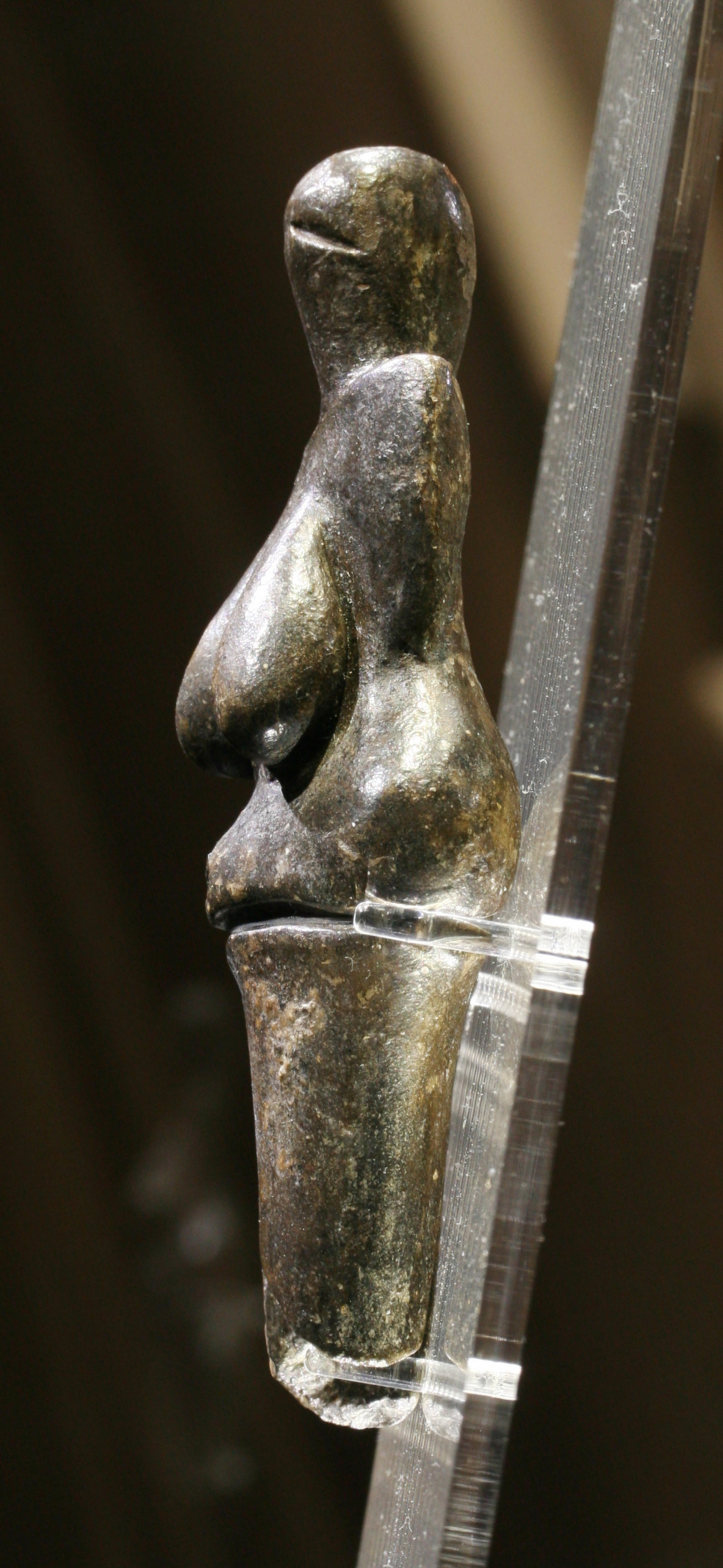
Left side

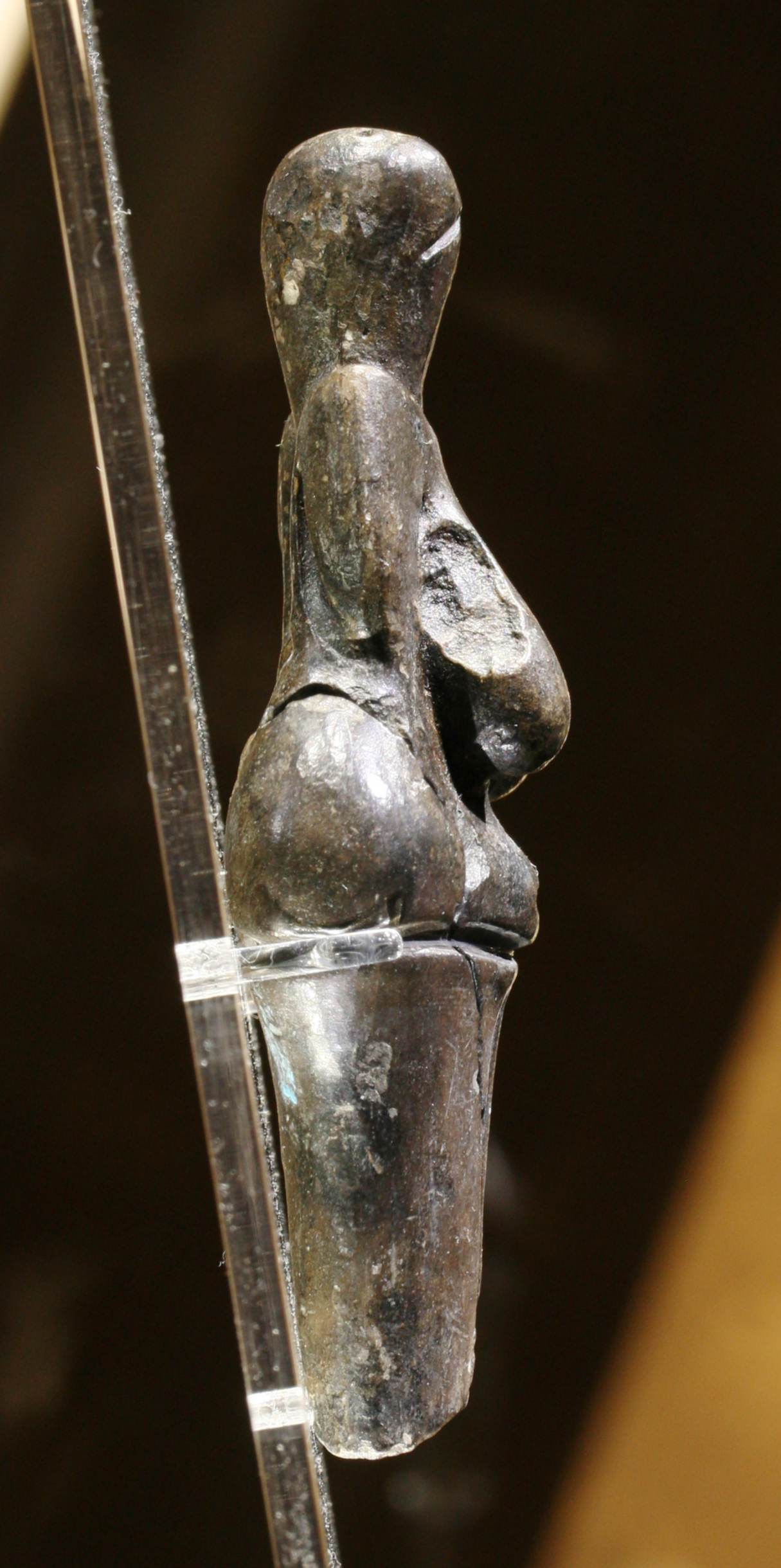
Right side

It has a height of 111 millimetres (4.4 in), and a width of 43 millimetres (1.7 in) at its widest point and is made of a clay body fired at a relatively low temperature (500–800 °C). The statuette follows the general morphology of the other Venus figurines: exceptionally large breasts, belly, and hips, perhaps symbols of fertility, and little detail on the rest of the body. A feature which no longer remains a part of the sculpture, is the fact that it is thought to have been originally ornamented with four feathers. This is evidenced by the four small holes on the top of the head. Though the type of feather is unknown, the holes were carved into the unfired clay with a tool that is relatively sharp, like the quill of a feather.

== History ==
The palaeolithic settlement of Dolní Věstonice in Moravia, a part of Czechoslovakia at the time organized excavation began, now located in the Czech Republic, has been under systematic archaeological research since 1924, initiated by Karel Absolon. In addition to the Venus figurine, figures of animals – bear, lion, mammoth, horse, fox, rhino, and owl – and more than 2,000 balls of burnt clay have been found at Dolní Věstonice.

The figurine was discovered on 13 July 1925 in a layer of ash, broken into two pieces. It was found situated in a central fireplace. Once on display at the Moravian Museum in Brno, it is now protected and only rarely accessible to the public. It was exhibited in the National Museum in Prague from 11 October 2006 until 2 September 2007 as a part of the exhibition Lovci mamutů (The Mammoth Hunters). It was presented in the Moravian Museum in Brno at an expo "Prehistoric Art in Central Europe". It has returned to depository as of June 2009.

Scientists occasionally examine the statuette. A tomograph scan in 2004 found a fingerprint of a child estimated at between 7 and 15 years of age, fired into the surface; the child who handled the figurine before it was fired is considered by Králík, Novotný, and Martin Oliva to be an unlikely candidate for its maker.

In 2025, the 100th anniversary of its discovery has been commemorated i.e. by the decision to place a silhouette of the figurine on a scientific instrument built by a consortium of companies from Brno for the European Space Agency (ESA) space probe EnVision that will explore the planet Venus.

== Manufacture ==
=== Raw materials ===
The primary constituent was local loess, a fine-grained, wind-blown silt common to the Moravian landscape. To transform this earth into a viable medium for sculpture, it was mixed with water and a specific tempering agent to enhance structural integrity. Detailed microscopic and chemical analyses have identified this temper as powdered animal bone, which had been charred prior to grinding.

=== Shaping ===
The fabrication of the figurine involved a sophisticated additive technique, where the body was constructed from two primary segments of prepared paste. The artisan joined these pieces to form the torso and head, while the breasts and tapered legs were fashioned separately and luted onto the main structure. Surface details were achieved through both incision and impression; the characteristic slanted eyes were carved using a sharp flint tool, and a small hole was at the crown of the head, possibly intended to hold a decorative organic element. The presence of a small fingerprint, identified through tomographic scanning as belonging to a child approximately ten years of age, suggests that the shaping process occurred in a communal or domestic setting where multiple members of the group were present during its shaping..

=== Firing ===
Its firing likely used a communal hearth designed to reach temperatures between 500°C and 800°C. This process induced a permanent alteration in the loess-bone mixture, resulting in a hardened, water-resistant ceramic. The archaeological context at Dolní Věstonice suggests that firing may have served a ritualistic or "performance" function; thousands of ceramic fragments found at the site appear to have been intentionally thermal-shocked to cause them to shatter in the fire.

== See also ==
- Art of the Upper Paleolithic
- List of Stone Age art
- Venus of Hohle Fels
- Venus of Petřkovice
- Venus of Willendorf
