= Dolní Věstonice (archaeological site) =

Archaeological site in the Czech Republic

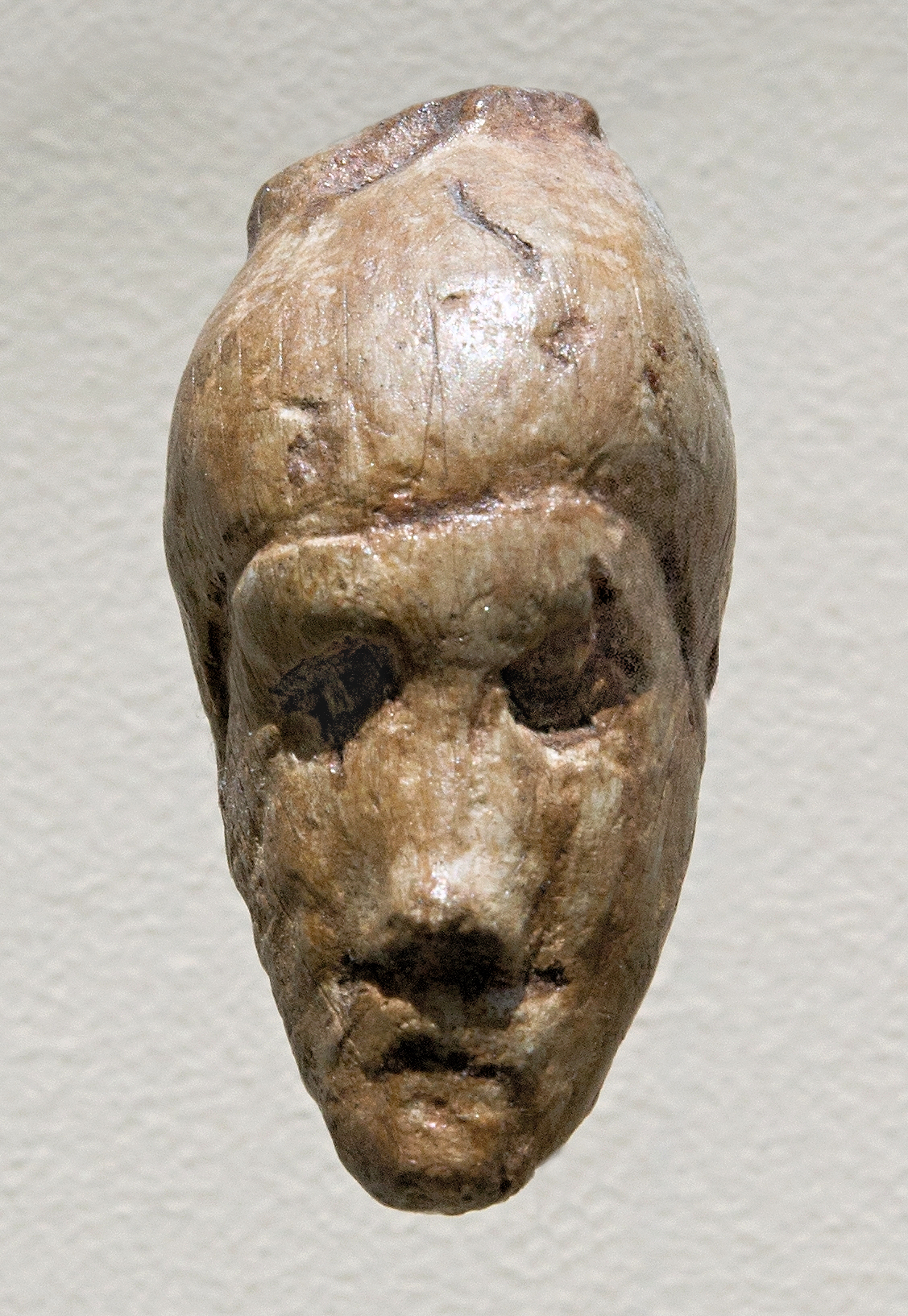
- Female face, carved ivory, Dolní Věstonice, Gravettian, c. 26,000 BP

- Location of Dolní Věstonice Dolní Věstonice (archaeological site) (Czech Republic)
- 48°52′40″N 16°39′8″E
- Cultures: Gravettian
- Associated with: Homo sapiens

Dolní Věstonice (often without diacritics as Dolni Vestonice) is an Upper Paleolithic archaeological site near the village of Dolní Věstonice in the South Moravian Region of the Czech Republic, at the base of Mount Děvín, 550 metres (1,800 ft). It dates to approximately 26,000 BP, as supported by radiocarbon dating. The site is unique in that it has been a particularly abundant source of prehistoric artifacts (especially art) dating from the Gravettian period, which spanned roughly from 27,000 to 20,000 BC. In addition to the abundance of art, this site also includes carved representations of men, women, and animals, along with personal ornaments, human burials and enigmatic engravings.

Excavations of the site began in 1924 and yielded thousands of ceramic artifacts. Many of these artifacts depicted animals, such as lions, rhinoceroses, and mammoths, molded in the clay. These figurines have been interpreted to have been of some ceremonial significance to the ancient occupants of the site. Two figurines depicting women were found—among them the Venus of Dolní Věstonice—along with a woman's skeleton.

== History ==
=== Organization of living space ===
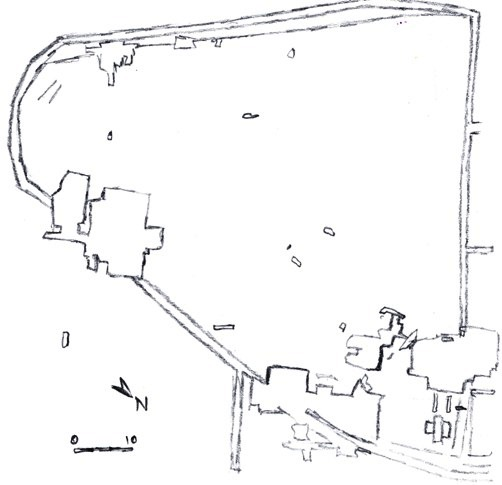
Sitemap of Dolní Věstonice 1 and 2

Dolní Věstonice is an open-air site located along a stream. Its people hunted mammoths and other herd animals, saving mammoth and other bones that could be used to construct a fence-like boundary, separating the living space into a distinct inside and outside. In this way, the perimeter of the site would be easily distinguishable. At the center of the enclosure was a large bonfire and huts were grouped together within the barrier of the bone fence.

=== Tally stick ===
The so-called Wolf bone is a prehistoric artifact discovered in 1937 during excavations led by Karel Absolon. Dated to the Aurignacian, approximately 30,000 years ago, the bone is marked with 55 marks which some believe to be tally marks. The head of an ivory Venus figurine was excavated close to the bone.

=== Dugout ===
At an isolated site 80 meters upstream lies a lean-to shelter dug into an embankment. An estimated 2,300 clay figurines of various animals were found in and around the remains of a kiln. It may be one of the first instances of a covered oven, hot enough to fire clay. Most of the figurines were broken and found in fragments. General consensus agrees that they were likely intentionally and perhaps ritualistically broken, but offers no conclusive reason. One hypothesis posits that these figurines had magical significance, and were intentionally fashioned from wet clay so that they would explode when fired.

=== Female figurines ===
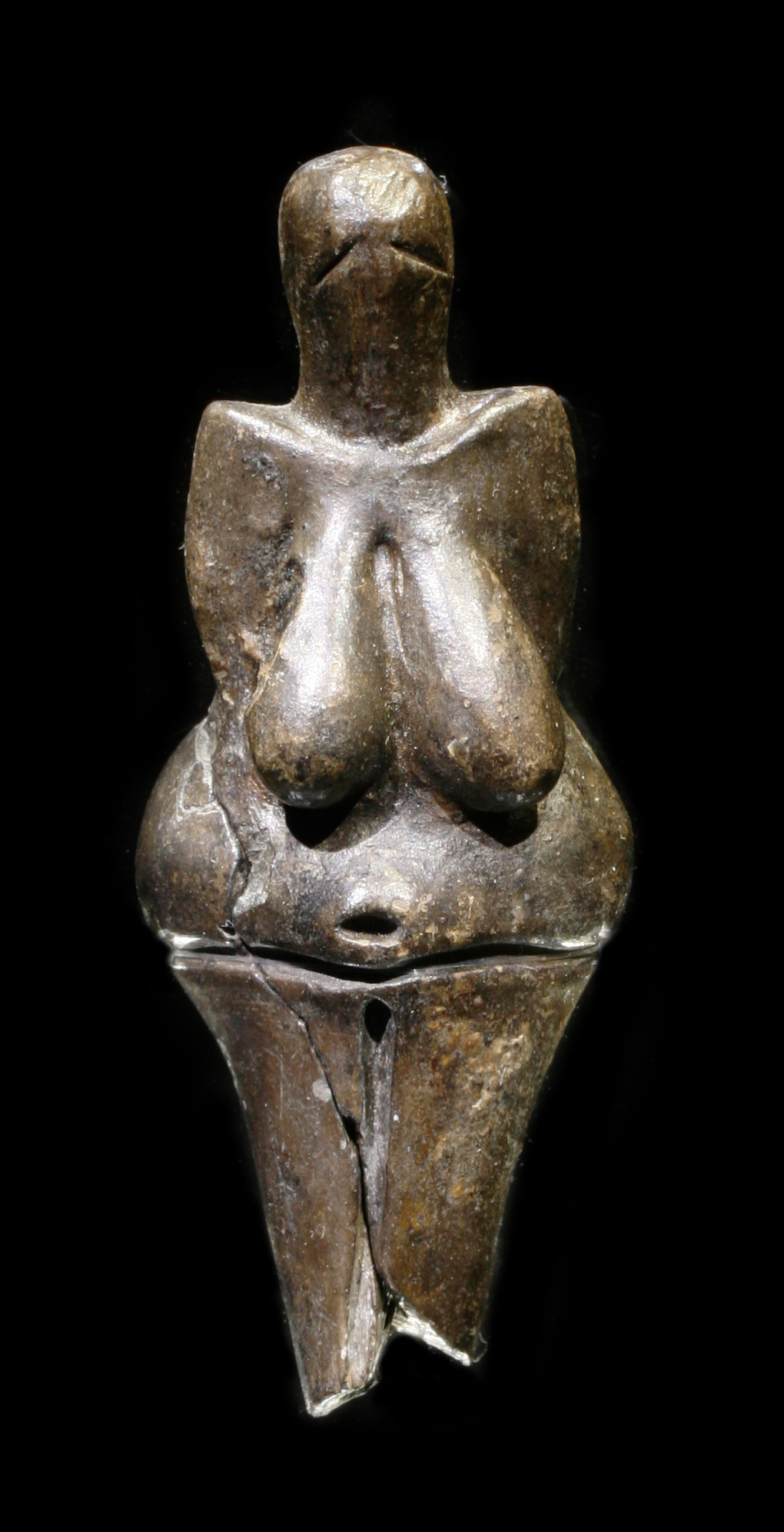
Venus of Dolní Věstonice (31,000–27,000 BP, Gravettian industry)

The Dolní Věstonice artifacts also include some of the earliest examples of fired clay sculptures, including the Venus of Dolní Věstonice, and date back to 26,000 BP. The female figurine is a ceramic statuette depiction of a wide-hipped, nude female. This figurine is similar to other figurines found throughout the area at nearby archaeological sites such as Willendorf and the Caves of Grimaldi (see Grimaldi Man). In 2004, a tomograph scan of the figurine showed a fingerprint of a child who must have handled it before it was fired. A majority of the ceramic figurines at Dolní Věstonice were found around either the dugout or the central fire pit located within the site.

=== Carved ivory figure of young man ===
Particularly striking is a sculpture which may represent the first example of portraiture (i.e., representation of a specific person). The majority of anthropomorphic figures on this site bear no distinct facial features, but this figure, carved in mammoth ivory and roughly three inches high, appears to be modeled after a young man with heavy bone structure, thick, long hair reaching past his shoulders, and possibly traces of a beard. Originally found in 1891, there was concern that the finding might be a hoax. Particle spectrometry analysis conducted at the University of Kansas Space Technology Center placed the date of the carved surface of the ivory at around 26,000 BP. This sculpture was featured on the cover of National Geographic in October 1988, with the sub-headline: "Oldest realistic human portrait?"

=== Carved ivory figure of elder ===
A carved ivory figure in the shape of a female head was discovered near the huts. The left side of the figure's face was distorted.

=== Description of elder's burial ===
One of the burials, located near the huts, revealed a human female skeleton aged to 40+ years old, ritualistically placed beneath a pair of mammoth scapulae, one leaning against the other. Surprisingly, the left side of the skull was disfigured in the same manner as the aforementioned carved ivory figure, indicating that the figure was an intentional depiction of this specific individual. The bones and the earth surrounding the body contained traces of red ochre, a flint spearhead had been placed near the skull, and one hand held the body of a fox. This evidence suggests that this was the burial site of a shaman. This is the oldest site not only of ceramic figurines and artistic portraiture, but also of evidence of female shamans.

=== Burial of three individuals ===
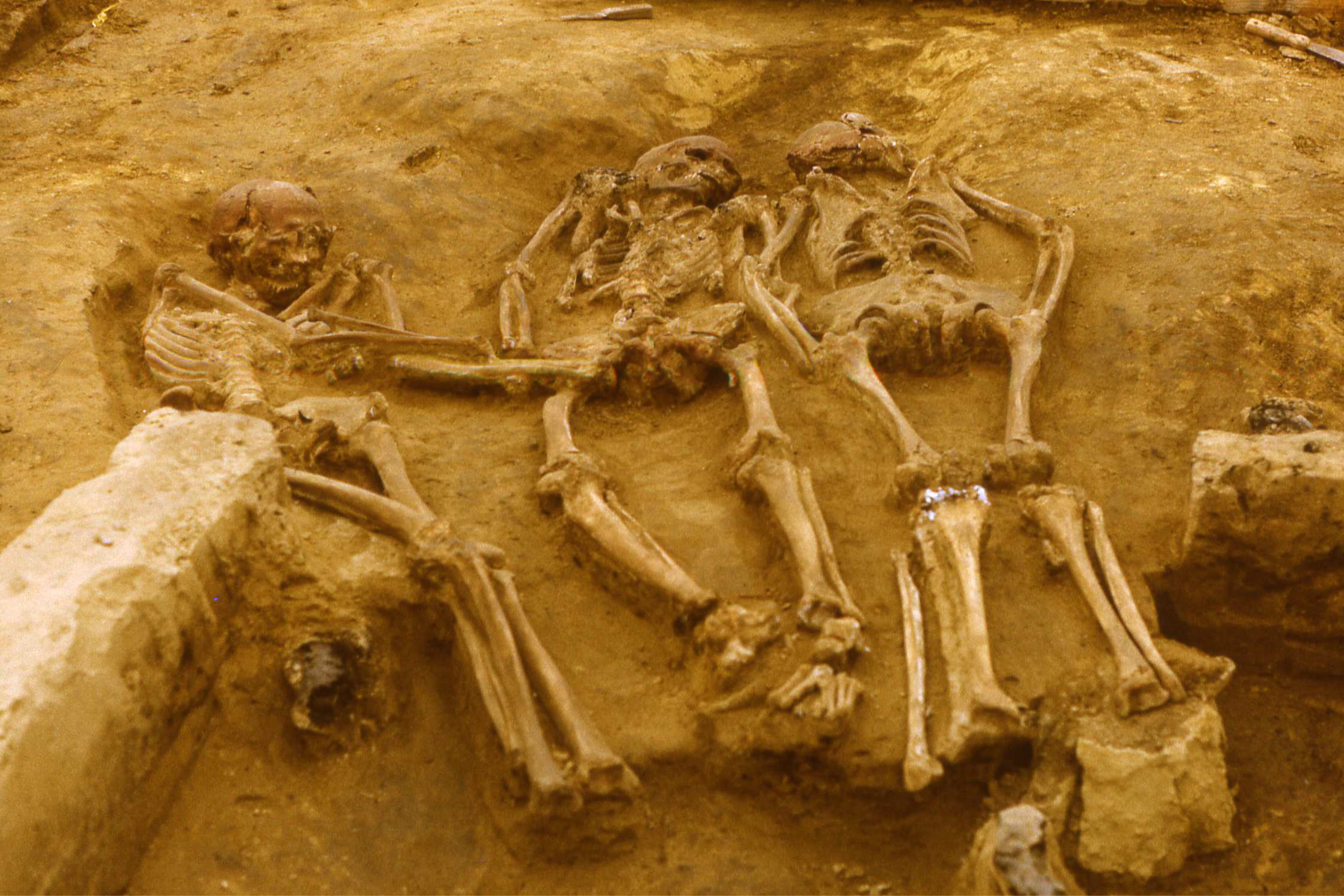
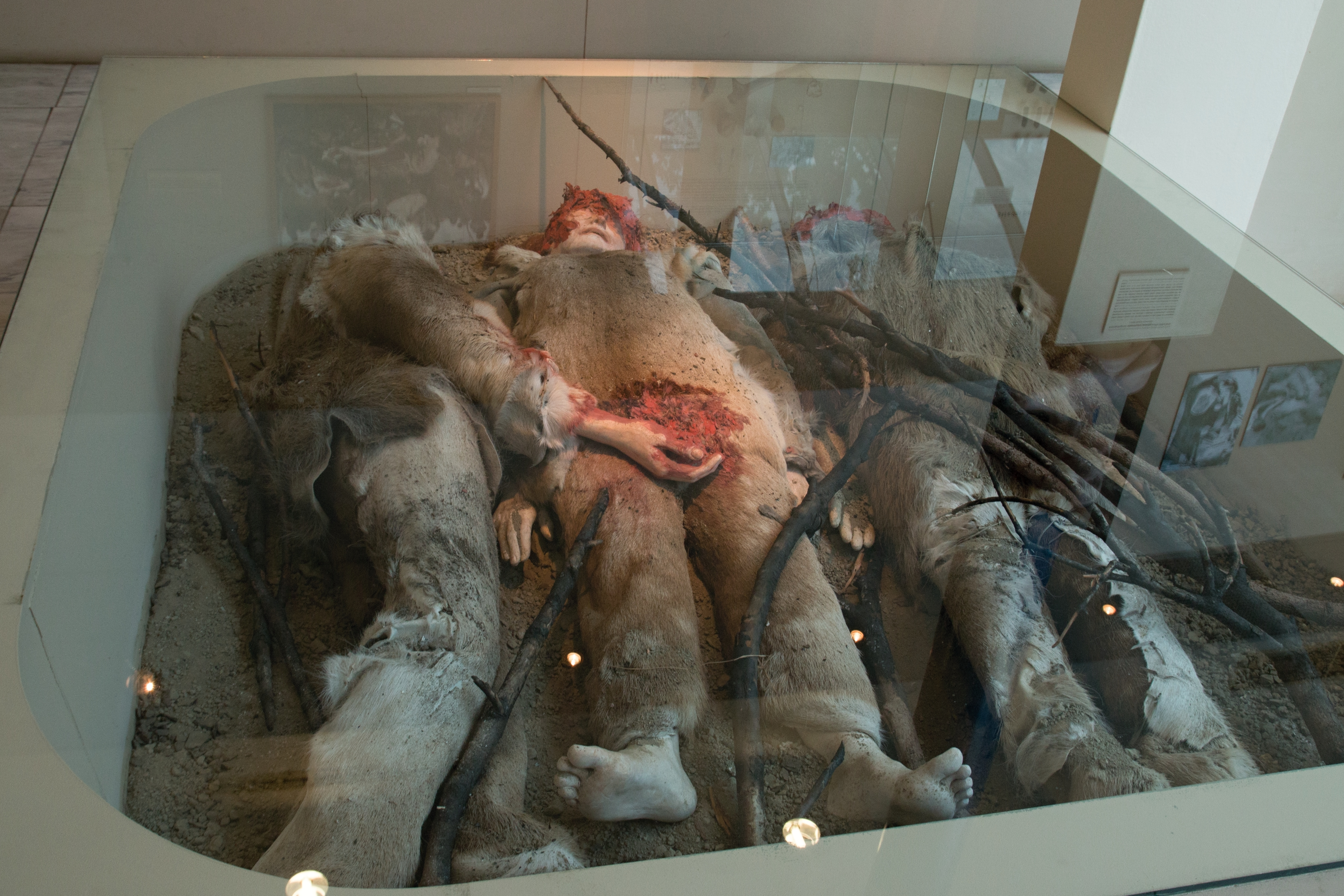
Dolni Vestonice, burial of DV13-DV14-DV15 individuals, with reconstruction

During an excavation at the site in 1986, a well-preserved triple burial was unearthed. The site is dated to be 28 kya. The remains of three male individuals were found. It was initially believed that the middle of the three bodies was a female, but DNA evidence proved the body was a male, as published in 2016. The bodies were lying in an extended lengthwise position, covered by burnt spruce logs and branches. The body in the middle was placed first, being partially covered by the other two. The other two were in different positions. One was faced down and the other on his side with hands reaching the pubic region of the middle body. The heads of all three were covered with red ochre, the central body also having red ochre around his pubis. All three individuals are theorized to be related based on three rare traits: unilateral absence of the frontal sinus, specific auditory exostosis, and impaction of the upper wisdom teeth. Each individual is believed to be about 16–25 years old at the time of death. The central body suffers from a genetic pathology resulting in the curved form of his legs. Red ochre, a pigment commonly used for rituals, was found over the pelvis.

=== Textiles ===
Imprints of textiles pressed into clay were found at the site. Evidence from several sites in the Czech Republic indicate that the weavers of Upper Palaeolithic were using a variety of techniques that enabled them to produce plaited basketry, nets, and sophisticated twined and plain woven cloth.

== Interpretation ==
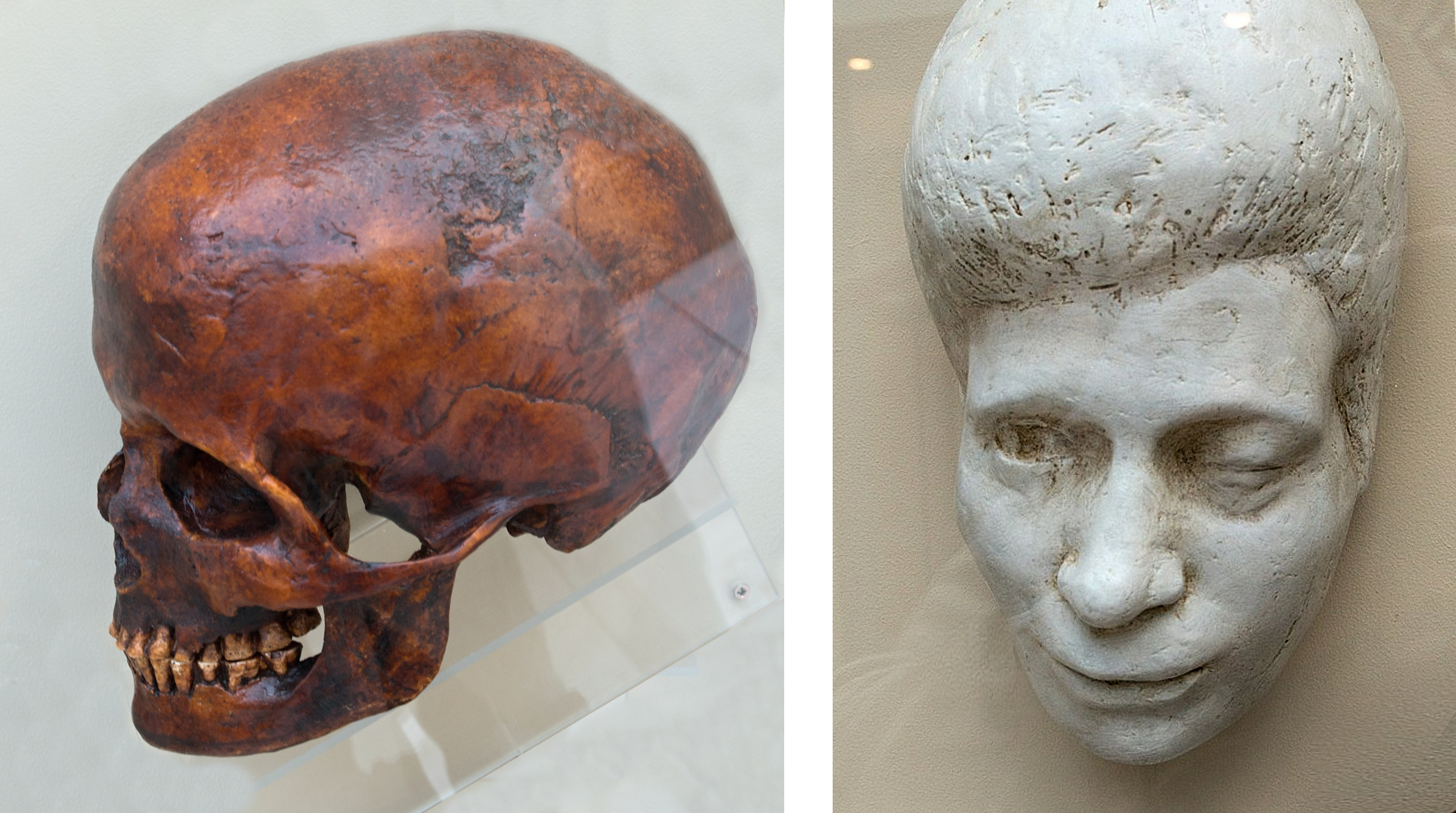
Cranium and forensic reconstruction

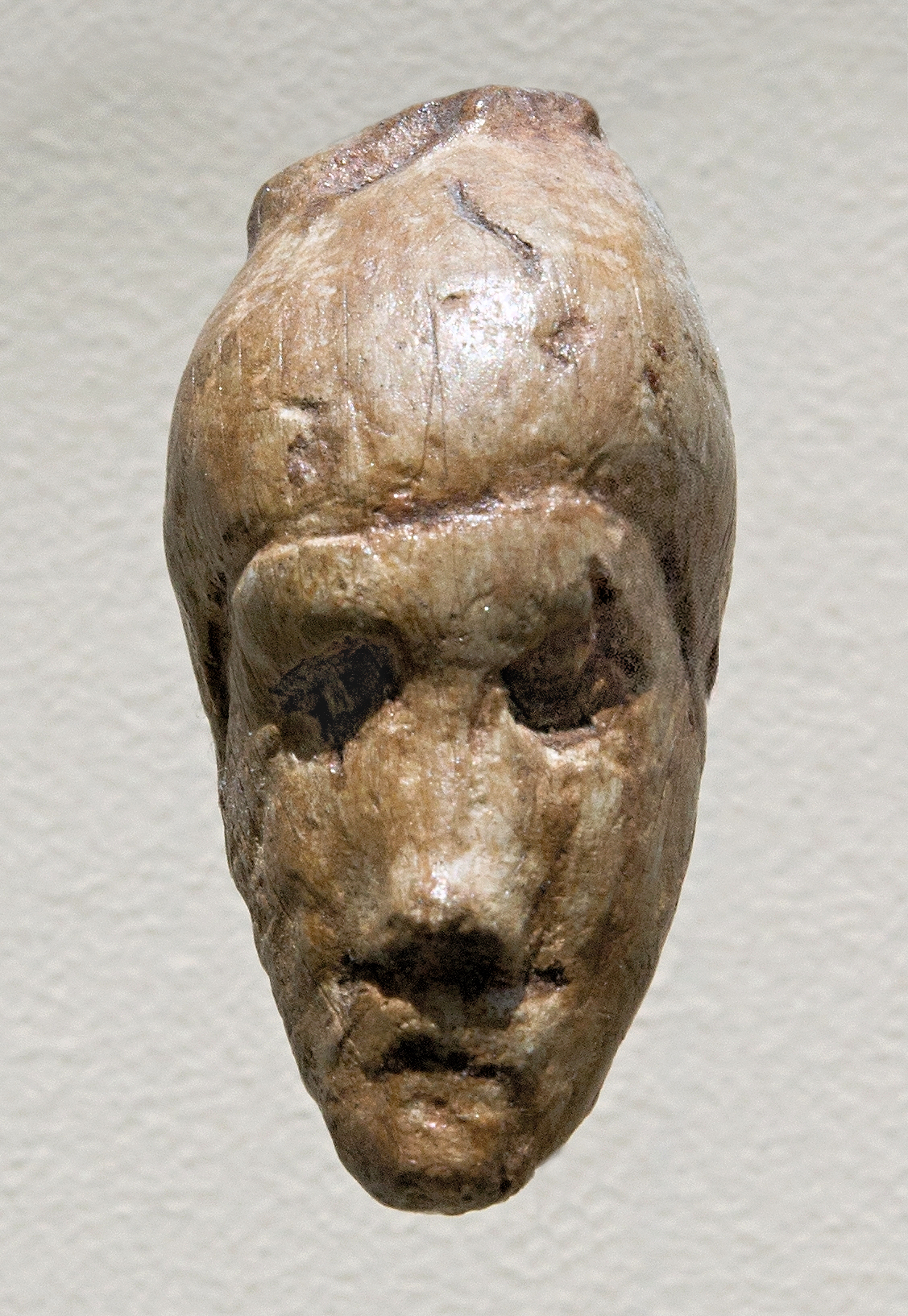
Statuette

Forensic reconstruction from cranial remains of the face of the woman from Dolní Věstonice (center), and depiction of what is believed to be the same woman in a statuette from the same site, dated c.26,000 BP (right).

A burial of an approximately forty-year-old woman was found at Dolní Věstonice in an elaborate burial setting. Various items found with the woman have had a profound impact on the interpretation of the social hierarchy of the people at the site, as well as indicating an increased lifespan for these inhabitants. The remains were covered in red ochre, a compound known to have religious significance, indicating that this woman's burial was ceremonial in nature. Also, the inclusion of a mammoth scapula and a fox are indicative of a high-status burial.

In the Upper Paleolithic, anatomically modern humans began living longer, often reaching middle age, by today's standards. Rachel Caspari argues that life expectancy increased during the Upper Paleolithic in Europe. She also describes why elderly people were highly influential in society. Grandparents assisted in childcare, perpetuated cultural transmission, and contributed to the increased complexity of stone tools. The woman found at Dolní Věstonice was old enough to have been a grandparent. Although human lifespans were increasing, elderly individuals in Upper Paleolithic societies were still relatively rare. Because of this, it is possible that the woman was attributed with great importance and wisdom, and revered because of her age. Because of her advanced age, it is also possible she had a decreased ability to care for herself, instead relying on her family group to care for her, which indicates strong social connections.

Furthermore, a female figurine was found at the site and is believed to be associated with the aged woman, because of remarkably similar facial characteristics. The woman was found to have deformities on the left side of her face. The special importance accorded with her burial, in addition to her facial deformity, makes it possible that she was a shaman in this time period, where it was "not uncommon that people with disabilities, either mental or physical, are thought to have unusual supernatural powers" (Pringle 2010).

In 1981, Patricia Rice studied a multitude of female clay figurines found at Dolní Věstonice, believed to represent fertility in this society. She challenged this assumption by analyzing all the figurines and found that, "it is womanhood, rather than motherhood that is symbolically recognized or honored" (Rice 1981: 402). This interpretation challenged the widely held assumption that all prehistoric female figurines were created to honor fertility.

== Archaeogenetics ==
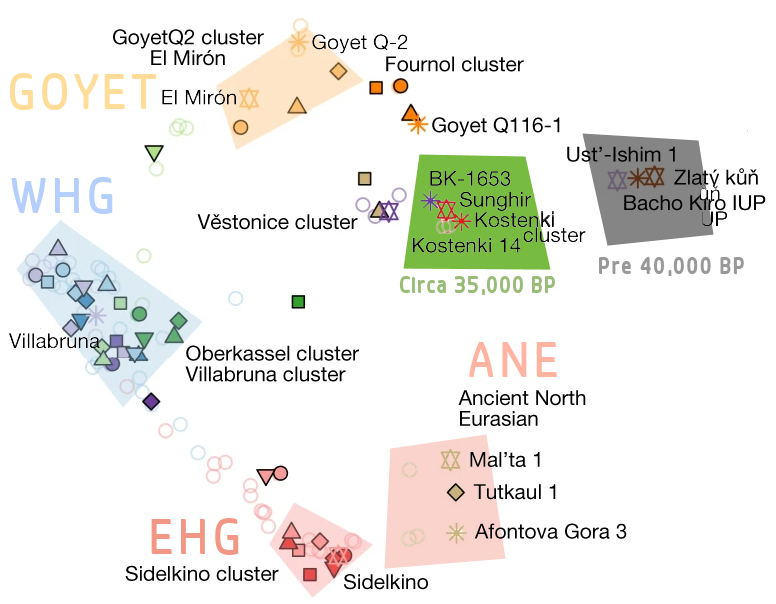
Genetic position of the Věstonice cluster among other ancient Eurasian hunter-gatherers (PCA)

Three inhabitants of Dolní Věstonice, lived 31,155 years ago (calibrated date) and were found to have mitochondrial haplogroup U, and one inhabitant mitochondrial haplogroup U8.

The Věstonice individuals form a distinct genetic cluster which is the result of an admixture between 'Western' and 'Eastern' lineages, represented by the genomes of the c. 35,000 year-old Goyet Q116-1 individual from Belgium and the c. 34,000 year-old Sunghir individuals from Western Russia, respectively. The Věstonice individuals show greater affinity to the Sunghir individuals than to the Goyet Q116-1 individual, and can be modelled as approximately 64% Sunghir-related and 36% Goyet-Q116-related ancestry.

The Y-chromosome observed among Vestonice 16 belonged to haplogroup C1a2 (V20+, V86+). In the Vestonice 13 sample, the Y chromosomal haplogroup CT (not IJK-L16) (CTS109+, CTS5318+, CTS6327+, CTS8243+, CTS9556+, Z17718+, Y1571+, M5831+) was determined, for the Vestonice 14 sample, the Y chromosome haplogroup I (L758+), for the Vestonice 15 sample, the Y chromosome haplogroup BT (PF1178+), and for the Vestonice 43 sample, the Y chromosome haplogroup F (not I) (P145+, P158+).
