= Děvín =

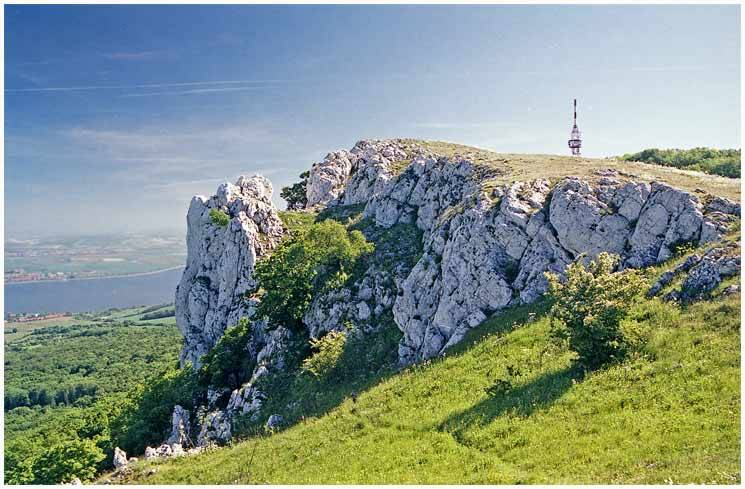
- Summit limestone rock

Highest point
- Elevation: 550 m (1,800 ft)
- Prominence: 300 m
- Isolation: 49.3 km (30.6 mi)
- Coordinates: 48°52′10″N 16°38′59″E

Geography
- Location within Czech Republic
- Location: Pavlov, Czech Republic
- Parent range: Pavlov Hills, Mikulov Highlands

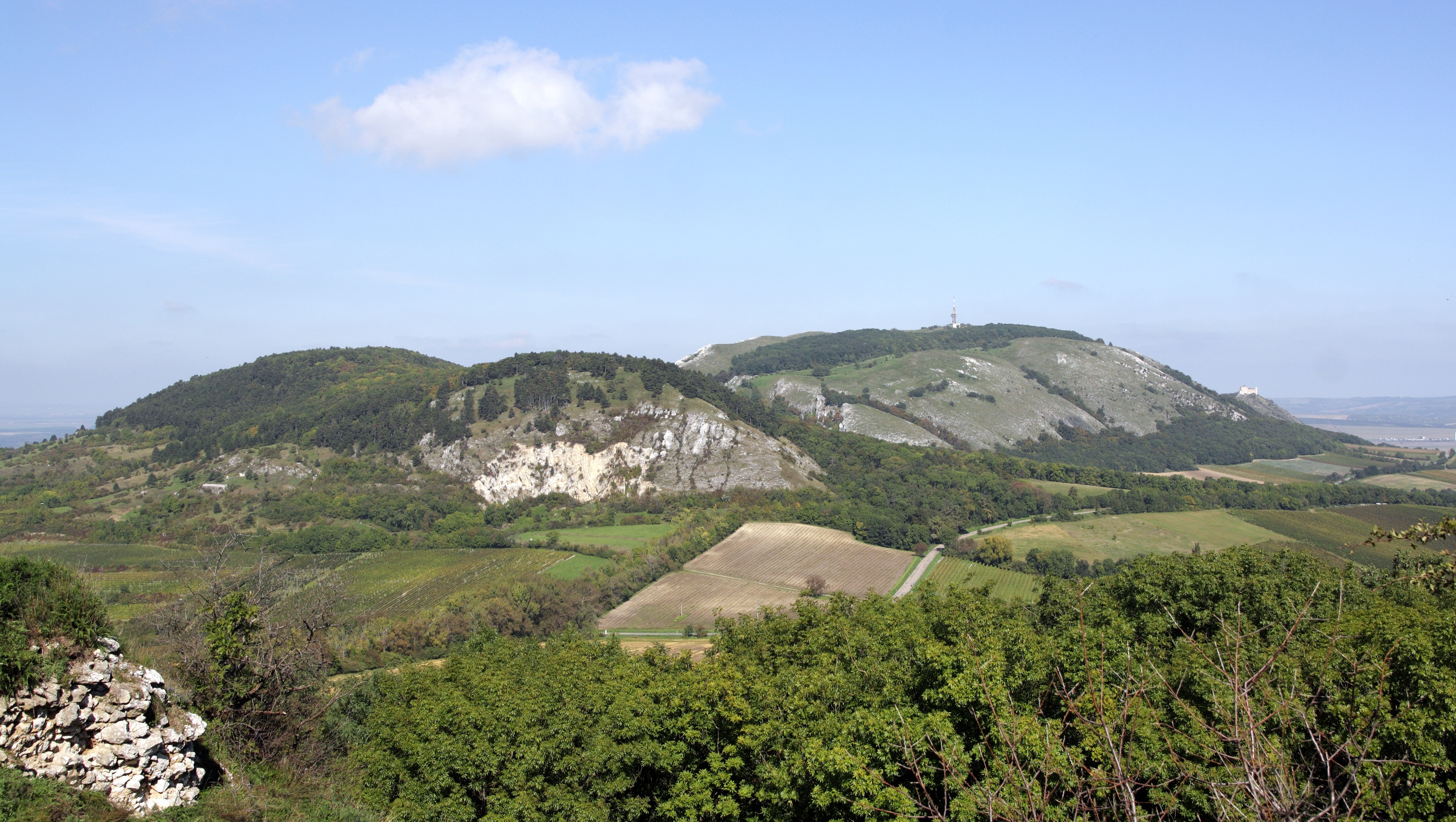
Landscape silhouette of the Děvín Massif from west

Děvín (German: Mayden Berg) is a double peak mountain in the Pavlov municipality in the South Moravian Region of the Czech Republic. With an elevation of 550 metres (1,800 ft), it is the highest mountain of the Pavlov Hills within the Mikulov Highlands, and of the Pálava Protected Landscape Area.

It is located right on trace where runs line of drainage divide of Upper Thaya drainage and Thaya/Morava meso-level drainage.

== History ==
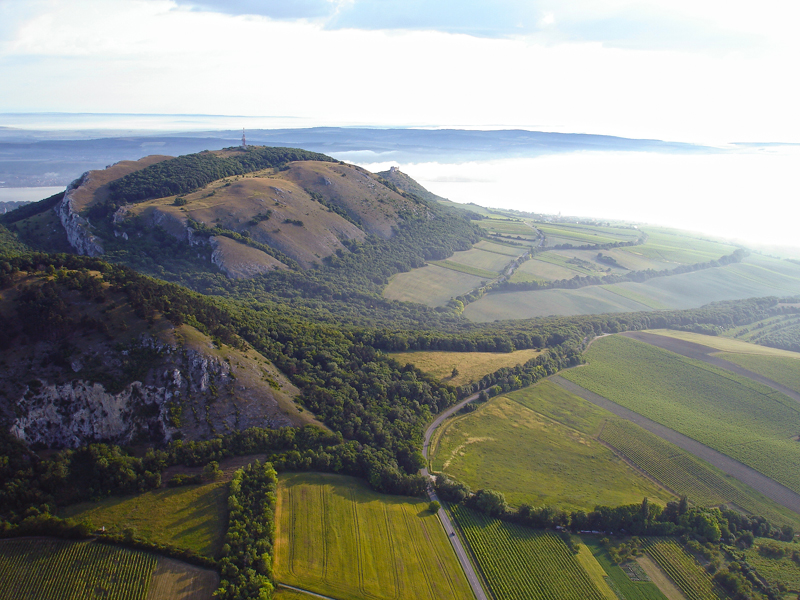
Aerial view of Děvín Hill in light fog

The summit of Děvín has the remains of a huge Iron Age hill fort, while the ancient Amber Route runs neighbors of the mountains base, and all archaic roads in landscape, originally created by animals and later overtaken by humans. The area around base of the mountain is permanently settled longer than last 30,000 years. By Cromagnons, Celtic tribes, a Roman fortress, and Great Moravian hillforts (Strachotín and Děvín).

== Geology ==
The entire Děvín massif consists mainly by Jurassic limestone, i.e. series of rocks generated during sedimentation.

The body of the Děvín is strongly modulated, with outcrops and cliffs (klippe/crag) of pure, hard and white limestone of Later Jurassic origin, called Ernstbrunn limestone. Sedimentation of Ernstbrunn limestone was preceded by the sedimentation of grey calcareous Děvín-Kotel massif.

Děvín claystone and clay limestone, called Klentnice layers. All the Pavlov Hills are situated at the margin of the flysch zone of the Northern Limestone Alps and Western Carpathians (South moravian carpathians). The flysch beds consist of strongly folded Lower Tertiary claystone, sandstone and conglomerate. During the periods of orogenetic activity in the Tertiary, large blocks of Jurassic and Early Cretaceous rocks were torn from their Jurassic base (now situated more lower - up to 2 km below the surface), and re-deposited over the younger flysch beds.

In the Lower Badenian period (Upper Tertiary), the Pavlov Hills were surrounded by a warm sea. Pieces of Jurassic rock present in the littoral gravel from that period indicate that limestone may have been already denuded at that time. At 15 Ma BP (before present) a strong subsidence formed the Vienna Basin. During the following 9 Ma, up to 3 km thick layers of maritime and lacustrine sediments were deposited on its bottom.

== Flora ==
Děvín as a whole eastern part of the Mikulov Highlands lies in the northwest promontory of the Panonian plain. It is the warmest and almost the most arid area in the Czech Republic, and therefore vines are cultivated here. Because of this climate some plant species that do not occur anywhere else in the country grow here. The colourful mosaic of arid rock grass, fringe tree communities, thermophilous bushes and thermophilous oakwoods on the Děvín slopes, which originated partly due to the influence of grazing, is called karst forest steppe. The Děvín forest plateaus are dominated by sparse loess oakwoods together with a species-rich herbaceous layer, while Panonian oak-hornbeam dominates the north-facing slopes and valleys. Riparian forests with pedunculate oaks and narrow-leaved ashes and quite small areas of alluvial meadows have been preserved in the Dyje floodplain in the vicinity of Křivé lake. Remains of halophytic vegetation, which occurred quite commonly on the salinated grazing land in South Moravia, still survive on the western bank of Nesyt pond near Sedlec.

Summit is covered by steppe meadow, pinewood and rock.

== Top ==
A radio and TV transmitter is situated on the top. The lower platform is used as an observation tower. It was built in 1979–1980.

== Gallery ==
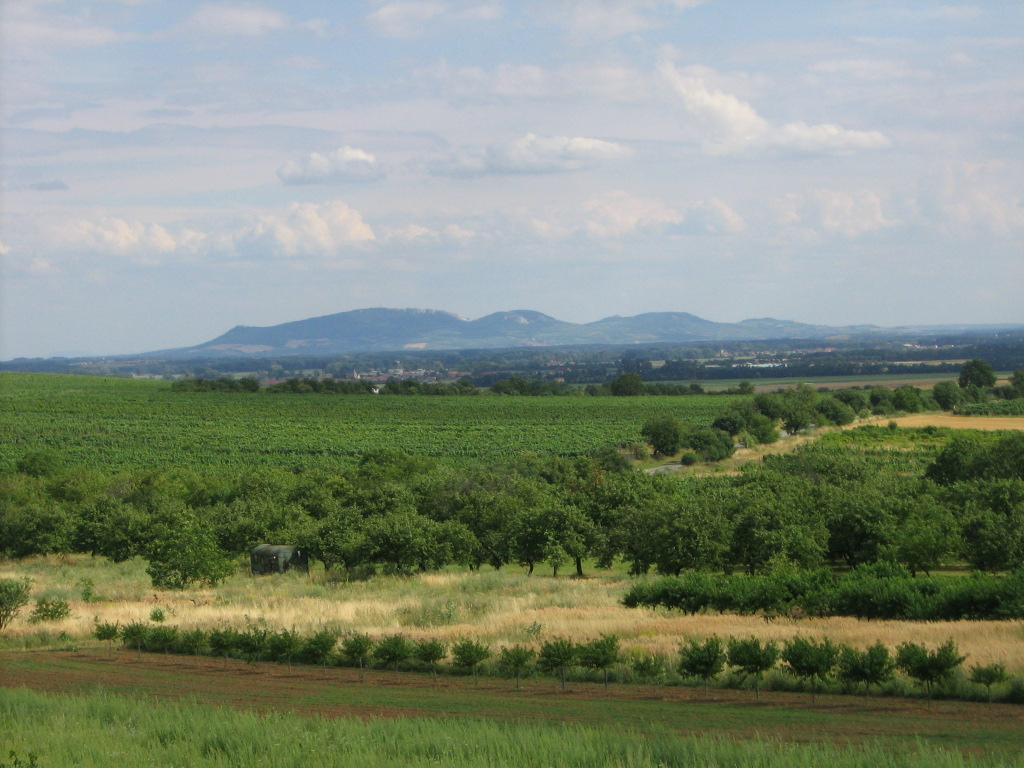
View from Dolní Kounice

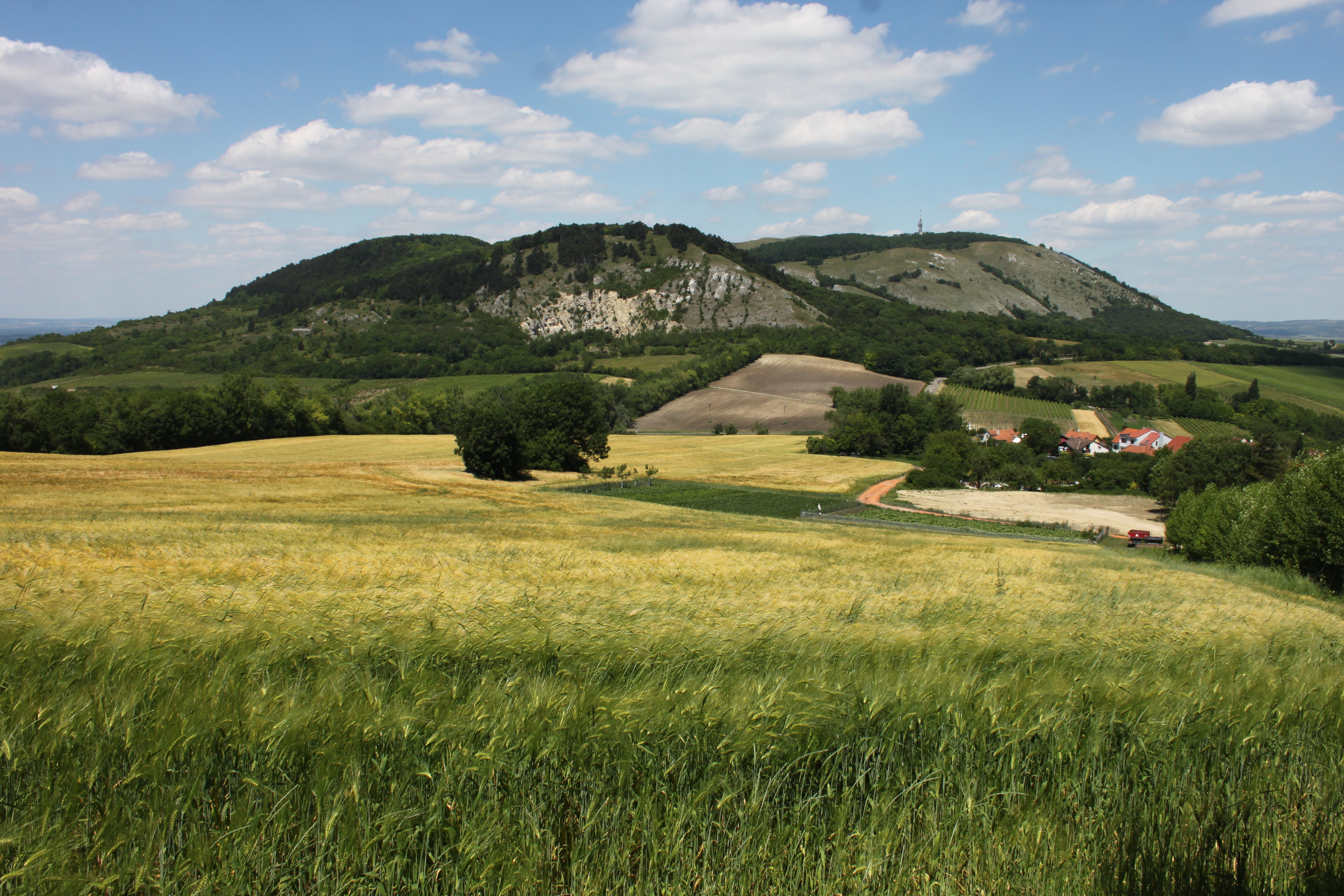
Vineyeards under Kotel and Děvín hills

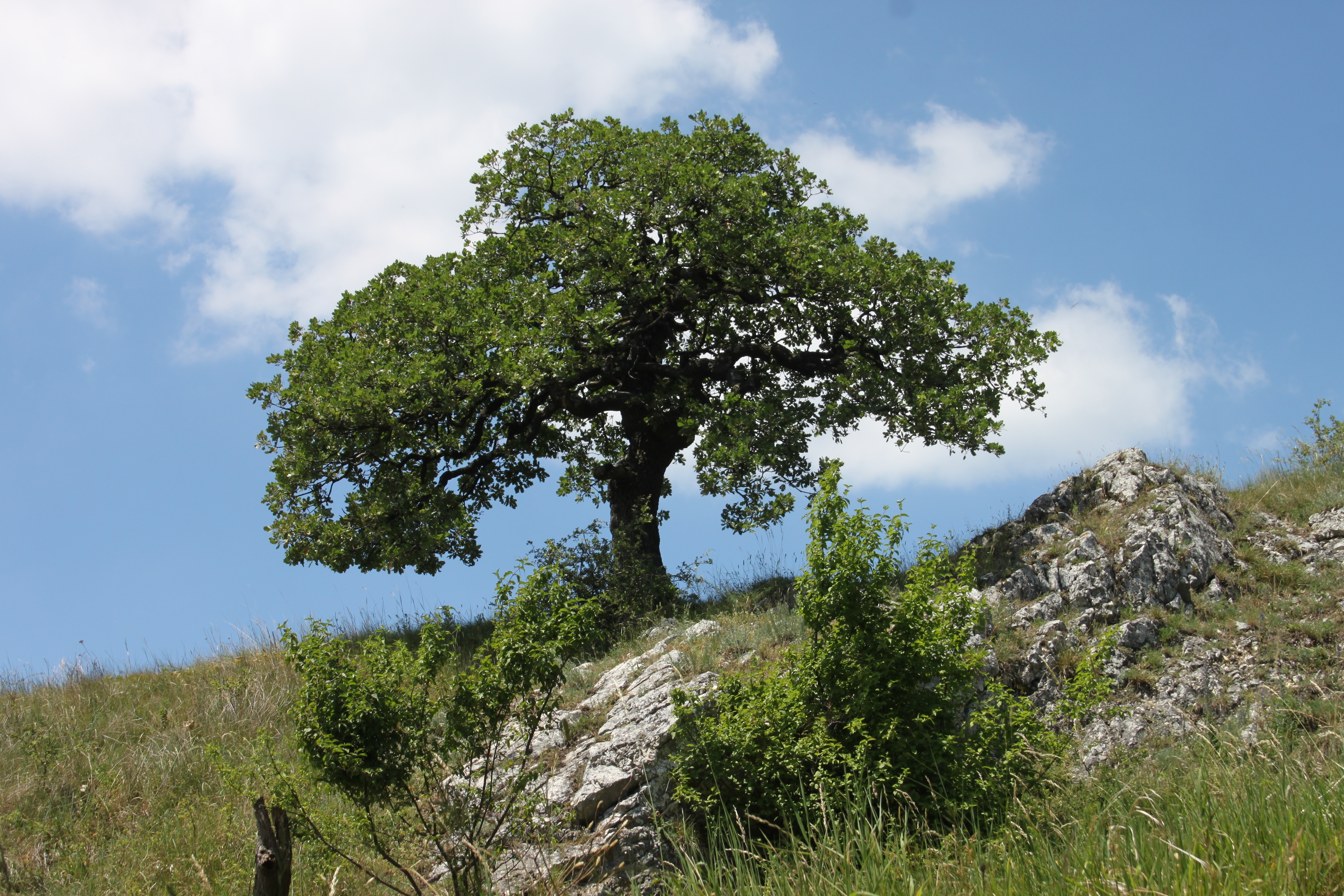
Old oak beaten and formed by wind

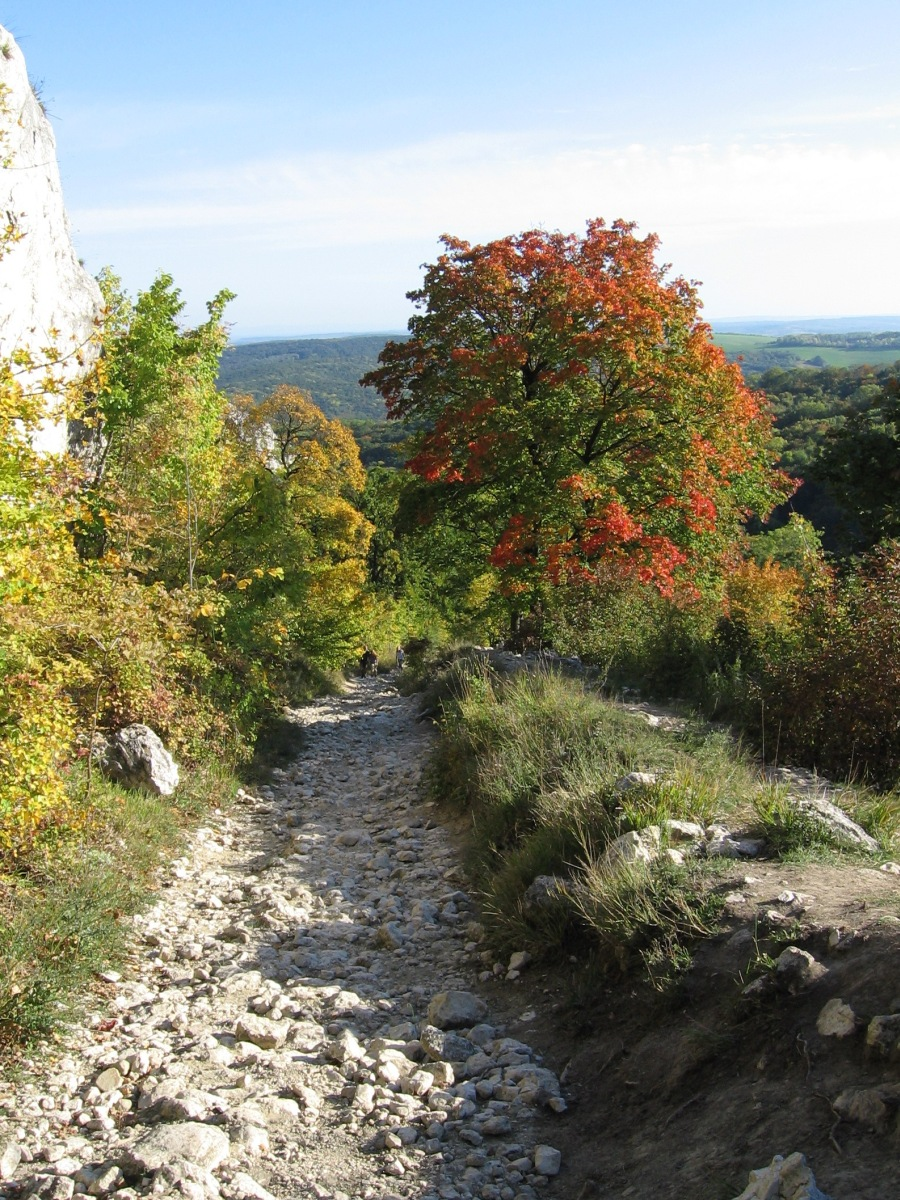
Old route in the rock

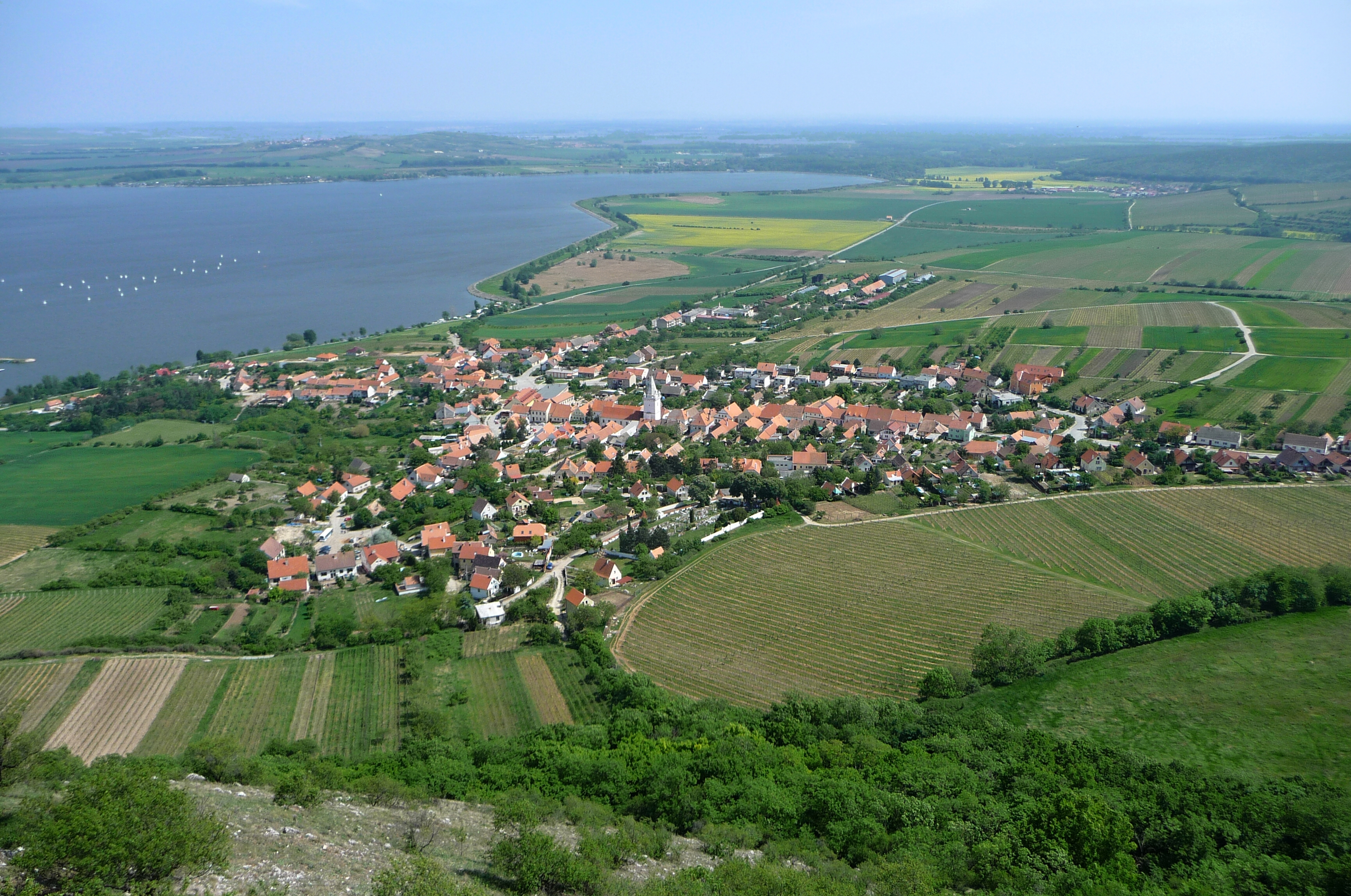
Outlook from Děvín summit to Pavlov village

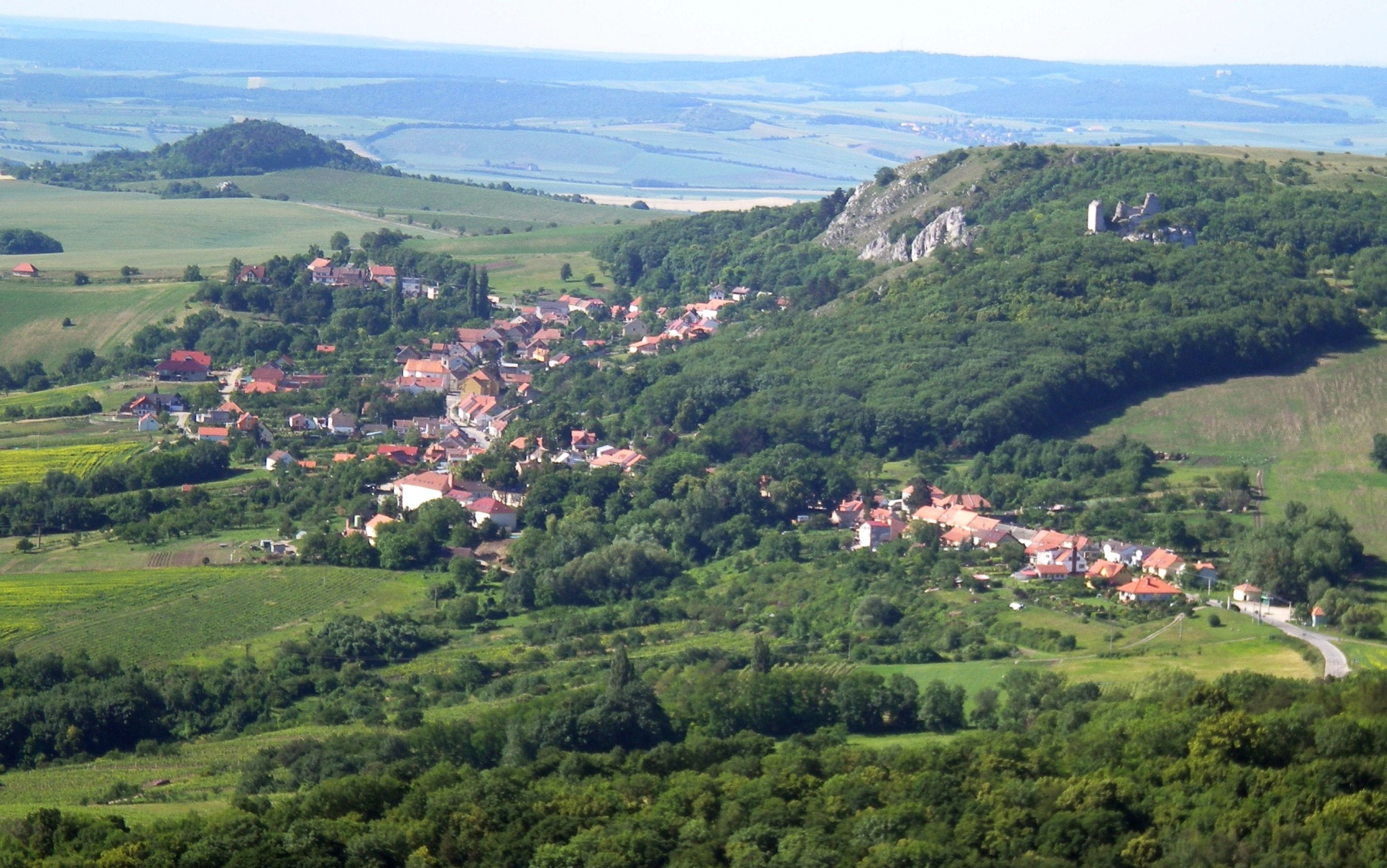
Klentnice as viewed from Děvín
