= Pálava Protected Landscape Area =

Pálava
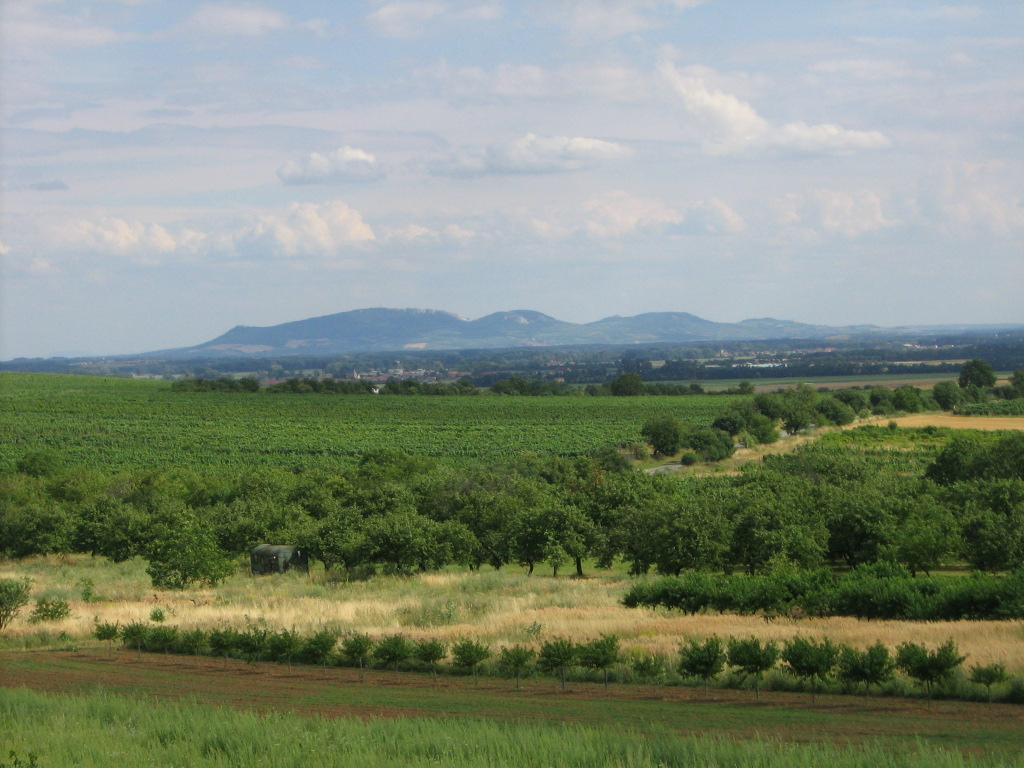
- Pálava from the northwest
- Interactive map of Pálava
- Location: South Moravian Region, Czech Republic
- Area: 83 km^{2} (32 sq mi)
- Established: 1976-03-19
- Operator: PLA Administration Pálava
- Website: palava.ochranaprirody.cz/en/

The Pálava Protected Landscape Area (abbreviated Pálava PLA; Czech: Chráněná krajinná oblast Pálava, abbreviated CHKO Pálava) is a protected landscape area and a UNESCO biosphere reserve located in the South Moravian Region in the Czech Republic, on the border with Austria. The highest point is Děvín with its 550 metres (1,800 ft) a.s.l.

== Description ==
This unique area was originally recognized by UNESCO in 1986 and expanded in 2003 to include another UNESCO site, the Lednice–Valtice Cultural Landscape. Pálava PLA is dominated by the limestone Pálava Hills (part of the outer Western Carpathians), and contains a significant proportion of natural or little affected steppe ecosystems that include meadow steppe, forest steppe, and thermophilic oak forest. In the floodplain of the river Thaya, forests alternate with meadows and wetland habitat that also include halophytic vegetation. The remaining part of Pálava PLA is used agriculturally, with many sustainably farmed vineyards that are a part of the Mikulovská wine subregion.

Pálava PLA contains well preserved monuments of historical significance, such as the Paleolithic site in Dolní Věstonice where the Venus of Dolní Věstonice was discovered. The largest town in Pálava PLA is Mikulov, located in its southernmost part.

== Gallery ==
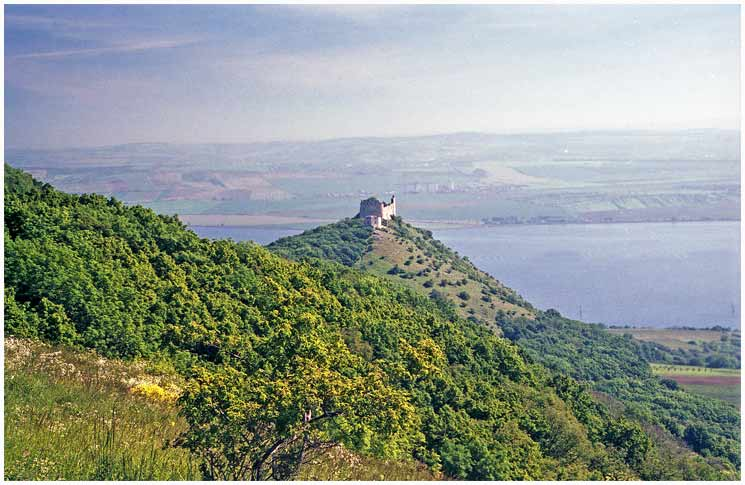
Děvičky Castle ruins over Nové Mlýny Reservoir

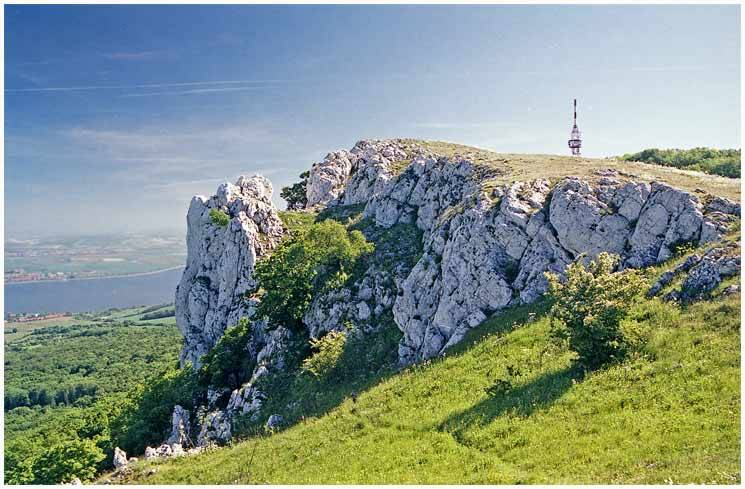
Děvín

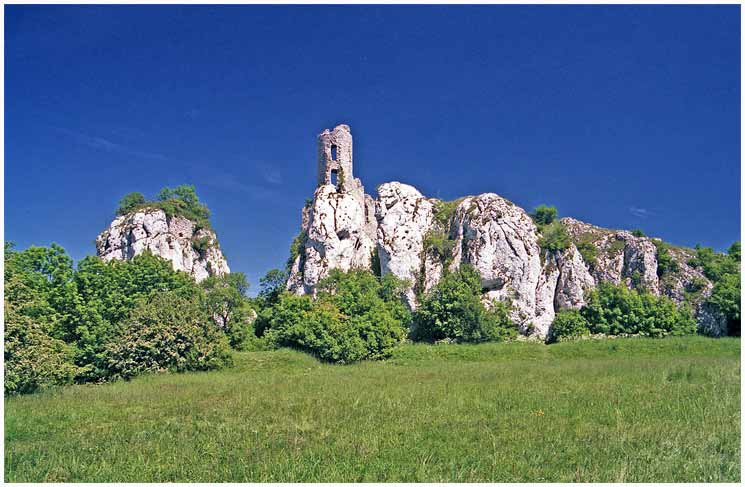
Sirotčí hrádek castle ruins

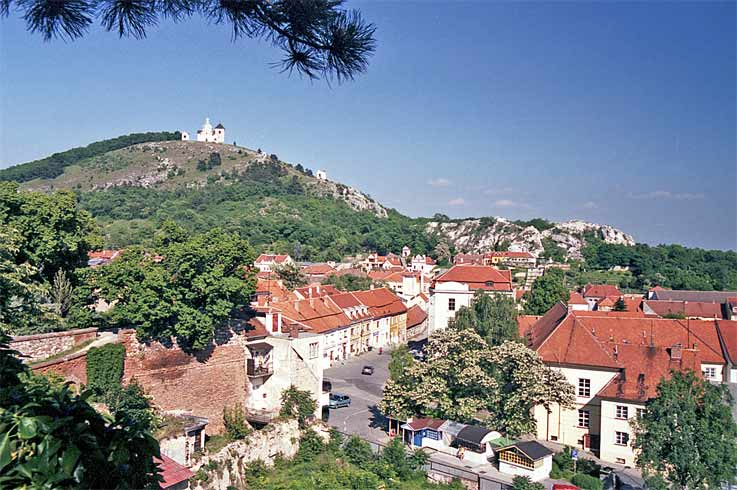
Svatý kopeček hill over Mikulov
