= Věstonice Reservoir =

Reservoir on the Thaya River, South Moravia, Czech Republic

Coordinates: 48°53′52″N 16°36′56″E

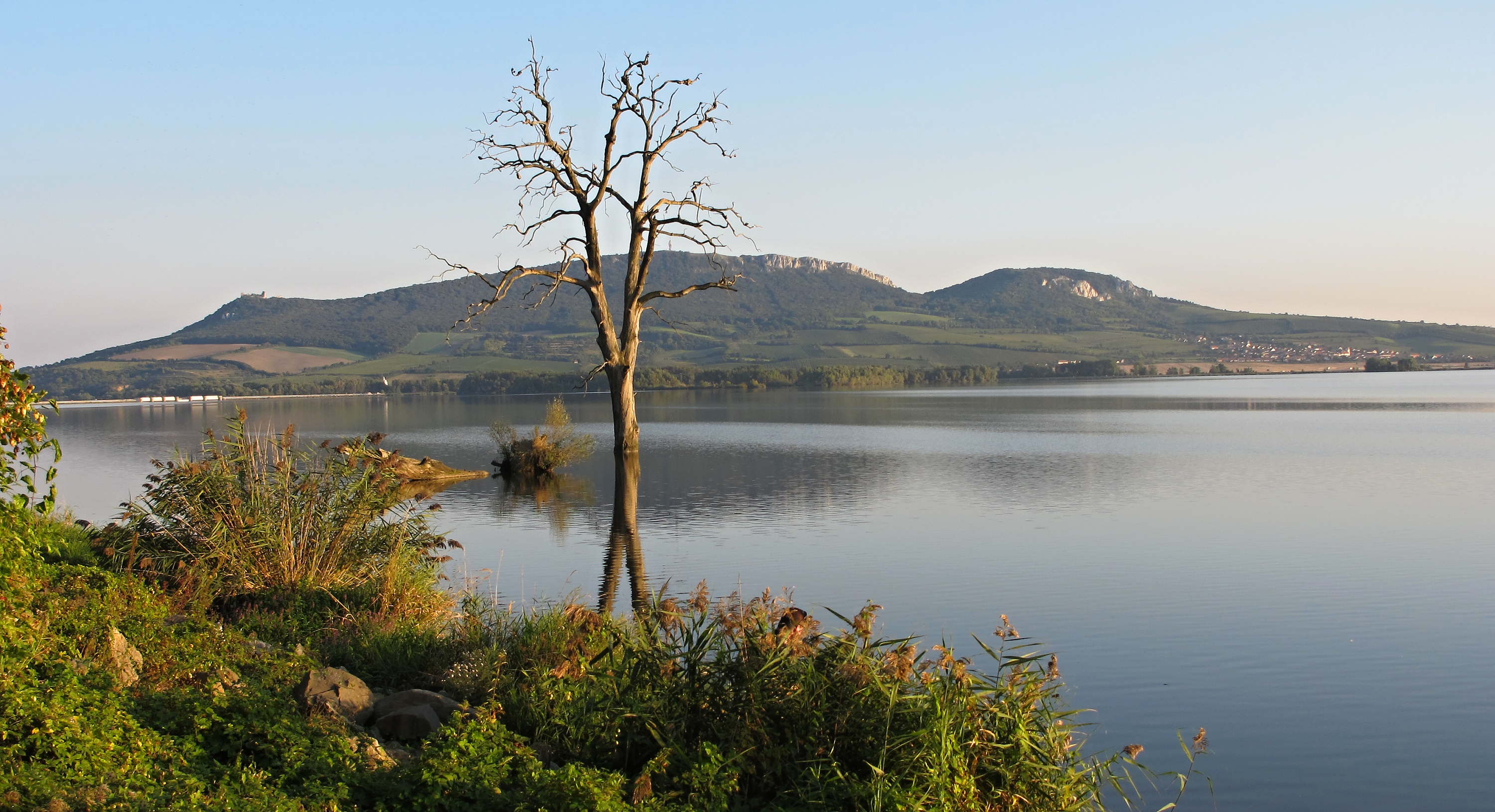

- Location within Czech Republic
- Location: South Moravian Region
- Primary inflows: Thaya, Jihlava, Svratka
- Primary outflows: Thaya
- Basin countries: Czech Republic

Věstonice Reservoir (Czech: Vodní nádrž Nové Mlýny II, Věstonická nádrž) is a reservoir on the Thaya River in the South Moravia. It is 1668 ha in area. The reservoir was built on the place of Mušov village. The area has been protected as a nature reserve since 1994 together with the mouth of rivers Jihlava and Svratka.
