= Publius Aelius Crispinus =

Roman eques and governor

Publius Aelius Crispinus was a Roman eques who held a number of appointments in the second century AD. He is known from a series of inscriptions.

His public career is known from an inscription recovered from Bir Selmoun in modern Algeria. Crispinus had his start as a soldier, reaching the rank of centurion and twice achieving primus pilus. After this he was appointed to several civilian positions, beginning with procurator or manager of the Emperor's properties in Hispania Tarraconensis, then procurator or governor of Mauretania Tingitana; an inscription found at Volubilis in modern Morocco allows us to date his tenure to 173. Crispinus then returned to Rome where he was appointed to procurator vicesima hereditatium, or overseer of the inheritance tax of 5%; J. E. H. Spaul notes this order was unusual, as other known equites (e.g. Publius Besius Betuinianus, and Marcus Gavius Maximus) were appointed as overseers of the inheritance tax then to the governorship. "Has this financial post become more important, or Tingitana less?" Spaul wonders. This was followed by another procuratorship at Rome where he oversaw all inheritances (hereditatium). His last known appointment was as procurator or governor of Mauretania Caesariensis.

The life of Aelius Crispinus after this is a blank.

== See also ==
- List of Roman governors of Mauretania Tingitana
