= Roman fort, Mušov =

Archaeological site in Czechia

Roman fortress in Mušov
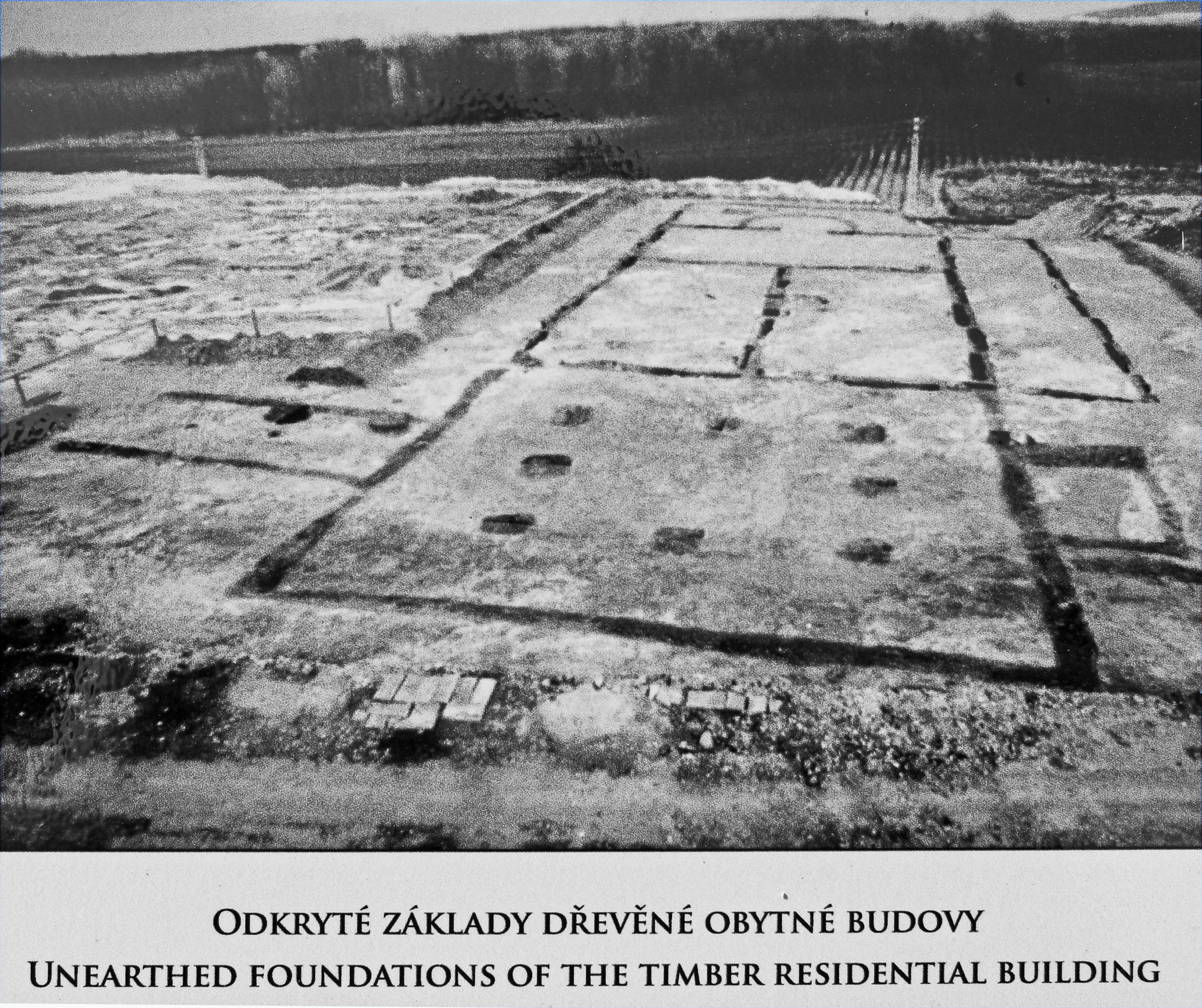
- Fortress praetorium

- Location within Czech Republic
- 48°54′N 16°34′E
- Type: Castrum
- Periods: Roman Empire
- Location: Moravia, Czech Republic
- Region: Marcomania

Site notes
- Material: wood, stone, bricks

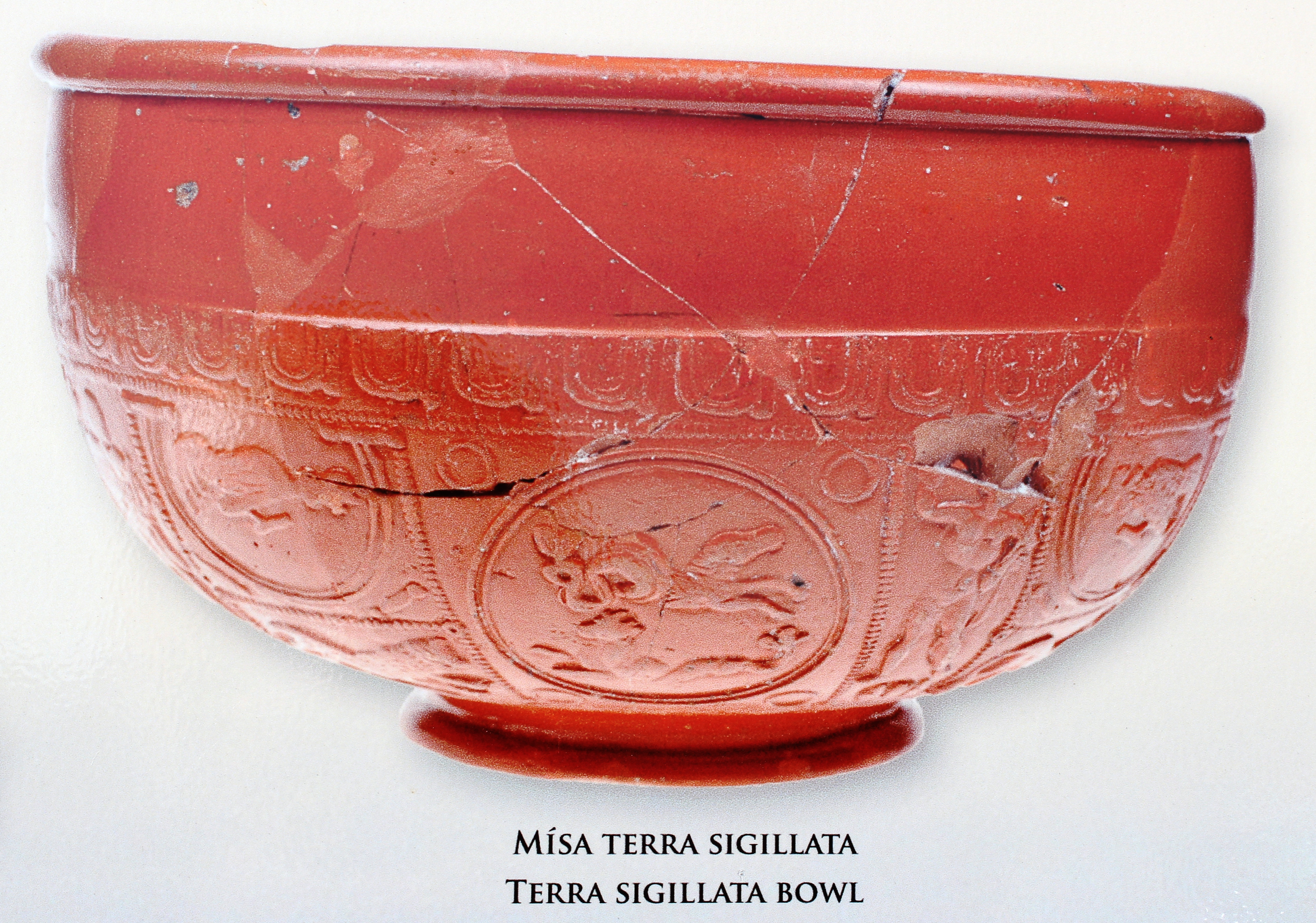
Bowl of Terra sigillata

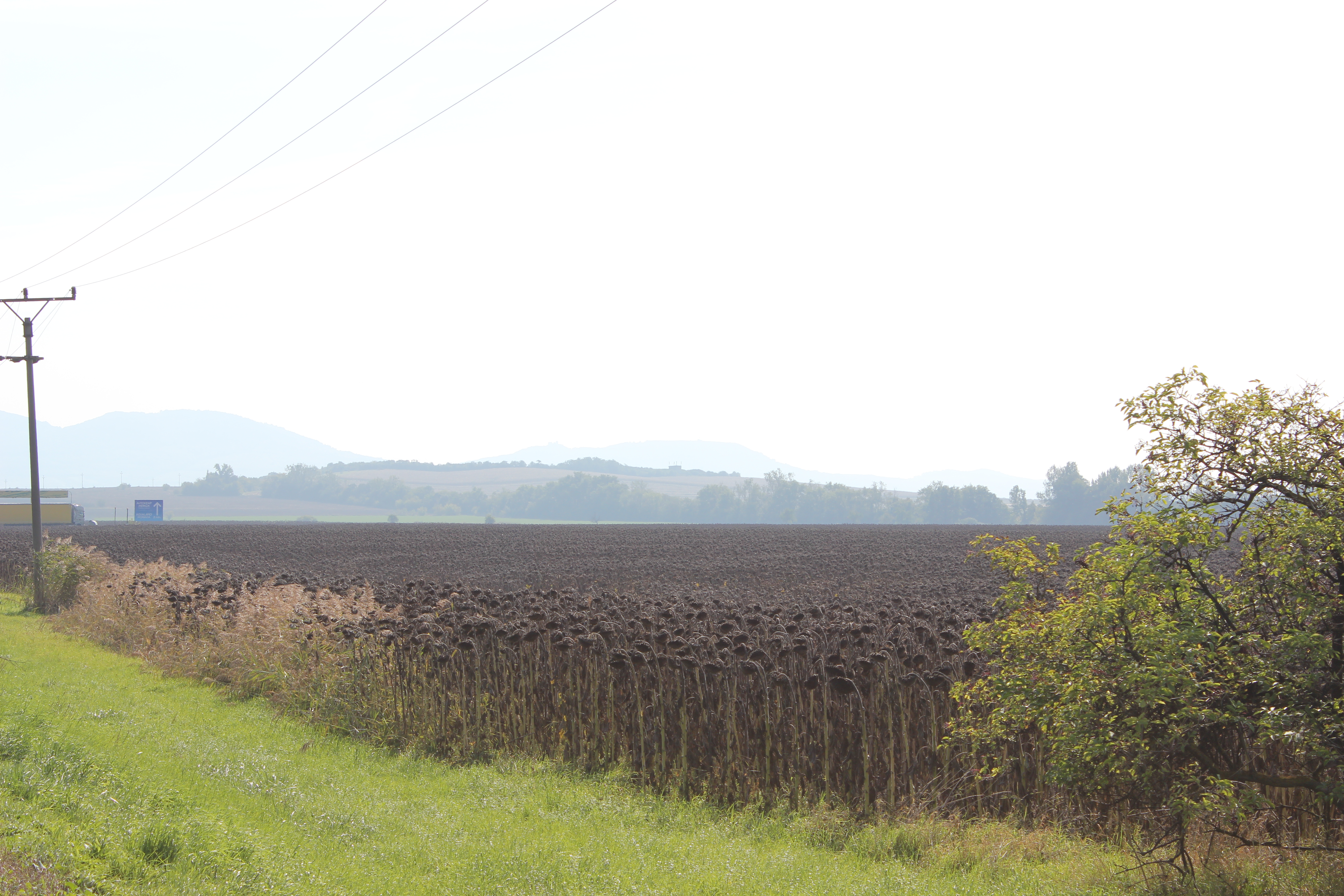
The typical landscape silhouette of the fortress - Northern view

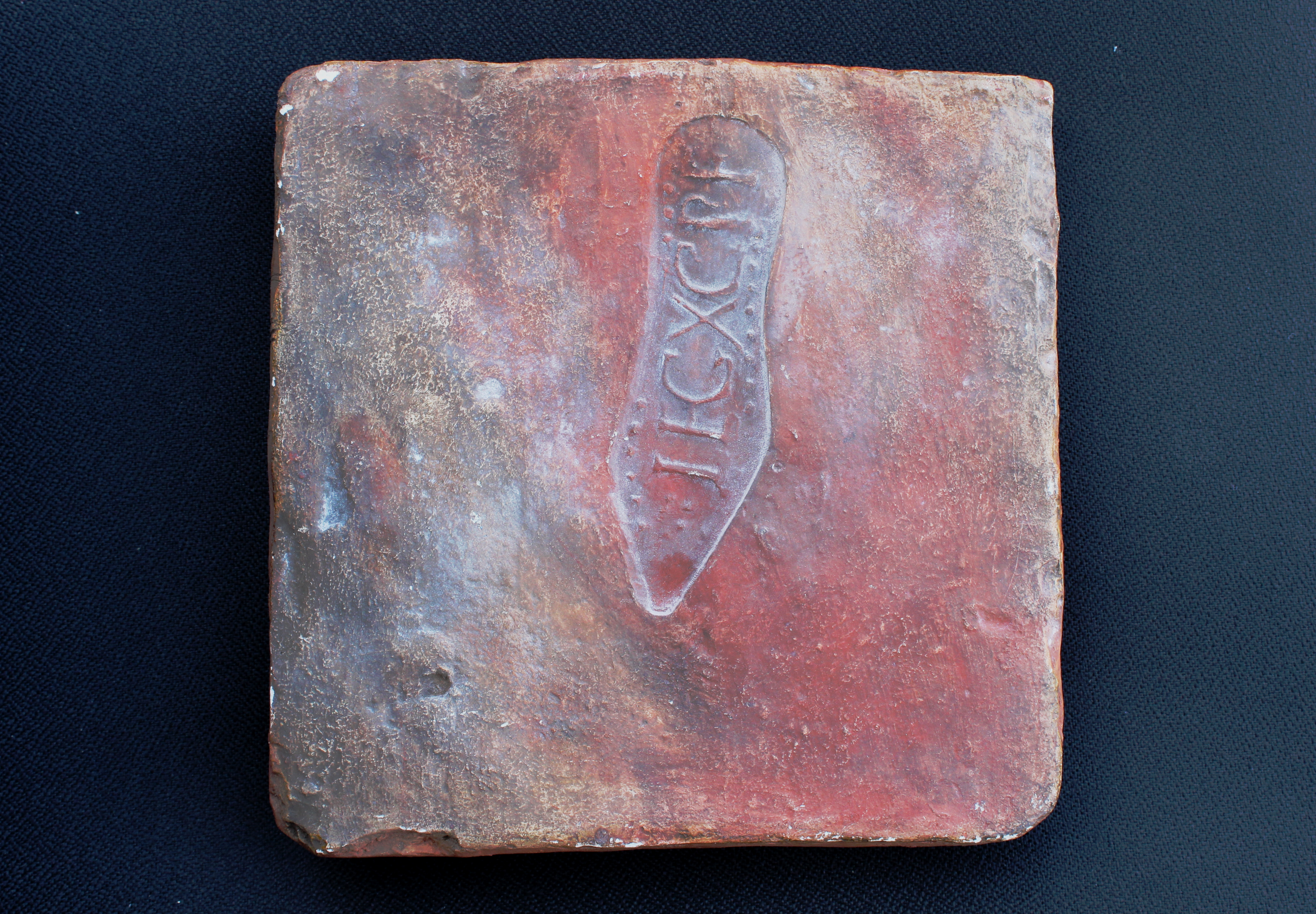
Brick with stamp of Leggio X

The Roman fort (Czech: římská pevnost or Czech: Hradisko, German: Burgstall) is an archaeological site located in Mušov, Czech Republic, of a Roman army camp on the Dyje-Svratka-Jihlava confluence. It was intended to become the capital of the proposed Marcomannia province (Moravia).

== Geography ==
The site is located on the Dyje-Svratka-Jihlava confluence. It is situated 36 km from Brno and 86 km from Vienna.

== History ==
The castra in Mušov originated as a Roman army camp. Its original name is unknown (possibly, but uncertainly, it was Eburon, from Ptolemy's Eβυρον). Romans made it his base of operations in the campaigns against Maroboduus (Marbod). So far its importance in the European context remains the site and its accompanying evidence of the period of the Marcomannic Wars (166–180 AD) – the central military base on the hill Hradisko (Hillfort) at Mušov (now cadastral area of Pasohlávky).

It was built by Marcus Aurelius' soldiers deep inside enemy territory, roughly 86 km to the north of the antique Vindobona (today Vienna). The base covers a flat minor hilltop, elevated 50 m above the surrounding terrain and its southern mild slopes, on the banks of the river Dyje (Thaya). From this strategic location crossings of the river (fort) and overland routes at the confluence of the rivers Svratka, Svitava and Dyje (Thaya) as well as surrounding areas along the rivers could be controlled. The area was densely populated by the Germanic tribes of Marcomanii.

In Roman times it had a history as a trading center for amber (in analogy as in Carnuntum), brought from the north to traders who sold it in Italy; the main arm of the Amber Road crossed the Danube at Carnuntum and continue on the right bank of the Dyje. Marcus Aurelius resided there for a short time, shortly before his death in 180 AD, during the Second Marcomannic War.

During the Barbarian Invasions (reoccupation of the territory) "Eburon" was eventually abandoned and used as a cemetery and source of building material for projects elsewhere. Eventually, its remains were covered by decaying plant material.

=== Civilian city ===
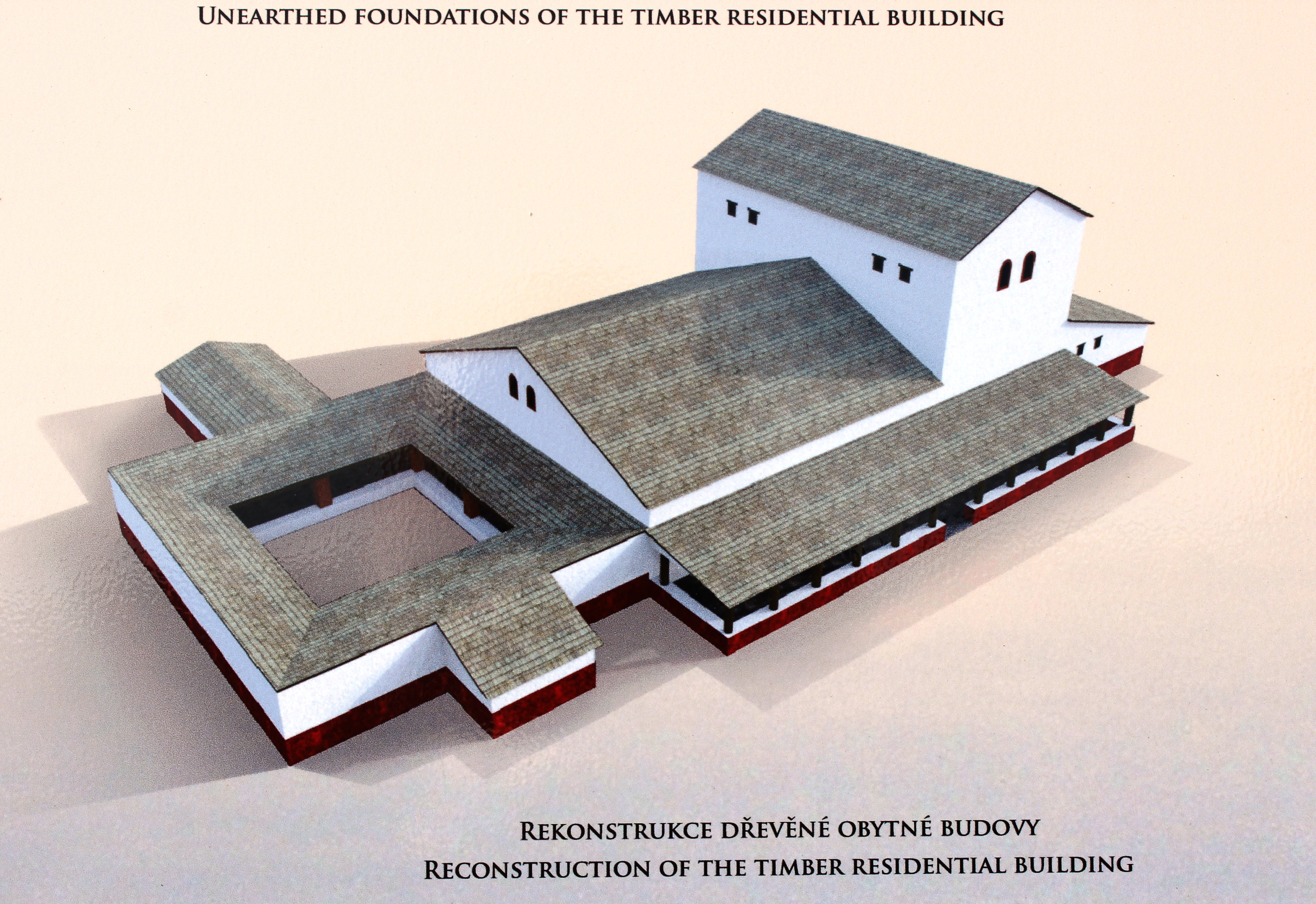
Reconstruction of the timber house

The remains of the civilian city surrounded the fortress above. Housing around the upper Roman fort measured more than 11 square kilometres, and was a lightly fortified area densely populated by the Germanic tribes of Marcomanni (or Quadi) (those who traded and collaborated with the Romans and enjoyed luxury Roman goods. They had a partly civilised life. The area was bounded by left (northern) bank of Dyje river in the south, right (western) bank of Jihlava River in the east and in the north by rectangular plan enclosed V-shaped ditch. This area is probably older than the real Roman fort atop the hill.

=== Balneum ===
A limited part of the developed area of the Roman fortress was uncovered. Between 1926 and 1928 unique evidence of ancient Roman architecture was uncovered in the north parts of the fortified area. An enclosure, consisting of a residential building with four rooms and baths could be interpreted as a luxurious residential complex, as an ad hoc residence for the highest military authorities. Smaller scale baths implies private use, but all necessary rooms appeared to have cold and hot water.

=== Military camps ===
In the surrounding was discovered more than twelve temporary Roman military camps (marching camps). In seasonal operations (179 AD) more than 50,000 legionaries settled there, mostly from Legio X Gemina.

== Workshop ==
In the open area among the buildings simple round kilns and one sizable waste pit were uncovered. This installation served as a workshop district, specialized among others for repair and perhaps production of Roman military equipment and weaponry. This evidence supports the hypothesis that inside the fortified area civilian personnel operated under protection of the Roman army. Their sustenance depended on contracts with the Roman army and for that they followed them even in time of war into hostile territory

== See also ==
- Slovakia in the Roman era
