= List of Roman governors of Mauretania Tingitana =

This is a list of known governors of Mauretania Tingitana. It was one of the imperial provinces, governed by an appointee of the emperor, in this case a member of the equites. Some governors of Mauretania Tingitana were assigned to simultaneously govern the neighboring province of Mauretania Caesariensis; their names appear in bold.

Prefects of Mauretania Tingitana
Date	Prefect
43 - 48	**Marcus Fadius Celer Flavianus Maximus**
48 - 53	Gaius Rutilius Secundus
69	**Lucceius Albinus**
c. 73 - 75	**Sextus Sentius Caecilianus**
88	Lucius Vallius Tranquillus
104	Lucius Plotius Grypus
109	Marcus Clodius Catullus
112 - 114	Publius Besius Betuinianus
114 - 116	Lucius Seius Avitus
120 - 122	Quintus Caecilius Redditus
128 - 130	Marcus Gavius Maximus
131-133	[Fre]ganius Maximus
31 December 135	[...]umius Rutillianus
between 135 and 142	Gaius Censorius Niger
144	Uttedius Honoratus
146 - 150	Quintus Baienus Blassianus
26 October 153	Flavius Flavianus
156/157	Titus Varius Priscus
157 - 162	Quintus Claudius Ferox Aeronius Montanus
162 - 164	Volusius Martialis
165 - 168	Titus Coiedius Maximus
173	Publius Aelius Crispinus
174 - 176	Epidius Quadratus
177	Gaius Vallius Maximianus
180	Decimus Veturius Macrinus
between 180 and 198	Aulus Scantius Larcianus
198/199	Gaius Julius Pacatianus
200	Gaius Sertorius Cattianus
202	Gnaeus Haius Diadumenianus
205 - 207	**Quintus Sallustius Macrinianus**
210	Gaius Julius Agrianus
215 - 217	Marcus Aurelius Sebastenus
between 217 and 222	Aurelius Januarius
between 221 and 223	**Gaius Julius Maximinus**
224 - 226	Quintus Herennius [...]
227 - 229	Lucius Aurelius Nemesianus
239	Marcus Ulpius Victor
241 - 245	Marcus Marturius Victorinus
246 - 250	Marcus Antonius Navillus Asiaticus
between 250 and 277	Flavius Ingenianus
277 - 280	Clementius Valerius Marcellinus

== See also ==
- Lists of ancient Roman governors
