= Mušov =

- Cadastral area and former village
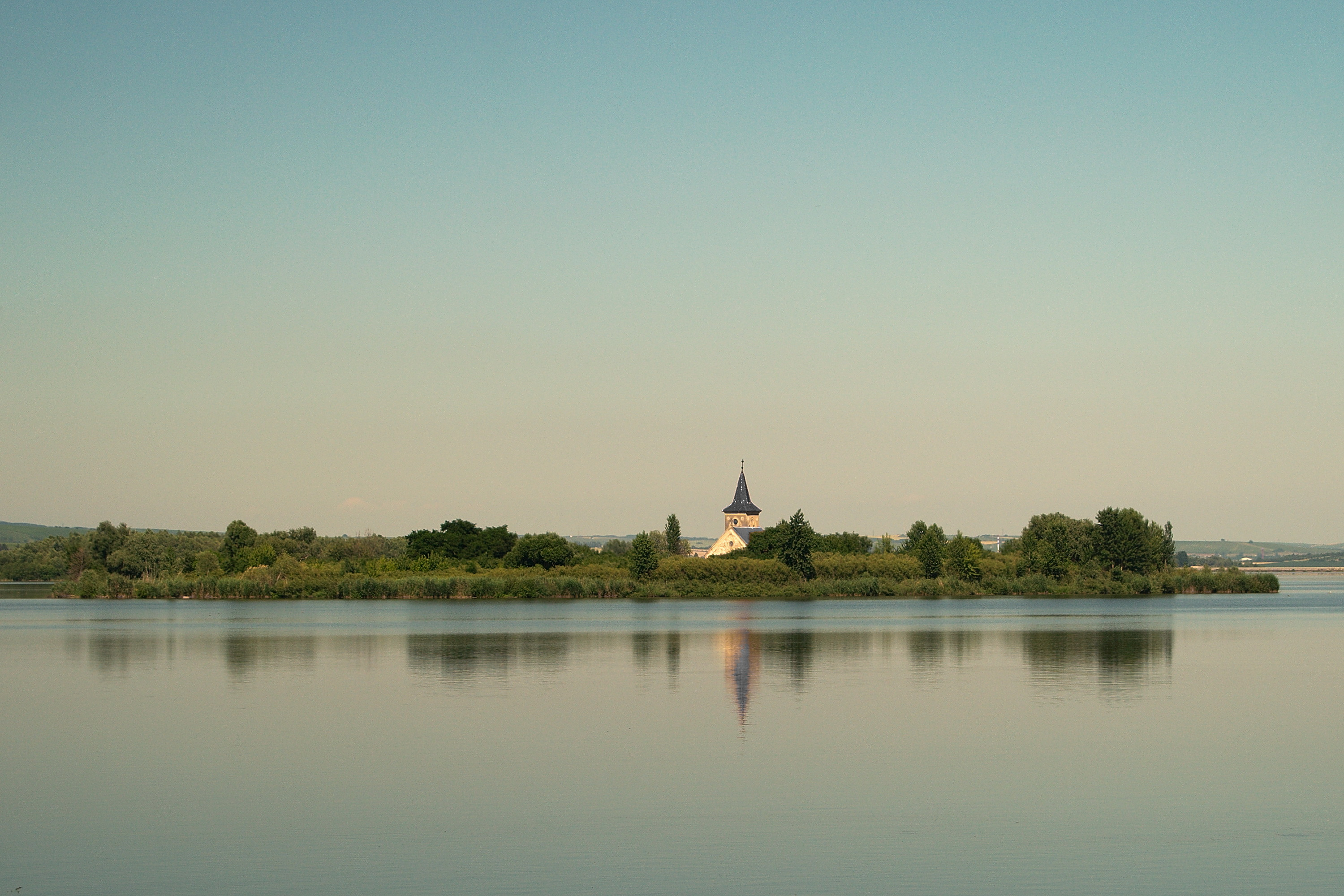
- Church of Saint Leonard of Noblac, the only remaining building left, standing on an island in the Věstonice Reservoir

- Location in the Czech Republic
- Coordinates: 48°53′45″N 16°35′59″E
- Country: Czech Republic
- Region: South Moravian
- District: Brno-Country
- First mentioned: 1267

Area
  - Total: 14.20 km^{2} (5.48 sq mi)
- Elevation: 169 m (554 ft)

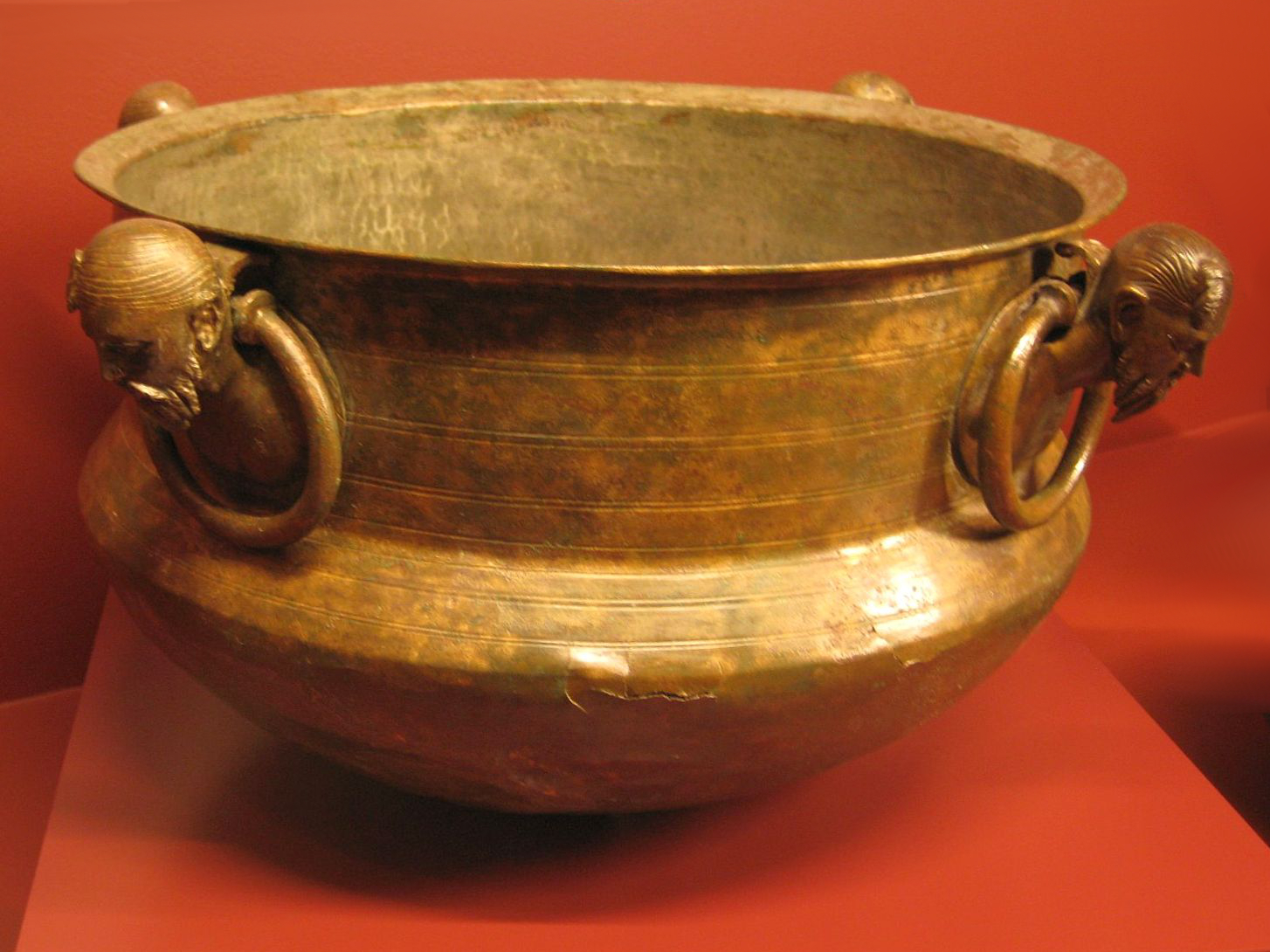
The so-called Mušov Cauldron, a Roman bronze cauldron found in 1988 in a Germanic chieftain's grave in Mušov, dating to the 2nd century AD The cauldron is decorated by four cast heads of Germanic men wearing a Suebian knot hairstyle that are attached and serve as handles.

Mušov (German: Muschau) is a cadastral area and a defunct village in the municipality of Pasohlávky, South Moravian Region, Czech Republic. It covers an area of 1,420 ha (3,500 acres).

== Geography and history ==
Mušov was the lowest-lying village in the Břeclav District. The village was destroyed despite the opposition of its inhabitants in the late 1970s, due to the decision of the then socialist authorities to build the Nové Mlýny reservoirs by flooding a unique ecosystem of the riparian forest in the area around the river Thaya. In 1976, the village was merged with the neighbouring municipality of Pasohlávky. The residents of Mušov could choose whether they wanted an apartment or to build a house in a newly built street in Pasohlávky. The village was flooded between 1981 and 1987. The post office in Mušov was last opened on 30 June 1978.

Thanks to the efforts of conservationists, it was decided to preserve the medieval St Leonard's church, now standing on a small island in the middle of the Věstonice Reservoir (the middle reservoir). An archaeological survey has found that the church is much older than previously thought. St Leonard's church, originally a late Romanesque building dating from the late 12th century, was rebuilt in Gothic style in the 14th century. The dating of subsequent Baroque modifications is not known. The abandoned island with the church is an important bird nesting spot and a protected area listed in the ecological network Natura 2000. It is opened to public during the summer months.

The wine cellars located on the north of the dam along the west side of the road leading to Pohořelice remained completely intact.

== Archaeological site ==
In the 2nd century AD, there used to be a Roman military settlement on the hill called Burgstall (today Hradisko), which is situated above the former village and above today's ATC Merkur camping at Pasohlávky. The Xth Roman legion was supposed to be responsible for checking the Germanic tribes defeated in Marcomannic Wars, during the reign of the Emperor Marcus Aurelius. The research on the site, located 80 km far from Vindobona (today's Vienna), started in 1927. The researchers found remnants of two masonry buildings, praetorium and balneum ("bath"), including hypocaustum. The foundings of bricks with the stamp of the Xth legion and coins from the period of the emperors Antoninus Pius, Marcus Aurelius, and Commodus facilitated dating of the locality. The youngest coins found in the area are from the era of Septimius Severus.

In 1988, a richly equipped tomb of a Germanic chieftain, apparently a Roman ally in the war, was found near to the hill. Furthermore, there was found a Slavic burial and numerous archaeological discoveries from various periods of prehistory.

The archaeological exhibition focusing on the ancient Roman presence in the area is situated in the ATC Merkur camping at Pasohlávky.

== Gallery ==
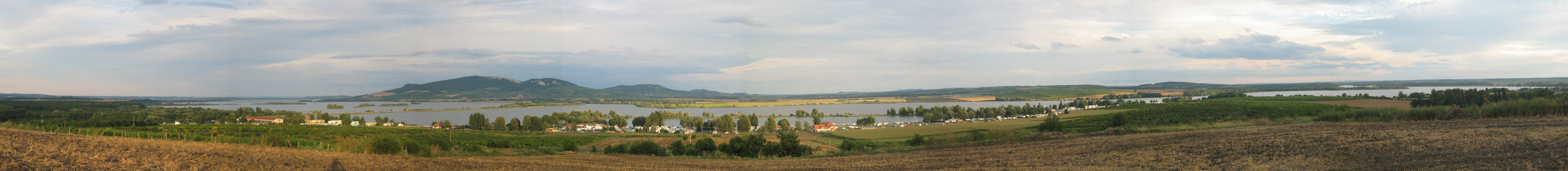
Panorama of Mušov with the Pálava Protected Landscape Area in the background

== Literature ==
- Peška, J., ed. (1991). Královská hrobka z Mušova. Barbaři a Římané nad středním Dunajem v prvních dvou stoletích nového letopočtu (in Czech). Mikulov.
- Kordiovský, Emil; et al. (2000). Mušov 1276-2000 (in Czech). Znojmo: FPO Znojmo.
- Šebela, Miroslav (2005). Živá voda pod Pálavou (in Czech). Moravské zemské muzeum. ISBN 80-7028-247-9.
