= Baths at Ostia =

Archaeological sites in Italy

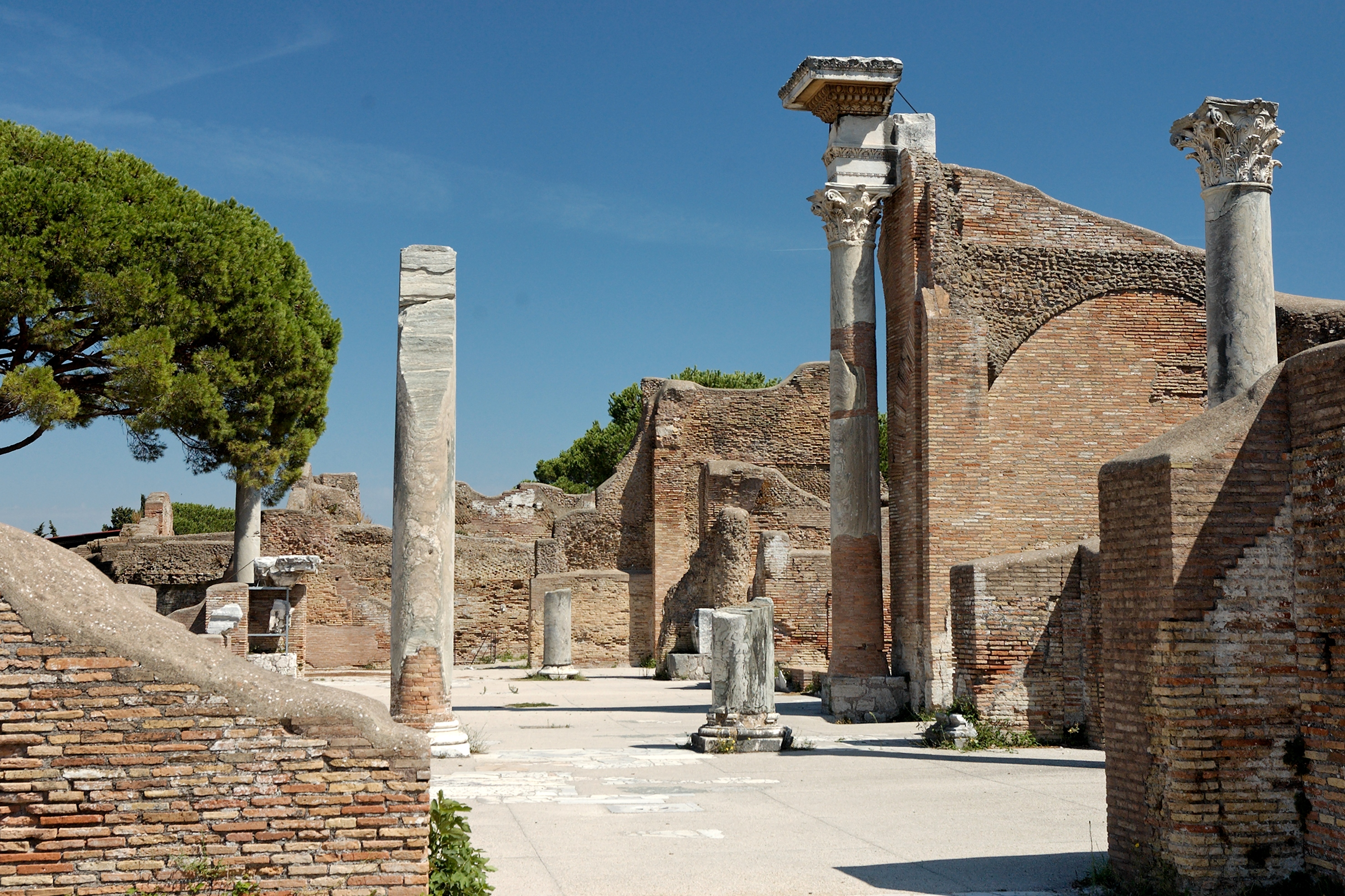
- Ostia, Forum Baths
- Click on the map to see marker.
- 41°45′14″N 12°17′21″E
- Location: Ostia, Province of Roma

Site notes
- Website: www.ostiaantica.beniculturali.it

Excavations at Ostia Antica have brought to light 26 bath complexes in the town. These range from large public baths, such as the Forum Baths, to smaller, often private ones, such as the small baths (Regio I, XIX, 5).

Baths in Ostia, like elsewhere in the Roman world, would have served both a hygienic and a social function. Bath construction increased after an aqueduct was built to Ostia in the early Julio-Claudian Period.

Many of the baths follow simple linear arrangements, with one room following the next, due to the density of buildings in Ostia. Only a few, like the Forum Baths or the Baths of the Swimmers, had the space to include a palaestra. Archaeologists name the bathhouses from features preserved, for example the inscription of Buticoso in building I, XIV, 8 leads to the name Bath of Buticosus or the mosaic of Neptune in building II, IV, 2 leads to the Baths of Neptune. The baths in Ostia follow the standard numbering convention, which divides the town into five regions, numbered I to V, and then identifies the individual blocks and buildings as follows: (region) I, (block) I, (building) 1.

== Regio I ==
=== Forum Baths ===
The Forum Baths (I, XII, 6) are located of the Via della Forica south of the Forum. The complex is also called the Thermae Gavii Maximi, named after Marcus Gavius Maximus, the praetorian prefect who sponsored their construction. The baths were intended for public use and covered c. 3,200 m^{2}. Statues of Hygieia, Aesculapius, and Fortuna were some of the many statues recovered from the bath that most likely belonged to the Forum Bath's decorative program. Additionally, cipollino columns were used to decorate the bathhouse.

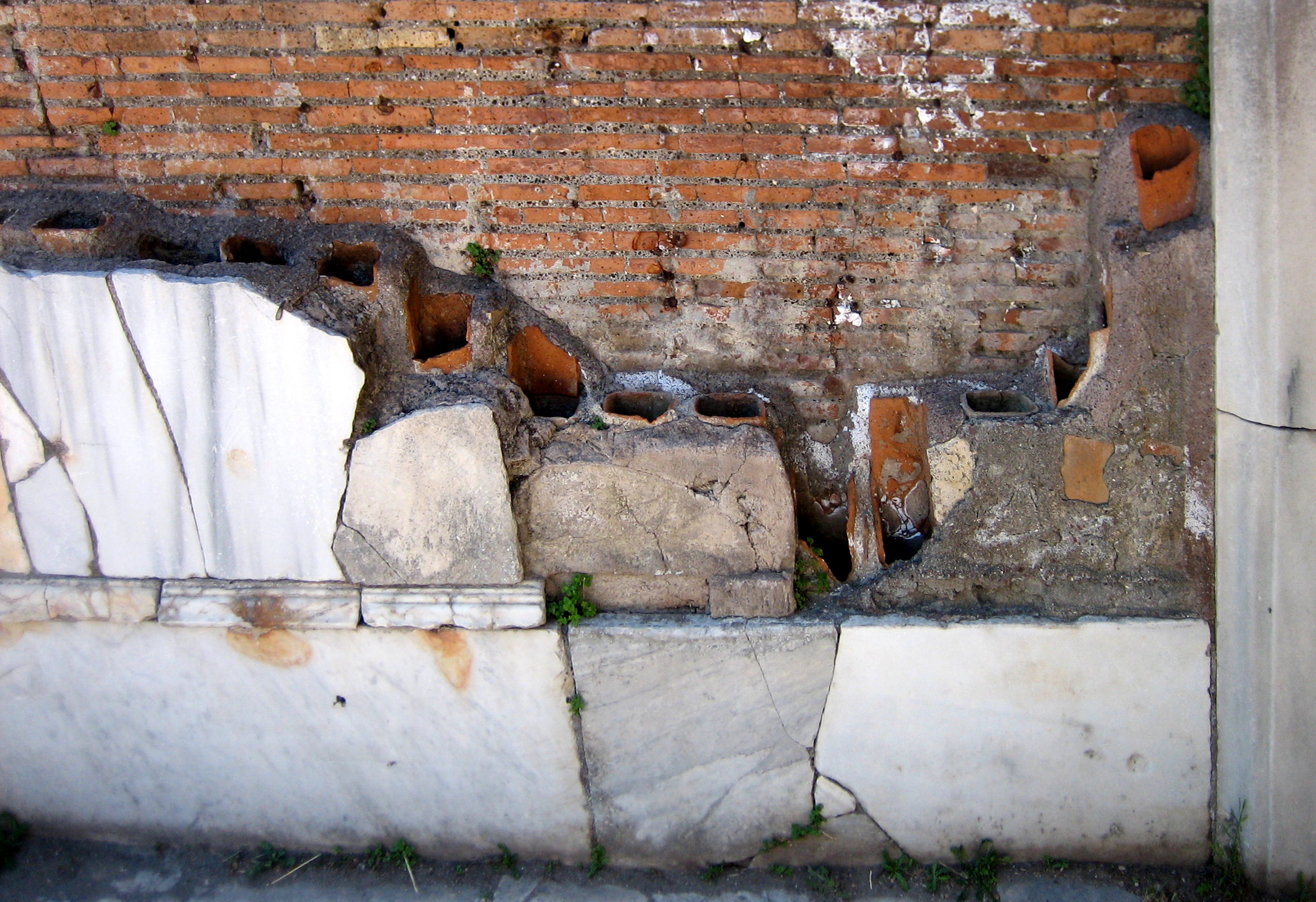
Tubuli of the Forum Baths

There were several phases of construction for the baths. The Forum Baths were initially built during the reigns of Emperor Antoninus Pius c. 160 with subsequent additions during the Severan Dynasty (193-225), reign of Maxentius and Constantine (306-337), and finally during the reign of Theodosius (379-395). The Baths were constructed in the city centre and were the largest of all Ostia baths with a large palaestra south of the main building. The Forum Baths are characteristic of the experimental mode of planning during Hadrianic-Antonine period. The structure may have reached 15–17 m tall, although not as high the remains are still impressive. Along the southern face of the building are the warm rooms of the bathhouse, placed to take advantage of the sun's passive heating. Here a modern visitor can see the octagonal sun-bathing room (heliocaminus), an elliptical sweating room (laconicum) two tepidaria and a caldarium with three pools. The palaestra was surrounded on three sides by porticos which shaded the entrance to shops. Many hairpins were recovered during excavations proving that the baths were used by women. It is assumed that this would be at a separate time of day from men, but no clear evidence exists.

=== Baths of Buticosus ===
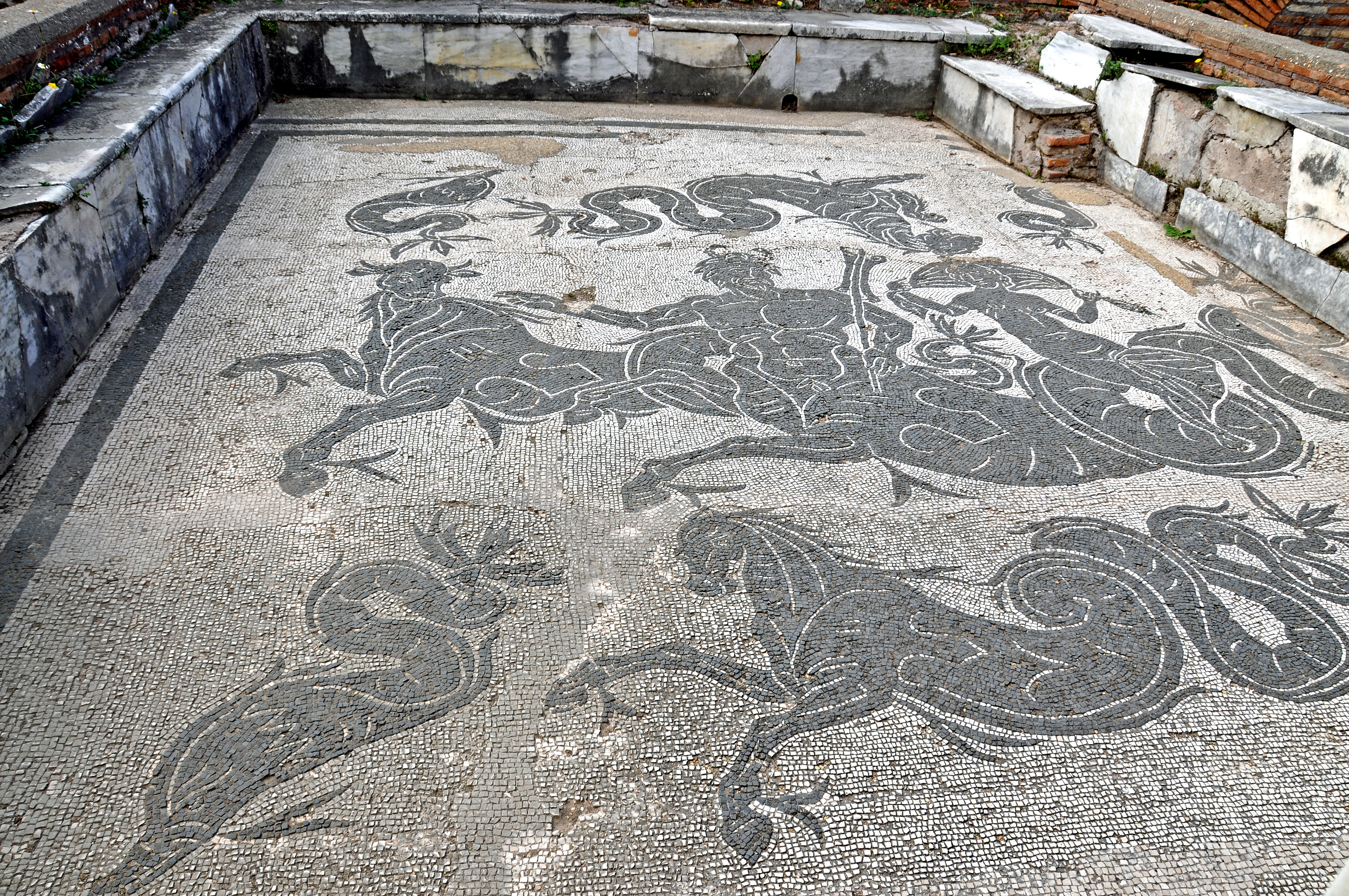
Mosaic of Triton and a Nereid, Baths of Buticosus

This small bathhouse (I, XIV, 8) was constructed during the reign of Trajan circa 110 and remodeled in the middle of the second century This bath is typical of many of the balnea in Ostia, where the rooms are built into the established city grid leading to a chaotic interior layout often without a palaestra. In Room 4 is a black-and-white mosaic with marine animals and a man. Besides the man is an inscription EPICTETVS BVTICOSVS, giving the bath house its modern name. This man was a bathing attendant and holds a bucket and a stick. In the caldarium is another black-and-white mosaic with a marine scene of Triton and Nereid. The bath was supplied with water by a tank equipped with a noria in the adjacent Republican Sacred Area. These baths also preserved frescoes with garden images, creating an illusion of a real garden.

=== Baths of Mithras ===
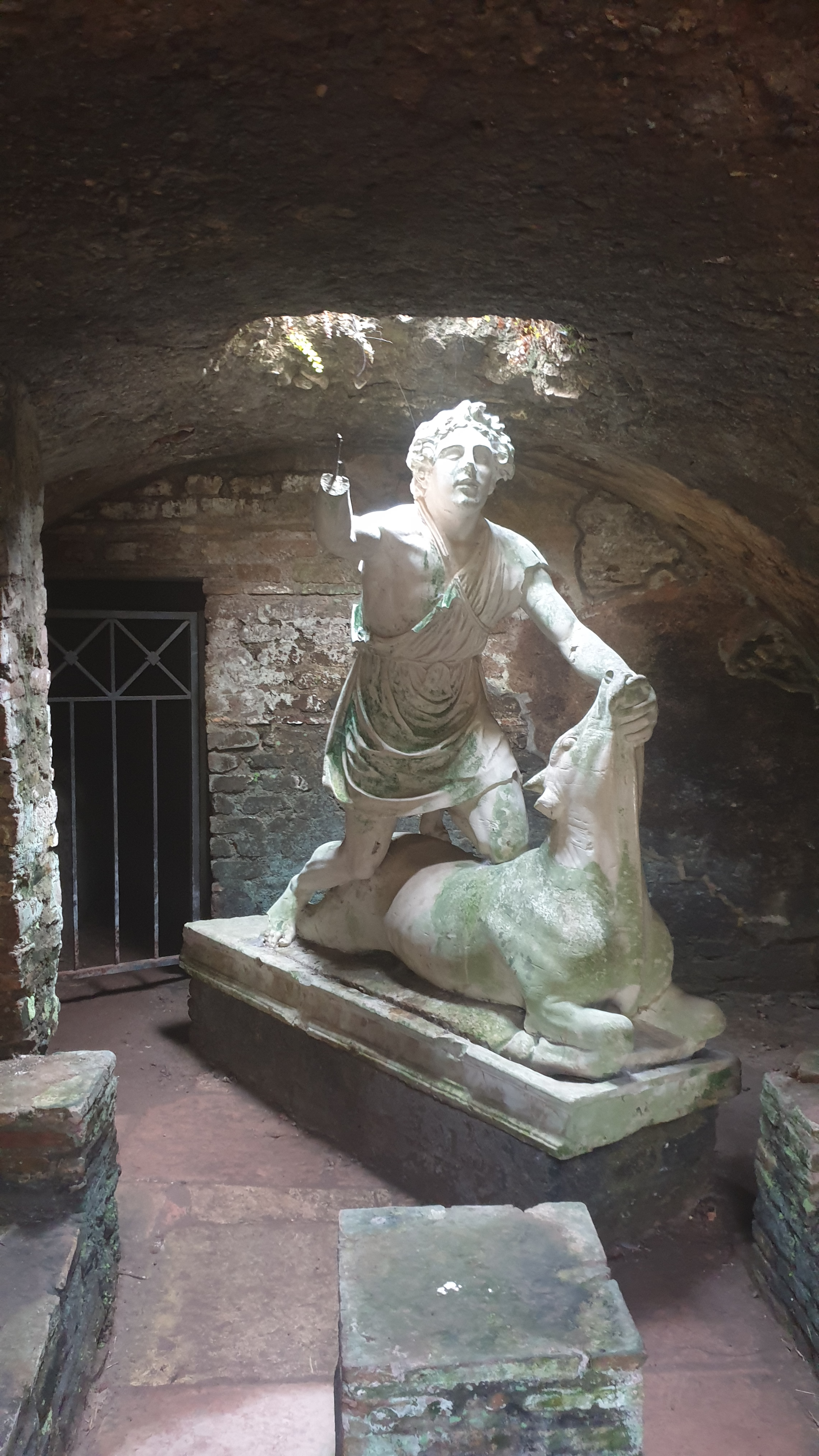
Mithraeum of the Baths of Mithras

The baths of Mithras (I, XVII, 2) were built around c. 125 C.E. and modified in the early Severan Period. The eponymous mithraeum was built in the late second or early third century C.E. and is accessible by a staircase in the northern part of the building. The remains preserve evidence of the utilitarian aspects of a Roman bathhouse such as a waterwheel for bringing water into the bathhouse and a boiler room for heating the caldaria and tepidaria. The frigidarium contains an apsidal pool and a mosaic showing Ulysses and the Sirens. Some of the earliest Christian imagery found in Ostia comes from the Baths of Mithras.

=== Small Baths ===
This bath (I, XIX, 5)(c. 385 square meters (4,140 sq ft)) was built in late antiquity around 450-500 C.E. reusing Hadrianic bricks. It was accessible only from the warehouse to the east of it. It is one of the last building projects before the abandonment of the city. The building was constructed above the rubble of the collapsed insulae and reused many of the rooms in the area for the bath such as the street entrance of a former shop being converted into the apodyterium.

=== Hadrianic Bath ===
Under the Forum of the Heroic Statue (I, XII, 2) and the neighboring House the Cistern (I, XII, 4) are the remains of a bathhouse from the Hadrianic period. An octagonal room with niches is preserved in the House of the Cistern with evidence of a missing hypocaust system suggesting that this room was a heated part of the bath, although the later buildings have obscured much of the original use.

== Regio II ==
=== Baths of the Coachmen ===
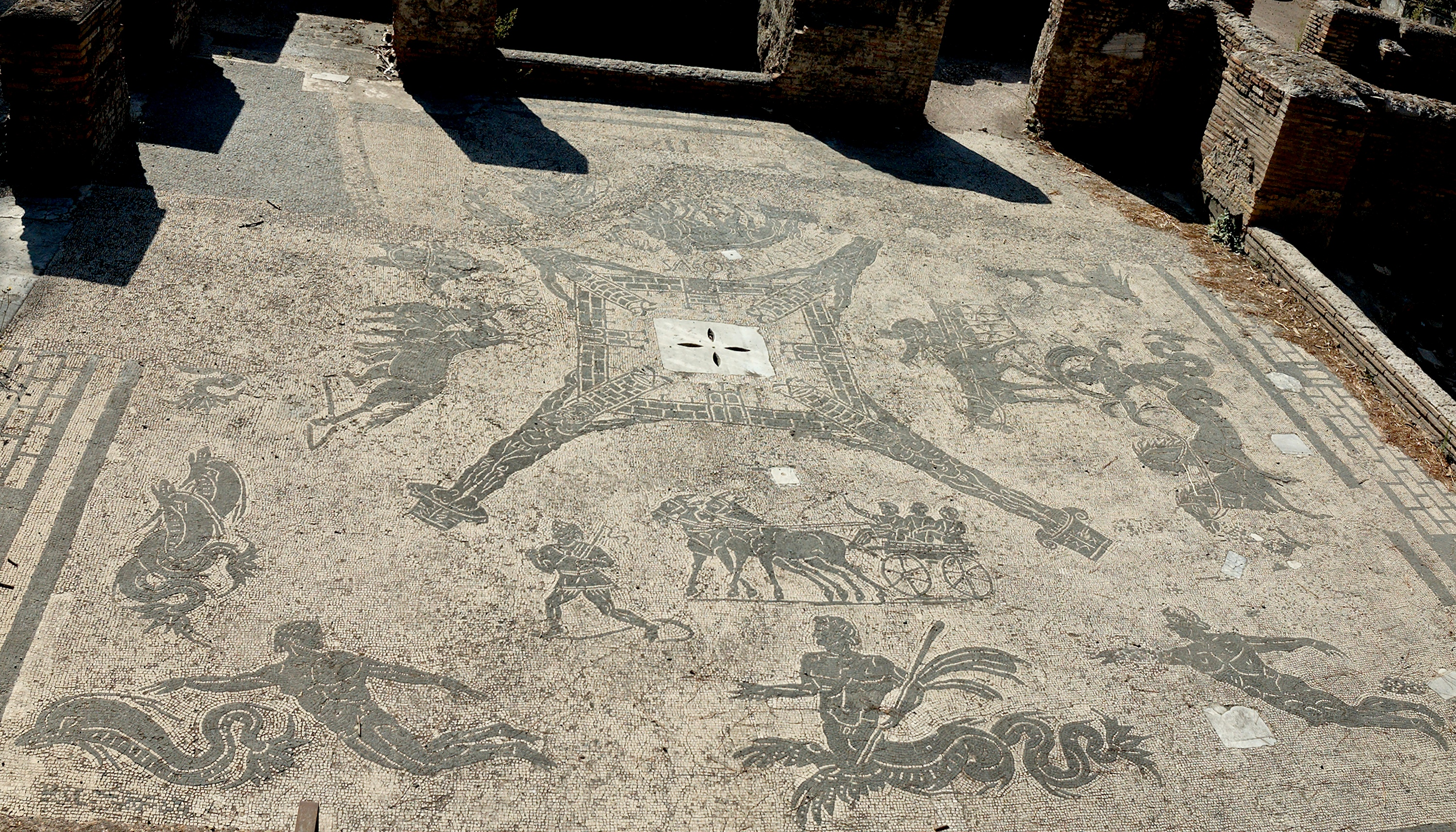
The Coachmen mosaic that gave the name to the baths

This modest bathhouse (II, II, 3) is found close to the Porta Romana and Via Ostiensis. It has been speculated that it was the guild headquarters for the Cisiarii (Latin for Coachmen) however there is no direct evidence for this besides the subject of the mosaics. The structure was built during the Hadrianic era and refurbished during the 3rd Century CE. Notable is the large black-and-white mosaic in the frigidarium which depicts two sets of walls, possibly referring to Rome and Ostia, four figures of Atlas and a set of two-wheeled wagons (in Latin cisia) drawn by mules with silly names like Pudes (Prudish), Podagrosus (Gouty), Potiscus (Thirsty?), and Barosus (Effeminate). It is this mosaic that gives the name to the bathhouse. In recent excavations, a noria (wooden water wheel) was discovered in the rooms south of the frigidarium. Enslaved people would have walked in the wheel to draw up and distribute the water needed.

=== Baths of Neptune ===
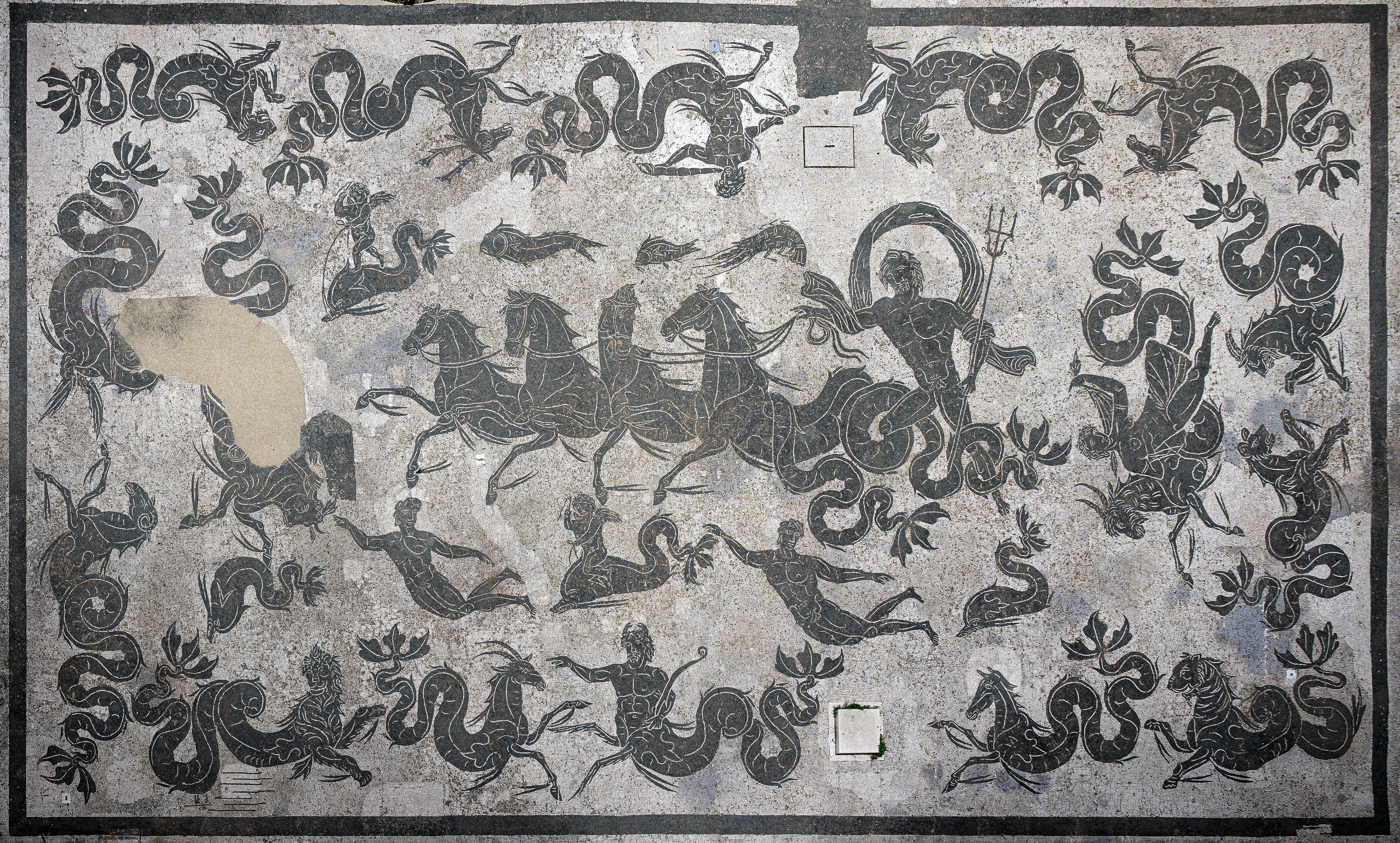
Mosaic of Neptune that gave the name to the baths

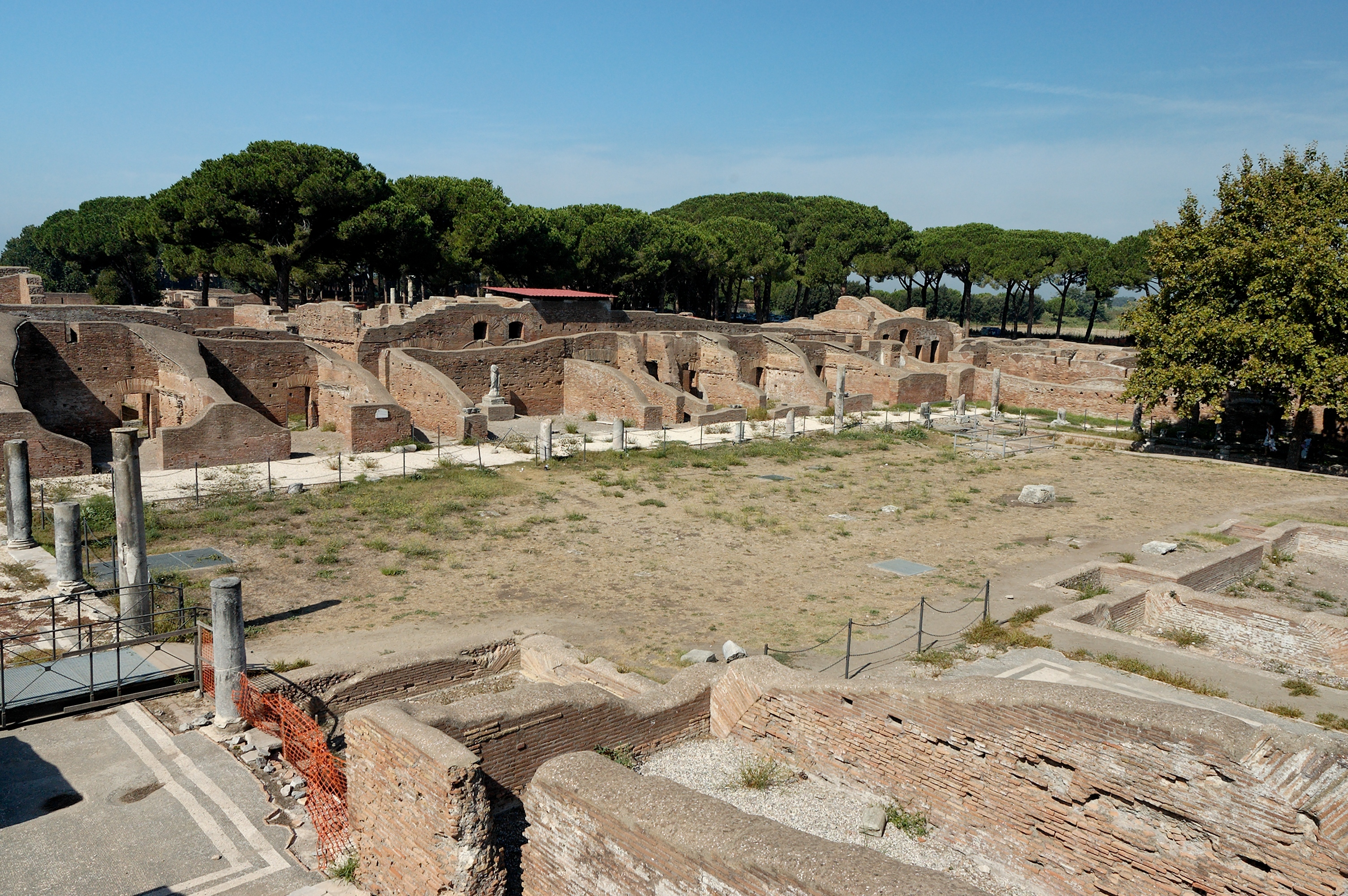
Palaestra of Bath of Neptune

East of the theater is another large square bath complex covering c. 4,400 square meters (67 meters x 67 meters) and is known as the Baths of Neptune (II, IV, 2). The structure, built late during the reign of the emperor Hadrian, was dedicated early (~139 C.E.) in the reign of Antonius Pius. At the end of the second century C.E it was restored by Gamala Iunior. The bath continued to be renovated until the 4th century C.E. The bath house is surrounded on four sides by streets and has entrances on each street. The overall design of the bathhouse was similar to those found in Pompeii, such as the Central Baths and therefore represents the next aspect of development.

Four large black-and-white figural mosaics were found here. The eponymous mosaic of Neptune riding a chariot drawn by hippocampi and surrounded by marine animals can be found after entering the bathhouse, this room is just south of the frigidarium. In an adjacent room is the mosaic of Amphitrite riding a hippocampus. The frigidarium has a mosaic of Scylla surrounded by sea divinities. The last figural mosaic is one of a group of athletes in a room to the south-east of the palaestra. There are two boxers with spiked gloves, two boxers-wrestlers, and a wrestler. None of the mosaics can be seen from any one position in the bathhouse, forcing a viewer to move through the space. The individuals in the mosaics have a three-dimensional quality to them, showing overlapping and twisting, although the scene as a whole remains flat.

The Baths of Neptune are one of the few in Ostia that contains an open-air palaestra, surrounded on three sides by marble columns. Under the palaestra was a reservoir that received water from the Julio-Claudian aqueduct and feed the bathhouses in the area. The bathhouse was constructed with a monumental facade along the Decumanus, built at the same time as the bathhouse and repaired in 350 C.E., possibly after an earthquake in 346 C.E. There is a central exedra paved with marble that had a life-sized statue of Sabina, wife of Hadrian, dressed as the goddess Ceres. The statue alludes to the role the imperial family had with this bathhouse and has been identified as a shrine for the Imperial Cult. The upper floors of the building had domestic dwellings with separate entrances.

=== Bath under the Via dei Vigili (Baths of the Provinces) ===
A small bathhouse (II, V) has been partially uncovered in the Via dei Vigili, near the barracks of the firefighters. Some archaeologists also call it the Baths of the Provinces. The construction dates to circa 50 C.E. soon after Ostia received its aqueduct. The black-and-white mosaic is the most impressive part of the structure. At its center is a group of dolphins flanked by heads that represent different Roman provinces, encircling these are images of shields and spears implicating Rome's conquering of the provinces. These remains are the earliest archaeologists have recovered of a bath complex in Osita despite epigraphic evidence suggesting some of a late Republican date.

== Regio III ==
=== Baths of the Christian Basilica ===
These baths (III, I, 2-3) were constructed during the reign of Trajan and restored sometime during the early third century C.E. It is unclear if they are related to their namesake, the neighboring Christian Basilica (III, I, 4).

=== Terme Marittime ===
These baths (III, VIII, 2) were given the wrong name by early excavators at Ostia. Originally believed to be the Thermae Marittime in CIL XIV, 137 which has since been connected to the Porta Marina Baths. These baths were started around 130 C.E., destroying a part of the Republican city walls in their construction. They underwent two more sets of renovations around 210 C.E. and in the mid-4th century C.E. The bathhouse contains several mosaics with oceanic themes. One of them shows the head of Oceanus surrounding by four smaller tritons, done to emphasise the importance of the central figure. Beyond the typical bathhouse rooms, it also contains a set of terraces that led to the sea.

=== Baths of the Seven Sages ===
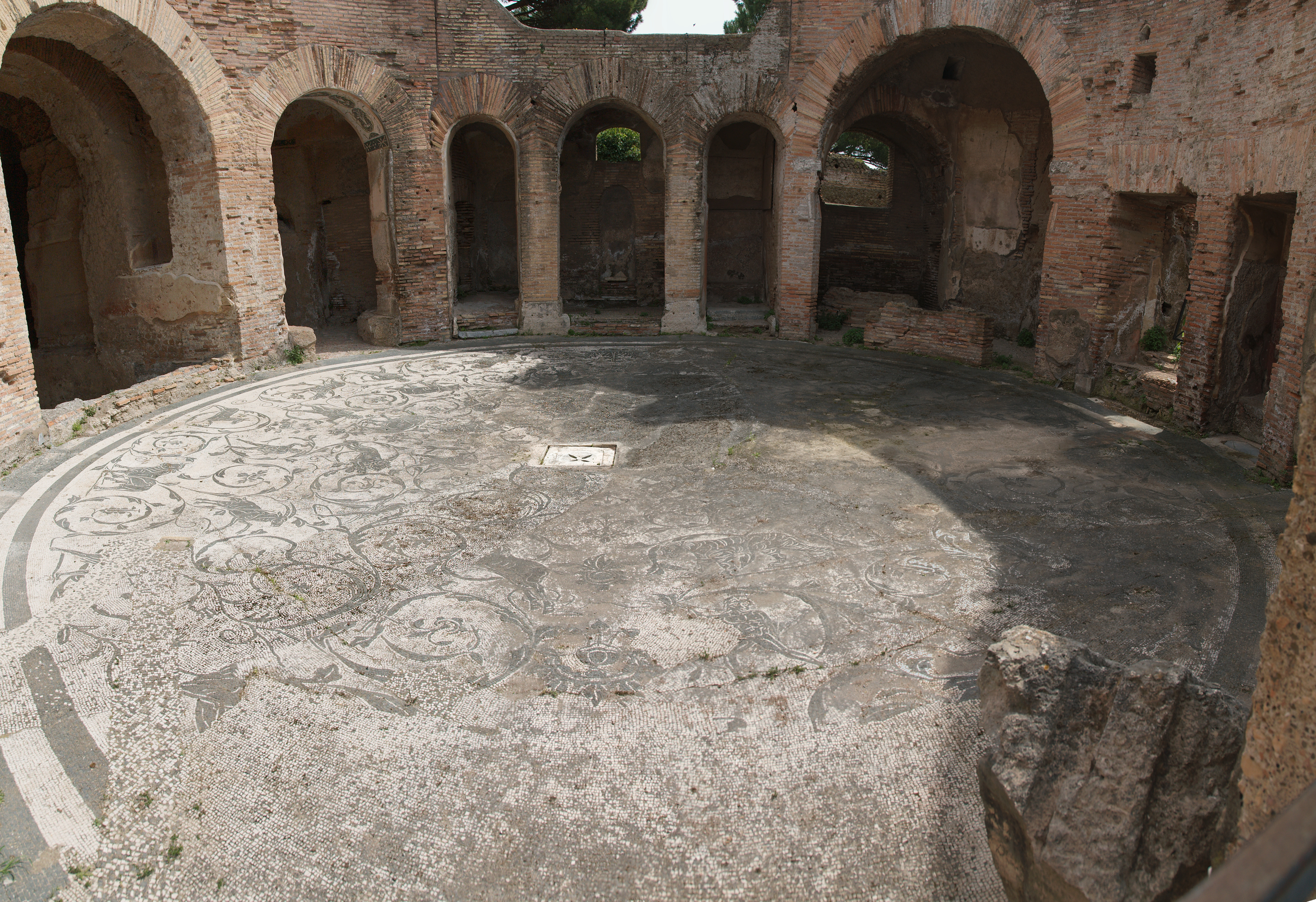
Mosaic from Round Hall of Bath of Seven Sages

This bath complex (III, X, 2) creates a city block with houses to the north and the south (House of the Charioteers and House of Serapis) from the late Hadrianic/early Antonine period. It is possible this bathhouse was only intended for the residents of the two adjoining insulae. The bath is named after a satirical painting of seven Greek philosophers found in a room that was formerly a tavern and later used as the apodyterium, the philosophers are identified by their names and city of origin written in Greek and a humorous and ironic Latin inscription referring to latrine activities. The central hall contains a mosaic with 5 concentric rings depicting hunting scenes. The room adjacent to the natatio is a fresco of Venus Anadyomene.

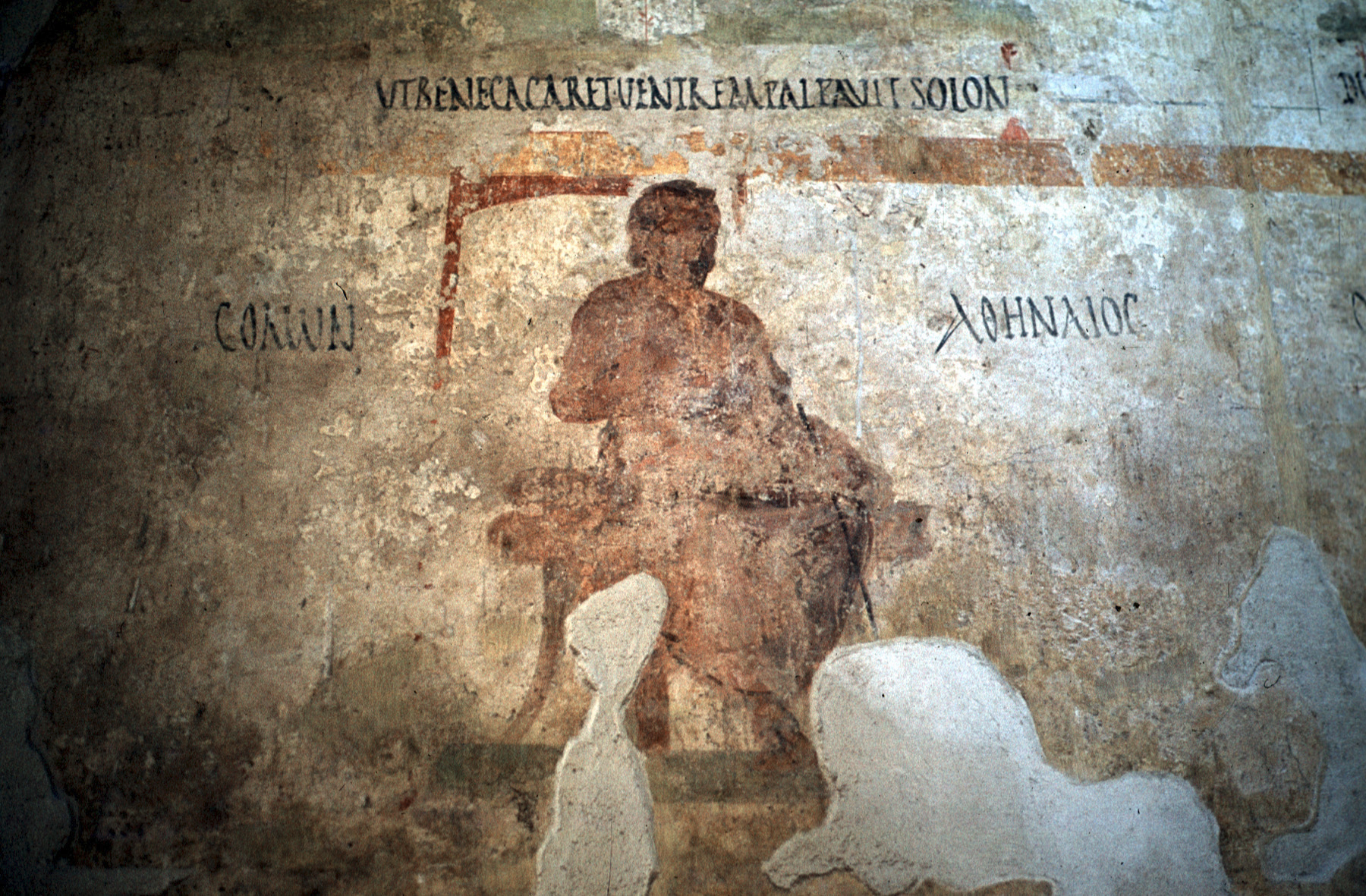
Detail of Solon from the Baths of the Seven Sages

=== Baths of Trinacria ===
These baths (III, XVI, 7) which were built at the same time as the Serapeum, were constructed during the reign of Hadrian. They were named after a mosaic found in the corridor south of the frigidarium which shows a female head with a triskeles, or three legs, behind her. The suspensurae, or raised floor, was restored during the reign of Commodus. In one of the heated rooms is a mosaic that potentially advertised where one could find prostitutes in the bathhouse. Although others suggest that it was a nickname for an unofficial youth organization.

=== Baths in Horrea III, XVII, 1 ===
This warehouse was built during the Hadrianic Period and most likely was privately owned. During the fourth century C.E. a set of rooms in the south end of the building was converted into a bath suite with mosaics. This balnea, along with several other refurbished bathhouses, served the Late Antique population of Osita.

== Regio IV (Inside the City Walls) ==
=== Baths of the Lighthouse ===
The Baths of the Lighthouse (IV, II, 1) have a long history of use, originally started during the late Trajanic/Early Hadrianic Period with renovations during the late Antonine/early Marcus Aurelian period, again during the reign of Caracalla, during the last quarter of the 3rd century C.E., and during the 5th century C.E. Flanking the entrance are shops and a thermopolium. The frigidarium contains 3rd-century frescoes of Europa and the Bull and Venus carried by Tritons and a Nereid. The namesake mosaic can be found in the floor of the frigidarium where fish and sea monsters surround a lighthouse (pharos). The lighthouse and a marine goat are the main compositional figures and they are surrounded by smaller marine creatures and black lines that represent water. Stamps on the fistulae is used as evidence that the ownership of the baths changed three times, between some Roman Senators and either Cornificia or Cornificia Minor.

=== Baths IV, V, 6 ===
These small baths were built behind a commercial building during the Antonine period. It is poorly preserved and on the edge of the excavated area.

=== Byztantine Baths ===
It is unclear why these baths (IV, IV, 8) were give this name. They are evidence of the Late Antique inhabitation of Ostia being built between 390 and 425 C.E. They were constructed in a perisytlium of the House of Jupiter the Thunderer. There are many geometric mosaics found throughout the rooms here, additional the bathhouse has 10 apses, which could be the inspiration for its modern name.

=== Baths of the Six-Columns ===
This bathhouse (IV, V, 10-11), named for the six columns found in its courtyard, was along the western half of the Decumanus. It has several phases of construction, from the first half of the 2nd century C.E. through the Severan period. A cache of republican period coins in a bronze vessel was in its foundation. Like many of the smaller bathhouses, this one was set into the existing urban fabric with bars, shops, and apartments surrounding it. There are several reservoirs underneath that supply water to the bathhouse.

== Regio IV (Outside the City Walls) ==
=== Baths of Musiciolus ===
The baths of Musiciolus (IV, XV, 2) are in the mostly unexcavated area between the Porta Marina Baths and the Synagogue. The original building was constructed during the reign of Antonius Pius, but the baths were not installed until the reign of Septimius Severus and a restructuring of the complex under Constantius II in 347-348 C.E. The structure has an entrance hall, frigidarium and four small heated rooms, in which black-and-white and polychrome geometric mosaics were discovered. The central room had a mosaic with the heads of four athletes and a referee, but that was stolen shortly after its discovery. The heads were all named, the referee was called Musiciolus ("Harmonious" and the namesake of the bathhouse), and the four athletes were called Faustus (lucky), Ursus (bear), Luxsurius (Voluptuous), and Pascentius. Faustus is shown with a victory palm, and in the small apse are a set of long jump weights and strigils and a metal oil vessel. This mosaic most likely was installed during 4th century C.E. renovations.

=== Baths of the Skeleton ===
This small bathhouse (IV, IX, 6) was a balneum built into the fabric of the house, but have only been partially excavated. The bathhouse was added during the 4th century C.E. It was named after the discovery of a human skeleton in room 15, in 2014. The only rooms that were exposed were those related to the heated rooms. A nummus of Theodosius was recovered from a secure context indicating that the bath remained in use during the first half of the 5th century C.E. until the earthquake of 442 C.E., when the structure most likely was abandoned.

=== Baths of Silenus ===
The Baths of Silenus (IV, IX, 7) were discovered in 2011 as a part of the work of the Ostia Marina Project at the University of Bologna. The 400-square meter structure was built along the ancient coastline in the extra-urban neighborhood beyond the Porta Marina Gates. Brick stamps recovered suggest an initial construction of 123-126 C.E. with later reuse during the Late Antique period of Ostia The name comes from the marble revetment depicting Silenus. The baths appear to be a part of suburban revival initiated by Hadrian in the Porta Marina area in conjunction with the Porta Marina Baths.

=== Porta Marina Baths ===
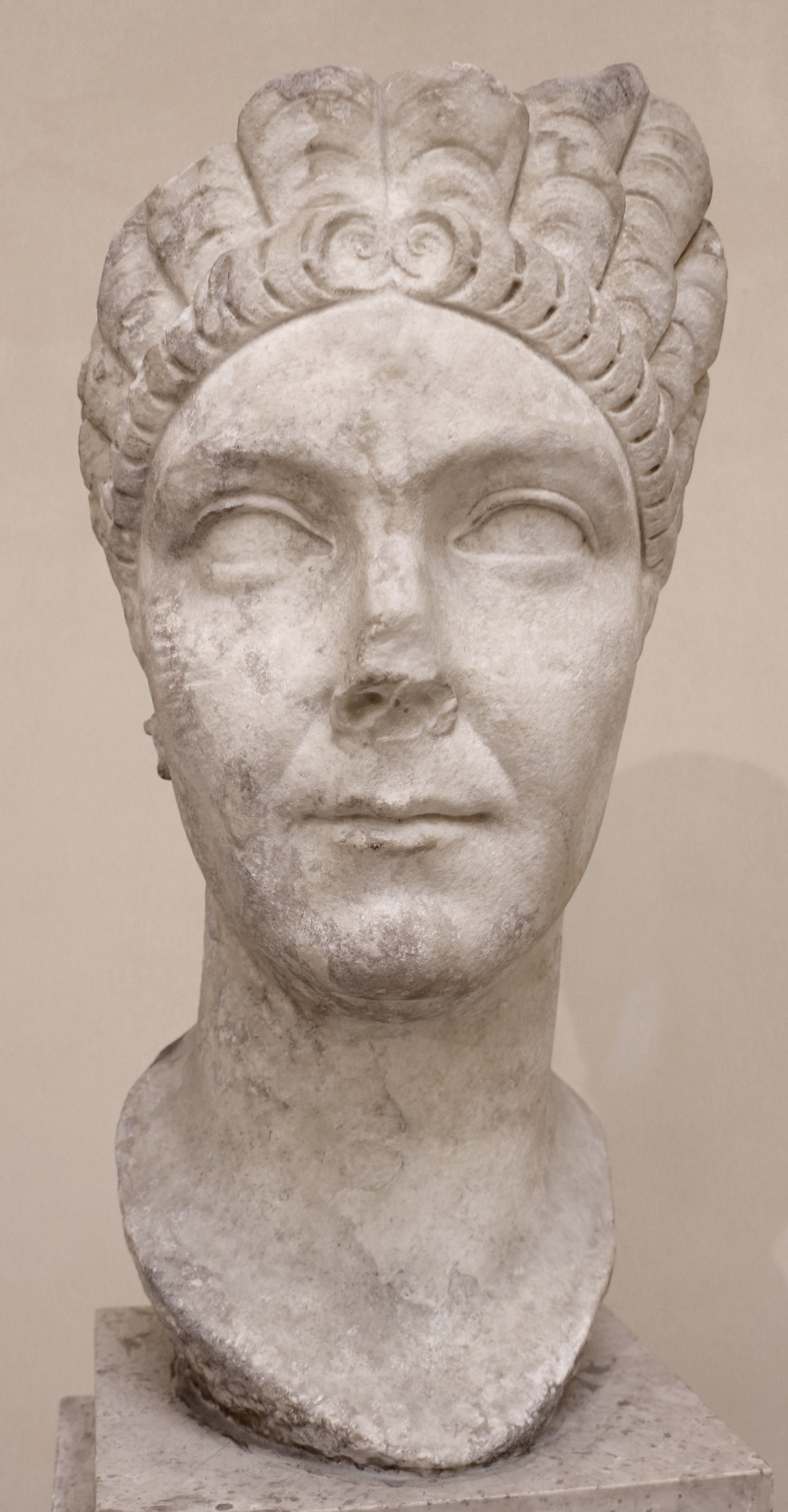
Bust of Marciana from the Porta Marina Baths

These baths have also been called by modern archaeologists both the Baths of Marciana, due to a bust of Trajan's sister being recovered there, and the thermae maritime based on epigraphic evidence. The baths were originally financed by Hadrian and Antonius Pius, they were completed in December of 138 or 139 C.E. and then renovated several times, during the 2nd century by Publius Lucilius Gamala, and in the 4th century by Proculus Gregorius, and even during the reign of Theodoric based on brick stamps recovered These renovations display the continued vitality of the extra-urban area of Ostia in the Late Antique/Early Medieval Period possibly due to the proximity of Portus.

Recent scholarship suggests that the inscription found by Gavin Hamilton and currently housed in the Vatican Museums was not about the Baths of Neptune, but instead about the Porta Marina Baths.

IMP(erator) CAESAR DIVI HADRIANI FIL(ius) DIVI TRAIANI PARTHICI NEP(os) DIVI [Nervae]
PRONEPOS T(itus) AELIVS HADRIANVS ANTONINVS AVG(ustus) PIVS PONTIF(ex) MAX(imus) TRIB(unicia) POTES[tat(e) II co(n)s(ul) II?]
THERMAS IN QVARVM EXSTRUCTIONEM DIVOS PATER SVVS ((sestertios)) XX ((centena milia)) POLLI[citus erat]
ADIECTA PECVNIA QVANTA AMPLIVS DESIDERABATVR ITEM MARMORIBVS AD OMNEM C[ultum fecit?] (CIL XIV, 98).

The Emperor Caesar, son of the deified Hadrian, grandson of Trajanus Parthicus, and great-grandson of the deified Nerva,
Titus Aelius Hadrianus Antoninus Augustus, Pontifex Maximus, with the power of tribune for the second time, consul for the second time,
delivered the baths for the construction of which his divine father had promised 2,000,000 sesterces,
after adding more money than was wished for and also marble for the entire decoration.

The baths appear to be a part of suburban revival initiated by Hadrian in the Porta Marina area in conjunction with the Baths of Silenus. They were sumptuously decorated, with many statue bases found in the frigidarium and several black-and-white mosaics with athletes in various stages of the competition and holding different prizes or pieces of equipment. A palaestra with a three-sided porticus is on the north end of the building. And the entrance halls and changing areas are decorated with mosaics showing fish and Nereids. The baths also contained sculptures of the labors of Hercules now housed in the Vatican Museum.

== Regio V ==
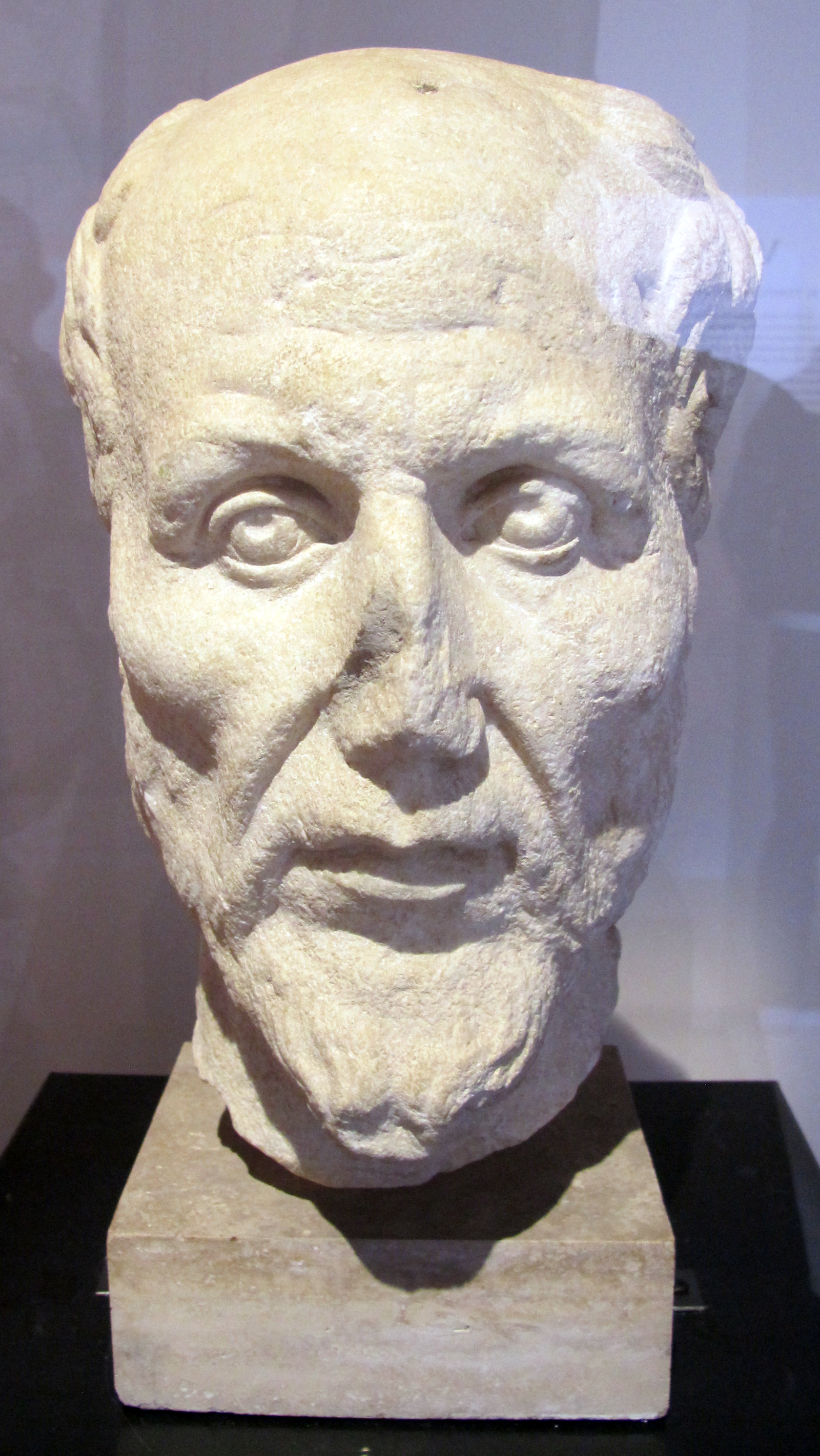
Portrait of Plotinus from Bath of the Philosopher (c.250-300 C.E.)

=== Baths of the Philosopher ===
The Baths of the Philosopher (V, II, 6-7) were built in the second half of the 3rd century C.E. into the existing fabric of a Trajanic building. Designed to take advantage of the passive heating of the sun, they are positioned on the east side of the building. The rest of the building has shops, a possible school a possible guild temple and a room that could have stored carriages. The floors and walls of the Bath of the Philosopher were decorated with marble in this structure. The building may have become the meeting place of a Neoplatonic philosophical school, since two portraits of the philosopher Plotinus were discovered here.

=== Baths of the Jealous One ===
The baths (V, V, 2), named after an inscription in a black-and-white mosaic found in an adjoining shop, were built in c. 50 C.E. and modified several times afterward, once during the Antonine period, then again in the first half of the 3rd century C.E. and finally in the 5th century C.E. The bath, like many in Ostia, is built into the urban fabric, which several shops surrounding the building. One of the bars is accessible both from the street and from the apodyterium. Several mosaics with marine themes can be seen throughout the structure (Nereid on a hippocamp in the changing rooms, an amorino riding a marine tiger in the cold bath). The palaestra can be reached from the heated rooms or a separate street entrance.

=== Baths of the Swimmer ===
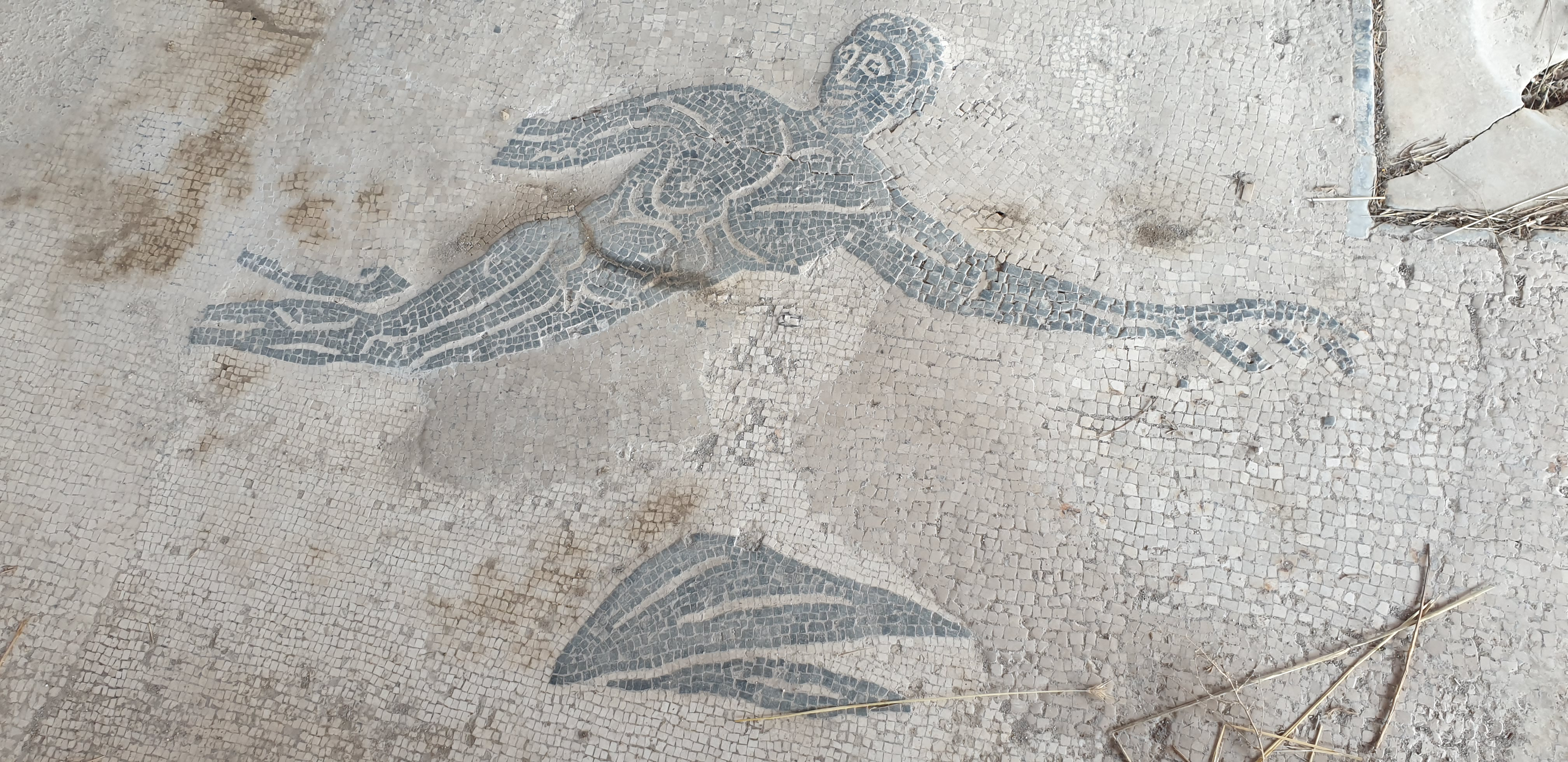
Mosaic from Baths of the Swimmer

The Baths of the Swimmer (V, X, 3) were built during the reign of Domitian between 89-90 C.E., The structure was renovated during the city-wide improvements under Hadrian and Antoninus Pius, which modifications occurring in between 180-200 C.E. and again between 230-250 C.E. In the end, the building was plundered and used as an amphorae dump. In the frigidarium is the namesake black-and-white mosaic of a city wall and a man swimming. The bathhouse was supplied by a two-story cistern on the northern wall of the building. It has been calculated based on the space of the suite of hot rooms that only about 50 people could use the bath at once, leading to an estimated 600 people per day. The bath excavations had a large impact on modern Italian Archaeology material study when Andrea Carandini divided the material up to be published on by his graduate students.

== Outside Main Excavated Area ==
=== Palazzo Imperiale ===
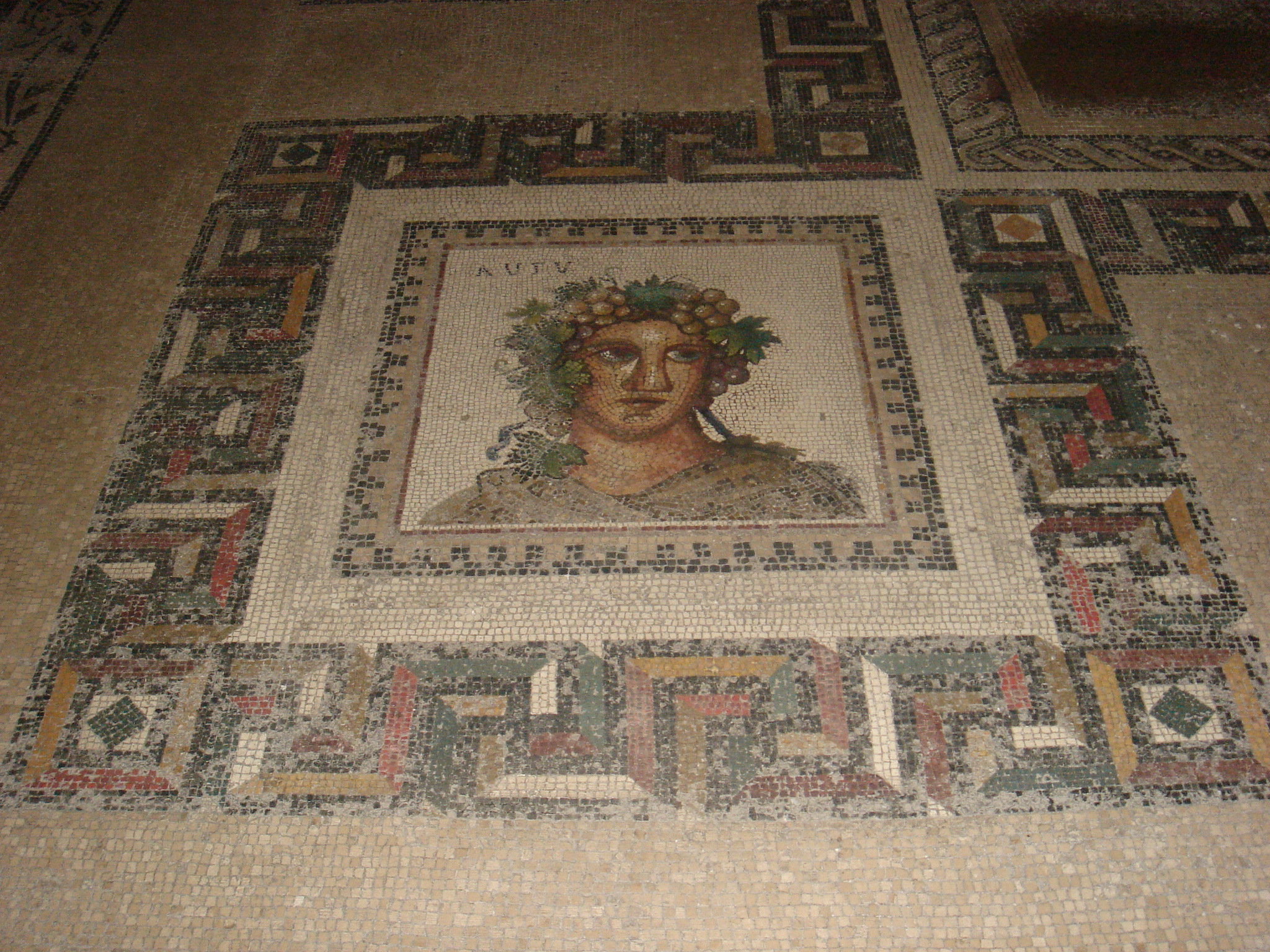
Mosaic of Autumn from Palazzo Imperiale

The so-called Imperial Palace may actually have been a multifunctional insula, as seen throughout Ostia. The remains are outside the main excavated area. The bathhouse aspect of the building was built between 145-150 C.E. and based on stamped fistulae (lead pipes) was possibly sponsored by Matidia the Younger (daughter of Matidia the Elder, a niece of Trajan), therefore it might have been known as balneum Matidiae. Almost Two dozen black-and-white and polychrome mosaics were recovered. While a number of them have been lost, several are now in the Vatican Museum.

=== Bath South of Navalia ===
Outside the traditional regions of Ostia, a small Late Antique bathhouse came to light during soundings done by the German Archaeological Institute in Rome. A set of hypocausts decorated with marble were recovered. Due to the size, it appears it was connected to a private domus, but further research is needed. A lead waterpipe, stamped with the name Clodius Celsinus Adelphius, Praefectus Urbi in 351 C.E. was recovered indicating that he built the bathhouse.

== List of Identified Baths ==
Regio I

- Forum Baths
- Baths of Buticosus
- Baths of Mithras
- Small Baths (I, XIX, 5)
- Hadrianic Bath under Forum of Heroic Statue

Regio II

- Baths of the Coachmen
- Baths of Neptune
- Baths under the Via dei Vigili (Baths of the Provinces)

Regio III

- Baths of the Christian Basilica
- Maritime Baths
- Baths of the Seven Sages
- Baths of Trinacria
- Baths in Horrea III, XVII, 1

Regio IV

- Baths of the Lighthouse
- Byzantine Baths
- Baths IV, V, 6
- Baths of the Six-Columns
- Baths of the Skeleton
- Baths of Silenus
- Porta Marina Baths
- Baths of Musiciolus

Regio V

- Baths of the Philosopher
- Baths of the Jealous One
- Baths of the Swimmer

Outside Regio

- Palazzo Imperiale
- Baths South of Navalia

== See also ==
- Ancient Roman bathing
- Thermae
- List of Roman public baths
- Ostia Antica
