= Publius Besius Betuinianus =

Roman eques

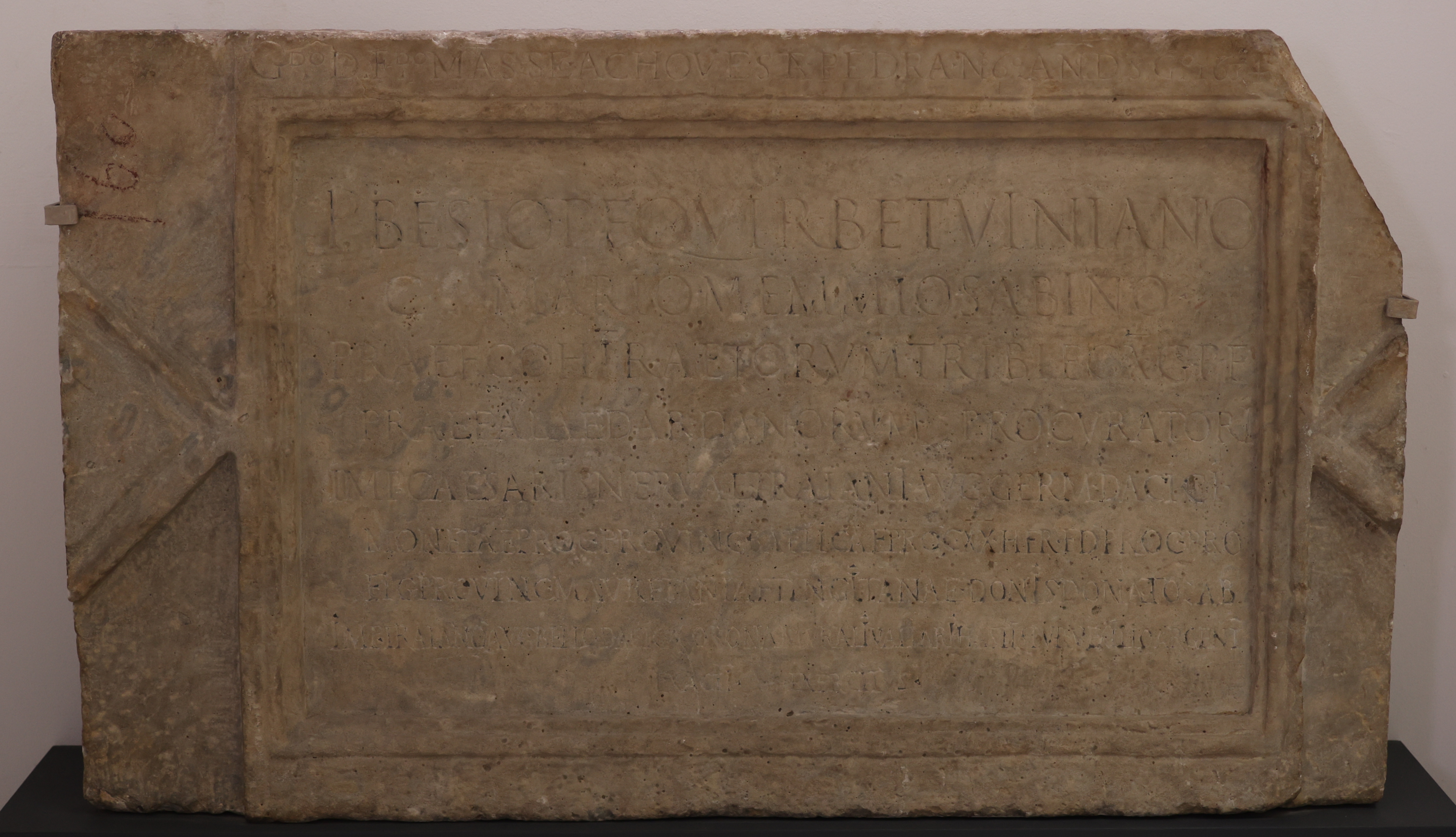
The inscription from Tangi

Publius Besius Betuinianus Gaius Marius Memmius Sabinus was a Roman eques who held a number of military and civilian positions during the reign of the Emperor Trajan, and was twice decorated for his actions in battle. He is only known from inscriptions.

Our primary source for the life of Betuinianus is an inscription from Tangi (modern Tangiers, Morocco). It was found there by Fernando de Mascarenhas, Count of Torre, who was the Portuguese Governor of Tangiers from 1628 to 1637; his name is cut in the frame of the inscription with the date of its discovery, 1634. He took the stone to his castle, where it was seen by T. Smith in 1668; it was later purchased by Sir Hugh Cholmley who presented it to Oxford University. Currently part of the collection of the Ashmolean Museum, the inscription is on display in the Randolph Gallery.

From this inscription we know his father's name is Publius, and that Betuinianus belonged to the Quirina voting tribe. His first attested appointment was his commission as praefectus or commander of cohort I Raetorum, whose official station was in Germania Inferior, but had been assigned to the Roman forces in Trajan's First Dacian War (AD 101–102). After the conclusion of that war, he was commissioned military tribune with Legio X Gemina, at the time also stationed in Germania Inferior. He was then commissioned praefectus of the ala Dardanorum, which took part in Trajan's Second Dacian War (105-106). For his valor in these conflicts, Betuinianus received dona militaria: the corona muralis and corona vallaris (mural and camp crowns), hastae purae (headless or "pure" spears), and a vexillus argentus (a silver staff). These are an unusually generous amount of decorations, far in excess of any other known case of a man passing through his tres militiae. Valerie Maxfield argues that "it would not be going beyond the evidence to see these dona as a total for two campaigns rather than as a single award", and allocates them thus: "One decoration as Praefectus cohortis and one as praefectus equitum, the first with one crown and one hasta, the second with one crown, one hasta and one vexillum (the same as that received by the only other praefectus equitum known to have been decorated at this period)".

Concluding his tres militiae, Betuinianus then held a series of civilian administrative appointments. The first was as procurator or overseer of the imperial mint with a salary of 100,000 sesterces; he was then promoted to procurator of the imperial properties in Baetica, with a salary of 200,000 sesterces. This was followed by his appointment as procurator vicesima hereditatium or overseer of the 5% estate tax at Rome. The latest appointment was as procurator with the powers of a legatus of the province of Mauretania Tingitana; having the powers of a legatus implies Betuinianus was given command of legionary troops stationed in that province. J. E. H. Spaul dates his tenure in that province before 114, most likely from 112 to 114; Spaul further believes, based on the nature of the inscription and that it was set up by his staff, that Besius Betuinianus died while in office.
