= Quintus Caecilius Redditus =

Ancient Roman equite

Quintus Caecilius Redditus was a Roman eques who held a number of appointments during the reigns of the Emperors Trajan and Hadrian. He is known in a series of inscriptions.

The earliest known appointment Redditus is known to have held was as commander of Cohors I Montanorum in 102, then stationed in Pannonia. By 12 January 105, he had received another commission, this time as military tribune of the Cohors I Britannica milliaria civium Romanorum, which was stationed in Moesia Superior. We can surmise he was commissioned praefectus of an ala, for an inscription from Troesmis in Moesia Inferior congratulates Redditus on having completed his tres militiae and having been appointed procurator.

A pair of inscriptions attest that Redditus was procurator or governor of Mauretania Tingitana from 120 or before to at least 122. Hadrian or his representative must have found Redittus' service in this appointment acceptable, for an inscription found in Celeia, attests that he was then Procurator Augusti of Noricum.

We lack evidence for the life of Caecilius Redditus after he completed his term in Noricum.

== See also ==
- List of Roman governors of Mauretania Tingitana
