= Pasohlávky =

- Municipality
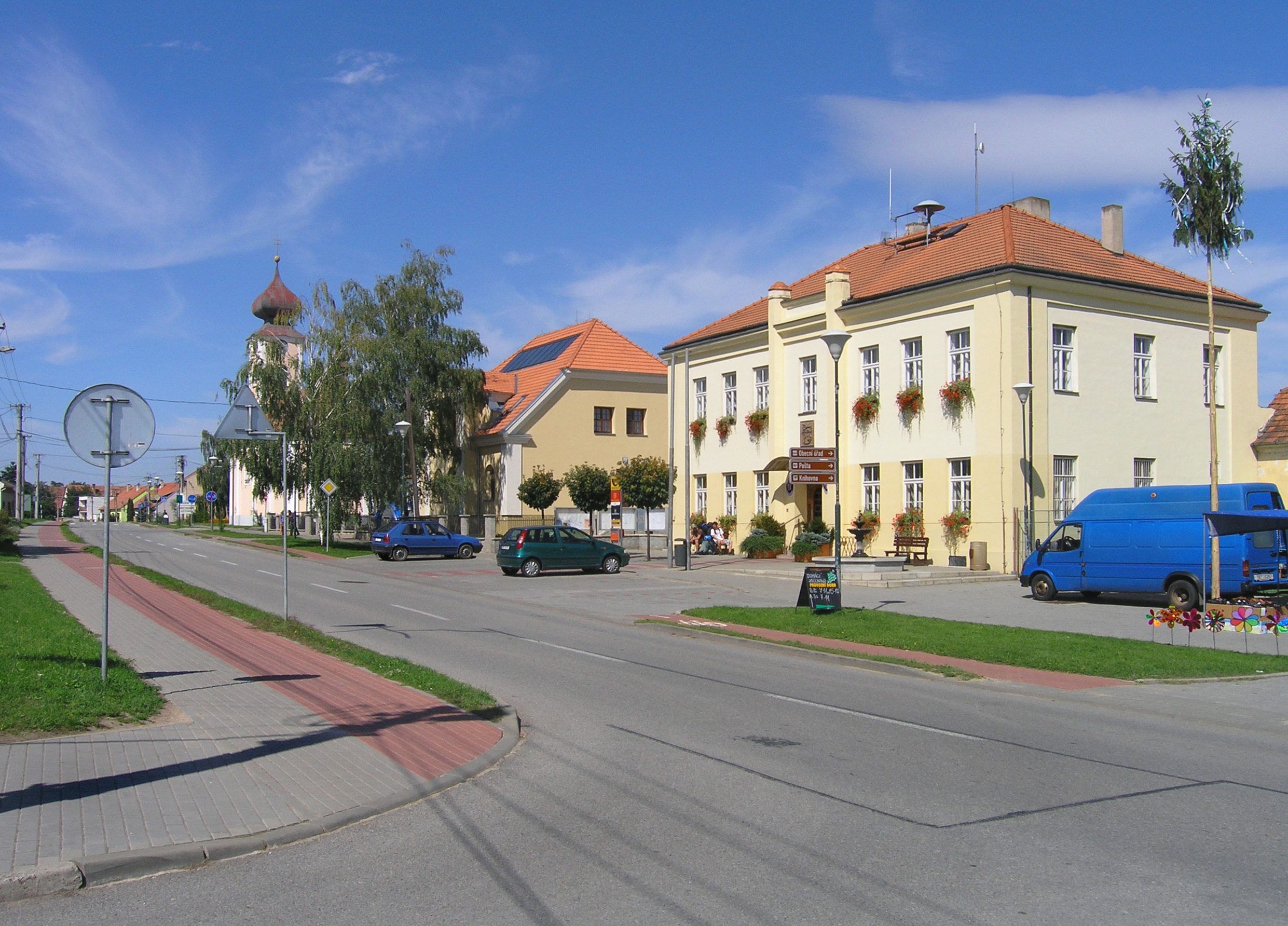
- Main street with the municipal office

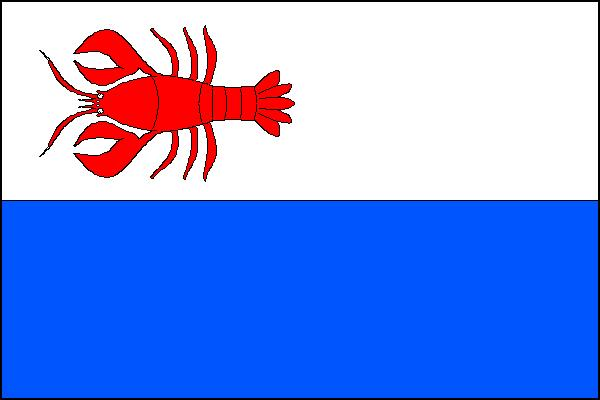
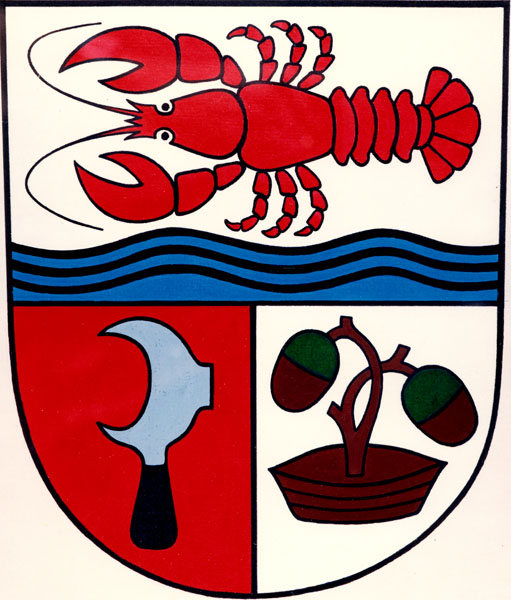
- Flag Coat of arms

- Location in the Czech Republic
- Coordinates: 48°54′11″N 16°32′37″E
- Country: Czech Republic
- Region: South Moravian
- District: Brno-Country
- First mentioned: 1276

Area
  - Total: 26.66 km^{2} (10.29 sq mi)
- Elevation: 175 m (574 ft)

Population (2026-01-01)
  - Total: 781
  - Density: 29.3/km^{2} (75.9/sq mi)
- Time zone: UTC+1 (CET)
  - Summer (DST): UTC+2 (CEST)
- Postal code: 691 22
- Website: www.pasohlavky.cz

Pasohlávky (German: Weißstätten) is a municipality and village in Brno-Country District in the South Moravian Region of the Czech Republic. It has about 800 inhabitants. It is a summer resort at the Nové Mlýny Reservoir.

== Geography ==
Pasohlávky is located about 31 kilometres (19 mi) south of Brno. It lies in the Dyje–Svratka Valley. The highest point is the hill Hradisko at 221 m (725 ft) above sea level. The municipality is situated on the northwestern shore of the Nové Mlýny Reservoir.

== History ==
The first written mention of Pasohlávky is from 1276, under its original name Uherčice na Bílém břehu. Because of the construction of the Nové Mlýny reservoirs, the area of the neighbouring Mušov was joined to Pasohlávky on 1 January 1980 and most of the Mušov's inhabitants moved to Pasohlávky. The area of Mušov was subsequently flooded.

== Demographics ==
Historical population

| Year | Pop. | ±% |
|---|---|---|
| 1869 | 1,354 | — |
| 1880 | 1,507 | +11.3% |
| 1890 | 1,668 | +10.7% |
| 1900 | 1,624 | −2.6% |
| 1910 | 1,735 | +6.8% |

| Year | Pop. | ±% |
|---|---|---|
| 1921 | 1,762 | +1.6% |
| 1930 | 1,751 | −0.6% |
| 1950 | 841 | −52.0% |
| 1961 | 982 | +16.8% |
| 1970 | 884 | −10.0% |

| Year | Pop. | ±% |
|---|---|---|
| 1980 | 595 | −32.7% |
| 1991 | 672 | +12.9% |
| 2001 | 735 | +9.4% |
| 2011 | 694 | −5.6% |
| 2021 | 687 | −1.0% |

Source: Censuses

== Transport ==
The I/52 road (continuation of the D52 motorway from Brno to Mikulov, part of the European route E461) runs through the municipality.

== Sights ==
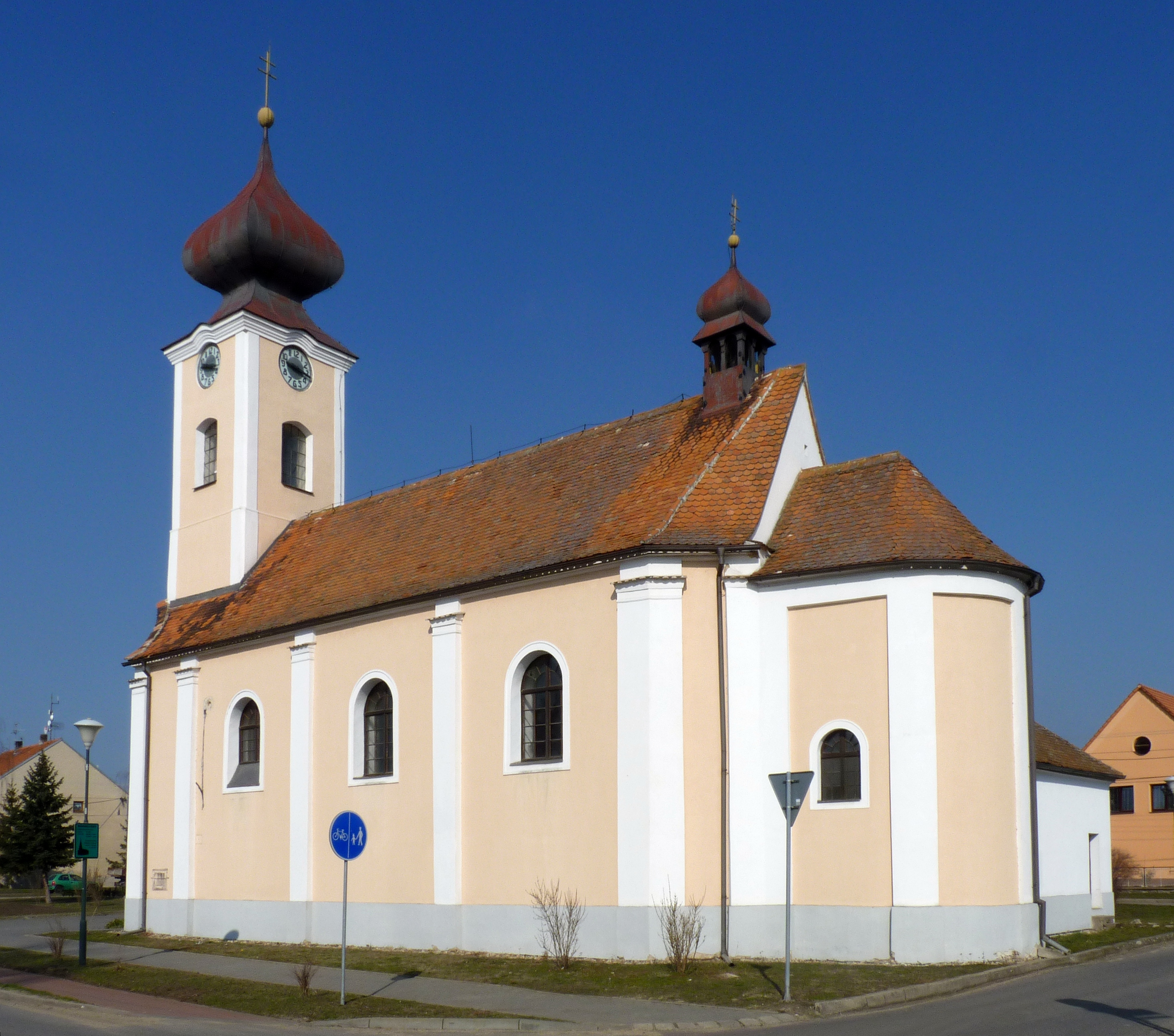
Church of Saint Anne

The areas of Pasohlávky and Mušov are important archaeological sites. There are 28 known archaeological sites in the former Mušov and 21 in Pasohlávky. Remains of a permanent Roman fortress from the 2nd century have been explored here. There is a museum with an exhibition dedicated to the Roman people and local discoveries.

The Church of Saint Anne was originally a chapel, rebuilt in 1675 and extended to a church in 1811. In 1818, the tower was added.

On the island in the Nové Mlýny Reservoir is the last remnant of Mušov, the Church of Saint Leonard of Noblac. The originally Romanesque church from the late 12th or early 13th century was rebuilt in the Gothic style in the 14th century.

Aqualand Moravia in Pasohlávky is a water park that is the most visited tourist destination in the South Moravian Region.
