= Marcus Gavius Maximus =

Roman civil official and military officer (died 156)

Marcus Gavius Maximus (died 156) was an eques of ancient Rome who held several imperial positions, both civil and military, under Hadrian and Antoninus Pius.

Firmum in northern Italy is considered his hometown, confirmed by the fact that his voting tribe, Palatina, is found there. His filiation records his father's praenomen, Marcus.

We know that he and the advocate Marcus Cornelius Fronto were acquaintances, if not friends: Fronto was made primary heir and executor of the will of Gaius Censorius Niger who had included unflattering comments about both Gavius Maximus and the emperor. Fronto wrote apologetic letters to both men concerning the will, stating he had little choice in reading those comments out loud.

== Career ==
Although it can be assumed Gavius Maximus passed through the tres militiae, which was the usual manner most equites began their careers, the first office attested for him is procurator or governor of Mauretania Tingitana; Anthony Birley believes Hadrian appointed him to that post in 128, and Maximus governed there until 132. While governor, he was one of several governors to receive an imperial rescript from Hadrian concerning how to handle witnesses that is preserved in the Digest. Maximus next appears as procurator of the province of Asia, where he may have come to the attention of Antoninus Pius, who was proconsul of that Senatorial province in 134/135. Antoninus Pius later appointed him praetorian prefect, as the colleague of Marcus Petronius Mamertinus; this was one of the highest offices an eques could hold.

According to the Historia Augusta, Maximus was praetorian prefect for twenty years. There is independent evidence attesting that he was prefect between 139 and 143; Gaius Tattius Maximus, who succeeded him upon his death, is attested as holding the appointment no earlier than 156. This would confirm the Historia Augusta about this claim, and indicates that Maximus had the longest tenure as praetorian prefect of any man appointed to that office.

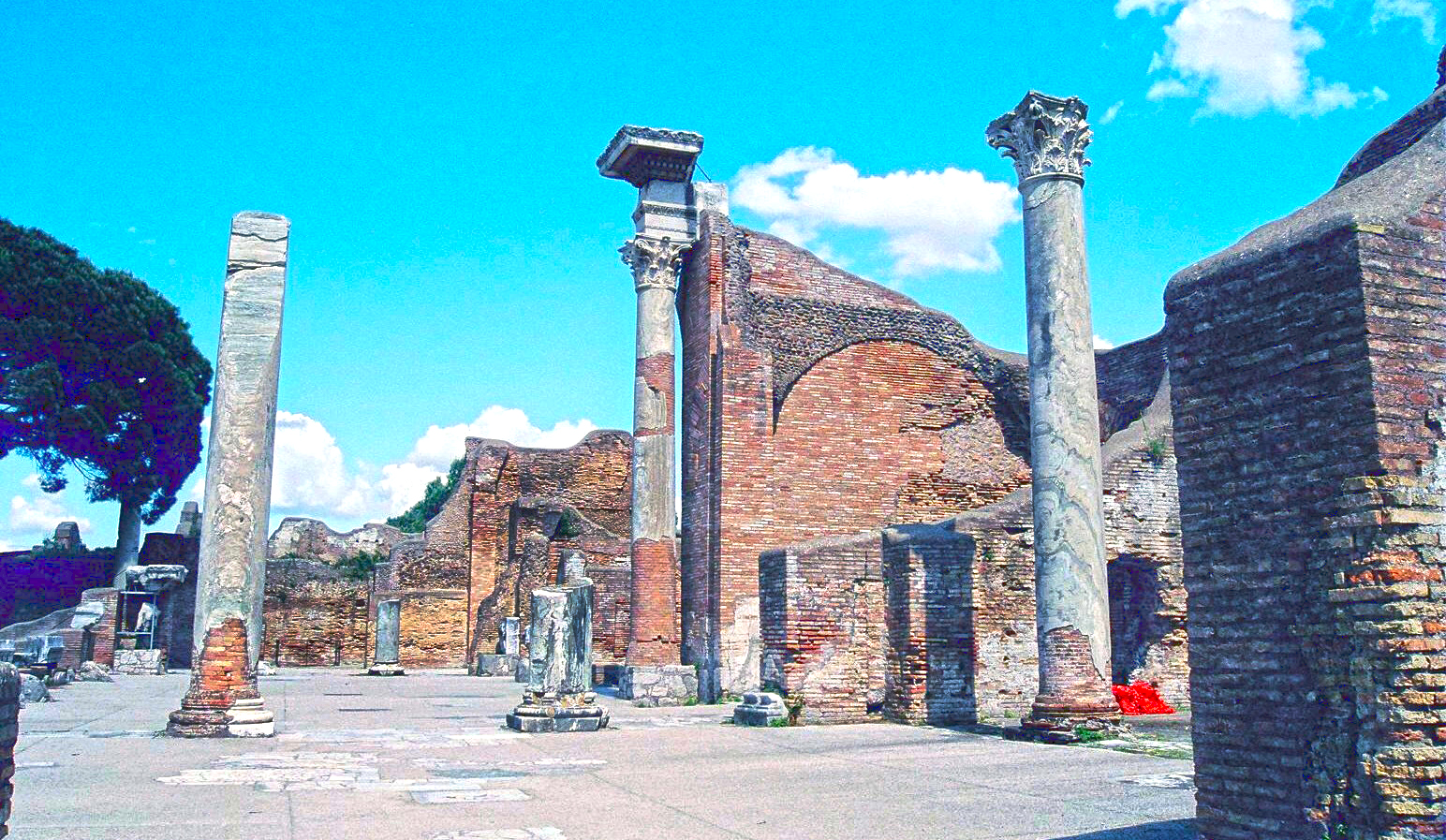
The Civic Baths of Ostia, also known as Thermae Gavii Maximi

While the Historia Augusta also describes Maximus as a harsh man, he is known as a benefactor to the port city of Ostia Antica, gifting the city the lavish civic baths. "It is difficult to know what to make of this," writes Guy de la Bédoyère. "Why Gavius Maximus would have wanted to needed to pay for the baths, or indeed how he became wealthy enough to fund them, is unknown. Civic munificence was virtually ubiquitous in the Roman world but we know of no particular connection that Gavius Maximus had with the port town."

== See also ==
- List of Roman governors of Mauretania Tingitana
