= Legio X Gemina =

Roman legion

- Map of the Roman Empire in AD 125, under emperor Hadrian, showing the Legio X Gemina, stationed on the river Danube at Vindobona (Vienna, Austria), in Pannonia Superior province, from AD 103 until the 5th century
- Active: Before 58 BC to sometime in the 5th century
- Country: Roman Republic and Roman Empire
- Type: Roman legion (Marian)
- Role: Infantry assault (some cavalry support)
- Size: Varied over unit lifetime. Approx. 3,500 fighting men + support at the time of creation. Expanded and given the cognomen Gemina in 31 BC.
- Garrison/HQ: Hispania Tarraconensis (31 BC – c. 71); Nijmegen (71–103); Vienna (103–5th century)
- Nicknames: Equestris, "Of the knights" under Caesar; Gemina, "The twin" (since 31 BC); Pia Fidelis, "faithful and loyal" (since 89); Domitiana, Antoniniana, Gordiana, Deciana, Floriana, Cariniana (short-lived); Pia VI Fidelis VI (after 260)
- Mascot: Bull
- Engagements: (As Equestris) Gallic Wars (58–51 BC); Battle against the Nervians (57 BC); Battle of Gergovia (52 BC); Battle of Ilerda (49 BC); Battle of Dyrrhachium (48 BC); Battle of Pharsalus (48 BC); Battle of Munda (45 BC) (As just Legio X) Battle of Philippi (42 BC); Battle of Actium (31 BC) (As Gemina) Batavian rebellion (70); Second Battle of Tapae (101); Bar Kokhba's revolt (132–135); Marcomannic Wars in Moravia(168–180); Naissus (268); Vexillationes of the 10th participated in many other campaigns.

Commanders
- Notable commanders: Julius Caesar, Mark Antony

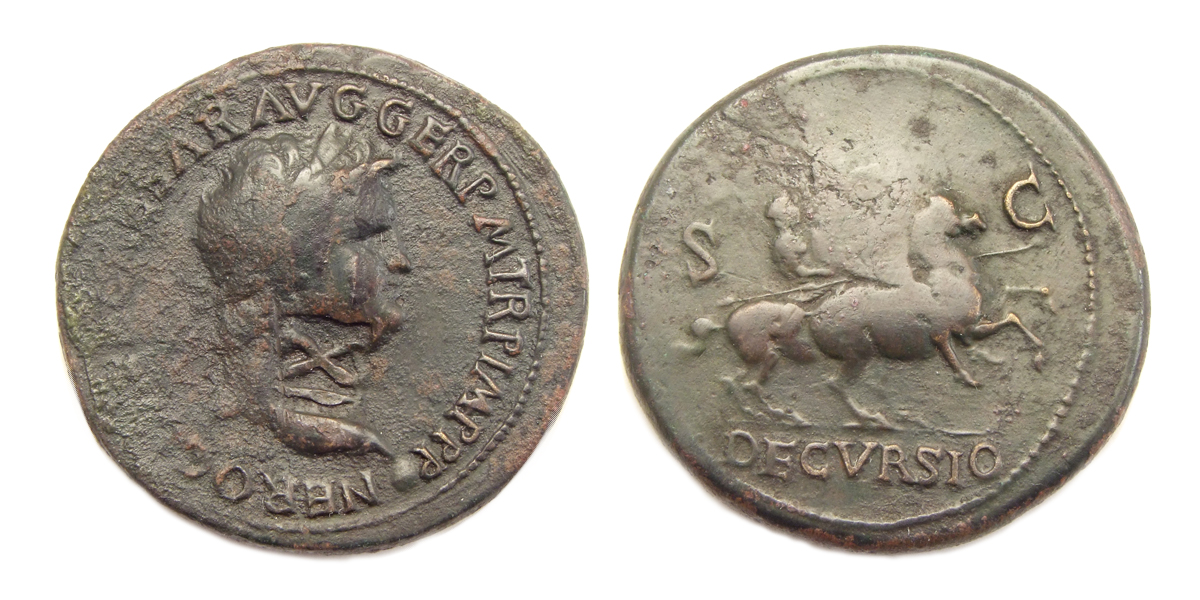
Nero, Sestertius with countermark "X" of Legio X Gemina. Obv: Laureate bust right. Rev: Nero riding horse right, holding spear, DECVRSIO in exergue; S C across fields.

Legio X Gemina ("10th Twin(s) Legion" in English), was a Roman legion, which was active during the late Roman Republic and later the Roman Empire as part of the Imperial Roman army. It was one of the four legions used by Julius Caesar in 58 BC, during the Roman invasion of Gaul. After being briefly disbanded, the legion was reconstituted by Augustus (also known as Octavian) and fought on the side of the Second Triumvirate during the Liberators' Civil War and later on the side of Augustus during the War of Actium which ended the Crisis of the Roman Republic. The legion remained active for centuries, with surviving records of its continued existence in Vienna as late as the 5th century AD. The legion's symbol was a bull. Early on in its history, the legion was called X Equestris (mounted), because Caesar once used the legionaries as cavalry.

== Etymology ==
In the Latin, gemina, "twin, double, both, similar," is an adjective in the feminine complementing the grammatical gender of the noun it modifies, legio. "The Double Legion" indicates it was activated by combining two former legions

== In Republican Service ==
=== Gallic Wars ===
See also Legio X Equestris

In the Gallic Wars, X Equestris played an important role on Caesar's military success and for this reason is sometimes said to be his favorite. In Caesar's campaigns they were present in the battle of the Sabis, the invasions of Britain, and the battle of Gergovia. They remained faithful to Caesar in the civil war against Pompey, being present in the battles of Pharsalus (49 BC) and Munda (45 BC). In 45 BC Caesar disbanded the legion, giving the veterans farmlands near Narbonne in Gaul and in Hispania.

=== Augustus ===
The legion was reconstituted in 42 BC and fought for Augustus (commonly referred to by Octavian by historians), Lepidus and Mark Antony in the Battle of Philippi against the murderers of Caesar. After this, they followed Mark Antony in his campaign against Parthia and were defeated with him at Actium. Augustus then took control of the legion and settled the veterans in Patras. The legion rebelled and lost its cognomen Equestris as punishment. Replacements were added from other legions, and the Tenth was rebaptized Gemina.

== In Imperial Service ==
From about 30 BC the newly formed X Gemina was relocated to Petavonium in Hispania Tarraconensis, where Augustus was preparing a campaign against the Cantabrians. Their veterans were among the first inhabitants of modern Zaragoza and Emerita Augusta, modern Mérida.

The legion was sent to Carnuntum in Pannonia in about 63 AD (or a bit earlier) after legio XV Apollinaris left and went to the east. During the brief reign of Galba (68-69), it was transferred back to Hispania.

=== Under the Flavian dynasty ===
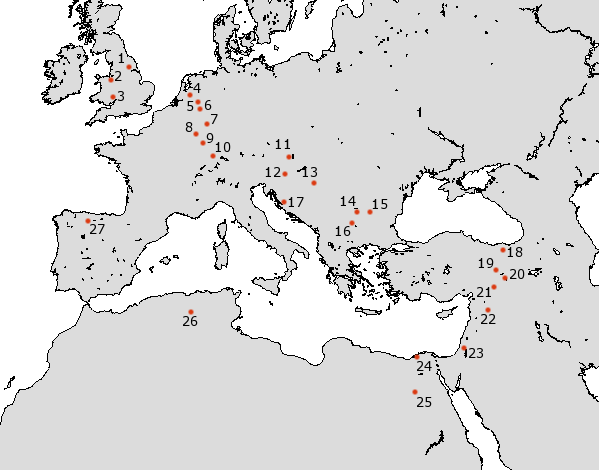
Position of Roman legions in 80. X Gemina was in Nijmegen (mark 4), with XXII Primigenia.

However, its stay in Hispania was to be very brief. In 70, after the Batavian rebellion was suppressed by the new emperor Vespasian, X Gemina was sent to Batavia in Germania Inferior to police the lands and prevent new revolts. From 71 to 103, the legion was stationed at the base built by II Adiutrix near Oppidum Batavorum, the present day Dutch city of Nijmegen.

As part of the army of Germania Inferior, X Gemina fought against the rebellion of the governor of Germania Superior, L. Antonius Saturninus, against Emperor Domitian. For this reason, the Tenth — as well as the other legions of the army, I Minervia, VI Victrix, and XXII Primigenia — received the title Pia Fidelis Domitiana, "faithful and loyal to Domitian", with the reference to the Emperor dropped at his death and subsequent damnatio memoriae.

=== 2nd century ===
During Trajan's first campaign in Dacia (101–102), the legion participated at the Second Battle of Tapae, fighting against the army of the Dacians led by King Decebalus.

In 103, it was moved to Aquincum and later to Vindobona (modern Vienna), in Pannonia Superior, which would be the legion's camp until the 5th century.

Vexillationes of the X Gemina fought against the rebellion of Simon bar Kokhba in 132-135, in Iudaea, others participated in the Parthian campaign of Lucius Verus in 162. Another major campaign was the one fought against the Quadi, Marcomanni and the Lombards, in Moravia, (Dyje-Svratka Vale) under the command of Emperor Marcus Aurelius (168-180). A garrison of Legio X GPF was found in the Czech Republic in Roman fortress in Moravia (Mušov)

X Gemina supported its governor, Septimius Severus, in his bid for purple, and many men of the legion went to Rome to become part of the Praetorian Guard of the new Emperor.

=== 3rd century ===
During the 3rd century, the legion fought for several emperors, who awarded the legion with titles showing the fidelity of the legion and the favour gained by the Emperor himself. The titles Antoniniana (awarded by Caracalla or Elagabalus), Gordiana (by Gordian III), Deciana (by Decius), Floriana (by Florianus), and Cariniana (by Carinus) were short-lived, however, and dropped after the death of the Emperor. For its support of Emperor Gallienus against Postumus, the Gemina was awarded the title Pia VI Fidelis VI, "six times faithful, six times loyal".

=== 4th century ===
At the time in which Notitia Dignitatum was written (late 4th century), the first detachment of Decima Gemina was under the command of the Magister Militum per Orientem, and was a comitatensis unit. The other detachment was still in Vindobona, under the command of the Dux Pannoniae primae et Norici ripensis.

== Attested members ==
Name	Rank	Time frame	Province	Source
Marcus Titius Lustricus Bruttianus	legatus legionis	between 98 and 108	Pannonia Superior	
Quintus Lollius Urbicus	legatus legionis	c. 130	Pannonia Superior	CIL VIII, 6706
Titus Caesernius Quinctianus	legatus legionis	between 133 and 136	Pannonia Superior	CIL V, 865
Publius Julius Geminius Marcianus	legatus legionis	?157-?160	Pannonia Superior	CIL VIII, 7050
Titus Aelius Aurelius Epianus	legatus legionis	end 2nd century	Pannonia Superior	CIL XIV, 2164
Gaius Luxilius Sabinus	legatus legionis	between 231 and 270		CIL XI, 6338
Gaius Pontius C.f. Paeligno	tribunus angusticlavius	before 22		CIL V, 4348 = ILS 942
Publius Besius Betuinianus	tribunus angusticlavius	between 102 and 105	Pannonia Superior	CIL VIII, 9990 = ILS 1352
Titus Prifernius P.f. Paetus Memmius Apollinaris	tribunus angusticlavius	before 106	Pannonia Superior	CIL IX, 4753 = ILS 1350
Sextus Attius Senecio	tribunus angusticlavius	c. 140	Judea	CIL VI, 3505
[...]us L.f. Annianus	tribunus laticlavius	c. 232	Pannonia Superior	CIL XIII, 6763
Gaius Junius Tiberianus	tribunus laticlavius	c. 249	Pannonia Superior	

== Epigraphic evidence ==
- - Lucius Lavius Luci filius Aemilia tri(bu) Tuscus Felicitis Iulia miles legionis X Geminae Victricis- Porto (Portus), Portugal. AE 1953, 268.
- - sacrum Caius Valerius Carus miles legionis X Geminae votum solvit libens merito. Lugo (Lucus Augusti), Spain. Hisp. Epi. 19118.
- - Caius Iulius Sergia Hispali (f) Victor miles legionis X Gemina (centuria Fabi Celtiberi annorum XLII aerum / XVIII hic (...). Pontevedra, Spain. CIL II 2545.
- - Iovi Augusto Ultori sacrum Lucius Valerius Paternus miles legionis X Geminae optio centuria Censoris exs (...). Pontevedra, Spain. AE 1908, 147.
- - Gaius Iulius Primus miles veteranus legionis X Geminae / hic situs estsit tibi terra levis. Jaen, Andalucía, Spain. CIL II2/5, 5.
- - Dis Manibus Gaio Urbanio Firmino militi legionis X / Iulius Ingenuus miles legionis. Jaen, Andalucía, Spain. CIL II 1691
- - Capito Sunnae filius decurio equitum alae geminae legionis X Rustica Galli filia. Sevilla (Hispalis), Spain.CIL II2/5, 1136.
- - Publius Talius Quinti filius Papiria (tribu) legionis X hic situs est sit tibi terra (...). Beja (Pax Iulia), Portugal. Hisp. Epi. 23031.
- - Marcus Aurelius Marci filius Galeria (tribu) Abbicus miles legionis X decimae. Beja (Pax Iulia), Portugal. AE 1980, 562.
- - Lucius Octavius Luci filius Pupinia (tribu) Baeterensis Magius annorum XXXVII / aerorum XIX tubicen / miles legionis X Geminae(...). Astorga (Asturica), Spain. AE 1928, 163.
- - Caius Pelgus Luci filius Scaptia (tribu) Clemens veteranus legionis) X Geminae vixit annos LVI hic situs est/ Caius Pelgus (...). Astorga (Asturica), Spain. CIL II 5076 = CIL II 5662 = AE 1904, 160.
- - Caius Coelius Cai filius Papiria (tribu) Valens Narniense miles legionis X Geminae centuria Castellani annorum XXXV aerorum XIII (...). Astorga (Asturica), Spain. IRPLe 79.
- - Marcus Persius Marci filius Pollia (tribu) Blaesus domo Hasta miles legionis X Geminae centuria (...). Astorga (Asturica), Spain. AE 1904, 160.
- - Lucius Herennius Luci filius) Galeria (tribu) Callicus domo Ugia miles legionis X Geminae / centuria Licini Clementis annorum / (...). Zamora, Spain. CIL II 5076 = CIL II 5662 = AE 1904, 180.
- - Publius Cosconius Publi filius / Galeria Arsensis / miles legionis X Geminae centuria Etrili annorum XXXI aerorum XI / hic situs (...). Zamora, Spain. AE 1928, 179.
- - Marcus Cornelius Marci filius Aniensi Foro Iulii miles legionis X Geminae centuriae Terebrae annorum XXII aerorum (...). Zamora, Spain. Hisp. Epi. 15846.
- - Rufus miles legionis X Geminae fecit. Zamora, Spain. AE 1997, 867.
- - Marcus Volumnius Cai filius Aniensi / Cremona miles legionis X hic situs est. Zamora, Spain. CIL II 2631.
- - Dis Manibus Tito Cassio Flavino centurioni legionis X Geminae Chrysampelus patrono optimo pecunia sua fecit. Tarragona (Tarraco), Spain. CIL II 4152.
- - Severus Marci filius (...) miles legionis X Geminae centuriae (...). Burgos, Spain. Hisp. epi. 16472.

== See also ==
- List of Roman legions
- Roman legion
- Asturica Augusta
