= Vicesima hereditatium =

Roman 5% tax on inheritance money

The Vicesima hereditatum was a Roman 5% tax on inheritance money.

== History ==
No inheritance tax was recorded for the Roman Republic, despite abundant evidence for testamentary law. The vicesima hereditatium ("twentieth of inheritance", also often referred to by its full name vicesima hereditatium et legatorum, "the 5% tax on inheritances and legacies") was levied by Rome's first emperor, Augustus, in the last decade of his reign. The 5% tax applied only to inheritances received through a will, and close relatives were exempt from paying it, including the deceased's grandparents, parents, children, grandchildren, and siblings. The question of whether a spouse was exempt was complicated—from the late Republic on, husbands and wives kept their own property scrupulously separate, since a Roman woman remained part of her birth family and not under the legal control of her husband. Roman social values on marital devotion probably exempted a spouse. Estates below a certain value were also exempt from the tax, according to one source, but other evidence indicates that this was only the case in the early years of Trajan's reign.
