= John Spaul =

British ancient historian and epigrapher

John Edward Houghton Spaul
- Born: 1926; Oakham
- Died: 2018 (aged 91–92); Longparish
- Other name: J. E. H. Spaul (when writing)
- Education: Durham University
- Known for: Roman historian and author
- Spouse: Marion Spaul (m. 1960)

John Edward Houghton Spaul (1926–2018), sometimes known professionally as J. E. H. Spaul, was a British ancient historian and epigrapher. Much of his work focused on the Army of the Roman Empire, though he was also interested in the local history of Andover, Hampshire.

== Education ==
Spaul was born in Oakham in Rutland. He studied at Durham University, where he edited Palatinate during Michaelmas term of 1948; and stayed on to complete a Diploma of Education (1951). By 1954, he was teaching at Giggleswick School. After some six years of study concurrent to his teaching career, he earned his MLitt (1958) from Durham. His thesis, supervised by Eric Birley, was on the Roman province of Mauretania Tingitana.

== Career ==
During three years in the 1960s Spaul lived in Blantyre, Malawi, where he was a history teacher at the University of Malawi, before returning to the United Kingdom and settling in Longparish, near Andover, Hampshire.

== Publications ==
=== Books ===
- Spaul, John (1994). Ala^{2}: The Auxiliary Cavalry Units of the Pre-Diocletian Imperial Roman Army. Nectoreca Press. OCLC 492878184.
- ——— (2000). Cohors^{2}: The Evidence for and a Short History of the Auxiliary Infantry Units of the Imperial Roman Army. Archaeopress. OCLC 45008692.
- ——— (2002). Classes Imperii Romani: An Epigraphic Examination of the Men of the Imperial Roman Navy. Nectoreca. OCLC 51803152.

=== Journal articles ===
- Swinbank, Brenda; Spaul, John Edward Houghton (1951). "The Spacing of the Forts on Hadrian's Wall". Archaeologia Aeliana. 4th series. 29: 221–238.
- Spaul, J. E. H. (1992). "In Mavretania Tingitana, Svb Volusio Martiale?". Zeitschrift für Papyrologie und Epigraphik. 94: 279–280. JSTOR 20188812.
- ——— (1992). "T.Fl.Neon: A First Century Prefect?". Zeitschrift für Papyrologie und Epigraphik. 94: 281–282. JSTOR 20188813.
- ——— (1993). "A Note on IAM 809 = CIL XVI 182". Zeitschrift für Papyrologie und Epigraphik. 96: 109–110. JSTOR 20188884.
- ——— (1994). "I.A.M. 2,250 = AE 1967,655 and the Identification of Colonia Babba". Zeitschrift für Papyrologie und Epigraphik. 103: 191–201. JSTOR 20189191.
- ——— (1994). "Governors of Tingitana" (PDF). Antiquités africaines. 30 (1): 235–260.
- ——— (1995). "Ala I Pannoniorvm: One or Many?". Zeitschrift für Papyrologie und Epigraphik. 105: 63–73. JSTOR 20189258.

== Family life ==
In July 1960 he married Marion Spaul (née Nelder), who died in January 2021.
