= Mikulovská wine =

Wine region in Moravia, Czech Republic

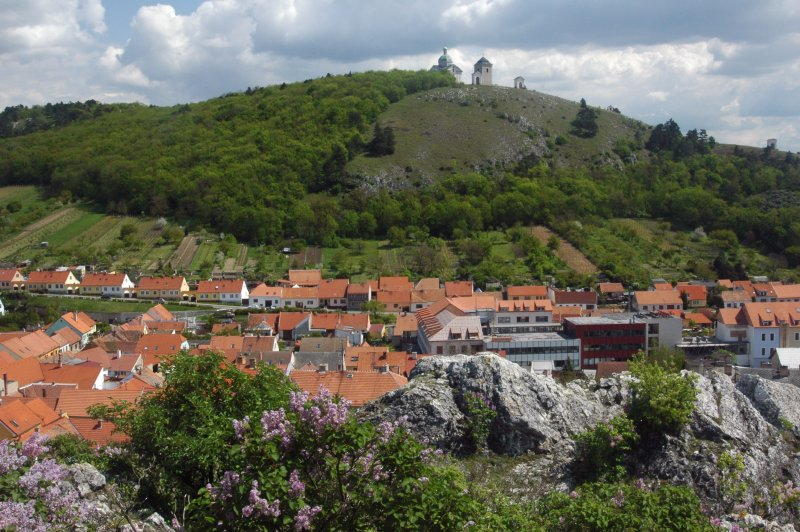
Landscape around the city of Mikulov in the Mikulovská wine region.

Mikulovská is one of four Czech wine regions within southern Moravia, Czech Republic. The Mikulovská wine region, containing 30 wine villages, is famed for producing white wines grown in the limestone soils, particularly in and around the area of the Pálava Landscape Protected Area. Historically a centre of viticulture and winemaking in Moravia, Mikulovská is home to the historical town of Mikulov, and the Czech National Wine Centre (Czech: Národní Vinařské Centrum) and Wine Salon of the Czech Republic, located at Valtice Castle.

== History ==
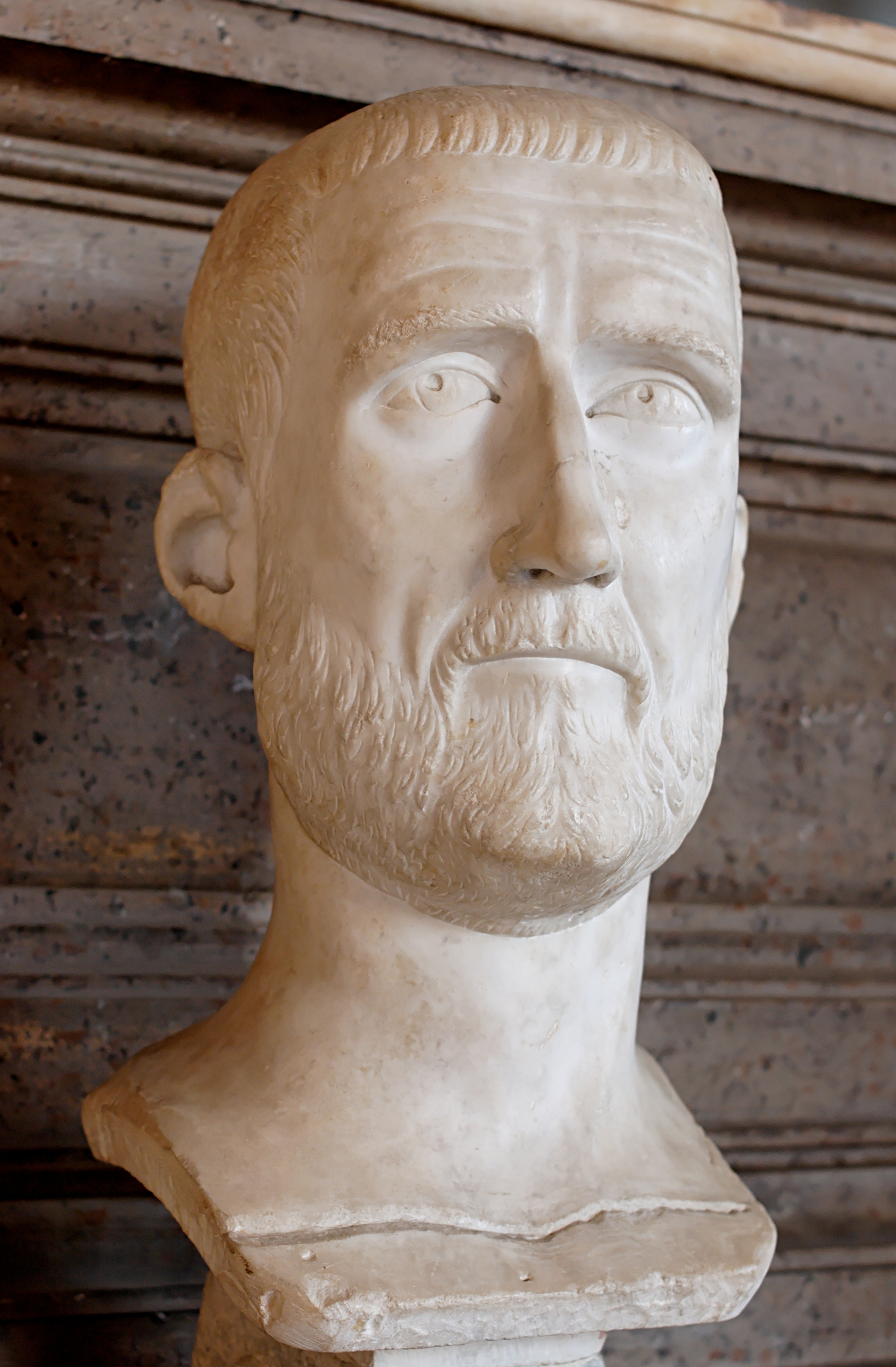
After Emperor Probus annulled the Domitian edict, he encouraged plantings of grapevines in the northern Roman colonies.

In the 2nd Century CE, the Roman 10th Legion based at Vindobona built an extensive outpost near the Amber Road and the Pálava Hills in Mikulovská, near the present-day village of Pasohlávky. Around the year 278, the Roman Emperor Marcus Aurelius Probus annulled the edict of Emperor Domitian that had prohibited the planting of grapes in colonies north of the Alps, and encouraged the planting of new vines in the northern Roman colonies. Modern-day archaeological excavations of the ancient Roman outpost near Pasohlávky have yielded many artifacts, including a vine pruning knife. Wine historians theorize that, during the Roman occupation, the Grüner Veltliner and Welschriesling grape varieties may have been introduced to the region. Viticulture was practiced during the Great Moravian Empire (833–906), as evidenced by numerous pruning knives and grape seeds unearthed during archaeological excavations of Slavic settlements.

In 1249, Ottokar II of Bohemia granted the land of Mikulov (then called Nikolsburg) and the surrounding area to the Austrian noble Henry I of Liechtenstein. Afterward, more vineyards were planted in the Pálava Hills. In 1309, a new set of viticultural and winemaking regulations was established for many southern Moravian villages, based on the application of Bergrecht laws and vineyard rules of Falkenstein, Lower Austria in the district of Mikulov. For those villages under the jurisdiction of the Falkenstein Bergrecht, Falkenstein served as the Supreme Appeals Court in vineyard disputes. By 1368, Mikulov was one of the largest wine centres in Moravia. In 1414, a large number of the vineyards around Mikulov and Valtice were documented in the Liechtenstein Duties Register, later to become the oldest preserved register of the Liechtenstein vineyards.

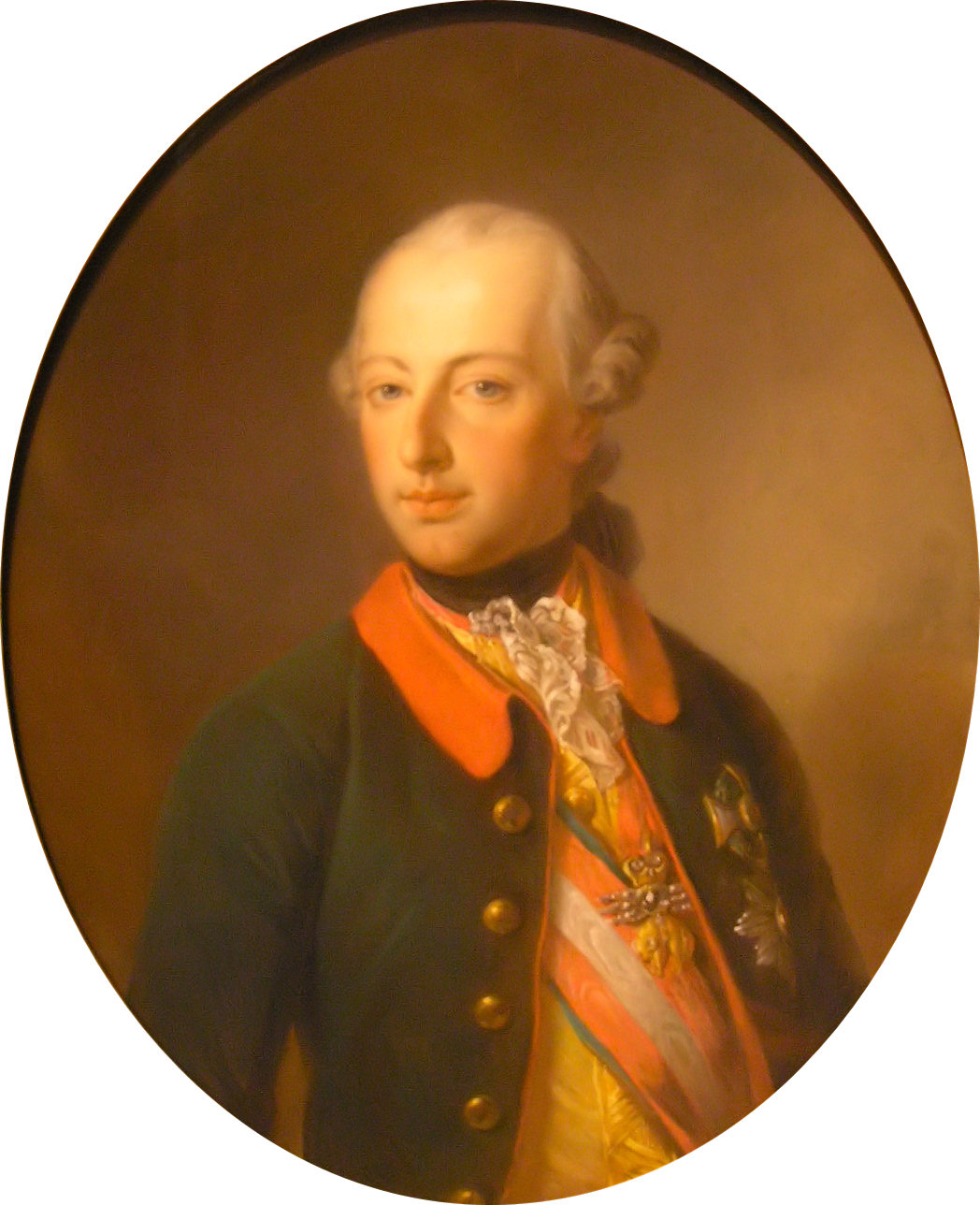
In the 18th century the Holy Roman Emperor Joseph II abolished local Bergrecht laws and established new regulations for the Moravia wine region. Portrait by Georg Decker

In the 16th century, vineyard planting reached a peak. After the Mikulov estate was purchased in 1575 by Adam von Dietrichstein, the Emperor's ambassador to the Spanish court, new vineyard plantings greatly expanded and new cellars were constructed at the Mikulov château. In 1643, the Renaissance wine barrel was commissioned by Prince Maximilian von Dietrichstein, grandson of Adam von Dietrichstein and the owner of the Mikulov estate. This enormous 1,014 hectolitre barrel was used to store wine collected as taxes from the peasants who rented the Prince's vineyards, and is one of the largest such barrels in Europe still in existence. The Thirty Years' War (1618–1648) destroyed a significant portion of the vineyards in the Czech Republic, and over the next hundred years they were gradually replanted. In 1763, Austrian vintners asked Maria Theresa to limit new vineyard plantings in Moravia to reduce the competition from Moravian wines. In 1783, the local Bergrecht laws and the activities of the wine regulation court in Moravia were abolished by Emperor Joseph II and replaced with a new set of vineyard regulations for Moravia.

Wine academies, dedicated to training capable enologists in the art and science of winemaking, were founded in the Mikulovská wine villages of Valtice in 1873, Lednice in 1895, and Mikulov in 1903. The vine pest Phylloxera arrived in Mikulov and Dolní Dunajovice in 1900, struck Perná in 1901, and hit Horní Věstonice and Bavory in 1902, devastating the vineyards. Using Phylloxera-resistant rootstock, the vineyards were replanted with quality vines of single varietals.

The establishment of modern wine laws in the Czech Republic began in 1995 with the enactment of Wine Act No. 115/1995 on viticulture and winemaking practices into the Collection of Laws (Sb). The wine section of the European Union regulations was translated into the Czech language and subsequently incorporated into the Wine Act. The original draft of the Amendment to the Wine Act also contained provisions for establishing the Czech Wine Fund through Act No. 50/2002 Sb. After the Czech Republic joined the European Union in 2004, the Wine Act No. 321/2004 Sb on viticulture and winemaking practices was adopted, bringing Czech wine legislation in conformity with EU standards.

== Geography and climate ==
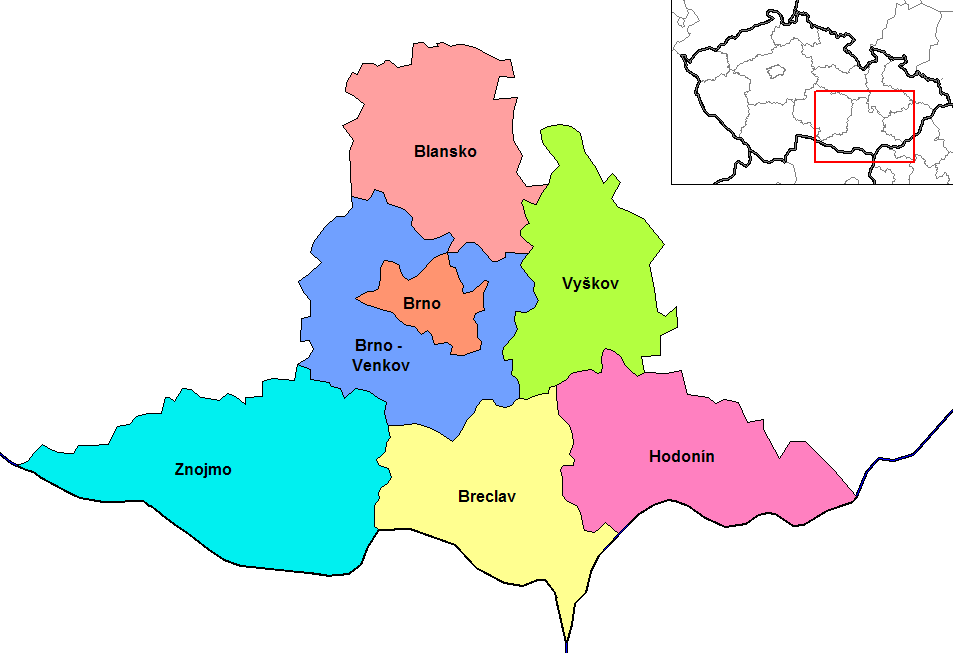
Map showing the geopolitical districts of southern Moravia including Breclav (yellow) and Brno-venkov (darker blue) that encapsulate the Mikulovská wine region.

Mikulovská is located within the Breclav and Brno-venkov geopolitical districts of the South Moravian Region. Here the tail of the Western Carpathian Mountains extends through Mikulovská and forms the Mikulov Highlands which are composed of the Pálava Hills and the Milovická Hills. The Pálava Hills are formed of Jurassic limestone that can be seen as steep cliffs in some areas. Devín Hill is the highest peak at 549 metres (1,801 ft). The rolling Milovická Hills, located east of Mikulov, are composed of Mesozoic limestone and Cenozoic deposits of flysch argillites and sandstones. Calcareous loess from the last ice age has been preserved in many places. The system of hills forms a unique UNESCO biosphere reservation, home to several rare protected plant and animal species. Surrounding the Mikulov Highlands and to the northwest are Cenozoic deposits of calcareous clays, sands, and gravel.

Situated at the northwest edge of the Pannonian Plain, the Mikulovská region is in the warmest and nearly the driest part of the Czech Republic. The Thaya (Czech: Dyje) River runs through the region from west to east, with a series of three dams forming the three Nové Mlýny reservoirs. Covering a combined 3,227 hectares, the reservoirs exert a moderating influence on the macroclimate.

== Grape varieties and wine styles ==
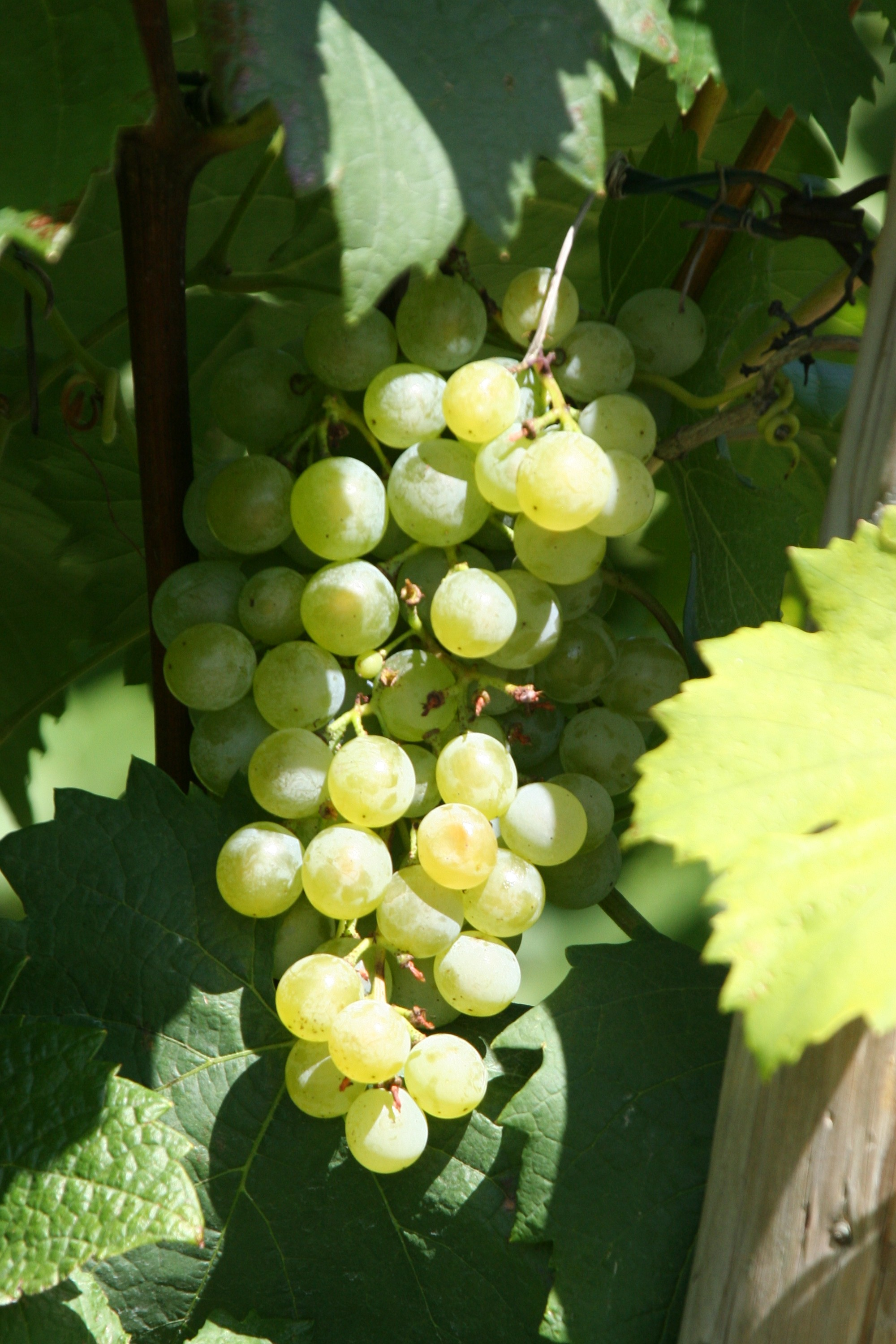
Grüner Veltliner

More white grape (3,225 ha) than red grape varieties (1,210 ha) are grown in Mikulovská. Of the white varieties, Welschriesling (Czech: Ryzlink vlašský, 601 ha) and Grüner Veltliner (Veltlínské zelené, 393 ha), both of which are traditional to the region, predominate. Riesling (Ryzlink rýnský, 335 ha), Müller Thurgau (331 ha), Sauvignon blanc (301 ha), Chardonnay (268 ha), and Pinot gris (Rulandské šedé, 218 ha) are also grown. More Gewürztraminer (Tramín červený, 164 ha) is grown in Mikulovská than any other Moravian region.

The most planted red varieties are Saint Laurent (Svatovavrinecké, 310 ha), Blaufränkisch (Frankovka, 248 ha), Zweigelt (Zweigeltrebe, 181 ha), and Pinot noir (Rulandské modré, 172 ha). Plantings of Blauer Portugieser (Modrý Portugal, 92 ha) has decreased rapidly, while Cabernet Sauvignon (89 ha) has increased.

== Wine classification ==
The Czech Wine Classification System, set in the Viticulture Act of 2004, is based on the sugar content of the grapes at harvest. Sugar content is measured using the Normalizovaný moštomer (°NM) scale, a measure of how many kilograms of sugar are in 100 litres of must. 1 °NM indicates 1 kg of sugar in 100 L of must.

== Wine municipalities and vineyards ==
Thirty wine municipalities, along with 182 registered cadastral vineyard tracts, are situated within Mikulovská and are defined under the Czech Viticulture Act. By law, single-vineyard wines must have the name of the vineyard (Czech: trať), as well as the wine municipality (vinařská obec) and viticultural area (vinařská podoblast), on the bottle label.

Wine municipality	District	Vineyards
Bavory	Břeclav	Pod Pálavou, Slunečná, Růžová, Maliny, Anenský vrch, U Rybníčka, Pod Státní
Březí	Břeclav	Ořechová hora, Lišcí vrch
Brod nad Dyjí	Břeclav	Lusy, Dunajovický kopec, Brodské stráně
Bulhary	Břeclav	Nad Sklepy, Doubrava, Na Pískách, Panské, Podlesí
Dobré Pole	Břeclav	Brodsko, Rosentické, Staré, Daniel
Dolní Dunajovice	Břeclav	Ořechová hora, Pod Slunným vrchem, Růžový kopec, Dunajovský kopec, Kraví hora, Mlýnská, Zimní vrch, Plotny, Pod Ořechovkou
Dolní Věstonice	Břeclav	Za Humny, U Kapličky, Pod Pálavou, U Třech panen
Drnholec	Břeclav	U Křížku, Výsluní, Šibenicní vrch, Sluneční vrch, Hajdy na jamách, Šternberg
Hlohovec	Břeclav	Stará hora, Delice, Šulaperk
Horní Věstonice	Břeclav	Pod Martinkou, Pod Děvínem, U Venuše
Ivaň	Brno-Country	Aeibis
Jevišovka	Břeclav	Stará hora, Dražice, Rebry
Klentnice	Břeclav	Bavorsko, Stará hora, Pod Klentnicí, Pod Lomem, Nad Sv. Leonardem
Lednice	Břeclav	Končiny, Terasy, U Červené studánky, Hlohovsko, Ve Starých, Na Valtické, Farské
Mikulov	Břeclav	Pod Svatým kopečkem I, Pod Svatým kopečkem II, Valtická, Pod Valtickou, Milovická, Za Cihelnou, Mariánský kopec, Šibeniční vrch, Pod Mušlovem, Turold, Brněnská, Za Turoldem
Milovice	Břeclav	Nad Rybníkem, Špičák, U Cihelny, Pod Strážným vrchem, Strážný vrch, Milovické terasy, Nad Sklepy
Novosedly	Břeclav	U Božích muk, Stará hora, Růžová hora, Nad Sklepy, Slunečná, Janův vrch, Kamenný vrch
Nový Přerov	Břeclav	Na Štrekách, Langewarte
Pasohlávky	Brno-Country	Římský vrch, Ovčárna, U Akátového lesa
Pavlov	Břeclav	Pod Pannama, Nad Jezerem, Pod Pálavou, Slunný vrch, U Božích muk, Nová hora, Stará hora, Na Výsluní, Sahara
Perná	Břeclav	Věstonsko, U Spálené hospody, Purmice, Goldhammer, Železná, Kotelná, Levá klentnická, Pravá klentnická, Nad Sokolovnou, U Mikuláška, Bergrus, U Boží muky, Na Statkách, Levá bavorská, Pravá bavorská, U Kapličky, Zahrady
Pohořelice	Brno-Country	Karlovy kopce, Staré vinohrady, Vlasaticko, Drnholecko, Vinohrádky, Kamínka
Popice	Břeclav	Ráfle, Mitrberk, Stará hora, Svidrunk, Panenský kopec, Unédy, Sonberk, Písky
Pouzdřany	Břeclav	Kolby, Stará hora, Grunty
Přibice	Brno-Country	Vinohrady, Přední, Podsedly, Čtvrtky
Sedlec	Břeclav	U Třešňové aleje, Stolová hora, Zátiší-Hliník, Kotel, Nad Nesytem, Štambery, Sedlecko, U Ovčárny
Strachotín	Břeclav	Nad Sklepy, Šusfeldy, U Hřiště, Kolimberk, Kraví hora
Valtice	Břeclav	Kamenné hory, Hůrka, Pod Sluneční horou, Soneberg, Nad Mlýnem, Pánský kopec, Za Humny, Staré hory, U Cihelny, Jižní svahy, Nad Peklem, Terasy u Křížového sklepu, Pod Raisnou, Knížecí vyhlídka, Hintertály, Jižní svahy, Terasy u hranic, Sacny, Kačisdorfské pole, Horní čtvrtě, Culisty-Dlúhé, U Hájku
Vlasatice	Brno-Country	Novoveské vinohrady, Branišovské vinohrady, Pohořelické vinohrady
Vranovice	Brno-Country	Vinohrádky, Podsedky, Žlebské, Kopečky
