= Novosedly (Břeclav District) =

- Municipality
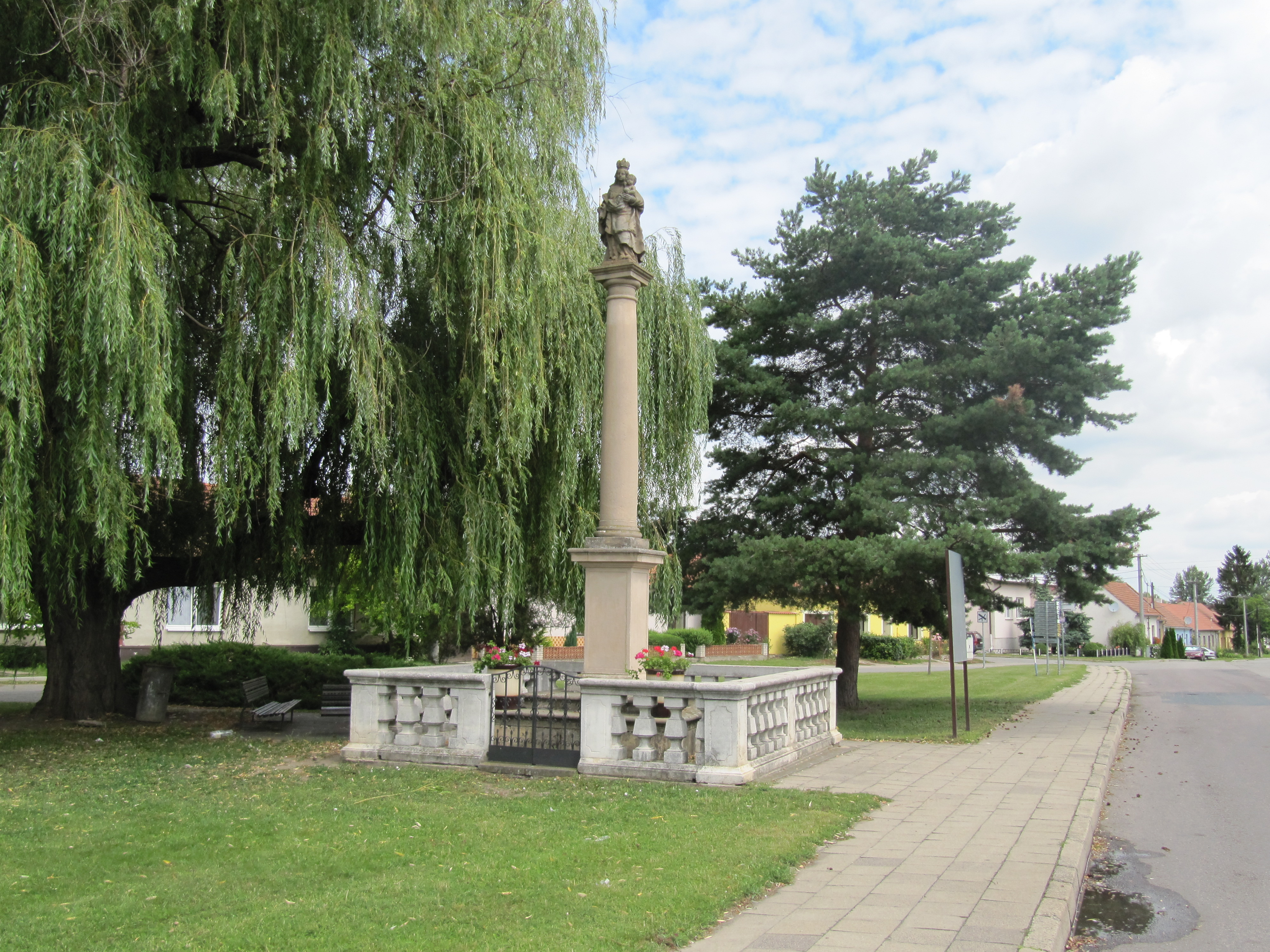
- Centre of Novosedly

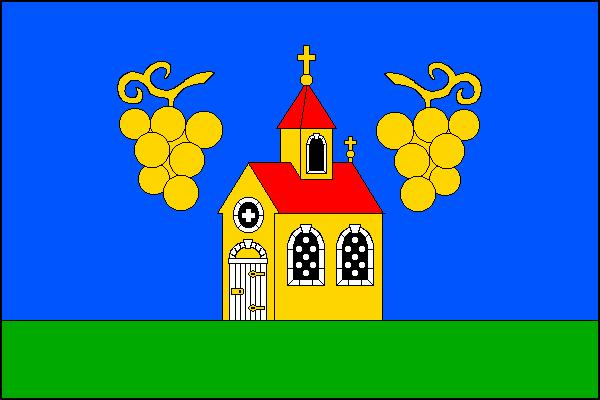
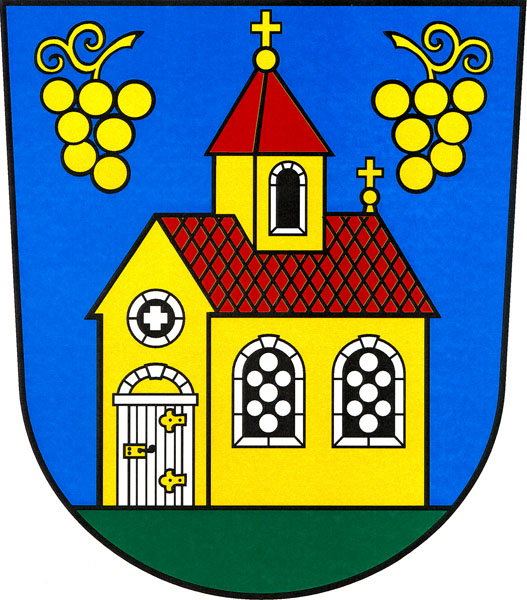
- Flag Coat of arms

- Location in the Czech Republic
- Coordinates: 48°50′13″N 16°29′34″E
- Country: Czech Republic
- Region: South Moravian
- District: Břeclav
- First mentioned: 1276

Area
  - Total: 16.74 km^{2} (6.46 sq mi)
- Elevation: 173 m (568 ft)

Population (2026-01-01)
  - Total: 1,357
  - Density: 81.06/km^{2} (210.0/sq mi)
- Time zone: UTC+1 (CET)
  - Summer (DST): UTC+2 (CEST)
- Postal code: 691 82
- Website: www.novosedly.eu

Novosedly (German: Neusiedl) is a municipality and village in Břeclav District in the South Moravian Region of the Czech Republic. It has about 1,400 inhabitants.

== Geography ==
Novosedly is located about 30 kilometres (19 mi) northwest of Břeclav and 39 km (24 mi) south of Brno. It lies in the Dyje–Svratka Valley. The highest point is the Syslík hill at 265 m (869 ft) above sea level. The municipality is situated on the right bank of the Thaya River.

== History ==
The first written mention of Novosedly is from 1276, when it was acquired by the convent in Dolní Kounice. The village was probably founded as a typical colonisation settlement in the first half of the 13th century. In the mid-14th century, the village was annexed to the Drnholec estate and shared its owners and fates. This state lasted until the establishment of an independent municipality in 1848.

After World War I and the Treaty of Saint-Germain-en-Laye, the municipality became part of Czechoslovakia and got its Czech name. Following the Munich Agreement German troops marched into Novosedly in October 1938. From that time onward the municipality belonged to the Reichsgau Niederdonau until 1945. After World War II, the municipality fell back to Czechoslovakia. The German-spekaing population was expelled and their properties were confiscated.

== Demographics ==
Historical population

Year	Pop.	±%
1869	1,183	—
1880	1,288	+8.9%
1890	1,364	+5.9%
1900	1,343	−1.5%
1910	1,348	+0.4%

Year	Pop.	±%
1921	1,427	+5.9%
1930	1,472	+3.2%
1950	1,062	−27.9%
1961	1,152	+8.5%
1970	1,085	−5.8%

Year	Pop.	±%
1980	1,204	+11.0%
1991	1,188	−1.3%
2001	1,145	−3.6%
2011	1,112	−2.9%
2021	1,249	+12.3%

Source: Censuses

== Economy ==
Novosedly is known for viticulture and winemaking. The municipality lies in the Mikulovská wine subregion.

== Transport ==
Novosedly is located on the railway line from Břeclav to Znojmo.

== Sights ==
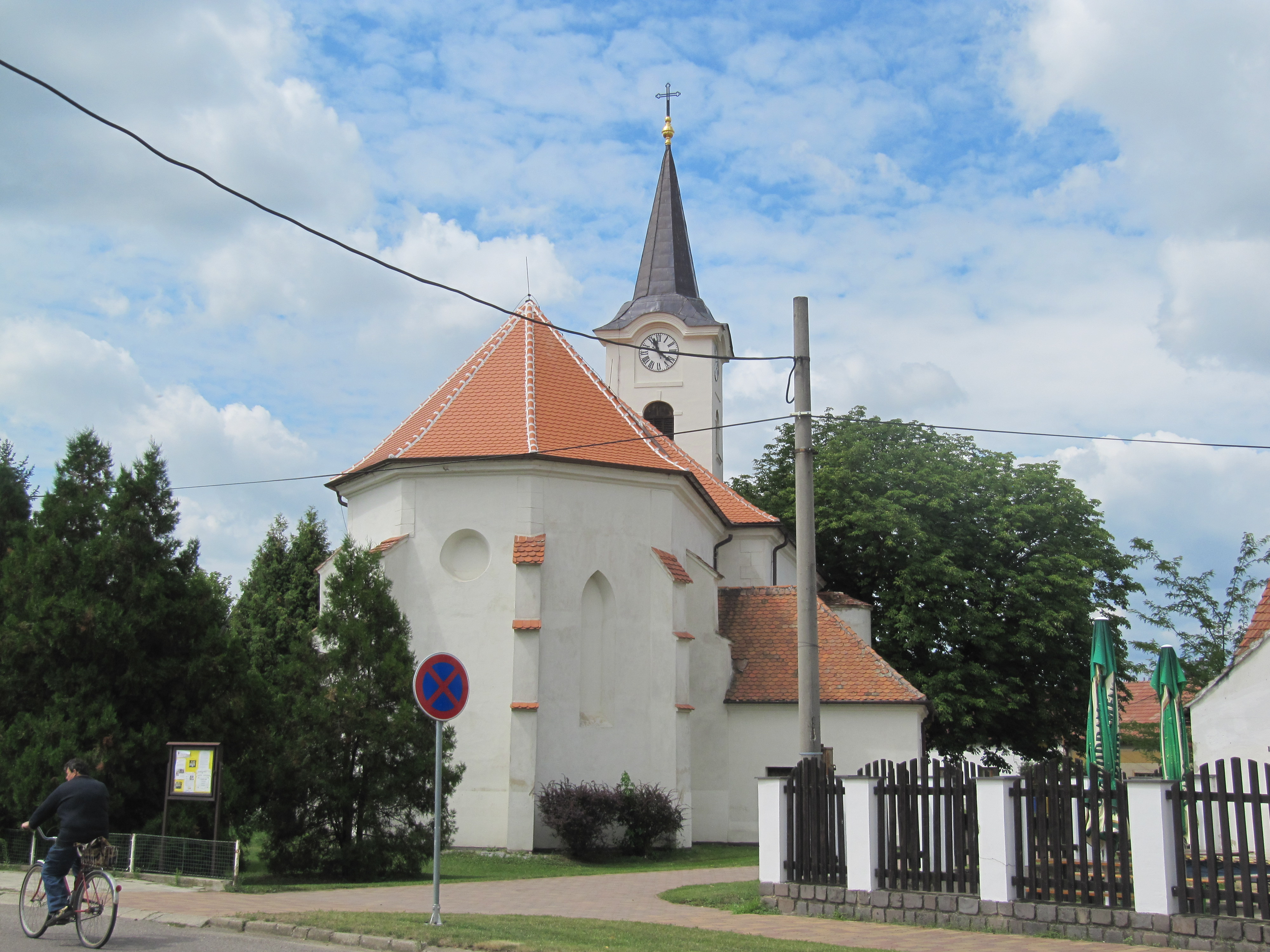
Church of Saint Ulrich

The main landmark of Novosedly is the Church of Saint Ulrich. It is one of the few original Romanesque church buildings in the region. The original Romanesque phase was covered by Gothic and other modifications, but the Romanesque windows in the attic, found during the restoration of the church in 1946, were preserved.
