= Brod nad Dyjí =

- Municipality
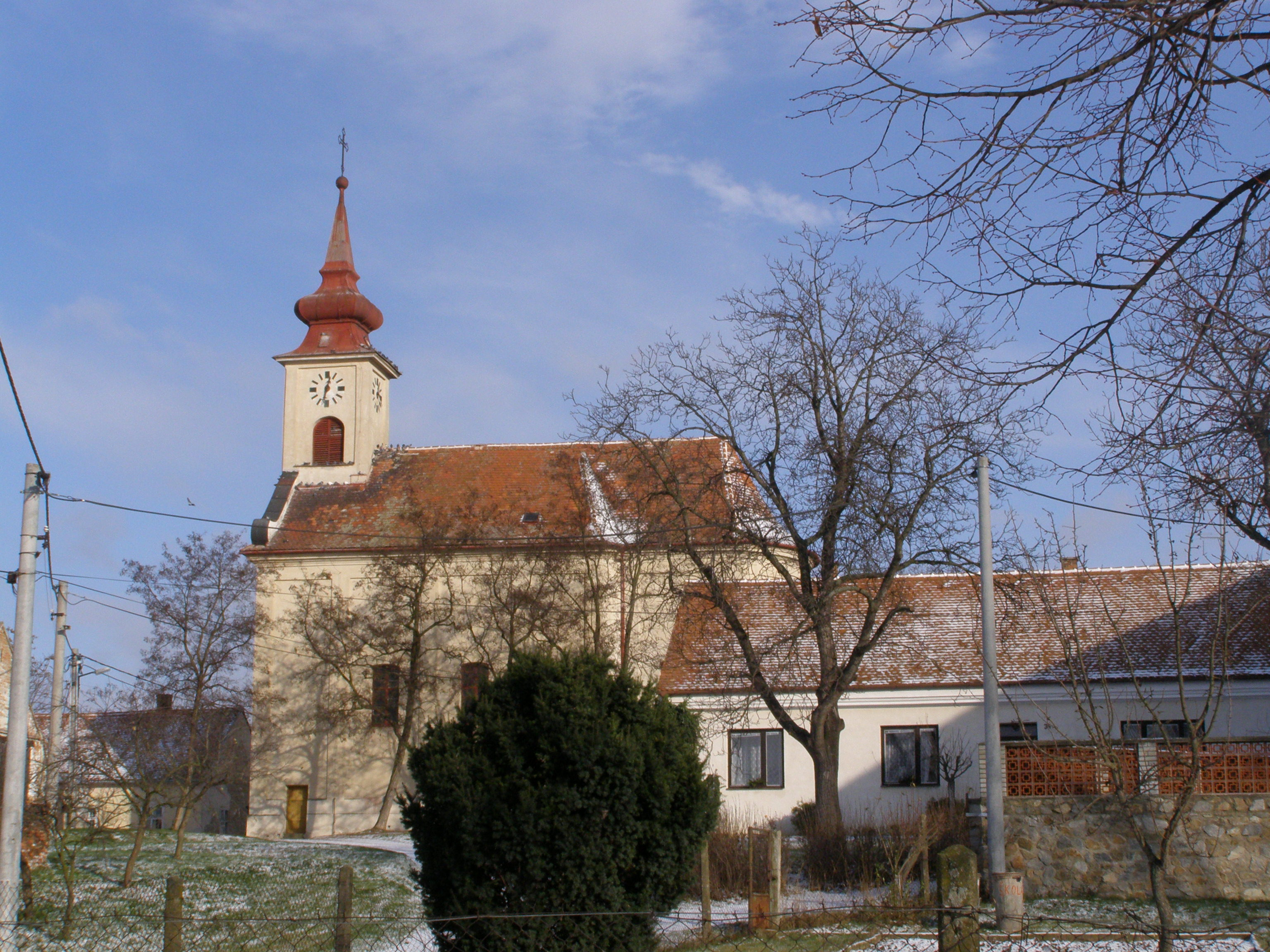
- Church of Saint John of Nepomuk

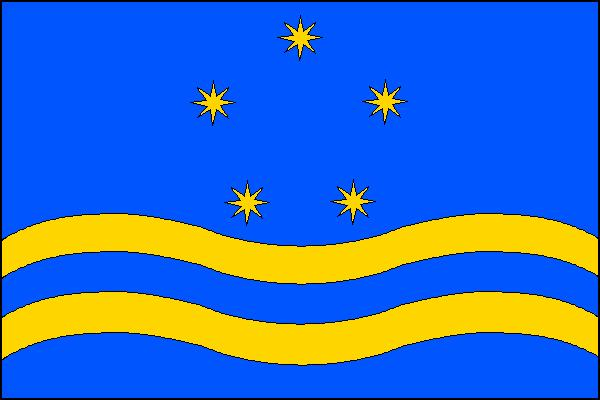
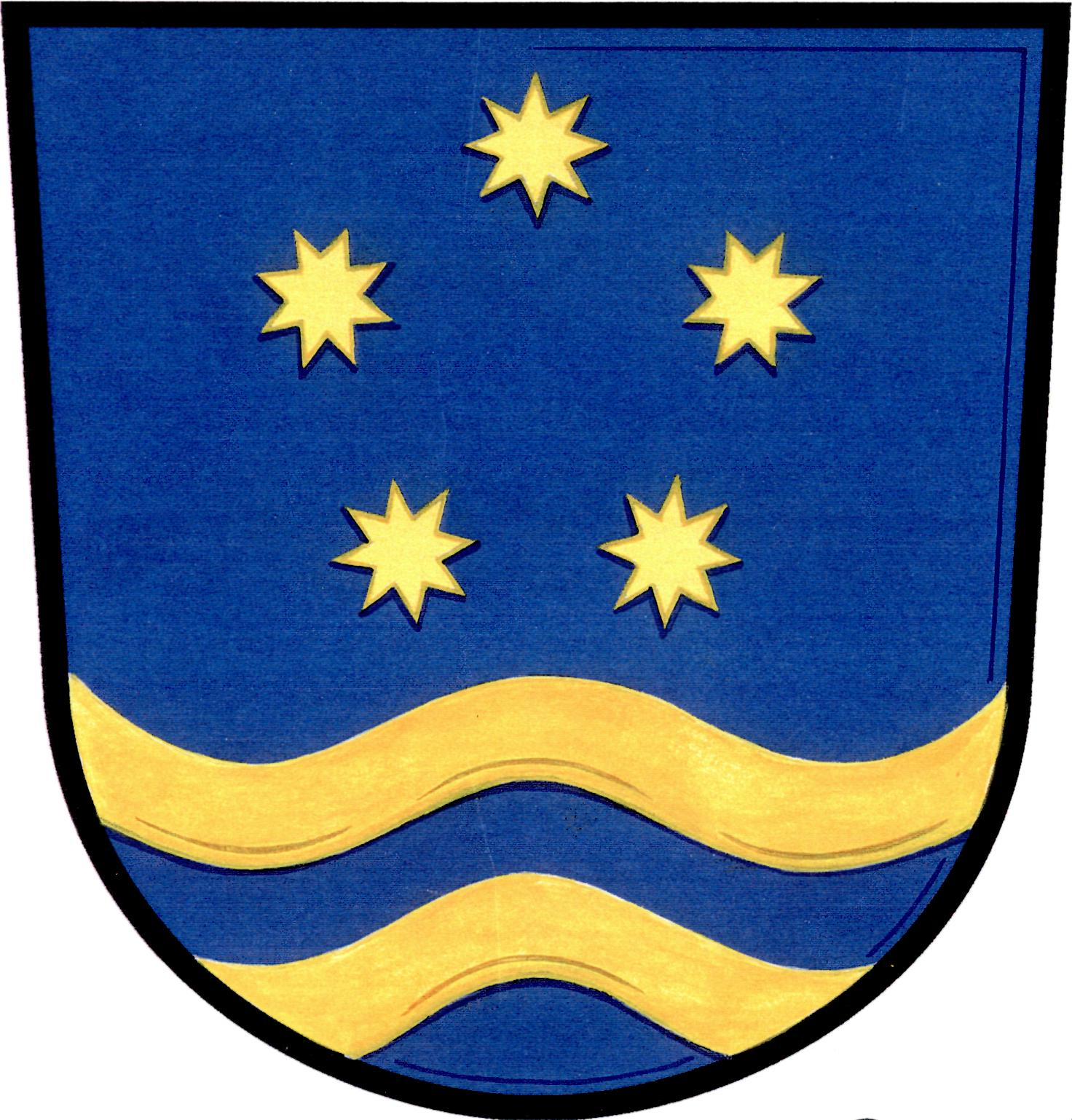
- Flag Coat of arms

- Location in the Czech Republic
- Coordinates: 48°52′31″N 16°32′7″E
- Country: Czech Republic
- Region: South Moravian
- District: Břeclav
- First mentioned: 1353

Area
  - Total: 11.18 km^{2} (4.32 sq mi)
- Elevation: 175 m (574 ft)

Population (2026-01-01)
  - Total: 555
  - Density: 49.6/km^{2} (129/sq mi)
- Time zone: UTC+1 (CET)
  - Summer (DST): UTC+2 (CEST)
- Postal code: 691 81
- Website: www.brodnaddyji.cz

Brod nad Dyjí (until 1947 Kolenfurt; German: Guldenfurt) is a municipality and village in Břeclav District in the South Moravian Region of the Czech Republic. It has about 600 inhabitants.

== Geography ==
Brod nad Dyjí is located about 29 kilometres (18 mi) northwest of Břeclav and 34 km (21 mi) south of Brno. It lies in the Dyje–Svratka Valley. The village is situated on the shores on the Nové Mlýny reservoirs.

=== Climate ===
Brod nad Dyjí's climate is classified as humid continental climate (Köppen: Dfb; Trewartha: Dcbo). Among them, the annual average temperature is 10.1 °C (50.2 °F), the hottest month in July is 20.6 °C (69.1 °F), and the coldest month is −0.5 °C (31.1 °F) in January. The annual precipitation is 488.7 millimetres (19.24 in), of which July is the wettest with 67.6 millimetres (2.66 in), while February is the driest with only 19.3 millimetres (0.76 in). The extreme temperature throughout the year ranged from −31.0 °C (−23.8 °F) on 7 January 1985 to 39.7 °C (103.5 °F) on 8 August 2013.

Climate data for Brod nad Dyjí, 1991–2020 normals, extremes 1982–present
Month	Jan	Feb	Mar	Apr	May	Jun	Jul	Aug	Sep	Oct	Nov	Dec	Year
Record high °C (°F)	17.9 (64.2)	18.3 (64.9)	24.4 (75.9)	30.3 (86.5)	33.6 (92.5)	37.7 (99.9)	37.6 (99.7)	39.7 (103.5)	33.5 (92.3)	29.0 (84.2)	20.5 (68.9)	15.8 (60.4)	39.7 (103.5)
Mean daily maximum °C (°F)	2.5 (36.5)	5.2 (41.4)	10.3 (50.5)	16.8 (62.2)	21.2 (70.2)	25.1 (77.2)	27.4 (81.3)	27.1 (80.8)	21.2 (70.2)	14.7 (58.5)	8.3 (46.9)	3.2 (37.8)	15.2 (59.4)
Daily mean °C (°F)	−0.5 (31.1)	1.0 (33.8)	5.0 (41.0)	10.7 (51.3)	15.3 (59.5)	18.9 (66.0)	20.6 (69.1)	20.3 (68.5)	15.1 (59.2)	9.7 (49.5)	5.1 (41.2)	0.6 (33.1)	10.1 (50.2)
Mean daily minimum °C (°F)	−3.8 (25.2)	−3.1 (26.4)	0.2 (32.4)	4.1 (39.4)	8.9 (48.0)	12.3 (54.1)	13.9 (57.0)	13.6 (56.5)	9.7 (49.5)	5.3 (41.5)	1.8 (35.2)	−2.5 (27.5)	5.0 (41.0)
Record low °C (°F)	−31.0 (−23.8)	−24.5 (−12.1)	−18.5 (−1.3)	−8.8 (16.2)	−3.8 (25.2)	−0.3 (31.5)	4.4 (39.9)	4.2 (39.6)	−1.0 (30.2)	−9.0 (15.8)	−15.2 (4.6)	−27.5 (−17.5)	−31.0 (−23.8)
Average precipitation mm (inches)	21.3 (0.84)	19.3 (0.76)	30.2 (1.19)	28.6 (1.13)	53.4 (2.10)	62.8 (2.47)	67.6 (2.66)	60.2 (2.37)	57.1 (2.25)	33.0 (1.30)	28.9 (1.14)	26.1 (1.03)	488.7 (19.24)
Average snowfall cm (inches)	9.4 (3.7)	6.4 (2.5)	3.1 (1.2)	0.5 (0.2)	0.0 (0.0)	0.0 (0.0)	0.0 (0.0)	0.0 (0.0)	0.0 (0.0)	trace	2.5 (1.0)	7.2 (2.8)	29.2 (11.5)
Average relative humidity (%)	83.2	78.1	72.0	64.5	67.3	68.4	67.4	68.4	75.2	80.9	84.4	85.5	74.6
Mean monthly sunshine hours	50.0	84.7	151.6	222.9	220.7	240.9	260.6	256.3	185.7	111.4	59.9	45.1	1,889.8
Source: Czech Hydrometeorological Institute

== History ==
The village was founded during the German colonisation in the 13th century. The first written mention of Brod nad Dyjí is from 1355, when it was called Guldenfurt/Kolenfurt. From that year until the establishment of an independent municipality in 1848, it belonged to the Drnholec estate.

From 1938 to 1945, the municipality was annexed by Nazi Germany and administered as part of the Reichsgau Niederdonau. After World War II, many German-speaking inhabitants fled to Austria and the rest were expelled.

In 1947, the municipality was renamed from Kolenfurt to its current name.

== Demographics ==
Historical population

Year	Pop.	±%
1869	774	—
1880	814	+5.2%
1890	889	+9.2%
1900	1,011	+13.7%
1910	955	−5.5%

Year	Pop.	±%
1921	943	−1.3%
1930	999	+5.9%
1950	587	−41.2%
1961	612	+4.3%
1970	576	−5.9%

Year	Pop.	±%
1980	533	−7.5%
1991	459	−13.9%
2001	486	+5.9%
2011	460	−5.3%
2021	541	+17.6%

Source: Censuses

== Economy ==
Brod nad Dyjí is known for viticulture. The municipality lies in the Mikulovská wine subregion.

== Transport ==
There are no railways or major roads passing through the municipality.

== Sights ==
The main landmark of Brod nad Dyjí is the Church of Saint John of Nepomuk. It was built in the Neoclassical style in 1770–1783.
