= Pouzdřany =

- Municipality
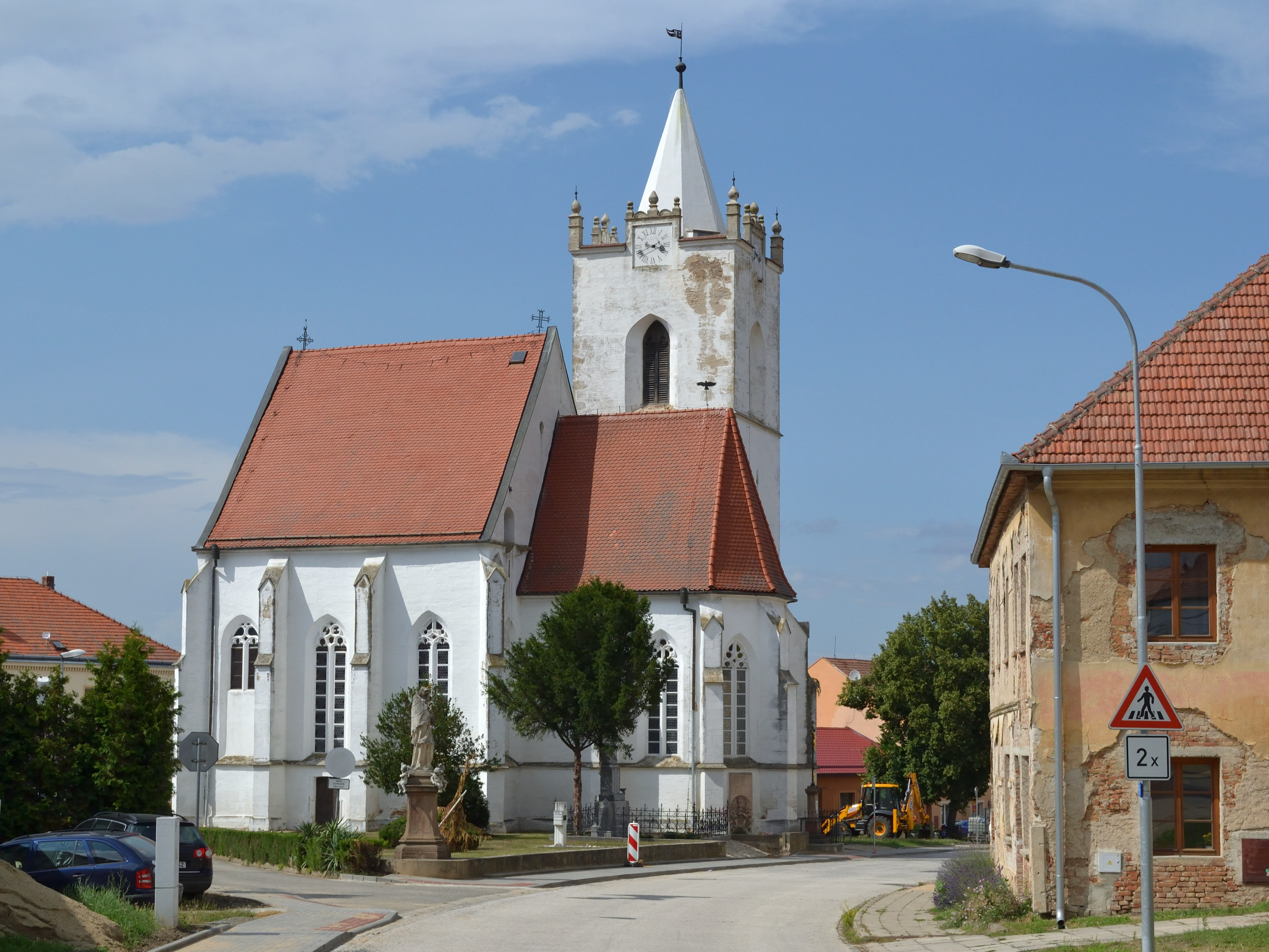
- Church of Saint Nicholas

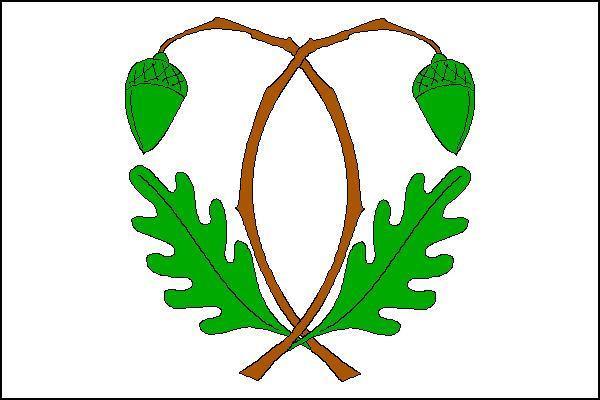
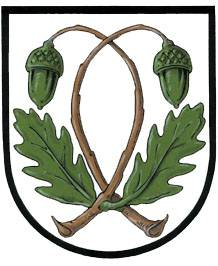
- Flag Coat of arms

- Location in the Czech Republic
- Coordinates: 48°56′4″N 16°37′30″E
- Country: Czech Republic
- Region: South Moravian
- District: Břeclav
- First mentioned: 1244

Government
  - Mayor: Renata Halámková

Area
  - Total: 13.60 km^{2} (5.25 sq mi)
- Elevation: 177 m (581 ft)

Population (2026-01-01)
  - Total: 780
  - Density: 57/km^{2} (150/sq mi)
- Time zone: UTC+1 (CET)
  - Summer (DST): UTC+2 (CEST)
- Postal code: 691 26
- Website: www.pouzdrany.cz

Pouzdřany (German: Pausram) is a municipality and village in Břeclav District in the South Moravian Region of the Czech Republic. It has about 800 inhabitants.

== Etymology ==
The name was originally a name for the village's inhabitants, Púzdřěné, derived from the personal name Púzdro (identical with the Old Czech common noun púzdro, meaning 'case'). The name thus meant "Púzdro's people". The German name Pausram developed from the Czech name through phonetic adaptation, and under its influence the form Pouzdrany was also used in Czech.

== Geography ==
Pouzdřany is located about 27 kilometres (17 mi) northwest of Břeclav and 27 km (17 mi) south of Brno. It lies on the border between the Dyje–Svratka Valley and Lower Morava Valley. The municipality is situated on the left bank of the Svratka River. Part of the Nové Mlýny Reservoir lies in the southern part of the municipal territory.

=== Nature ===
Northeast of the village lies the Pouzdřanská step – Kolby National Nature Monument with an area of 157.13 hectares (388.3 acres). It protects dry steppe grasslands, thermophilic shrubs, Pannonian oak-hornbeam forests and thermophilic oak forests. The area was first protected in 1946, became a national nature reserve in 1992 and was significantly extended and reclassified as a national nature monument in 2014. It is also part of the Natura 2000 network. Protected animals found here include the stag beetle, great capricorn beetle and European bee-eater.

== History ==
The first written mention of Pouzdřany is from 1244, when it was called Pauzrams in a deed of King Wenceslaus I. The village often changed owners. In the 13th century, it was property of Boček of Obřany, the convent in Dolní Kounice, and Jindřich of Liechtenstein. In the 14th century, the owners were the Lords of Lipá and then the nobleman Mikuláš Dítě. After that, the estate was split between two Liechtensteins.

From 1556 to 1575, Pouzdřany was owned by Ambrož of Ottersdorf, who gave it various rights, including right to plant vineyards. In 1581, during the rule of Friedrich of Zierotin, Pouzdřany was promoted to a market town by Emperor Rudolf II. In 1538 the Anabaptists settled in the town, however, they were expelled in the early 17th century. Pouzdřany suffered from the passage of troops between 1597 and 1608. It was looted and almost completely burned down during the following Austro-Turkish War in 1663.

In 1865, a school was built here. From 1928 to 1938, a school for the Czech minority existed here.

After World War I and the Treaty of Saint-Germain-en-Laye, Pouzdřany became part of the newly established Czechoslovakia. Following the Munich Agreement in 1938, the municipality was annexed by Nazi Germany and administered as part of the Reichsgau Niederdonau until 1945. After World War II, the municipality fell back to Czechoslovakia and the German-speaking population was expelled as a result of the Beneš decrees.

== Demographics ==
According to the 1930 census, Pouzdřany had 1,184 inhabitants, of whom 863 declared German nationality and 303 Czechoslovak nationality.

Historical population

| Year | Pop. | ±% |
|---|---|---|
| 1869 | 1,235 | — |
| 1880 | 1,236 | +0.1% |
| 1890 | 1,296 | +4.9% |
| 1900 | 1,218 | −6.0% |
| 1910 | 1,213 | −0.4% |

| Year | Pop. | ±% |
|---|---|---|
| 1921 | 1,143 | −5.8% |
| 1930 | 1,184 | +3.6% |
| 1950 | 1,067 | −9.9% |
| 1961 | 1,098 | +2.9% |
| 1970 | 988 | −10.0% |

| Year | Pop. | ±% |
|---|---|---|
| 1980 | 876 | −11.3% |
| 1991 | 767 | −12.4% |
| 2001 | 786 | +2.5% |
| 2011 | 736 | −6.4% |
| 2021 | 746 | +1.4% |

Source: Censuses

== Administration ==
The municipality has no administrative parts. It consists of two basic settlement units: Pouzdřany and U mlýna.

Since November 2026, the mayor has been Renata Halámková, who succeeded Miroslav Šmarda. The municipal council has nine members.

The coat of arms and flag were granted to the municipality on 27 June 2001.

== Economy ==
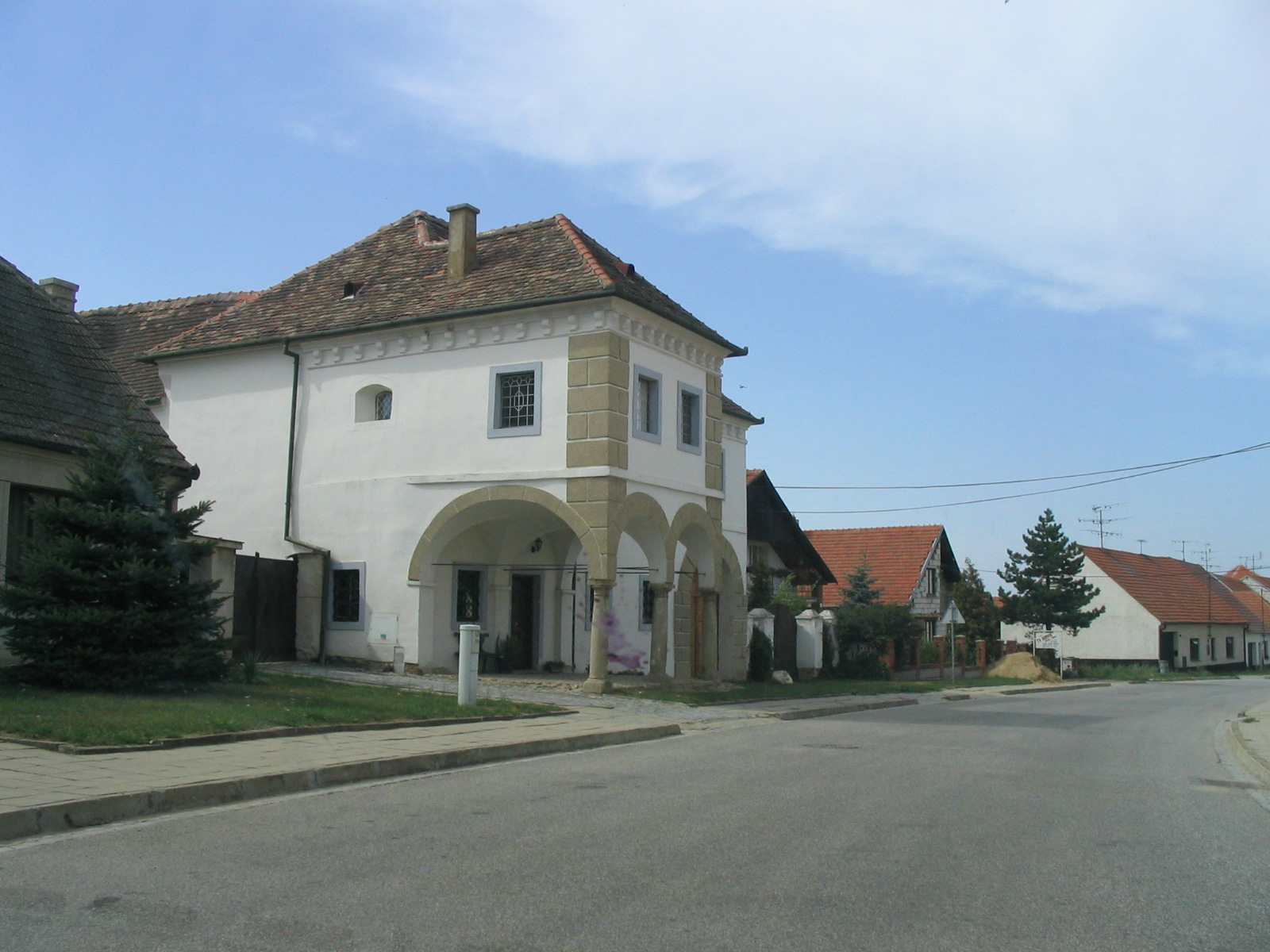
Renaissance house in Pouzdřany

Pouzdřany is known for viticulture. The municipality lies in the Mikulovská wine subregion. There are 39 hectares (96 acres) of vineyards.

== Transport ==
Pouzdřany is located on the railway line Tišnov–Hustopeče via Brno.

== Sights ==
The main landmark of Pouzdřany is the Church of Saint Nicholas. It was built in the late Gothic style around 1498, and in this form it has been preserved to this day. A massive Renaissance tower was added to it.

The burgher house No. 115 on Hlavní Street is a late Renaissance building, built before 1600. Its arcaded courtyard wing bears the date 1607, and the upper floor of the street wing rests on three Tuscan columns forming an arcade. According to the National Heritage Institute, it is one of the most valuable buildings of its kind in South Moravia. It has been protected as a cultural monument since 1958 and houses a private museum.
