= Kubšice =

Municipality and village in the Czech Republic

- Municipality
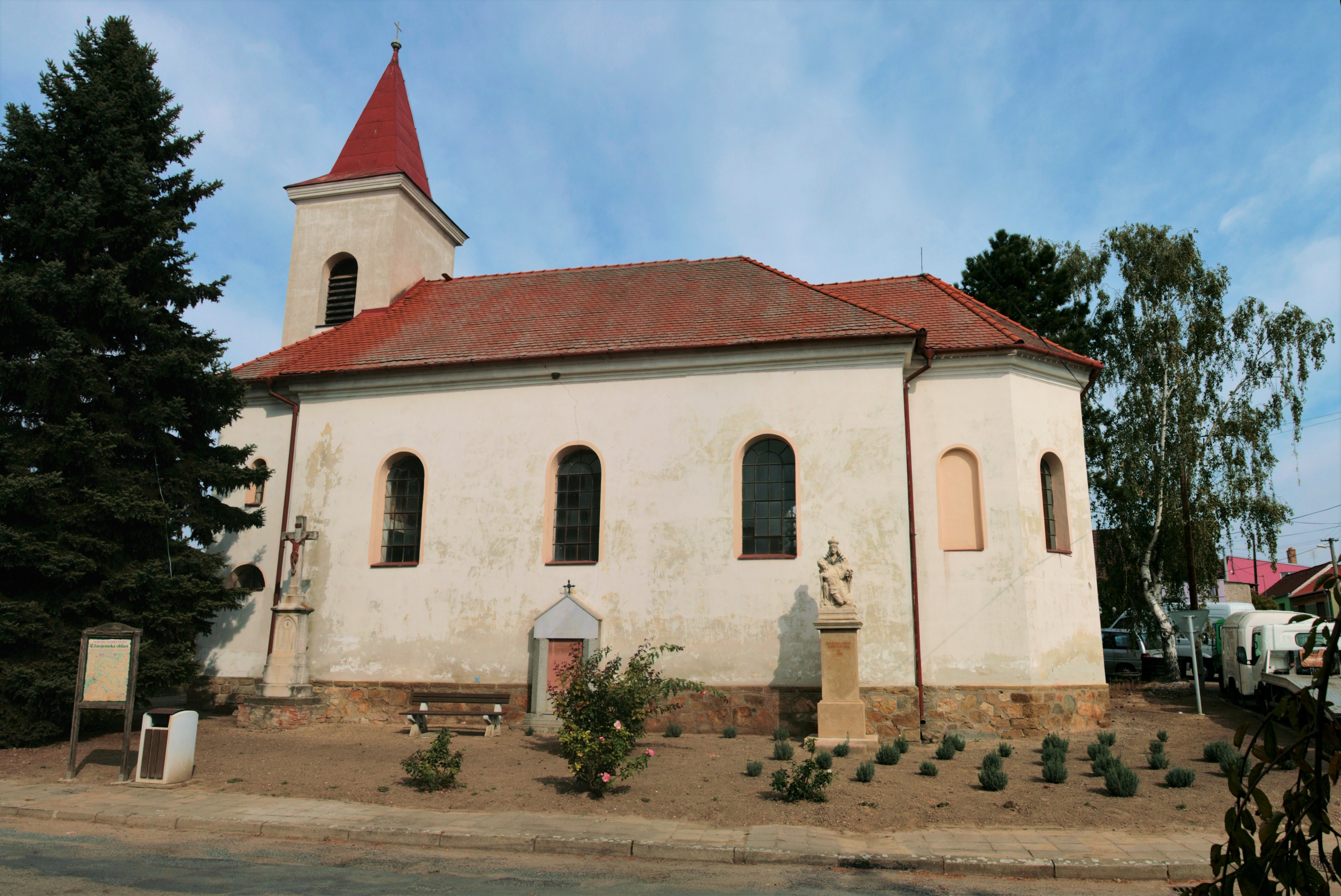
- Church of Our Lady of Sorrows

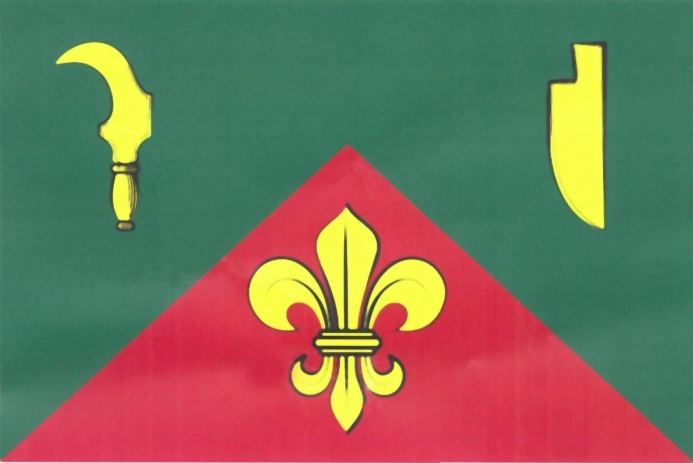
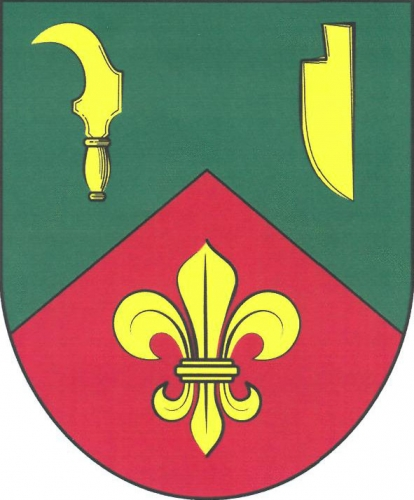
- Flag Coat of arms

- Location in the Czech Republic
- Coordinates: 49°0′3″N 16°24′47″E
- Country: Czech Republic
- Region: South Moravian
- District: Znojmo
- First mentioned: 1353

Area
  - Total: 4.01 km^{2} (1.55 sq mi)
- Elevation: 208 m (682 ft)

Population (2026-01-01)
  - Total: 195
  - Density: 48.6/km^{2} (126/sq mi)
- Time zone: UTC+1 (CET)
  - Summer (DST): UTC+2 (CEST)
- Postal code: 671 76
- Website: kubsice.eu

Kubšice is a municipality and village in Znojmo District in the South Moravian Region of the Czech Republic. It has about 200 inhabitants.

== Geography ==
Kubšice is located about 30 kilometres (19 mi) northeast of Znojmo and 26 km (16 mi) southwest of Brno. It lies in an agricultural landscape in the Dyje–Svratka Valley. The highest point is at 247 m (810 ft) above sea level. The stream Šumický potok originates here and then flows through the village.

== History ==
The first written mention of Kubšice is from 1353.

== Demographics ==
Historical population

Year	Pop.	±%
1869	312	—
1880	355	+13.8%
1890	348	−2.0%
1900	348	+0.0%
1910	356	+2.3%

Year	Pop.	±%
1921	334	−6.2%
1930	341	+2.1%
1950	259	−24.0%
1961	278	+7.3%
1970	236	−15.1%

Year	Pop.	±%
1980	199	−15.7%
1991	167	−16.1%
2001	156	−6.6%
2011	155	−0.6%
2021	176	+13.5%

Source: Censuses

== Transport ==
There are no railways or major roads passing through the municipality.

== Sights ==
Among the protected cultural monuments in the municipality are a statue of Pietà from 1858 and a late Baroque calvary from the turn of the 18th and 19th centuries. The main landmark of Kubšice is the Church of Our Lady of Sorrows, built in 1907.
