= Sirotčí hrádek =

Ruins of a Gothic castle in the Czech Republic

- Klentnice, South Moravian Region in the Czech Republic
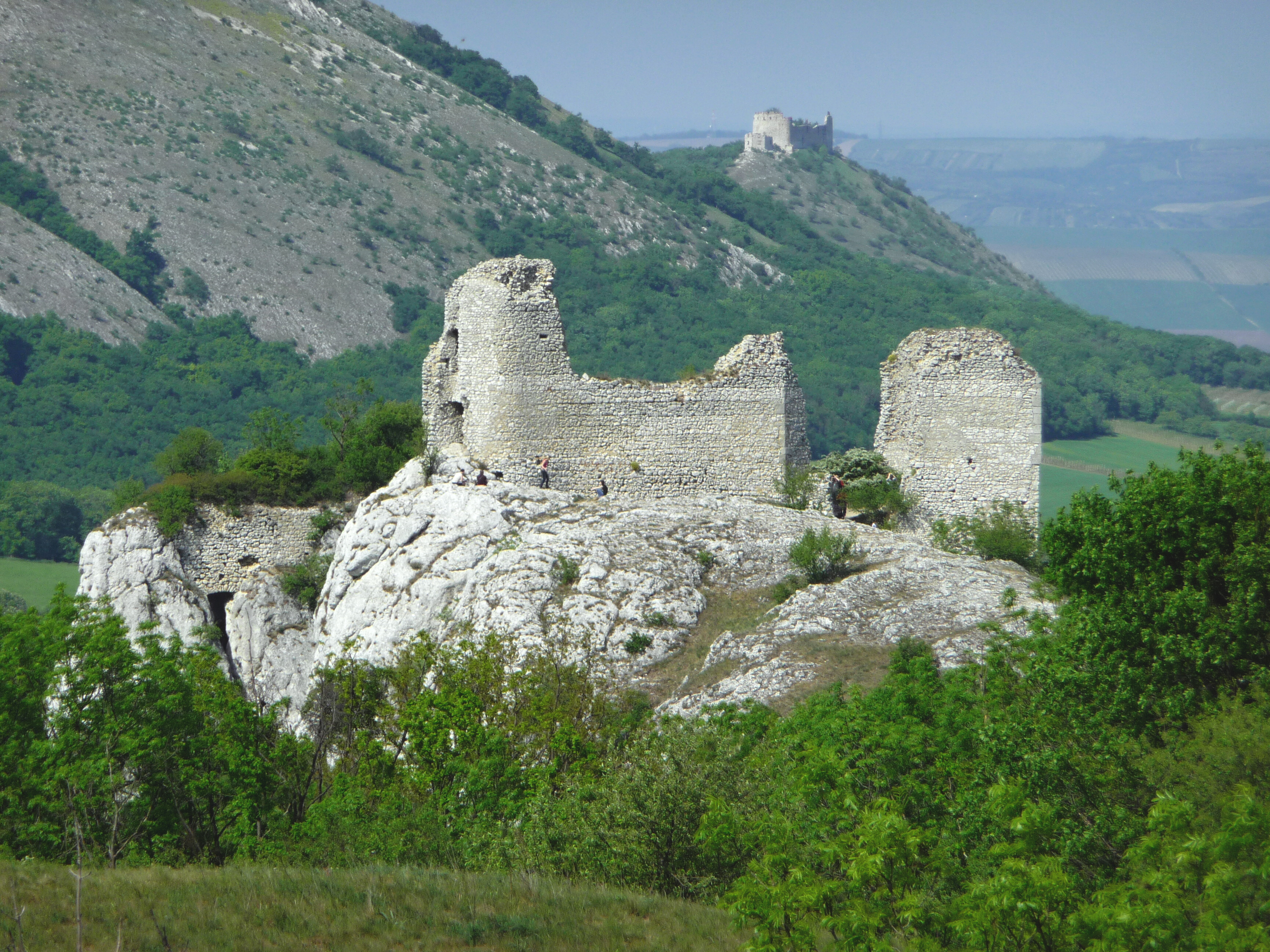
- Sirotčí hrádek with Děvičky in the background

Site information
- Type: Castle

Location
- Location in the Czech Republic
- Coordinates: 48°50′44″N 16°38′27″E

Site history
- Built: 13th century

Sirotčí hrádek (also Sirotčí hrad, Sirotčí hrady or Růžový hrad; German: Waisenstein or Rosenstein) is a ruin of a Gothic castle in the municipality Klentnice in the South Moravian Region of the Czech Republic. The origins of the castle date back to the 13th century, when it was built by the Wehingen family; the castle then belonged to the Liechtensteins and the Dietrichsteins, before being abandoned in the 16th century. It has been protected as a cultural monument since 1958.

== History ==
The castle was built in the middle of the 13th century by the Swabian Wehingen family, or rather their offshoot, which was founded by the knight Siegfried Sirotek. After the extinction of the Wehingen family, the castle came into the possession of King Wenceslas III in 1305, who was murdered a year later. Then the Liechtensteins acquired it. In 1575, the Dietrichsteins became the owners of the then desolate castle. Although the land registry from 1560 does not mention Sirotčí hrádek in 1590 it explicitly describes it as desolate.

== Location ==
The ruins are located about 20 kilometres (12 mi) northwest of Břeclav, above the village of Klentnice. It lies on the northern edge of Stolová hora, a hill of the Pavlov Hills within the Mikulov Highlands, at an altitude of 458 m (1,503 ft). It is situated in the Tabulová National Nature Reserve within the Pálava Protected Landscape Area.

== Description ==
The castle was built on two limestone cliffs, which were divided by a deep gorge, while the main part of the castle was located on the southern rock. The bridge probably led across the gorge. A three-storey palace was built on a smaller plateau of the southern rock. To the north, which is now inaccessible, was a prismatic watchtower. The whole fort was enclosed by a rampart and a palisade.

From the castle, the castle wall has been preserved on a southern rock 8 m (26 ft) high, in the middle of which there is a window opening. On the opposite side of the wall is the remains of a three-story palace several meters high. There are three window openings in it, two of which end in a broken arch. In the immediate vicinity of the wall is a cistern, which was used to supply the castle with water. Only relatively small remains of the castle masonry have been preserved on the northern rock.

== Reputation ==
Sirotčí hrádek is associated with the legend of the knight Čičos, who belonged to the Order of the Templars. He worked as a castellan in the castle. When his son was to be born, Čičos received a summons to his order. However, due to the birth of his son, Čičos refused. Shortly afterwards, a commander arrived at the castle, whom Čičos's wife Růžena asked to go to the newborn child as a godfather. According to the traditional custom, the name of the child is chosen by the godfather. The commander accepted the offer and gave the child the name Orphanus ("orphan"). After the birth of a child, he commanded the commander to execute Čičos for betraying the order, making Orphanus a true orphan. Then he had all the inhabitants of the castle executed (except for one), while the widow of Čičos's heart broke with grief. The commander left the castle and took Orphanus with him. When he returned to the castle years later, he found the only person there – an old man who had once escaped the Commander's wrath. When the old man told him what had happened to his parents at the time, Orphanus went insane and had to ride horses at night from Turold Castle.

== Depictions in film ==
- O statečném kováři ("The Brave Blacksmith") (1983, director: Petr Švéda)
- Třetí skoba pro Kocoura (1983, director: Radim Cvrček)

== See also ==
- List of castles in the South Moravian Region
