= Bavory =

- Municipality
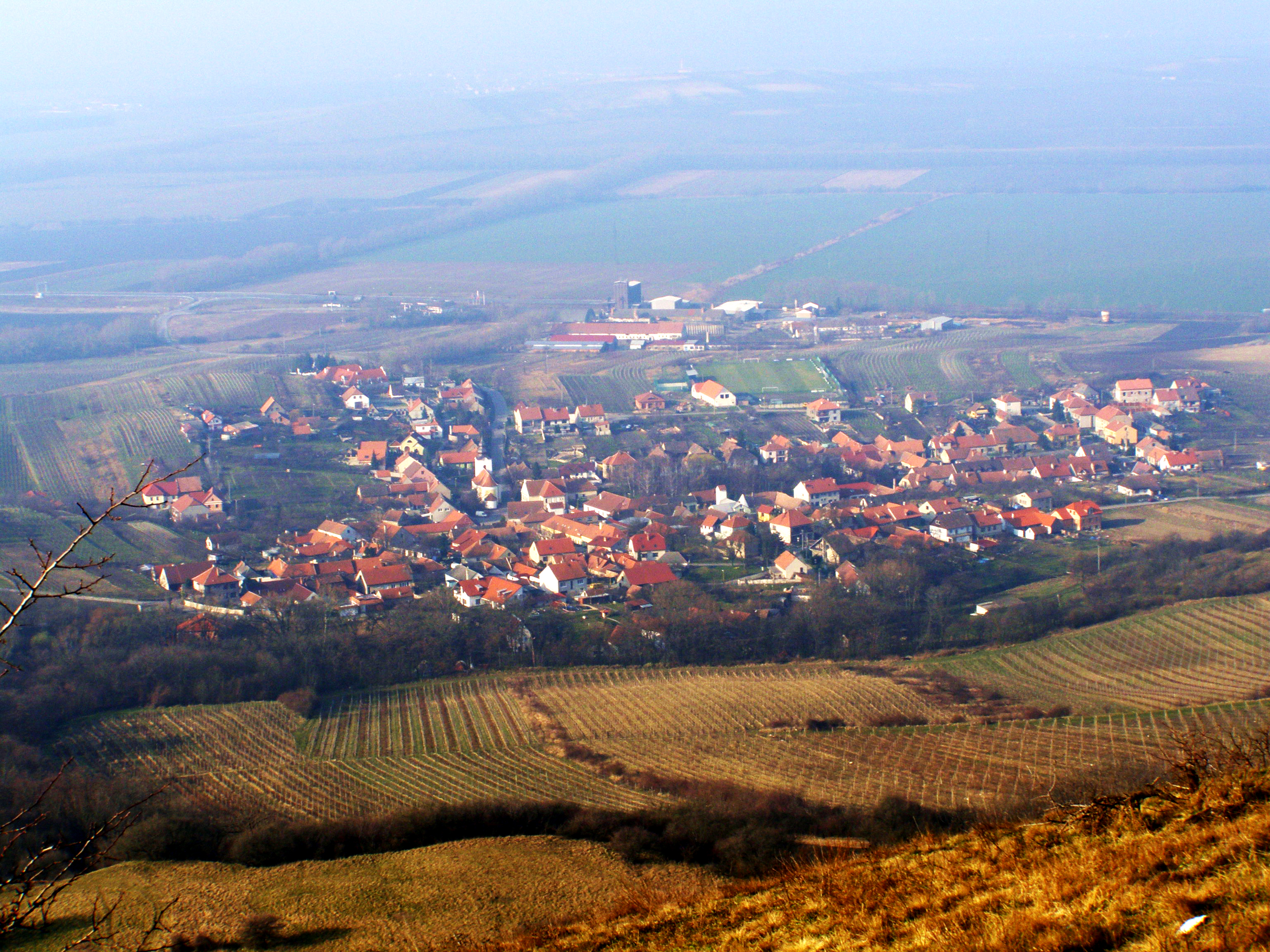
- View of Bavory from Stolová hora

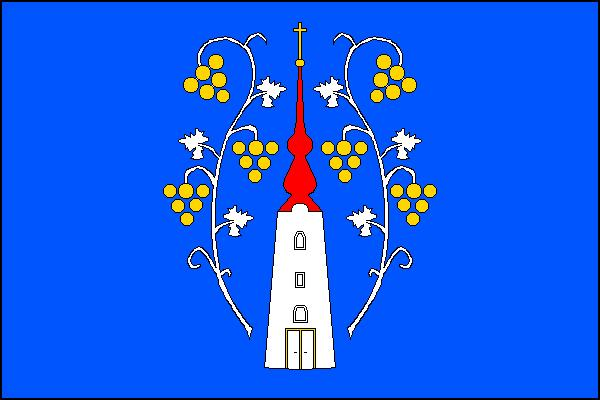
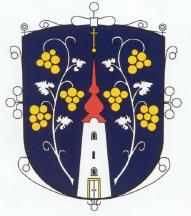
- Flag Coat of arms

- Location in the Czech Republic
- Coordinates: 48°50′5″N 16°37′20″E
- Country: Czech Republic
- Region: South Moravian
- District: Břeclav
- First mentioned: 1322

Area
  - Total: 5.00 km^{2} (1.93 sq mi)
- Elevation: 230 m (750 ft)

Population (2026-01-01)
  - Total: 423
  - Density: 84.6/km^{2} (219/sq mi)
- Time zone: UTC+1 (CET)
  - Summer (DST): UTC+2 (CEST)
- Postal code: 692 01
- Website: www.bavory.cz

Bavory (German: Pardorf) is a municipality and village in Břeclav District in the South Moravian Region of the Czech Republic. It has about 400 inhabitants.

== Demographics ==
Historical population
Year	Pop.	±%
1869	472	—
1880	554	+17.4%
1890	532	−4.0%
1900	546	+2.6%
1910	532	−2.6%
1921	476	−10.5%
1930	451	−5.3%
1950	342	−24.2%
1961	375	+9.6%
1970	341	−9.1%
1980	374	+9.7%
1991	391	+4.5%
2001	396	+1.3%
2011	402	+1.5%
2021	388	−3.5%
Source: Censuses
