= Klentnice =

- Municipality
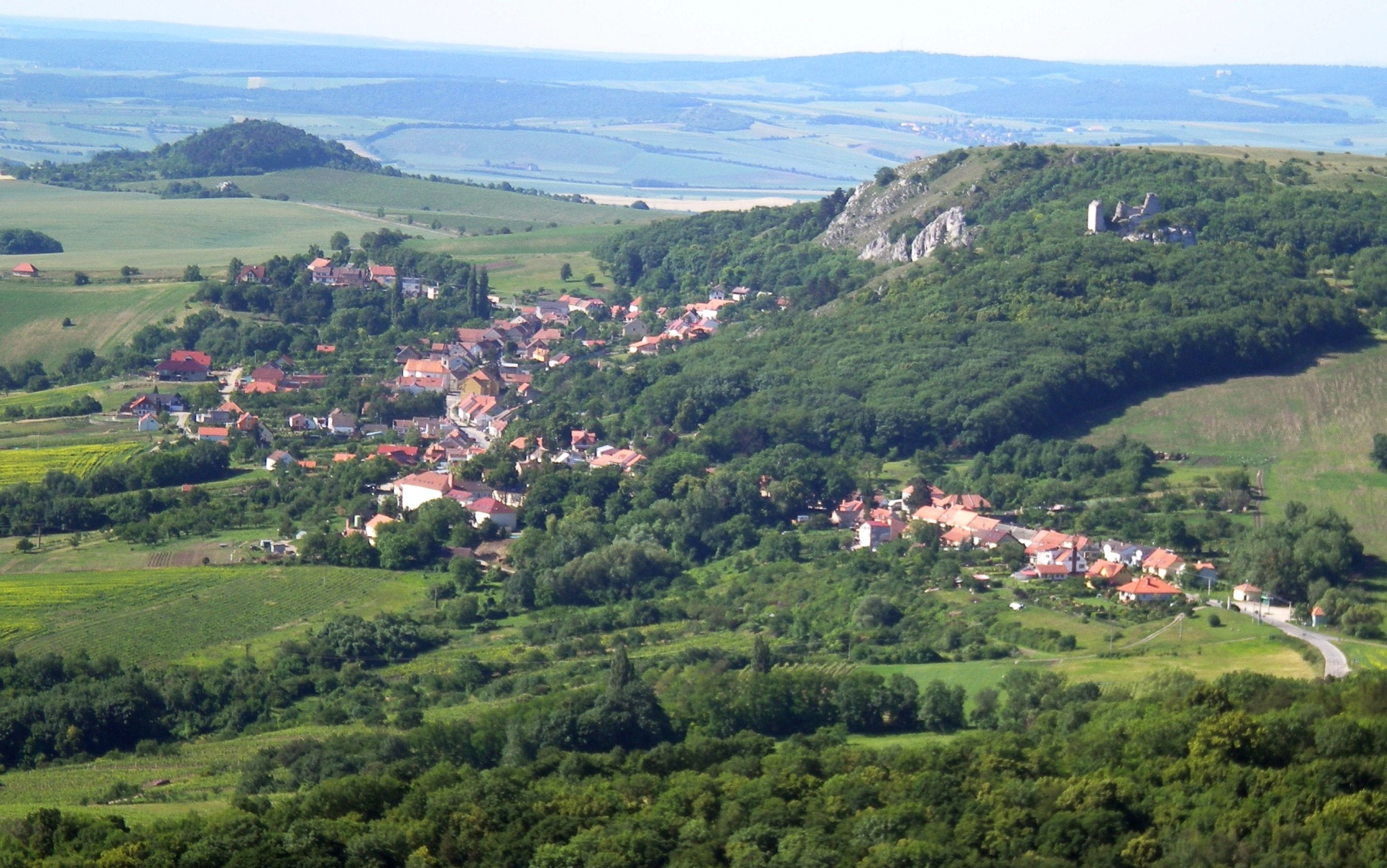
- Klentnice seen from Děvín

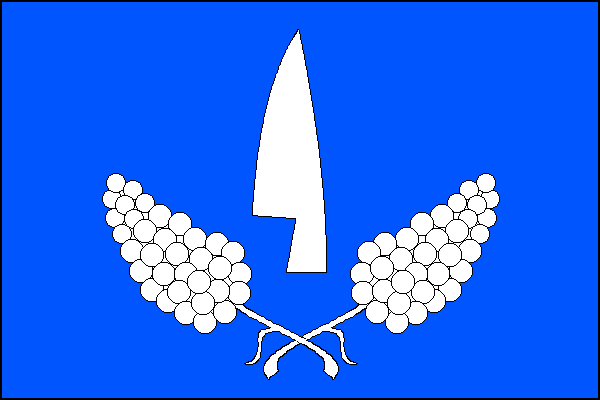
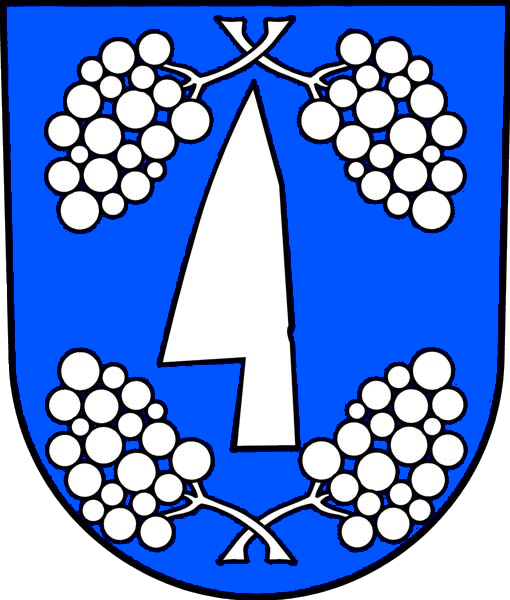
- Flag Coat of arms

- Location in the Czech Republic
- Coordinates: 48°50′41″N 16°38′41″E
- Country: Czech Republic
- Region: South Moravian
- District: Břeclav
- First mentioned: 1322

Area
  - Total: 7.69 km^{2} (2.97 sq mi)
- Elevation: 334 m (1,096 ft)

Population (2026-01-01)
  - Total: 465
  - Density: 60.5/km^{2} (157/sq mi)
- Time zone: UTC+1 (CET)
  - Summer (DST): UTC+2 (CEST)
- Postal code: 692 01
- Website: www.klentnice.cz

Klentnice (German: Klentnitz) is a municipality and village in Břeclav District in the South Moravian Region of the Czech Republic. It has about 500 inhabitants.

== Geography ==
Klentnice is located about 20 kilometres (12 mi) northwest of Břeclav and 37 km (23 mi) south of Brno. It lies in the Mikulov Highlands. The village is situated on the eastern slope of the hill Stolová hora, which has an elevation of 459 m (1,506 ft). The highest point of the municipality is the slope of the hill Obora at 478 m (1,568 ft) above sea level. Klentnice is located within the Pálava Protected Landscape Area.

== History ==
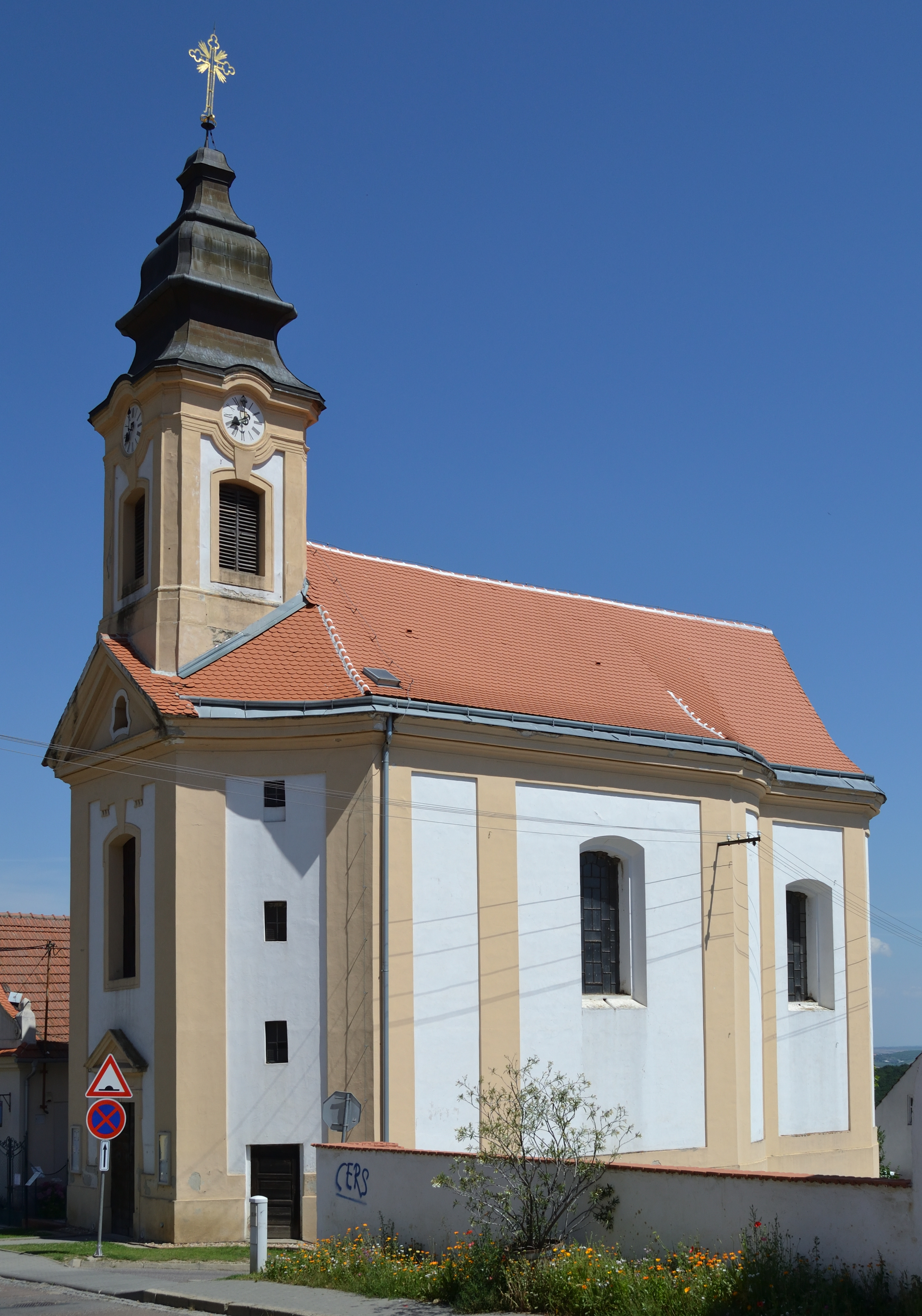
Church of Saint George

Grave findings of the La Tène culture are documents of an early settlement. In the times of Great Moravia, the area was inhabited by the Slavs. After the empire fell, the inhabitants were replaced by German colonists. The first written mention of Klentnice is from 1322, when it was part of the Mikulov estate.

As a part of the Mikulov estate, it was owned by the Liechtenstein family. They contributed to cultural and ethnic enrichment when they invited Jews and Anabaptists. In 1560, the Liechtensteins sold the estate to the Kerecseny family. In 1575, the estate was donated to the Dietrichstein family by Emperor Maximillian II. During their rule in the second half of the 17th century and in the 18th century, the estate prospered and developed.

After World War I, the multi-ethnic state Austria-Hungary was split up. By the Treaty of Saint-Germain-en-Laye, Klentnice became part of the newly established Czechoslovakia. Following the Munich Agreement, the municipality belonged to the Reichsgau Niederdonau until 1945. After World War II, the municipality fell back to Czechoslovakia and the German-speaking population was expelled. The town was recolonised by ethnic Czechs mainly from Moravian Slovakia.

== Demographics ==
Historical population

| Year | Pop. | ±% |
|---|---|---|
| 1869 | 434 | — |
| 1880 | 494 | +13.8% |
| 1890 | 446 | −9.7% |
| 1900 | 525 | +17.7% |
| 1910 | 609 | +16.0% |

| Year | Pop. | ±% |
|---|---|---|
| 1921 | 630 | +3.4% |
| 1930 | 556 | −11.7% |
| 1950 | 373 | −32.9% |
| 1961 | 438 | +17.4% |
| 1970 | 444 | +1.4% |

| Year | Pop. | ±% |
|---|---|---|
| 1980 | 484 | +9.0% |
| 1991 | 512 | +5.8% |
| 2001 | 558 | +9.0% |
| 2011 | 518 | −7.2% |
| 2021 | 484 | −6.6% |

Source: Censuses

== Transport ==
There are no railways or major roads passing through the municipality.

== Sights ==
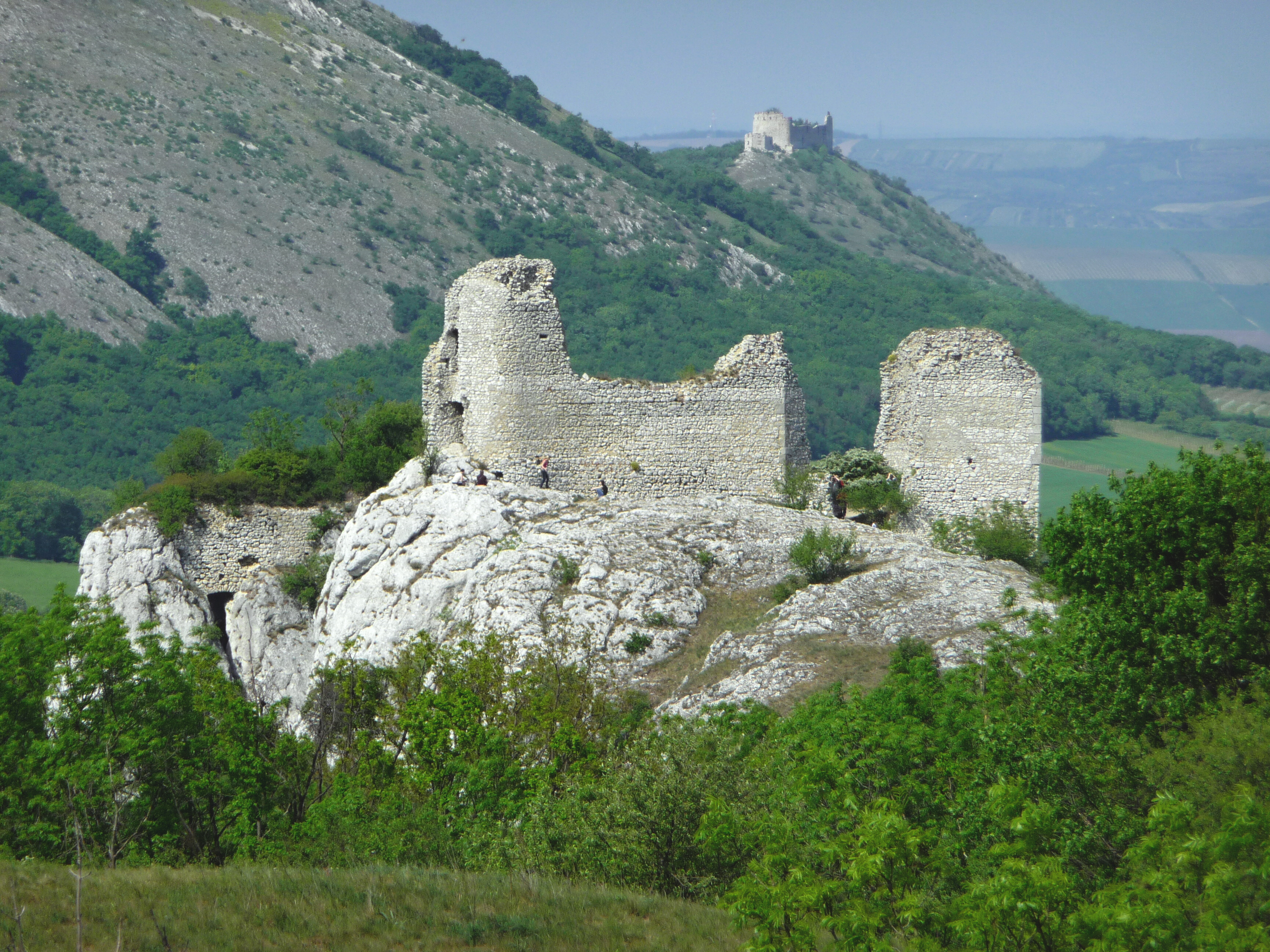
Sirotčí hrádek

The Church of Saint George was first mentioned in 1582. The current structure was built in 1783–1785.

The ruin of the castle Sirotčí hrádek is located above the village. The castle was founded at the turn of 13th and 14th centuries. It was abandoned before 1590 and referred to as completely desolated in 1629.
