= Horní Věstonice =

- Municipality
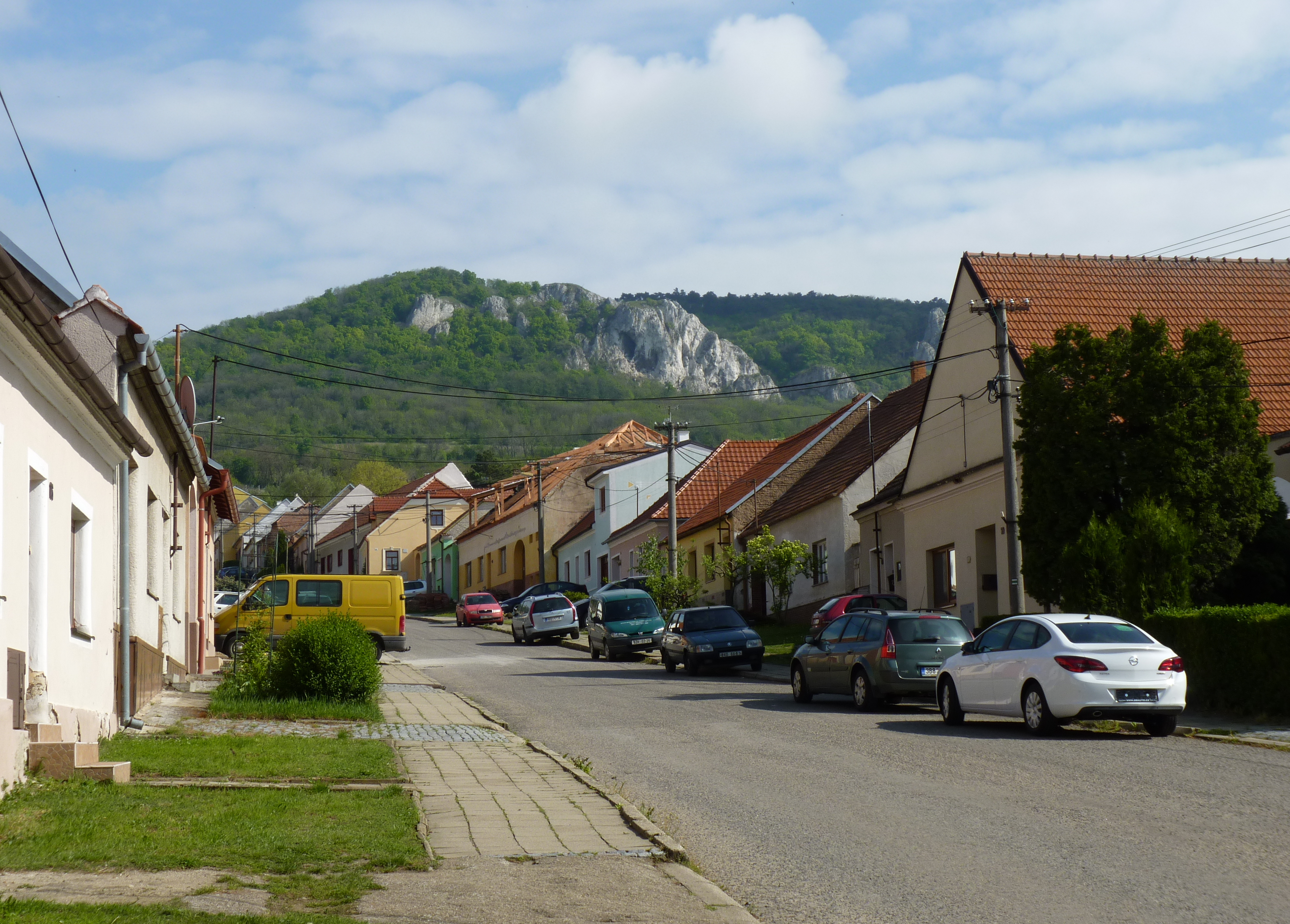
- A street in Horní Věstonice

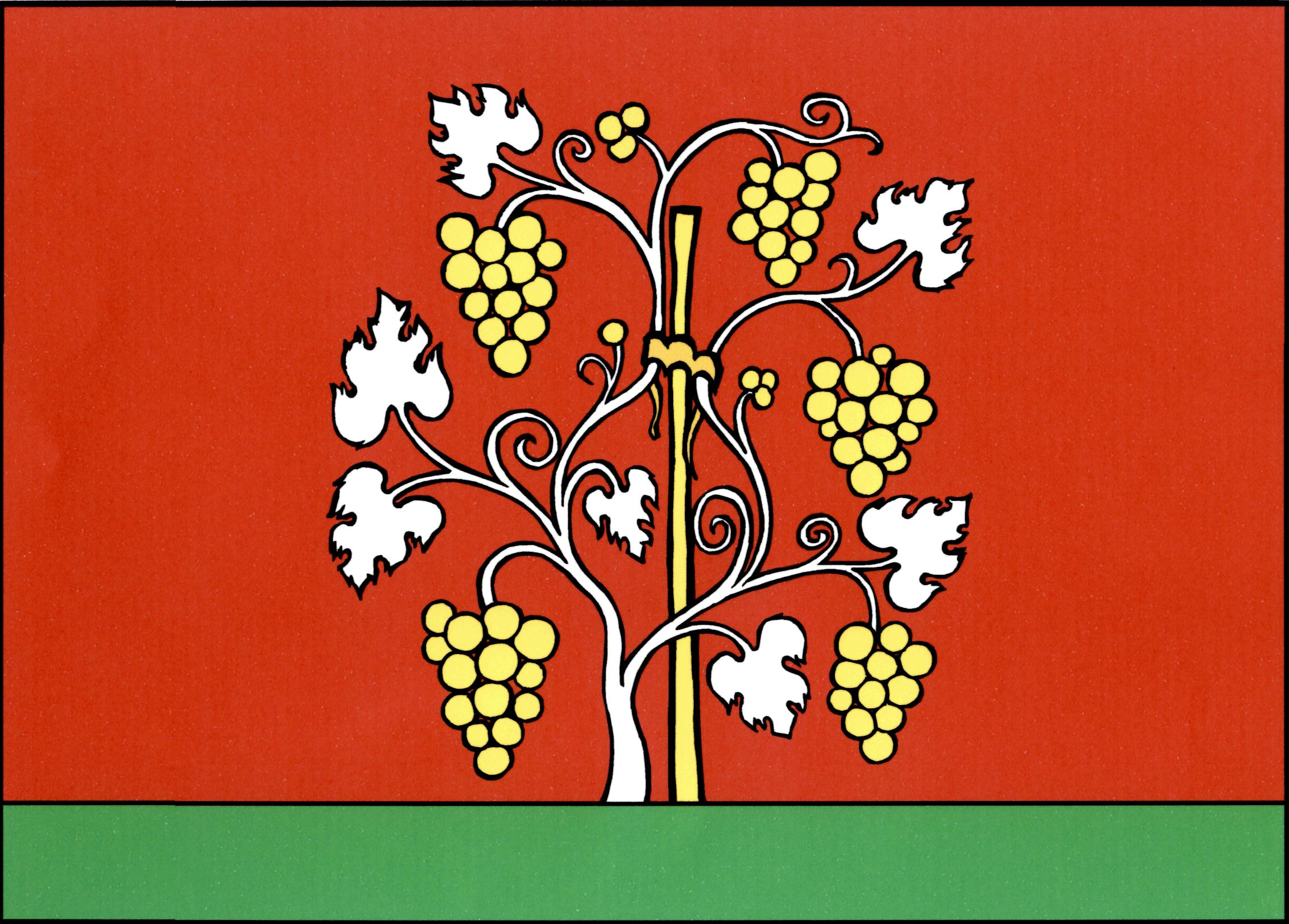
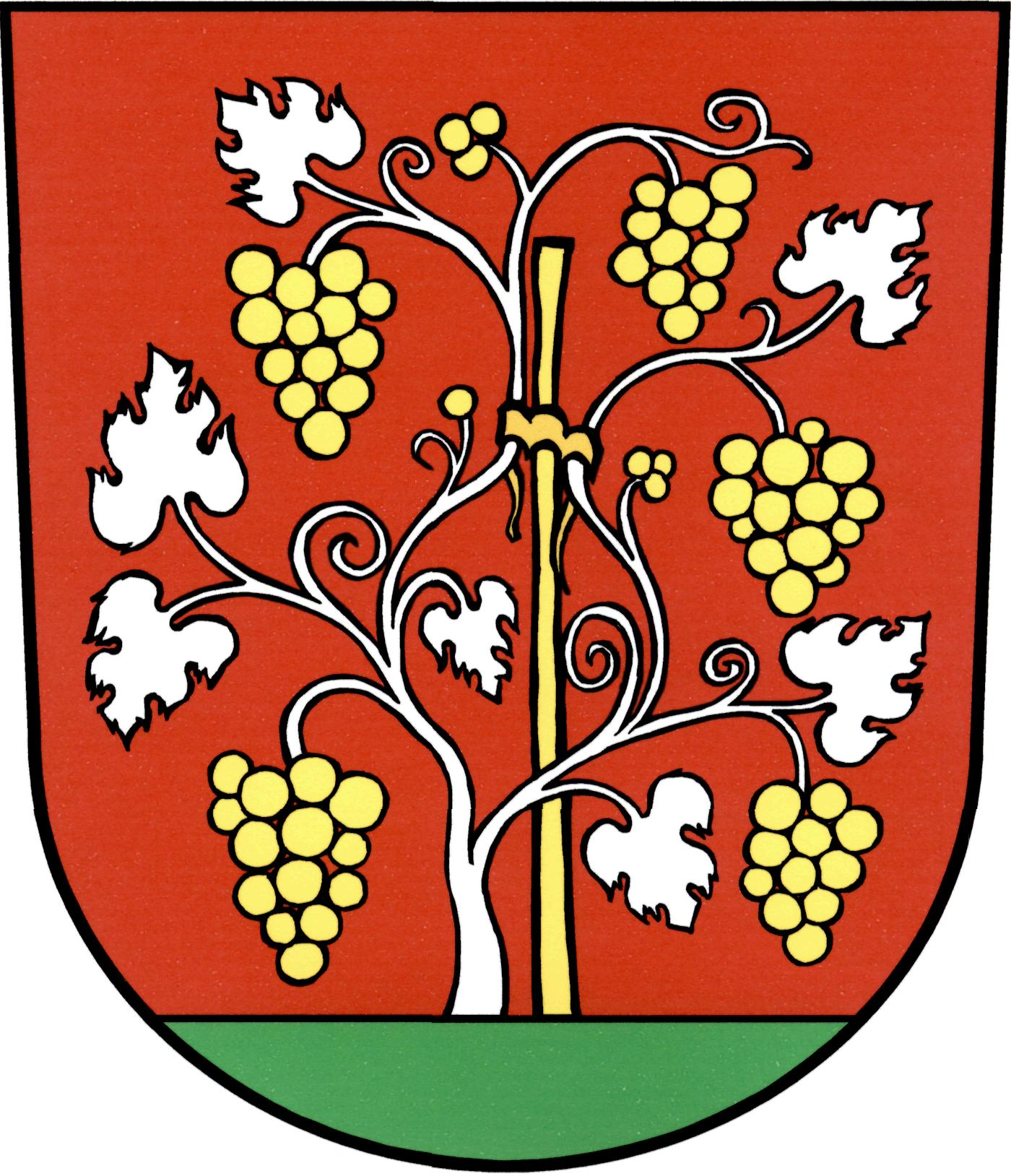
- Flag Coat of arms

- Location in the Czech Republic
- Coordinates: 48°52′28″N 16°37′32″E
- Country: Czech Republic
- Region: South Moravian
- District: Břeclav
- First mentioned: 1414

Area
  - Total: 7.81 km^{2} (3.02 sq mi)
- Elevation: 210 m (690 ft)

Population (2026-01-01)
  - Total: 526
  - Density: 67.3/km^{2} (174/sq mi)
- Time zone: UTC+1 (CET)
  - Summer (DST): UTC+2 (CEST)
- Postal code: 691 81
- Website: www.horni-vestonice.cz

Horní Věstonice (German: Oberwisternitz) is a municipality and village in Břeclav District in the South Moravian Region of the Czech Republic. It has about 500 inhabitants.

Horní Věstonice lies approximately 24 kilometres (15 mi) north-west of Břeclav, 36 km (22 mi) south of Brno, and 209 km (130 mi) south-east of Prague.

== Demographics ==
Historical population
Year	Pop.	±%
1869	755	—
1880	782	+3.6%
1890	834	+6.6%
1900	782	−6.2%
1910	770	−1.5%
1921	734	−4.7%
1930	738	+0.5%
1950	549	−25.6%
1961	569	+3.6%
1970	556	−2.3%
1980	504	−9.4%
1991	452	−10.3%
2001	447	−1.1%
2011	425	−4.9%
2021	480	+12.9%
Source: Censuses
