= Drnholec =

- Market town
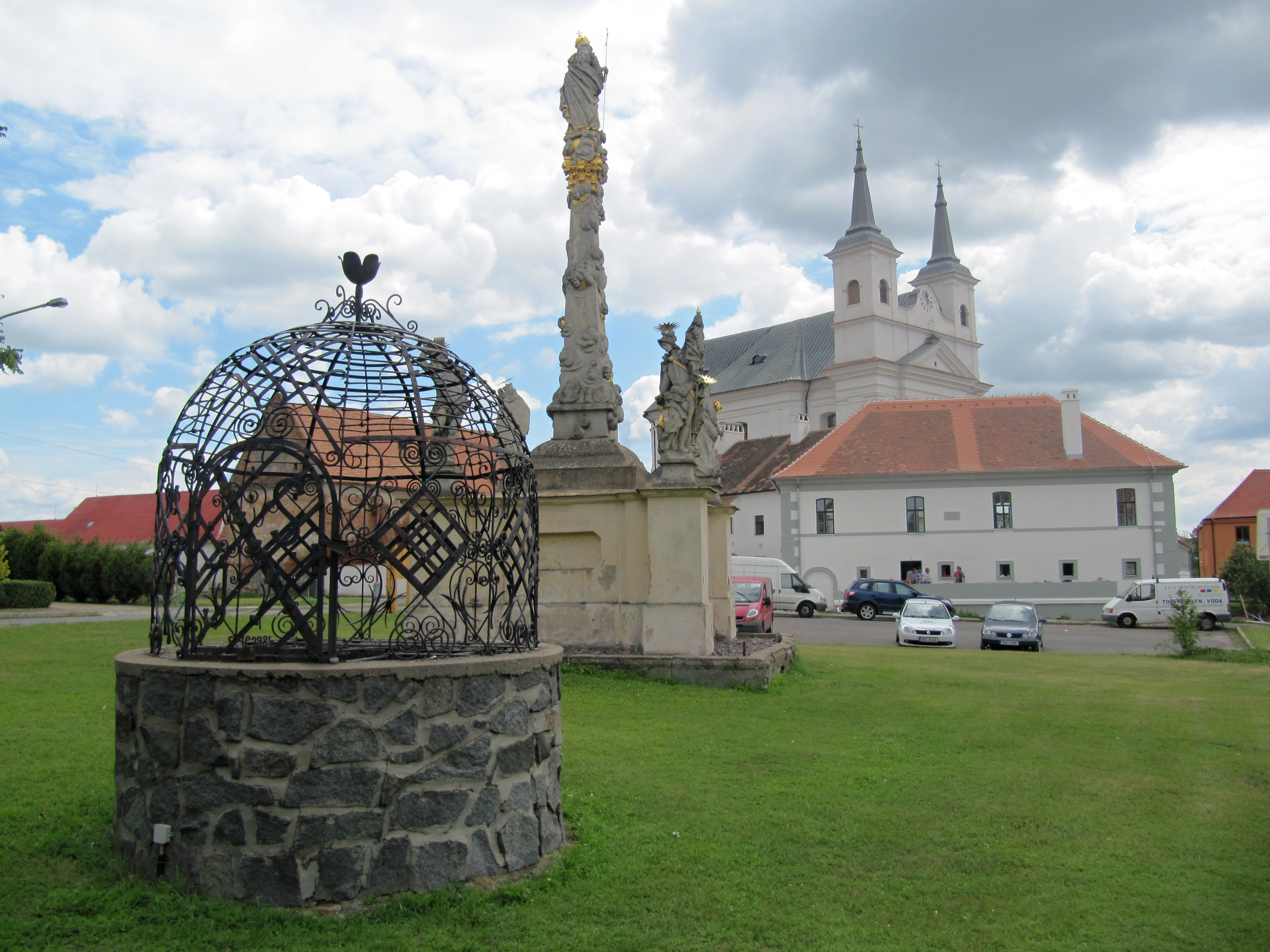
- Centre with the Church of the Holy Trinity

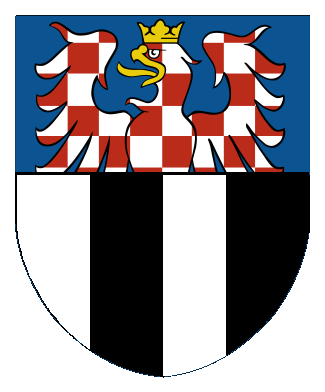
- Flag Coat of arms

- Location in the Czech Republic
- Coordinates: 48°51′56″N 16°28′43″E
- Country: Czech Republic
- Region: South Moravian
- District: Břeclav
- First mentioned: 1249

Area
  - Total: 35.19 km^{2} (13.59 sq mi)
- Elevation: 183 m (600 ft)

Population (2026-01-01)
  - Total: 1,817
  - Density: 51.63/km^{2} (133.7/sq mi)
- Time zone: UTC+1 (CET)
  - Summer (DST): UTC+2 (CEST)
- Postal code: 691 83
- Website: www.drnholec.eu

Drnholec (Czech pronunciation: [ˈdrnɦolɛts]; German: Dürnholz) is a market town in Břeclav District in the South Moravian Region of the Czech Republic. It has about 1,800 inhabitants.

== Geography ==
Drnholec is located about 31 kilometres (19 mi) northwest of Břeclav and 37 km (23 mi) south of Brno. It lies in the Dyje–Svratka Valley. The market town is situated on the banks of the Thaya River. The western tip of the Nové Mlýny reservoirs, built on the Thaya, extends into the territory of Drnholec.

== History ==
The first written mention of Drnholec is from 1249. From 1350, it was referred to as a market town. From 1394, Drnholec was ruled by a branch of the Liechtenstein family. In 1578, the Drnholec estate was sold to the Teuffenbach family. They had rebuilt the local dilapidated castle into a Renaissance aristocratic residence and expanded the estate. The Teuffenbachs owned Drnholec until the death of last Teuffenbach in 1653. After that, the estate was inherited by the Sternberg family.

== Demographics ==
Historical population

Year	Pop.	±%
1869	2,808	—
1880	3,024	+7.7%
1890	3,045	+0.7%
1900	2,966	−2.6%
1910	2,889	−2.6%

Year	Pop.	±%
1921	2,821	−2.4%
1930	2,896	+2.7%
1950	1,484	−48.8%
1961	1,863	+25.5%
1970	1,775	−4.7%

Year	Pop.	±%
1980	1,718	−3.2%
1991	1,766	+2.8%
2001	1,739	−1.5%
2011	1,620	−6.8%
2021	1,796	+10.9%

Source: Censuses

== Transport ==
There are no railways or major roads passing through the municipality.

== Sights ==
The main landmark of Drnholec is the Church of the Holy Trinity. It was built in the Baroque style in 1750–1757.

The Drnholec Castle has a Gothic core from the 14th century, which was rebuilt in the Renaissance style in 1583. In the 18th century, it was rebuilt to its present form.

A notable building is the Renaissance town hall. It dates from 1591. The southeastern wing was built in 1840.
