= Dyje–Svratka Valley =

Valley in South Moravian Region, Czech Republic

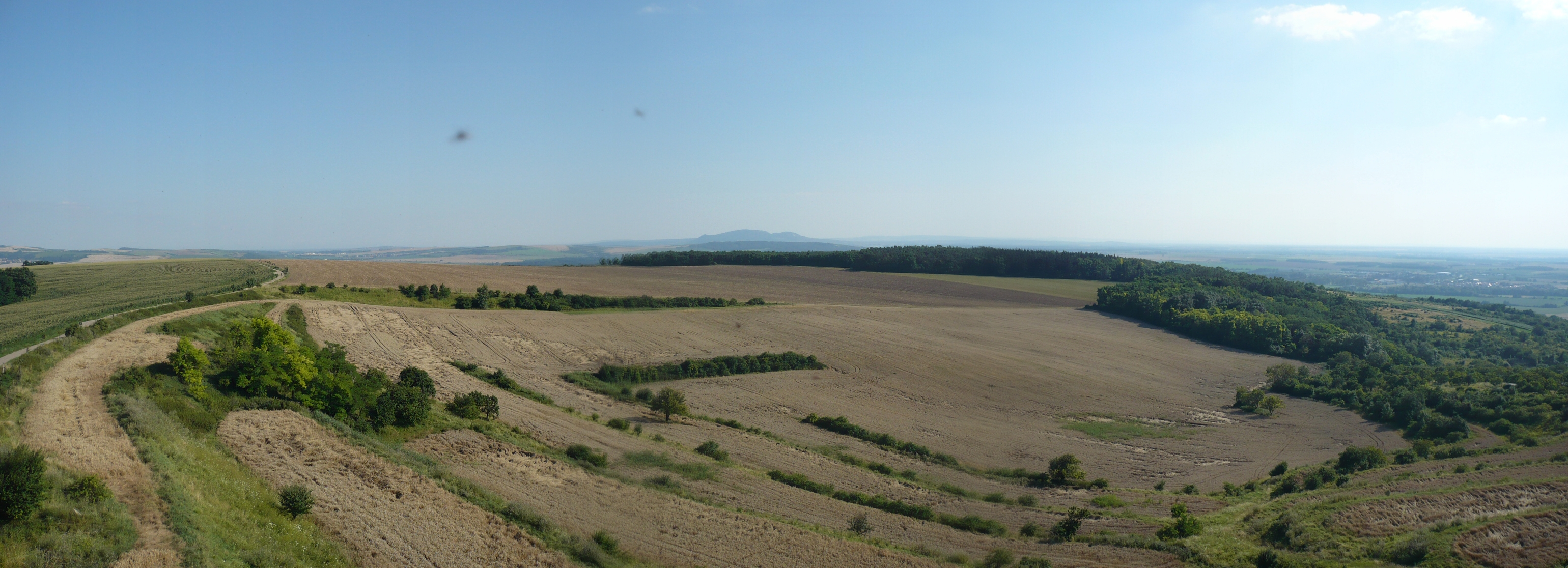
- View from the Výhon hill to the Dyje–Svratka Valley

Highest point
- Peak: Výhon
- Elevation: 355 m (1,165 ft)

Dimensions
- Length: 83 km (52 mi)
- Area: 1,452 km^{2} (561 mi^{2})

Geography
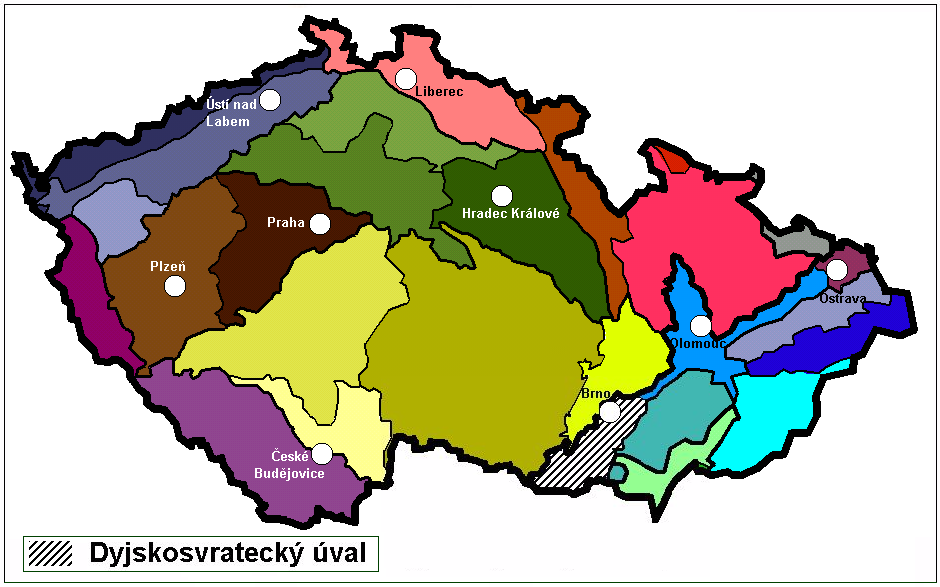
- Dyje–Svratka Valley in the geomorphological system of the Czech Republic
- Country: Czech Republic
- Region: South Moravian
- Range coordinates: 48°56′N 16°29′E
- Parent range: Outer Subcarpathia

Geology
- Orogenies: Alpide belt, outer depression
- Rock age: Neogene
- Rock type(s): Gravel and sand

The Dyje–Svratka Valley (Czech: Dyjsko-svratecký úval) is a valley and a geomorphological mesoregion of the Czech Republic. It is located in the South Moravian Region. Its name is derived from the rivers Thaya (Dyje) and Svratka.

== Geomorphology ==
The Dyje–Svratka Valley is a mesoregion of Outer Subcarpathia within the Western Carpathians. It is mainly a lowland area. Beyond the Czech–Austrian state border, it smoothly transforms into the Weinviertel area. The northern part of the Dyje–Svratka Valley is undulating and includes several isolated hills. The valley is further subdivided into the microregions of the Jaroslavice Uplands, Dnholec Uplands, Dyje–Svratka Floodplain, Dunajovice Hills, Rajhrad Uplands and Prace Upland.

The area is poor in peaks. The highest and most distinctive peak is Výhon at 355 metres (1,165 ft) above sea level. A significant feature in the relief is the isolated hill of Pracký kopec at 325 m (1,066 ft), also historically known as the centre of the Battle of Austerlitz.

== Geography ==
The territory is elongated from the southwest to the northeast. It has an area of 1,452 square kilometres (561 sq mi) and an average elevation of 210 metres (690 ft). The floodplains of several rivers is in the Dyje–Svratka Valley, including Svratka, Jihlava, Svitava, Thaya, Jevišovka and Litava. Drainage runs into the Morava River, from there into the Danube basin and finally into the Black Sea. The Nové Mlýny reservoirs, built on the confluence of the Thaya and Svratka, include the lowest point of the Dyje–Svratka Valley at 170 m (560 ft) above sea level.

The area is rich in settlements. The southeastern half of the city of Brno is located within the Dyje–Svratka Valley. Other towns in the territory are Šlapanice, Slavkov u Brna, Pohořelice, Rajhrad, Židlochovice, Hrušovany nad Jevišovkou and Újezd u Brna.

== Transport ==
Highways that traverse the Dyje–Svratka Valley include D1 from Brno to Ostrava, D2 from Brno to Břeclav and Bratislava, and D52 from Brno to Vienna.

== Land use ==
Forests cover only 11.7% of the area. The territory is mostly by riparian forest (oaks, populus and willows), with higher areas forested by black locust. The lowlands are intensively farmed, with significant numbers of orchards (peaches, walnuts, apricots and almonds), vineyards and small woods. Only a few small sections are still covered by natural vegetation. The southern part of the valley contains numerous vineyards that are part of the wine making sub-regions of Mikulovská and Znojemská.

Due to urban expansion, climate change, and agricultural intensification, the Dyje-Svratka Valley has faced increasing environmental pressures in the recent years. Habitat fragmentation, declining groundwater levels, and soil erosion have posed many challenges to both sustainable land use and biodiversity. Effortss to balance ecological stewardship with wine producing have also gained popularity, specifically in the Mikulovská subregion, where the vintners and conservation groups cooperate to reduce pesticide use.

== Gallery ==
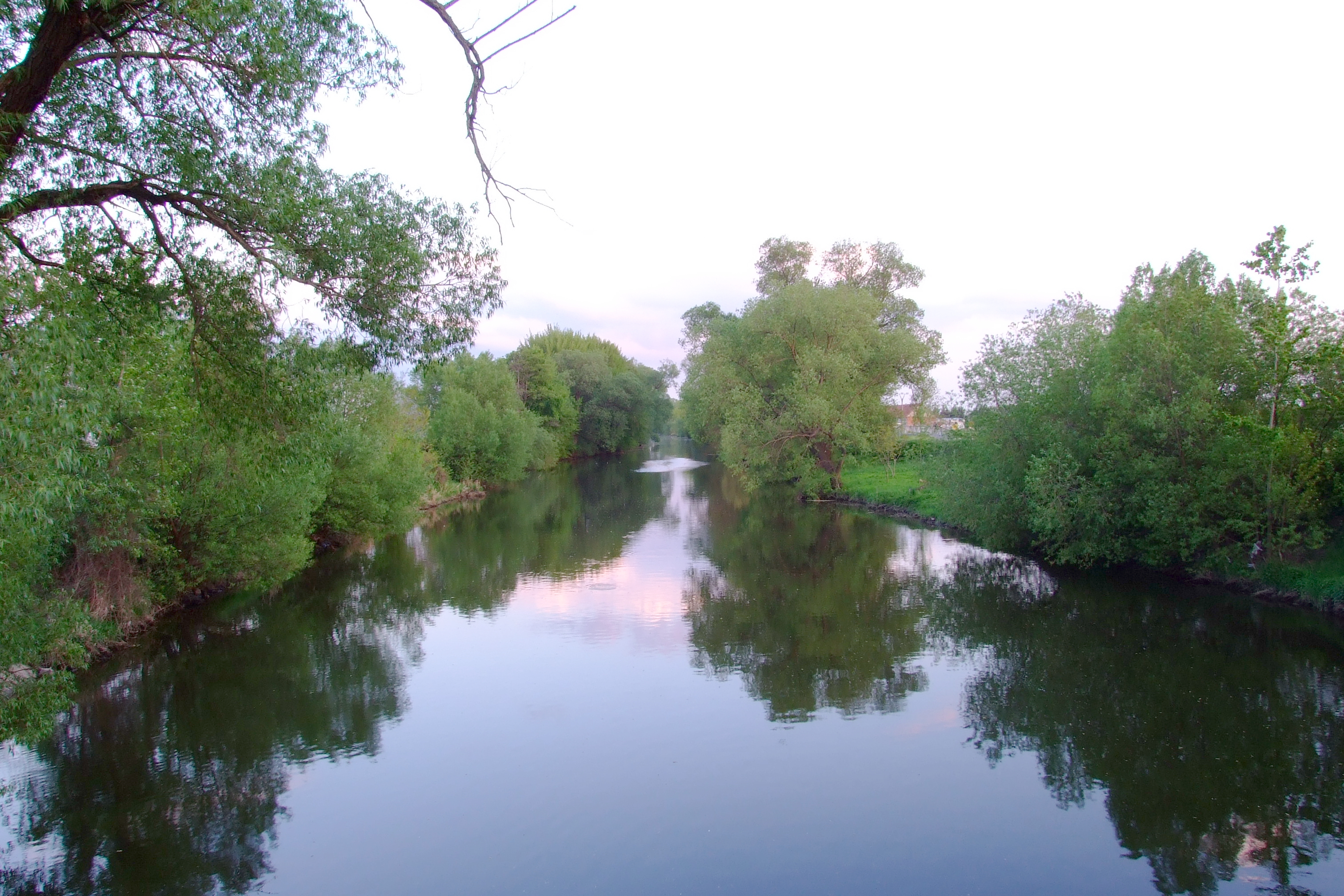
The Svratka south of Brno

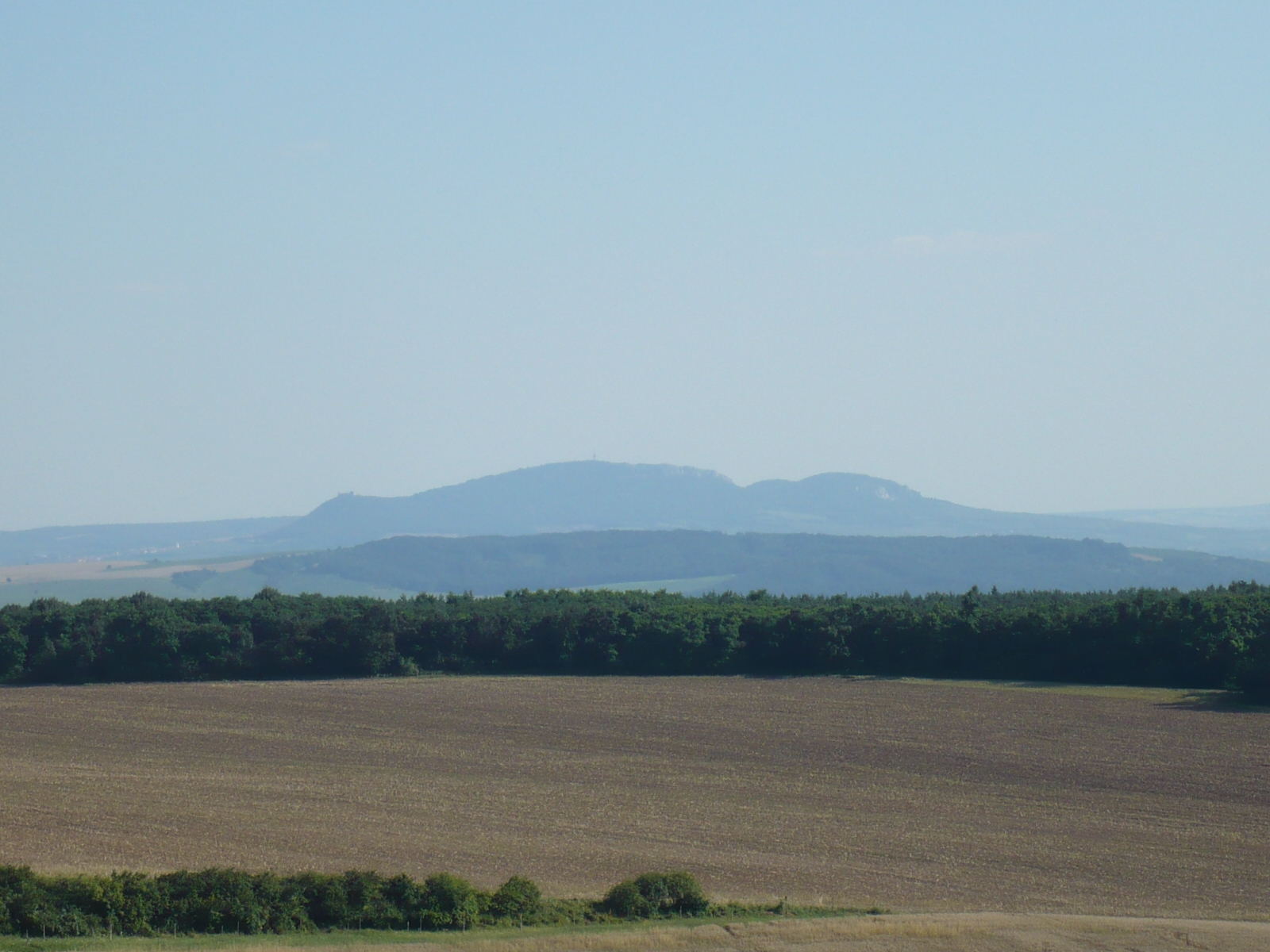
View from Výhon

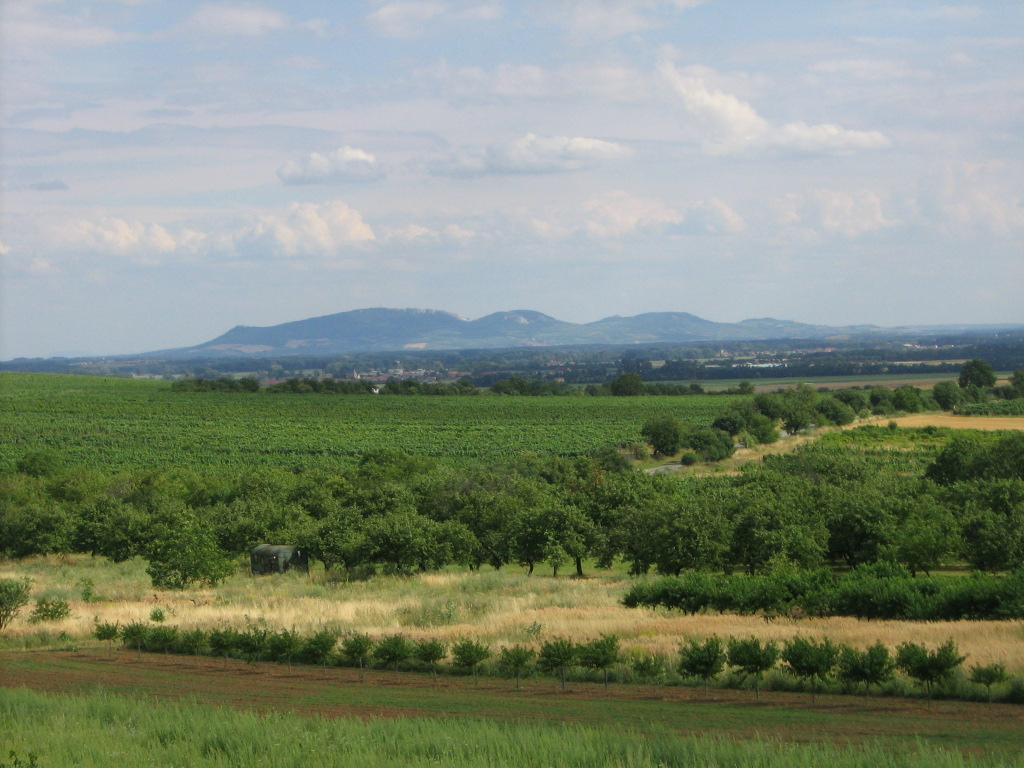
View from Dolní Kounice to the southeast

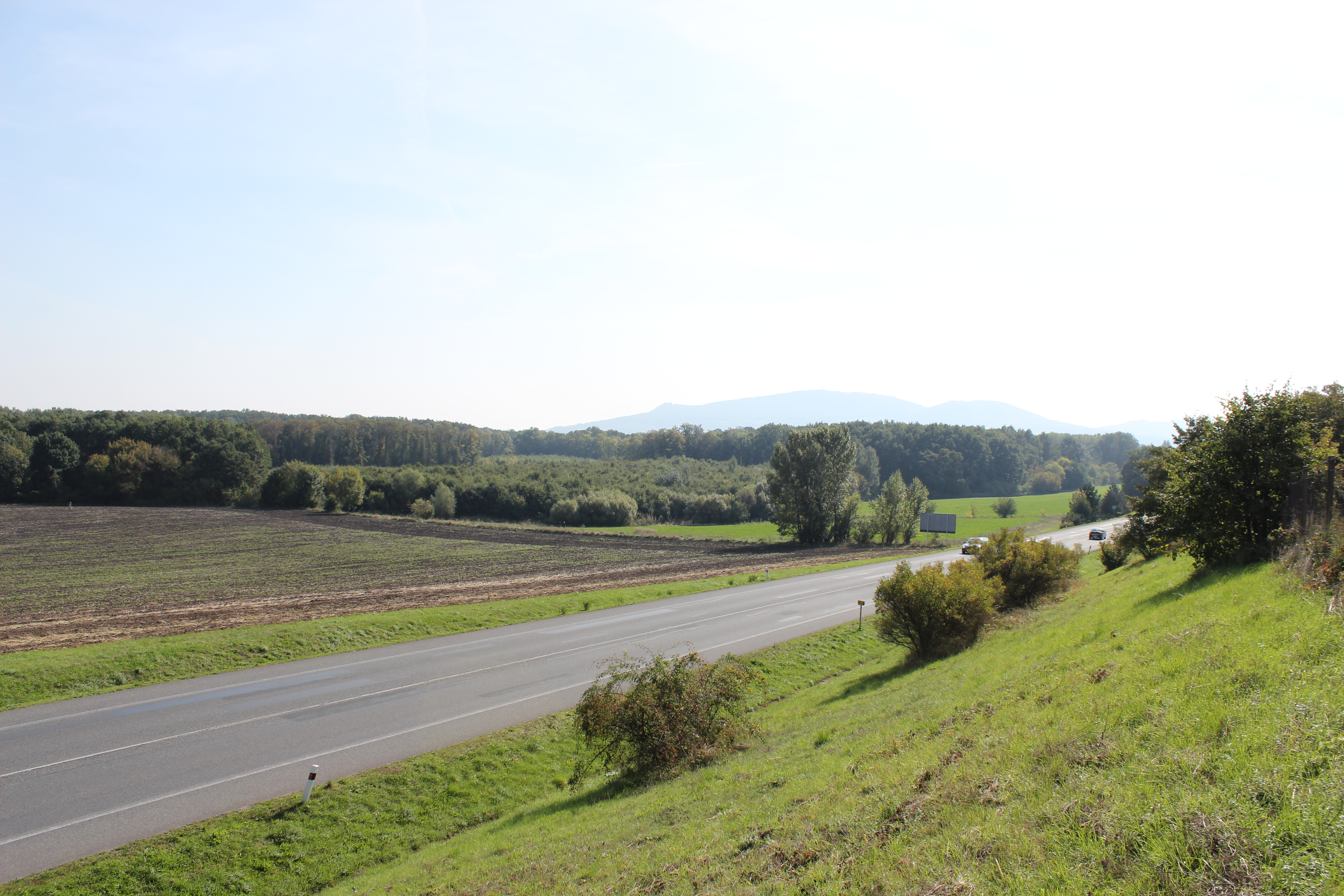
Floodplain near the Jihlava River

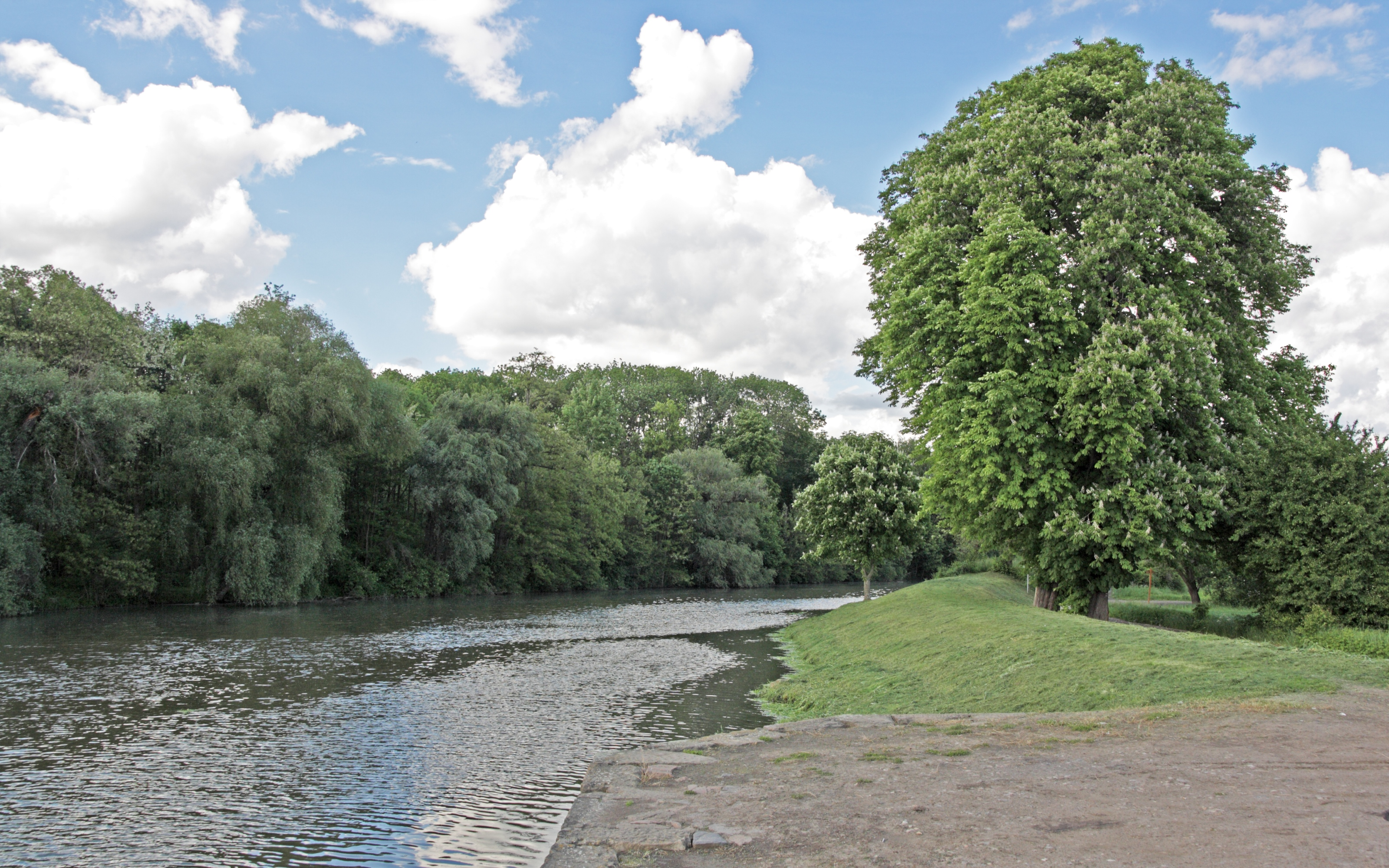
The Svratka in Rajhrad
