= Czech wine =

Wine making in Czech Republic

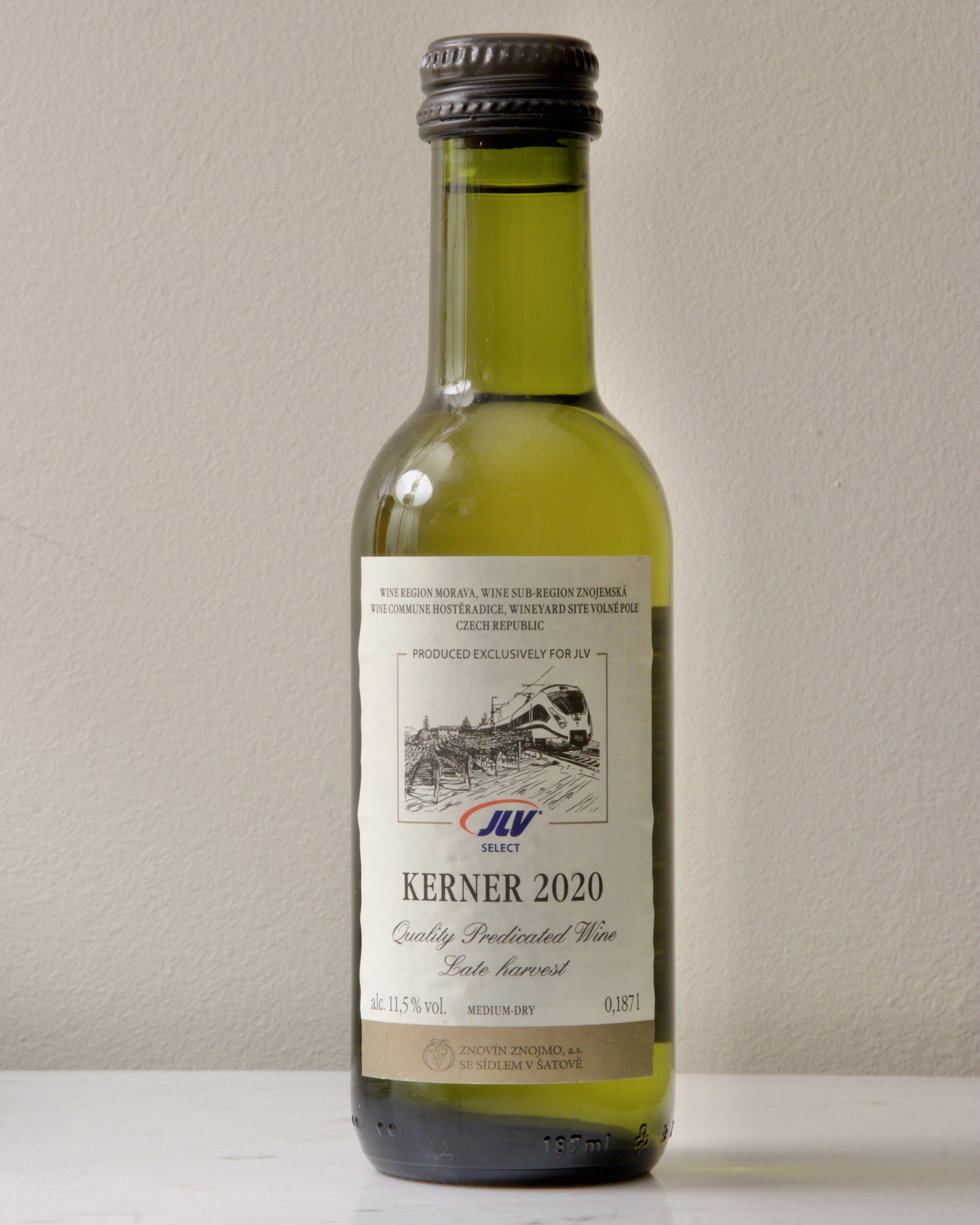
Bottle of Czech white wine

Wine in the Czech Republic is produced mainly in southern Moravia, although a few vineyards are located in Bohemia. However, Moravia accounts for around 96% of the country's vineyards, which is why Czech wine is more often referred to as Moravian wine. Production centers on local grape varieties, but there has been an increase in the production of established international strains such as Cabernet Sauvignon.

The history of Czech wine can be traced back to the Roman Empire's rule in the 2nd century.

== History ==
In the 2nd Century CE, the Roman 10th Legion based at Vindobona built an extensive outpost near the Amber Road and the Pálava Hills in Mikulovská, near the present-day village of Pasohlávky. Around the year 278, the Roman Emperor Marcus Aurelius Probus annulled the edict of Emperor Domitian that had prohibited the planting of grapes in colonies north of the Alps, and encouraged the planting of new vines in the northern Roman colonies. Modern-day archaeological excavations of the ancient Roman outpost near Pasohlávky have yielded many artifacts, including a vine pruning knife. Wine historians theorize that, during the Roman occupation, the Grüner Veltliner and Welschriesling grape varieties may have been introduced to the region. Viticulture was practiced during the Great Moravian Empire (833–906), as evidenced by numerous pruning knives and grape seeds unearthed during archaeological excavations of Slavic settlements.

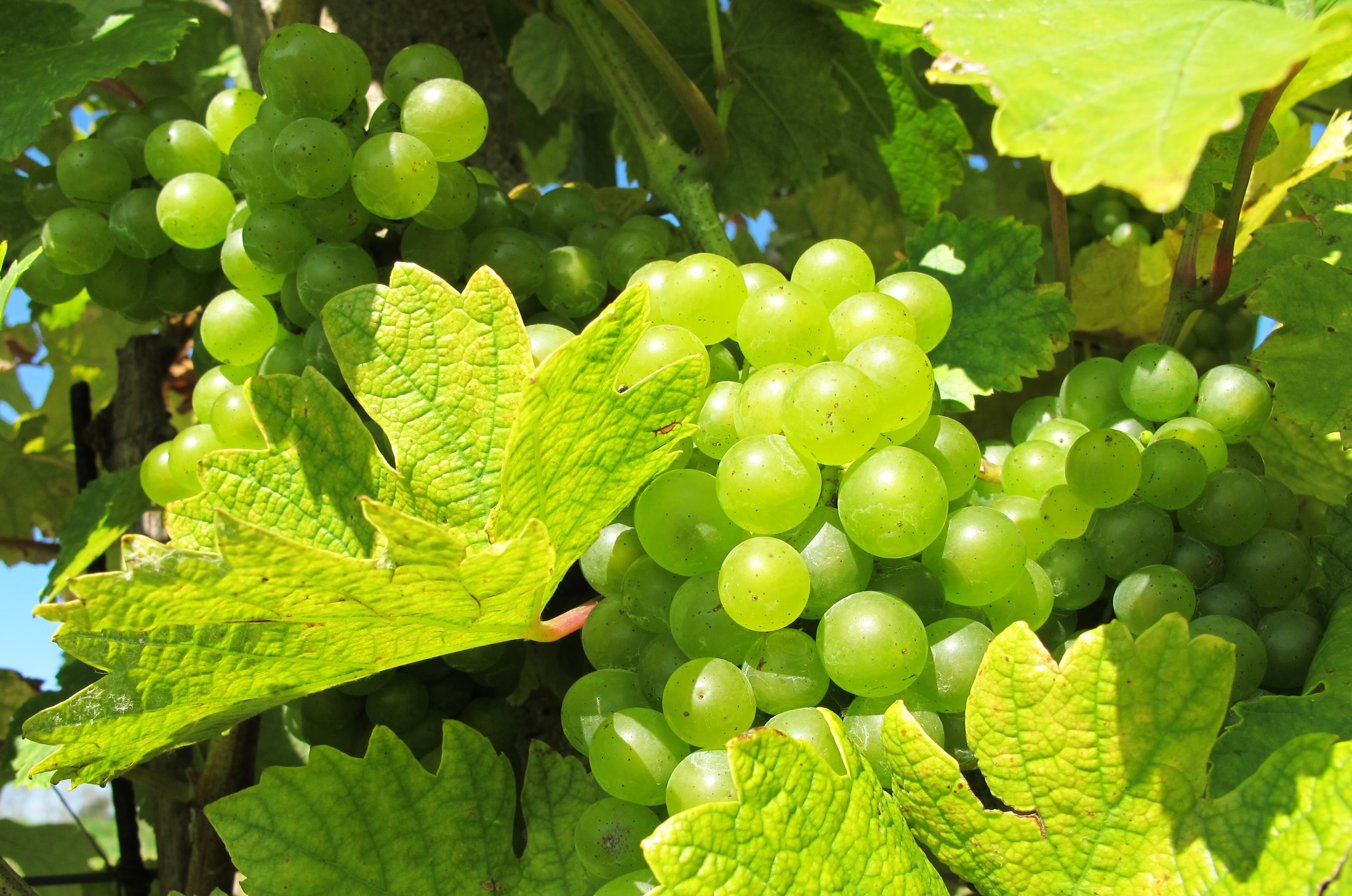
Grapes in Pálava region (1)

Around 875, according to legend, the Great Moravian Prince Svatopluk sent the Bohemian Prince Bořivoj a barrel of wine to celebrate the birth of his son Spytihněv. Bořivoj's wife Ludmila sacrificed some of the wine to Krosyně (goddess of the harvest) while making a plea for abundant rain. Her wish came true, the crop was saved and Bořivoj and Ludmila planted the first Bohemian vineyards around Mělník. Their grandson Saint Wenceslas later learned how to cultivate vines in these vineyards and make wine. He is honored by Czech winemakers as "Supremus Magister Vinearum" (Supreme Burgomaster of the Vineyards) and every year at the end of September a wine festival is held in Mělník on Feast of St. Wenceslas.

During the 13th century, monasteries helped to establish large vineyard areas which were planted with grape varieties imported from France and Germany. The vine training and pruning methods of these countries were also adopted. The vineyard groupings made it easier to maintain the vineyards, protect against thieves, and to collect tithe payments and taxes during the harvest.

In 1249, Ottokar II of Bohemia granted the land of Mikulov (then called Nikolsburg) and the surrounding area to the Austrian noble Henry I of Liechtenstein. Afterward, more vineyards were planted in the Pálava Hills. In 1309, a new set of viticultural and winemaking regulations was established for many southern Moravian villages, based on the application of Bergrecht laws and vineyard rules of Falkenstein, Lower Austria in the district of Mikulov. For those villages under the jurisdiction of the Falkenstein Bergrecht, Falkenstein served as the Supreme Appeals Court in vineyard disputes. By 1368, Mikulov was one of the largest wine centres in Moravia. In 1414, a large number of the vineyards around Mikulov and Valtice were documented in the Liechtenstein Duties Register, later to become the oldest preserved register of the Liechtenstein vineyards.

The Thirty Years' War (1618–1648) destroyed a significant portion of the vineyards in Moravia, and over the next hundred years they were gradually replanted. In 1763, Austrian vintners asked Maria Theresa to limit new vineyard plantings in Moravia to reduce the competition from Moravian wines. In 1783, the local Bergrecht laws and the activities of the wine regulation court in Moravia were abolished by Joseph II, Holy Roman Emperor and replaced with a new set of vineyard regulations for Moravia.

Wine academies, dedicated to training capable enologists in the art and science of winemaking, were founded in Bzenec (1855), Znojmo (1868), Valtice (1873), Mělník (1882), Lednice (1895), Mikulov (1903) and Klobouky (1921).

The vine pest Phylloxera arrived in Šatov in 1890, Mikulov and Dolní Dunajovice in 1900, struck Perná in 1901, and hit Horní Věstonice and Bavory in 1902, devastating the vineyards throughout Moravia. Using Phylloxera-resistant rootstock, the vineyards were replanted with quality vines of single varietals.

The establishment of modern wine laws in the Czech Republic began in 1995 with the enactment of Wine Act No. 115/1995 on viticulture and winemaking practices into the Collection of Laws (Sb). The wine section of the European Union regulations was translated into Czech and subsequently incorporated into the Wine Act. The original draft of the Amendment to the Wine Act also contained provisions for establishing the Czech Wine Fund through Act No. 50/2002 Sb. After the Czech Republic joined the European Union in 2004, the Wine Act No. 321/2004 Sb on viticulture and winemaking practices was adopted, bringing Czech wine legislation into conformity with EU standards.

== Regions ==
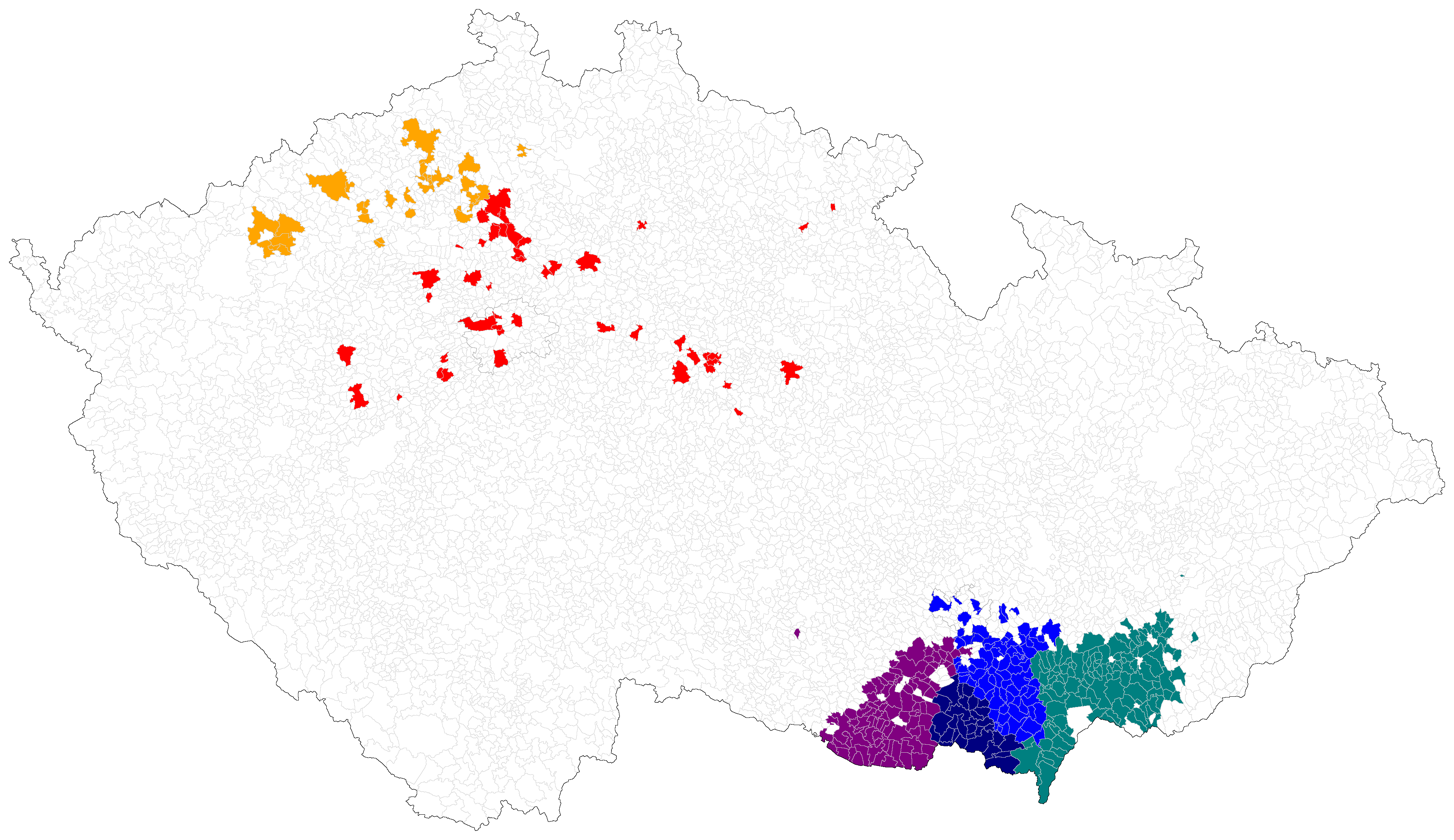
Czech wine regions

Czech wine law (2004) defines two wine-growing regions (Czech: Vinařská oblast). These are Moravia (Vinařská oblast Morava) and Bohemia (Vinařská oblast Čechy).

=== Moravia ===
Wine production in the Czech Republic centers on southern Moravia, particularly around the river Dyje. Four wine growing sub-regions (Czech: Vinařská podoblast) are located here, each named after a major town or region. These sub-regions are:

Wine sub-region	Origin of the name
Mikulovská	Town of Mikulov
Znojemská	Town of Znojmo
Velkopavlovická	Town of Velké Pavlovice
Slovácká	Moravian Slovakia region

Wine production intertwined with the local culture made Moravia a key wine tourism destination in Czech Republic. Established in 1999, Moravian Wine Trail is a unique project designed to protect cultural heritage and encourage further development of wine tourism in the region. The trail covers almost 300 towns and villages in the Moravian region inter-connected by a network of cycling routes.

The Czech National Wine Centre and Wine Salon of the Czech Republic in Valtice Castle are located in Moravian wine country.

=== Bohemia ===
Bohemia is home to a relatively tiny collection of vineyards that are among the most northerly in Europe. They are situated around 50° north latitude, the same as Wiesbaden in the Rheingau. Two defined wine-growing subregions are located in Bohemia:

Wine Subregion (Vinařská podoblast)	Origin of Name
Mělnická	Town of Mělník
Litoměřická	Town of Litoměřice

Small vineyards can be found in Prague, but they do not produce a significant amount of wine. The top five grape varieties grown in Bohemia are Müller-Thurgau (26% of vineyards), Riesling (16% of vineyards), St. Laurent (14% of vineyards), Blauer Portugieser (10% of vineyards), and Pinot noir (8% of vineyards).

=== Largest wine municipalities ===
As of 2018, the following wine municipalities were the largest:

Wine village	Vineyard area (ha)	Number of producers	Subregion
Velké Bílovice	766	956	Velkopavlovická
Valtice	578	197	Mikulovská
Mikulov	516	299	Mikulovská
Čejkovice	515	656	Velkopavlovická
Dolní Dunajovice	457	357	Mikulovská
Novosedly	421	86	Mikulovská
Velké Pavlovice	378	596	Velkopavlovická
Vrbovec	344	71	Znojemská
Kobylí	301	505	Velkopavlovická
Mutěnice	283	919	Slovácká

== Grape varieties ==
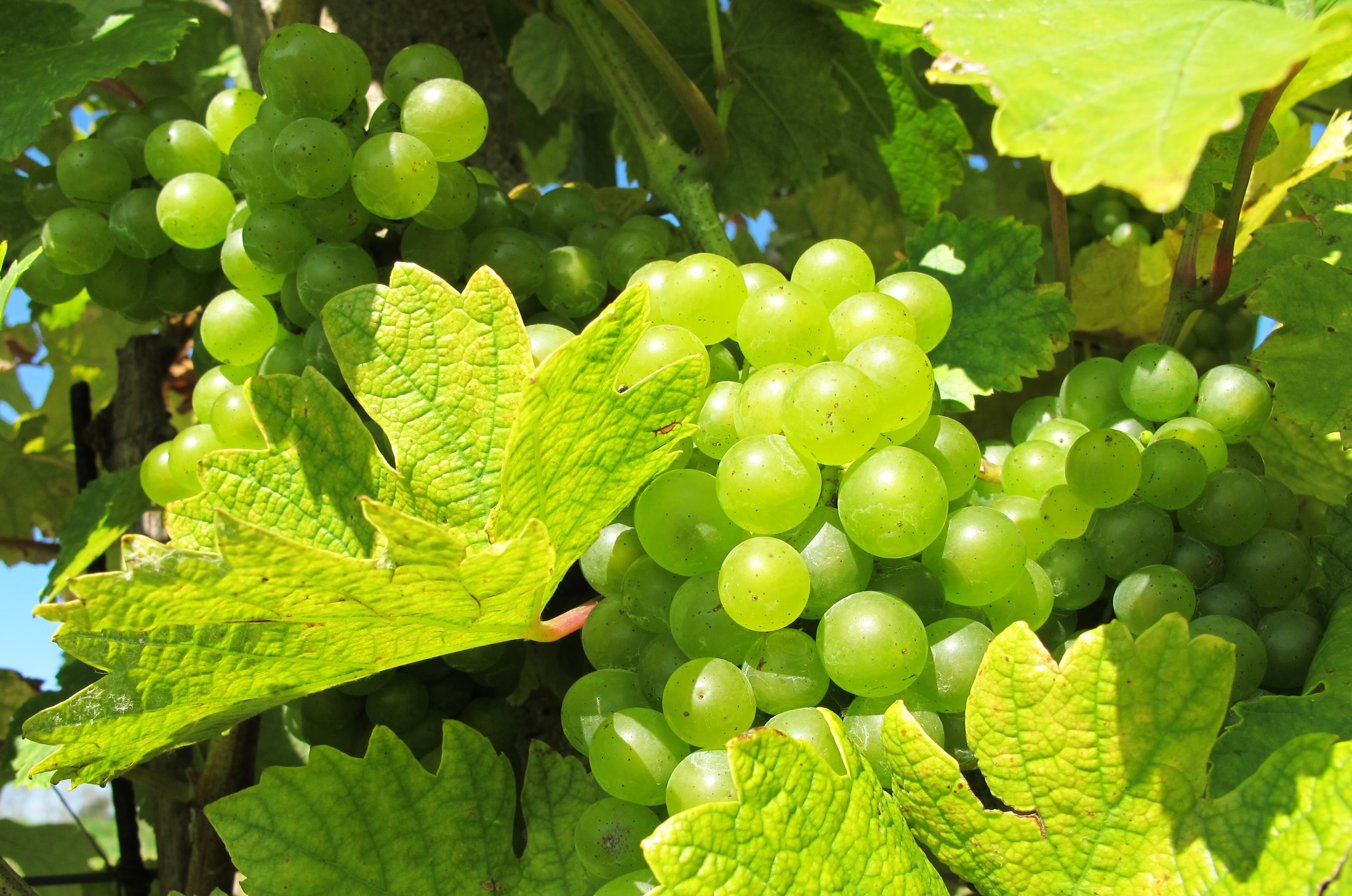

The most commonly grown grape varieties in the Czech Republic, including the approximate percentage of wine produced for each variety, are listed below:

White Grape Varieties
Czech Name	International Name	Percentage of Wine Produced
Rulandské šedé	Pinot gris	10.63%
Ryzlink rýnský	Riesling	9.45%
Chardonnay	Chardonnay	9.16%
Sauvignon blanc	Sauvignon blanc	8.65%
Tramín červený	Gewürztraminer	7.79%
Pálava	Pálava	7.75%
Veltlínské zelené	Grüner Veltliner	7.53%
Ryzlink vlašský	Welschriesling	7.39%
Rulandské bílé	Pinot blanc	5.35%
Hibernal	Hibernal	4.20%
Müller-Thurgau	Müller-Thurgau	3.96%
Muškát moravský	Moravian Muscat	2.86%
Sylvánské zelené	Silvaner	2.20%
Neuburské	Neuburger	1.94%
Aurelius	Aurelius	1.04%
Solaris	Solaris	1.02%
Irsai Oliver	Irsai Oliver	0.75%
Kerner	Kerner	0.75%
Děvín	Děvín	0.57%
Other white grape varieties	(Note: these include Roter Veltliner, Muscat Ottonel, Johanniter and Souvignier gris)	7.00%

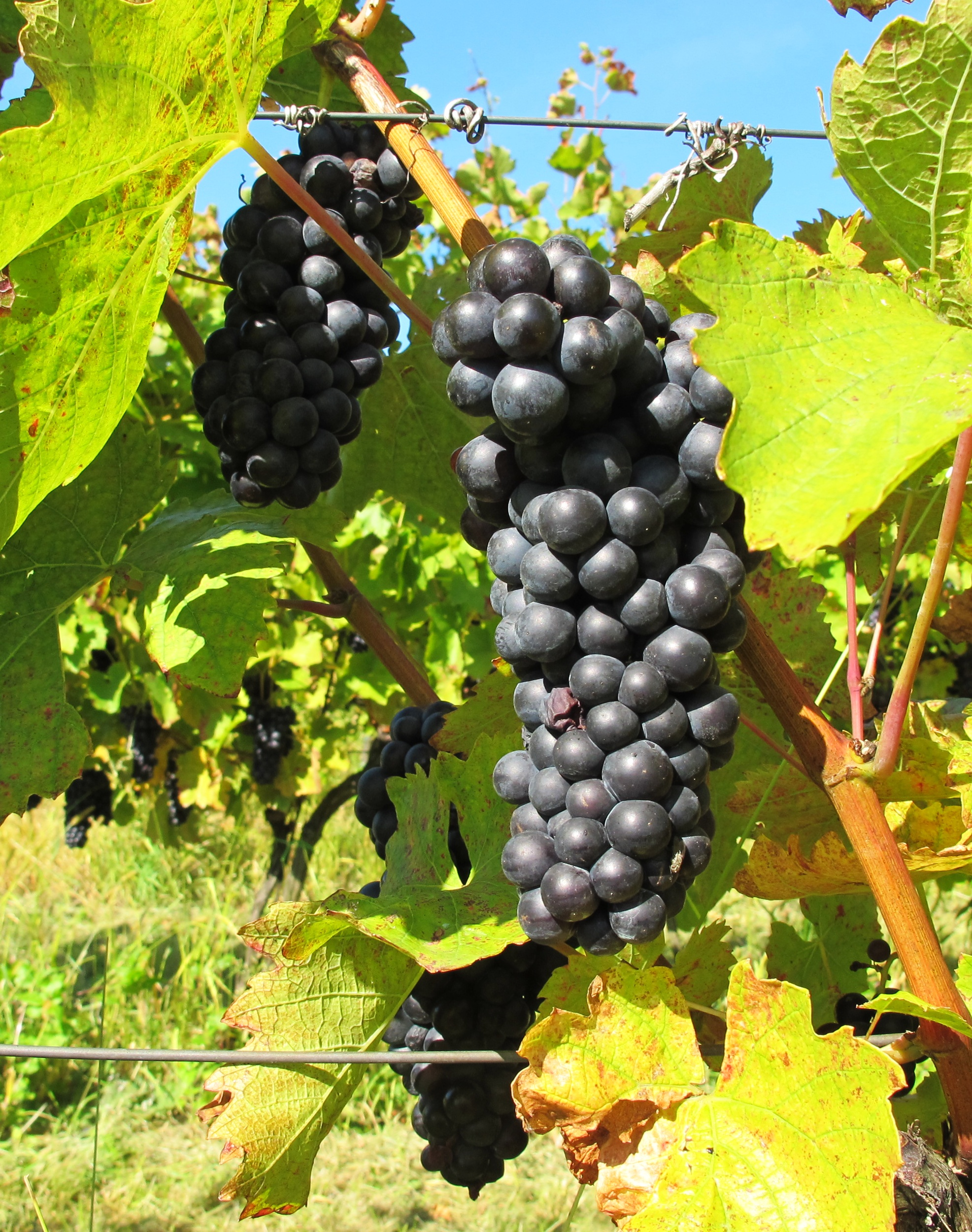

Black Grape Varieties
Czech Name	International Name	Percentage of Wine Produced
Rulandské modré	Pinot noir	17.39%
Frankovka	Blaufränkisch	16.95%
Zweigeltrebe	Zweigelt	12.25%
Svatovavřinecké	Saint Laurent	8.84%
Cabernet Sauvignon	Cabernet Sauvignon	7.44%
Modrý Portugal	Blauer Portugieser	5.76%
Merlot	Merlot	5.65%
Dornfelder	Dornfelder	5.26%
Cabernet Moravia	Cabernet Moravia	5.09%
André	André	3.41%
Neronet	Neronet	1.62%
Alibernet	Alibernet	1.17%
Other black grape varieties	(Note: these include Cabernet Cortis, Blauburger, Regent, Fratava, Agni, Laurot, Roesler, Sevar, Ariana, Rubinet, Dunaj and Acolon)	8.61%

== Wine festivals ==
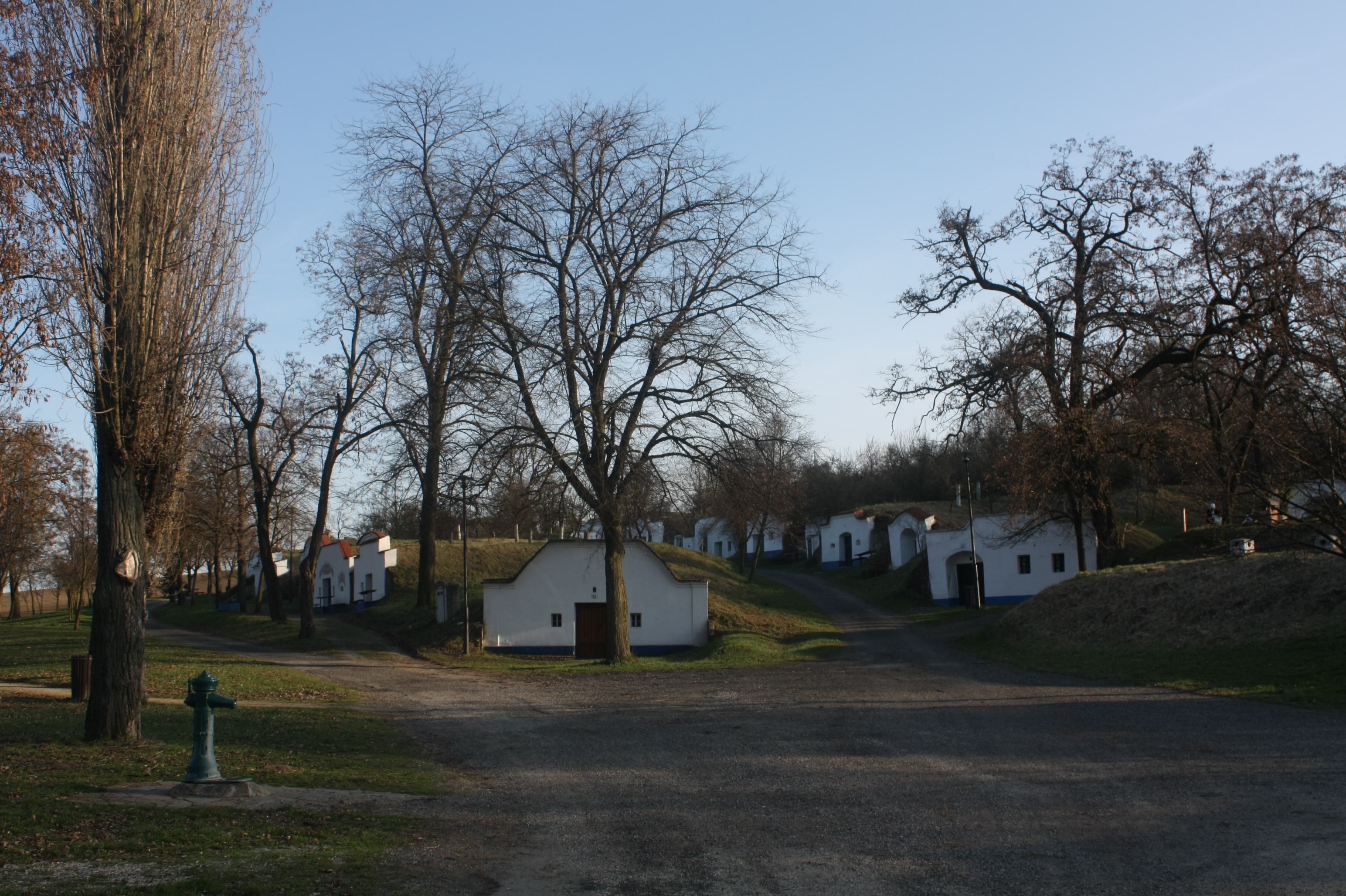
Traditional wine cellars in Petrov, near Strážnice, Southern Moravia

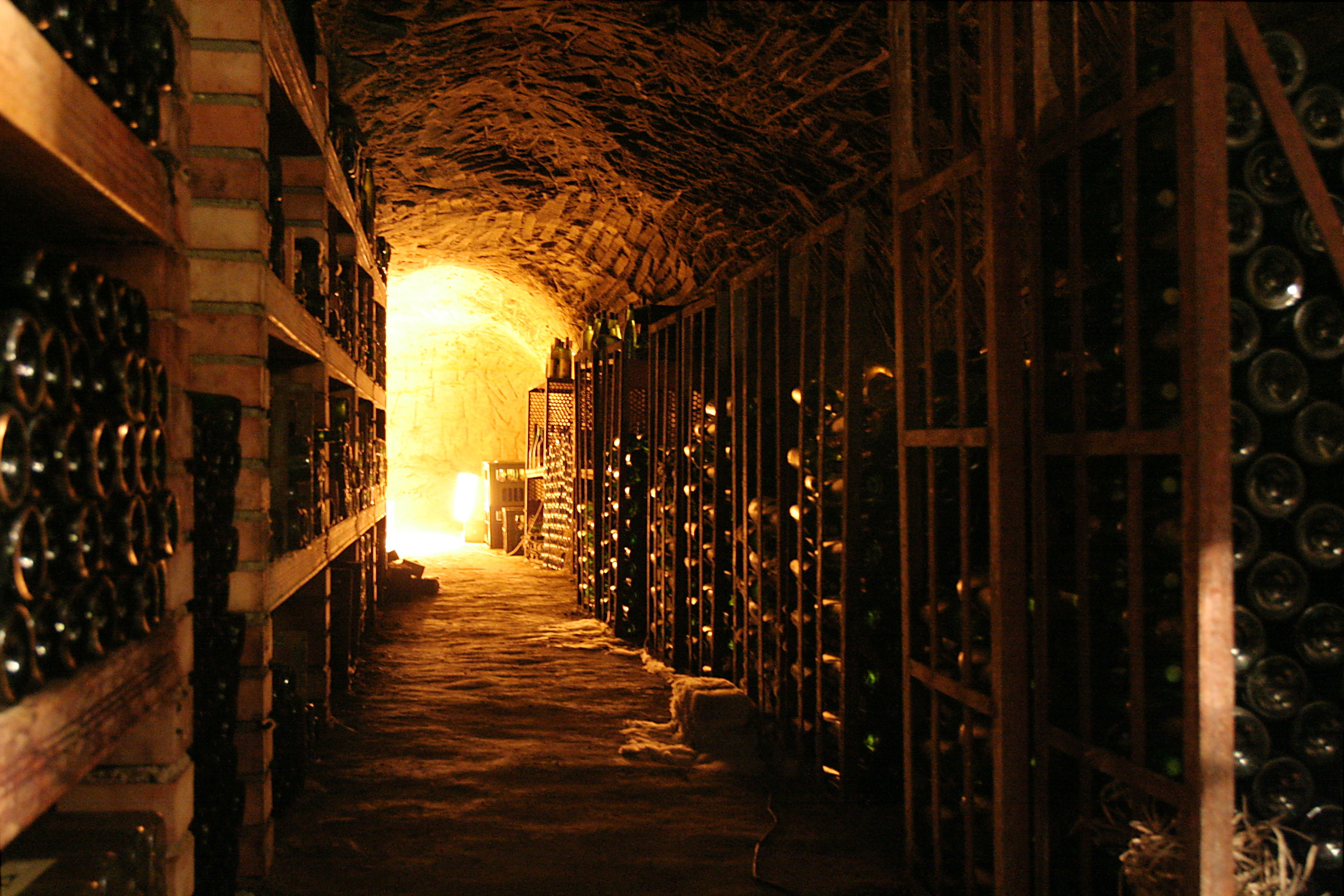
Wine cellar in Chvalovice, near Znojmo

The wine-producing areas of the Czech Republic are well known for their wine festivals (Czech: vinobraní) which take place around harvest time in September. The biggest of these festivals in Znojmo, Mikulov, Brno and Mělník will feature samples of hundreds of local wines as well as local music, dancing and cuisine. These wine-festivals take place in big towns apart from the wine-producing areas as well (such as Prague).

== Classification ==
Two bottles of Moravian wine (an Irsai Oliver and a Cabernet Moravia), showing the usual labeling for geographical origin

Czech wine law classifies wine according to the origin of the grapes and the ripeness of the grapes determined by measuring the must weight in the grape juice at the time of harvest. Sugar content is expressed in units of °NM on the Czecho-Slovak Normalised Must-Weight Scale (Czech: Normalizovaný moštoměr), which indicates how many kilograms of sugar are contained in one hundred litres of grape juice. One degree on the NM scale is equivalent to one kilogram of natural sugar in 100 litres of grape must. Czech wine is typically labeled with its variety, detailed description of its origin, and wine quality attributes. In general, wine produced from grapes with a higher must-weight level and from a single vineyard is considered higher quality.

=== Origin specification ===
A Czech wine label will typically specify the wine's origin with one or more of the following terms:

- Vinařská oblast – (Region) e.g. Morava (Moravia)
- Vinařská podoblast – (Subregion) e.g. Velkopavlovická (Velké Pavlovice)
- Vinařská obec – (Municipality)
- Trať – (Vineyard)

=== Composition and Quality Attributes ===
A Czech wine label must contain one of the following terms that designates its classification:

1. Jakostní víno s přívlastkem (Quality Wine with Special Attributes)

Wine must originate from a single wine sub-region and the grape varieties, their origin, must-weight levels, and weight must be verified by the Czech State Agricultural & Food Inspectorate (SZPI). Chaptalisation is not permitted.

Jakostní víno s přívlastkem (Quality Wine with Special Attributes)
Classification	Translation	Description
Kabinetní víno	Kabinet	Wine made from grapes whose must-weight levels have reached no less than 19 °NM.
Pozdní sběr	Late Harvest	Wine made from grapes whose must-weight levels have reached no less than 21 °NM.
Výběr z hroznů	Special Selection of Grapes	Wine made from grape bunches ripened very long on the vine whose must-weight levels have reached no less than 24 °NM.
Výběr z bobulí	Special Selection of Berries	Wine made from selected berries that have ripened very long on the vine whose must-weight levels have reached at least 27 °NM.
Výběr z cibéb	Special Selection of Botrytis-affected Berries	Wine made from selected berries affected by noble rot whose must-weight levels have reached at least 32 °NM.
Ledové víno	Ice wine	Wine made from grapes frozen on the vine. The grapes are pressed frozen at a temperature not greater than -7 °C and with a must-weight level of at least 27 °NM.
Slámové víno	Straw wine	Wine made from grapes dried for no less than three months after harvest on straw or reed beds, or suspended in a well-ventilated area. The must-weight of the grape juice at the time of pressing can be no less than 27 °NM.

2. Jakostní víno (Quality wine)

Wine produced from grapes grown in the Czech Republic within a single wine region. Yields must not exceed 12 tons/hectare and must-weight levels must be no less than 15 °NM.
Jakostní víno odrůdové (Quality Varietal Wine)

Wine made from at most three grape varieties

Jakostní víno známkové (Quality Brand Wine)

Wine that is a blend (cuveé) of at least two grape varieties

3. Moravské zemské víno or České zemské víno (Country wine)

Wine produced from grapes originating from the Czech Republic, must-weight levels must be no less than 14 °NM.

4. Stolní víno (Table wine)

Wine produced from grapes originating from any country in the EU. This is the lowest wine category.

=== Appellation (VOC) ===
In the late 2000s, in parallel with the origin and the composition and quality attributes, system the appellation-based system was introduced - vína originální cetrifikace (VOC, wines of original certification). Following VOCs are certified as of 2019:

Name	Location	Founded	Producers	Subregion
VOC Znojmo	Znojmo	2009	20	Znojemská
VOC Mikulov	Mikulov	2011	12	Mikulovská
VOC Modré Hory	Němčičky	2011	19	Velkopavlovická
VOC Pálava	Perná	2012	7	Mikulovská
VOC Blatnice	Blatnice	2013	31	Slovácká
VOC Valtice	Valtice	2015	6	Mikulovská
VOC Mělník	Mělník	2015	4	Mělnická
VOC Slovácko	Josefov	2016	7	Slovácká
VOC Hustopečsko	Hustopeče	2016	4	Velkopavlovická
VOC Kraví Hora	Bořetice	2017	5	Velkopavlovická
VOC Bzenec	Bzenec	2017	3	Slovácká
VOC Mutěnice	Mutěnice	2018	3	Slovácká
VOC Velké Pavlovice	Velké Pavlovice	2019	7	Velkopavlovická

== See also ==
- Winemaking
- Czech cuisine
