= Karl Beck =

Karl or Carl Beck may refer to:

- Charles Beck (1798–1866), German-born American classical scholar
- Karl Beck (footballer) (1888–1972), Austrian footballer
- Karl Beck (tenor) (1814–1879), Austrian operatic tenor
- Karl Beck (soldier) (1911–1945), Oberst in the Wehrmacht during World War II
- Karl Isidor Beck (1817–1879), Austrian poet
- Carl Beck (1897–1963), American football player
