= Aurelius (grape) =

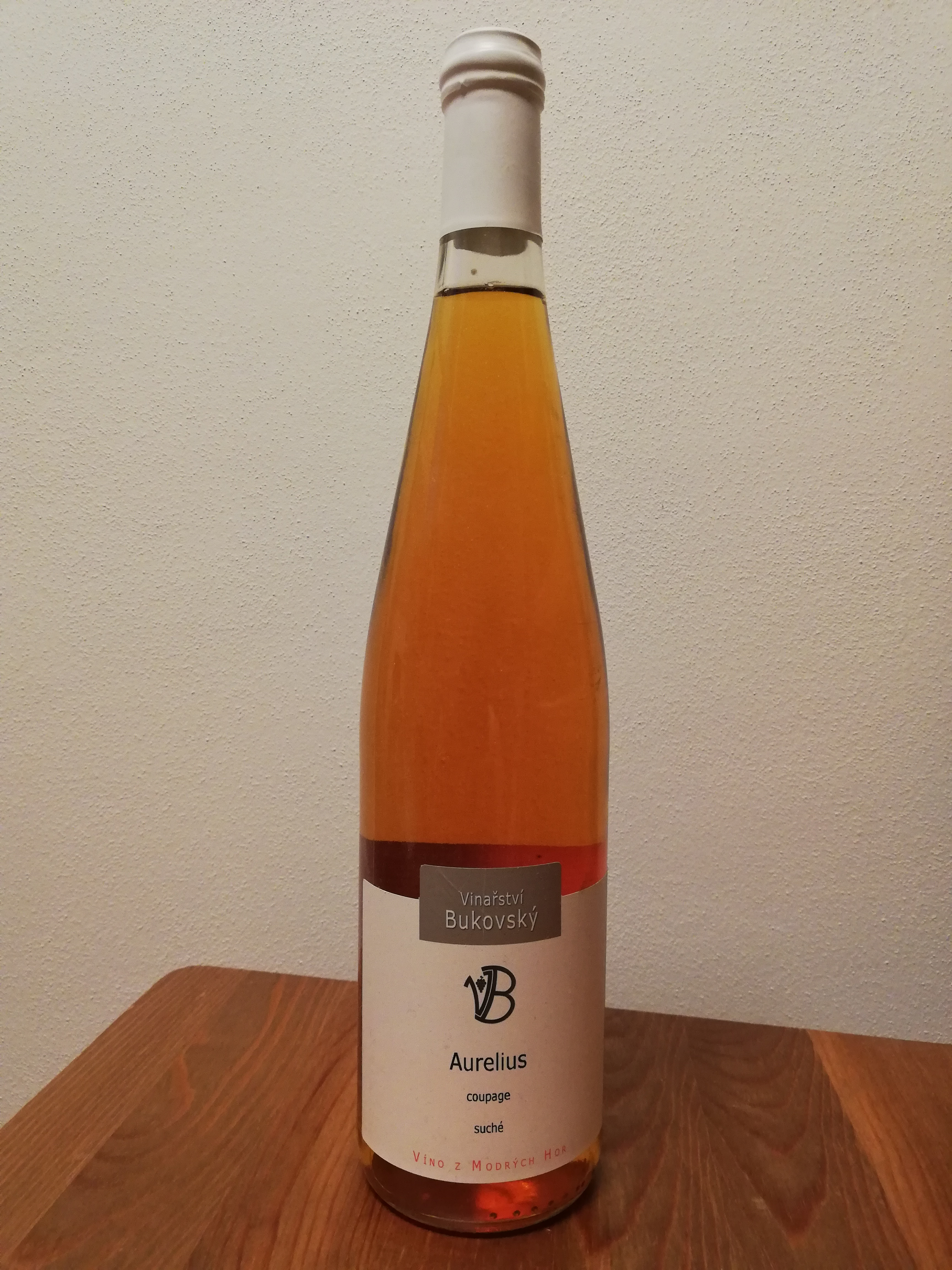
Bottle of Aurelius wine

Aurelius is a variety of white wine grape developed in 1983 by Josef Veverka in Moravia. The variety is a genetic crossbreed of the Neuburger and Riesling grape varieties. Aurelius wines are usually aromatic, with mild acidity fruity tones.

The variety has not spread far beyond its homeland, outside of the Czech Republic is planted in Slovakia and Hungary (in small quantities). In the Czech Republic, it is planted mostly in the Mikulov region.

The variety is named after Marcus Aurelius Probus (232–282), Roman emperor, who presumebaly brought winemaking in to the Moravian region (this thesis is usually doubted by historians though).

== See also ==
- Czech wine
- List of grape varieties
- Pálava (grape)
