= Mutěnice (Hodonín District) =

- Municipality
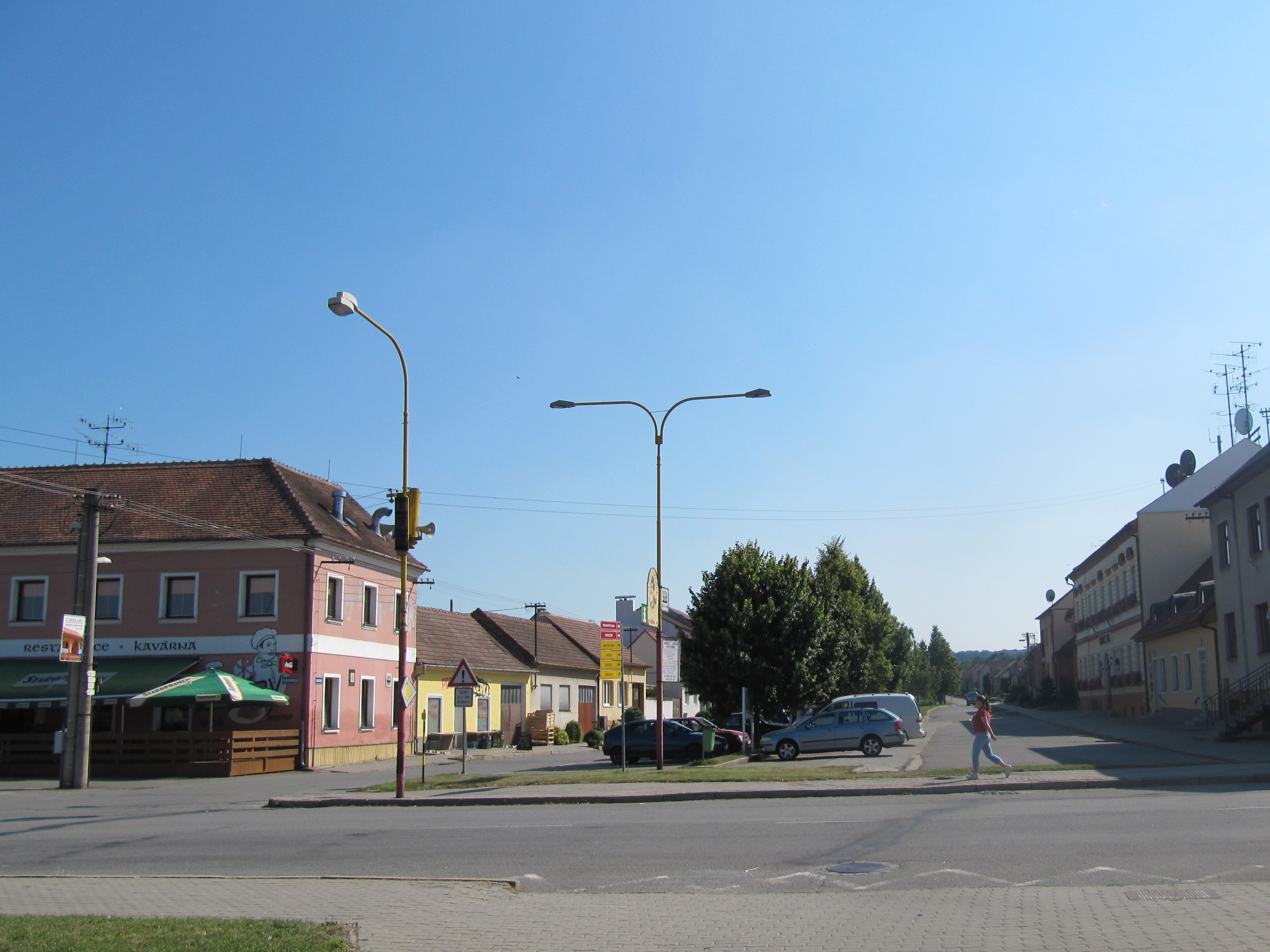
- Centre of Mutěnice

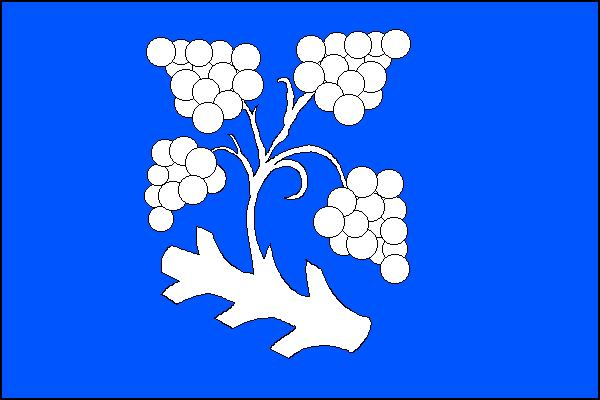
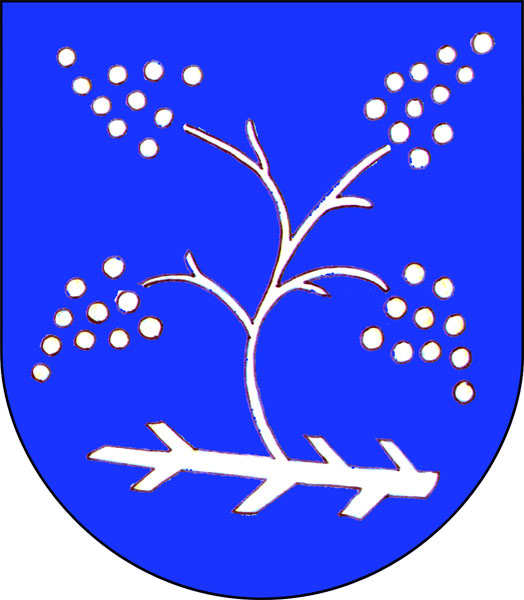
- Flag Coat of arms

- Location in the Czech Republic
- Coordinates: 48°54′14″N 17°1′44″E
- Country: Czech Republic
- Region: South Moravian
- District: Hodonín
- First mentioned: 1367

Area
  - Total: 32.36 km^{2} (12.49 sq mi)
- Elevation: 183 m (600 ft)

Population (2026-01-01)
  - Total: 3,735
  - Density: 115.4/km^{2} (298.9/sq mi)
- Time zone: UTC+1 (CET)
  - Summer (DST): UTC+2 (CEST)
- Postal code: 696 11
- Website: mutenice.cz

Mutěnice (Czech pronunciation: [ˈmucɛɲɪtsɛ]) is a municipality and village in Hodonín District in the South Moravian Region of the Czech Republic. It has about 3,700 inhabitants. The municipality is located on the Kyjovka River, on the border between the Kyjov Hills and Lower Morava Valley. Mutěnice is known for viticulture and winemaking.

== Geography ==
Mutěnice is located about 8 kilometres (5 mi) northwest of Hodonín and 43 km (27 mi) southeast of Brno. It lies mostly in the Kyjov Hills, only the eastern part of the municipal territory lies in the Lower Morava Valley. The highest point is the hill Vyšicko at 267 m (876 ft) above sea level. The Kyjovka River flows through the eastern part of the municipality and supplies there a system of fishponds.

== History ==
The village of Mutěnice was probably founded by external colonisation of the area by the Knights Templar, who owned the area in the 13th century. From 1312, the area of Mutěnice and neighbouring Čejkovice belonged to the Knights Hospitaller. The order built a commandery in the area, first mentioned in 1349. The first written mention of Mutěnice is from 1367.

Between 1537 and 1594, Mutěnice was owned by the Lords of Lipá. From that time is documented existence of a fortress here. The Lords of Lipá sold it to the Salm family, who soon sold it and the village further often changed owners. Between 1565 and 1605, a community of Anabatists settled here. The village was devastated by the Thirty Years' War. The population declined from 650 inhabitants in 94 houses in 1618 to 150 in 24 habitable dwellings by 1648. The village lost its own school and a parish, which was not reestablished until 1718. The schoolhouse was not rebuild until 1698 (demolished in 2007). The village experienced a major development in the late 19th century with the construction of the neorenaissance schoolhouse in 1873 (demolished in 2010), townhall in 1896 and a trainstation in 1897.

The 1910s to 1930s brought in modern innovation in winemaking with the establishment of a former Mutěnice winegrowing research station and founding of many winemaker´s associations, clubs and cooperatives. The village also has a few notable early modernist buildings, mainly functionalist Municipal house from 1938 and the new school building from 1947–1950 designed by Bohuslav Fuchs

== Demographics ==
Historical population

| Year | Pop. | ±% |
|---|---|---|
| 1869 | 1,883 | — |
| 1880 | 2,072 | +10.0% |
| 1890 | 2,151 | +3.8% |
| 1900 | 2,316 | +7.7% |
| 1910 | 2,482 | +7.2% |

| Year | Pop. | ±% |
|---|---|---|
| 1921 | 2,702 | +8.9% |
| 1930 | 2,747 | +1.7% |
| 1950 | 3,156 | +14.9% |
| 1961 | 3,644 | +15.5% |
| 1970 | 3,615 | −0.8% |

| Year | Pop. | ±% |
|---|---|---|
| 1980 | 3,547 | −1.9% |
| 1991 | 3,499 | −1.4% |
| 2001 | 3,669 | +4.9% |
| 2011 | 3,582 | −2.4% |
| 2021 | 3,529 | −1.5% |

Source: Censuses

== Economy ==
Mutěnice is known for viticulture and winemaking. The municipality is the largest in the Slovácká wine subregion.

== Transport ==
The village of Mutěnice was connected to the railway line Hodonín–Zaječí in 1897 and to the now discontinued line of Mutěnice–Kyjov in 1900. Trains run only on weekends.

== Sights ==
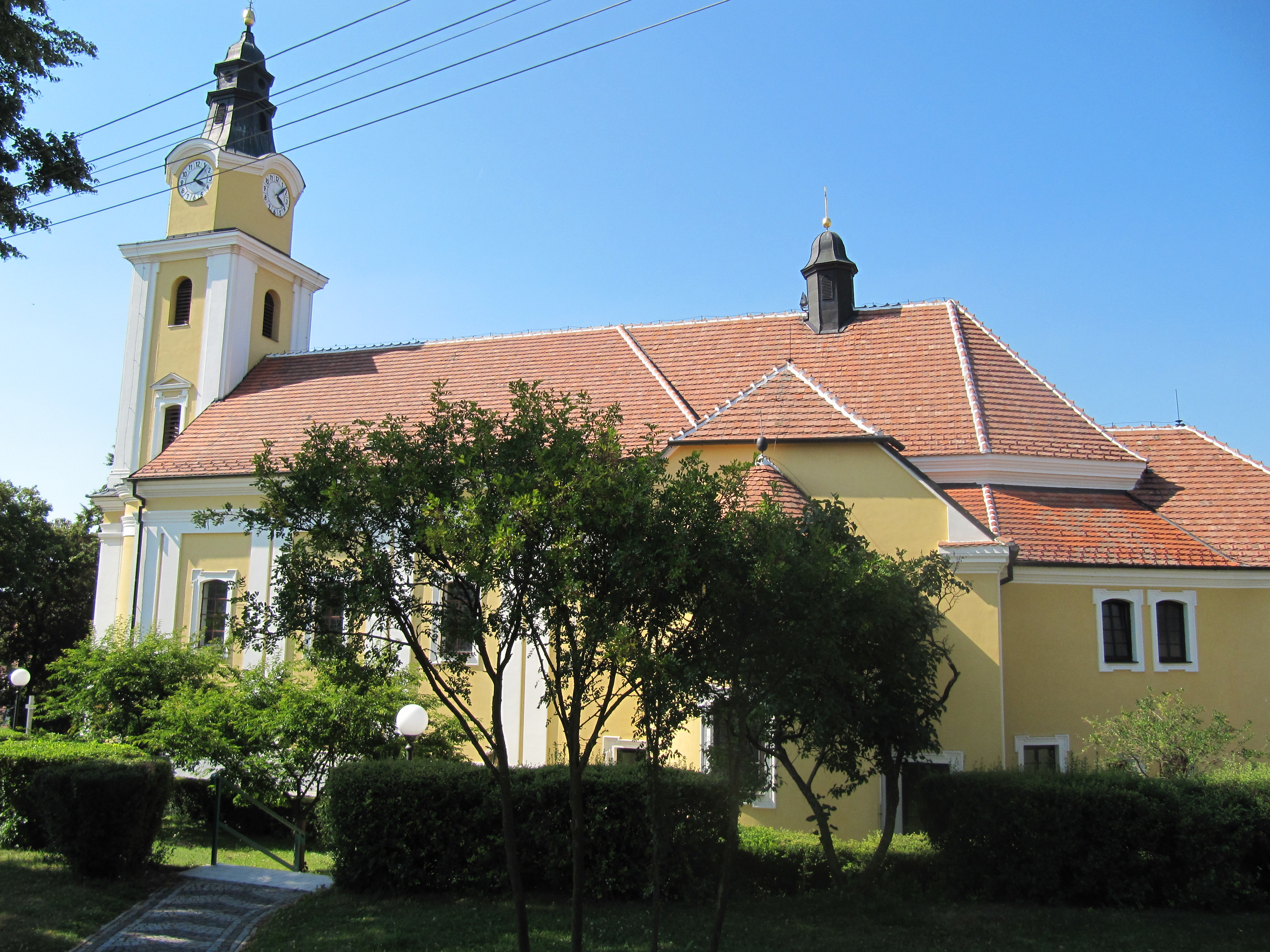
Church of Saint Catherine

The most significant monument is the Church of Saint Catherine. It was built in the Baroque style in 1769–1775 by order of Empress Maria Theresa on the site of a former desolated chapel. The current appearance of the church is after major rebuild in 1950

Mutěnice is known for búdy, which are above-ground wine cellars and presses of folk architecture. There are about 550 of these buildings. The oldest are from the early 18th century.

The neo-Renaissance townhall built in 1896.

== Notable people ==
- Tomáš Garrigue Masaryk (1850–1937), politician, Czechoslovak president; lived here in 1852–1853
- Šimon Drgáč (1892–1980), army general, Czechoslovak Chief of the General Staff in 1948–1950, Czechoslovak military attaché in Paris in 1929–1931, political prisoner between 1939–1945 and between 1951–1958
