= Stošíkovice na Louce =

- Municipality
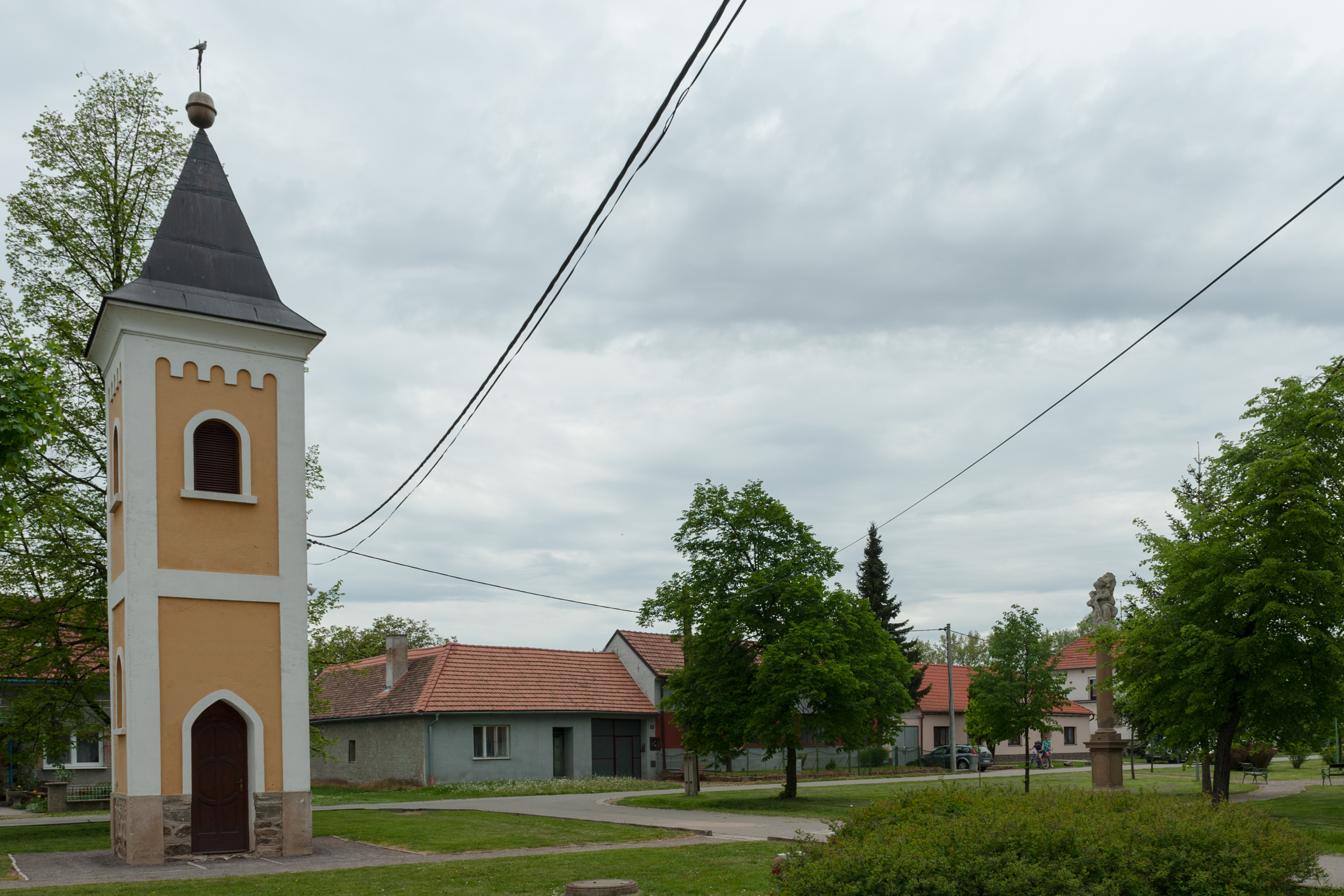
- Bell tower

- Flag Coat of arms

- Location in the Czech Republic
- Coordinates: 48°53′48″N 16°12′54″E
- Country: Czech Republic
- Region: South Moravian
- District: Znojmo
- First mentioned: 1360

Area
  - Total: 6.17 km^{2} (2.38 sq mi)
- Elevation: 197 m (646 ft)

Population (2026-01-01)
  - Total: 331
  - Density: 53.6/km^{2} (139/sq mi)
- Time zone: UTC+1 (CET)
  - Summer (DST): UTC+2 (CEST)
- Postal code: 671 61
- Website: www.stosikovice.cz

Stošíkovice na Louce is a municipality and village in Znojmo District in the South Moravian Region of the Czech Republic. It has about 300 inhabitants.

Stošíkovice na Louce lies approximately 15 kilometres (9 mi) east of Znojmo, 45 km (28 mi) south-west of Brno, and 186 km (116 mi) south-east of Prague.

== Demographics ==
Historical population
Year	Pop.	±%
1869	327	—
1880	361	+10.4%
1890	353	−2.2%
1900	336	−4.8%
1910	385	+14.6%
1921	407	+5.7%
1930	392	−3.7%
1950	336	−14.3%
1961	280	−16.7%
1970	263	−6.1%
1980	225	−14.4%
1991	207	−8.0%
2001	203	−1.9%
2011	227	+11.8%
2021	302	+33.0%
Source: Censuses

== Economy ==
Stošíkovice na Louce is known for viticulture and winemaking. It lies in the Znojemská wine subregion.
