= Perná =

- Municipality
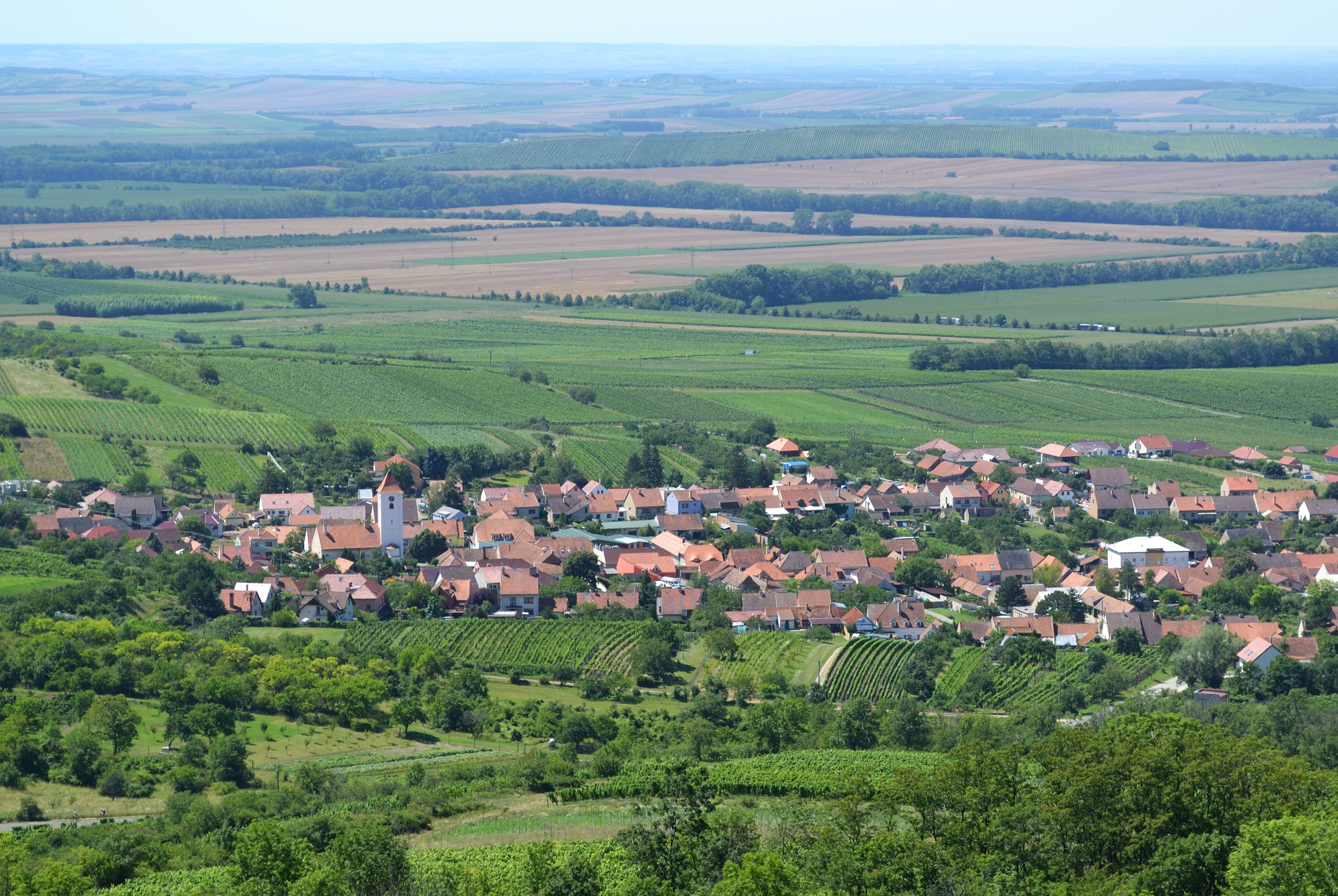
- View from the northeast

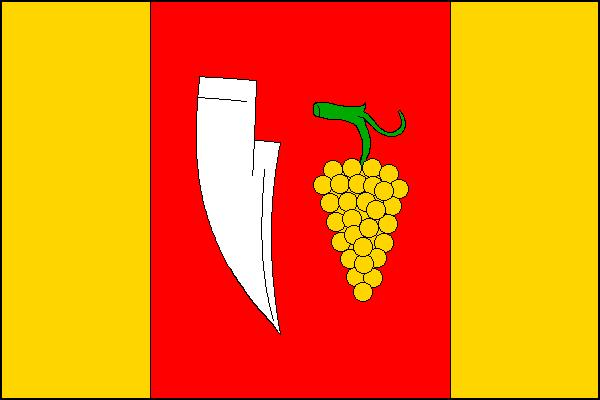
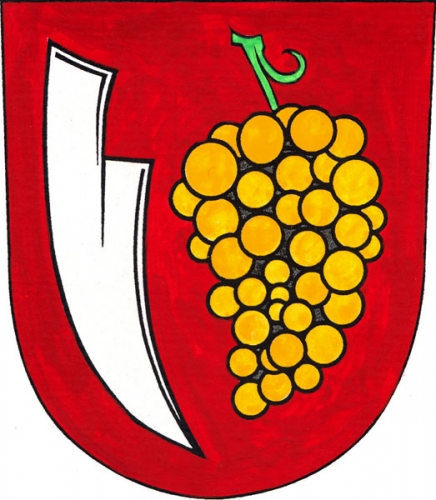
- Flag Coat of arms

- Location in the Czech Republic
- Coordinates: 48°51′8″N 16°37′28″E
- Country: Czech Republic
- Region: South Moravian
- District: Břeclav
- First mentioned: 1305

Area
  - Total: 9.33 km^{2} (3.60 sq mi)
- Elevation: 228 m (748 ft)

Population (2026-01-01)
  - Total: 795
  - Density: 85.2/km^{2} (221/sq mi)
- Time zone: UTC+1 (CET)
  - Summer (DST): UTC+2 (CEST)
- Postal code: 691 86
- Website: www.obec-perna.cz

Perná is a municipality and village in Břeclav District in the South Moravian Region of the Czech Republic. It has about 800 inhabitants.

== Geography ==
Perná is located about 22 kilometres (14 mi) northwest of Břeclav and 37 km (23 mi) south of Brno. It lies on the border between the Mikulov Highlands and Dyje–Svratka Valley. The highest point is the hill Obora at 483 m (1,585 ft) above sea level. Perná is located within the Pálava Protected Landscape Area.

== History ==
The first written mention of Perná is in a donation deed of King Wenceslaus III from 1305. The village was founded on an important trade route. During the rule of King John of Bohemia (1310–1346), Perná became part of the Mikulov estate.

Until World War II, the majority of the population were ethnic Germans. After the war, the German-speaking population was expelled and the municipality was repopulated by Czechs.

== Demographics ==
Historical population

Year	Pop.	±%
1869	884	—
1880	893	+1.0%
1890	914	+2.4%
1900	1,022	+11.8%
1910	1,038	+1.6%

Year	Pop.	±%
1921	946	−8.9%
1930	1,031	+9.0%
1950	776	−24.7%
1961	793	+2.2%
1970	739	−6.8%

Year	Pop.	±%
1980	669	−9.5%
1991	756	+13.0%
2001	756	+0.0%
2011	748	−1.1%
2021	772	+3.2%

Source: Censuses

== Economy ==
Perná is known for viticulture and winemaking. The municipality lies in the Mikulovská wine subregion. This tradition dates back to the 14th century. There are about 200 hectares (490 acres) of vineyards. In 1946, a viticultural breeding station was established in the municipality, which gradually became an important centre for vineyard research. Its first major nationwide success was the development of the Pálava grape variety in 1979, followed by the recognition of the Aurelius variety in 1983.

== Transport ==
The I/52 road (continuation of the D52 motorway from Brno to Mikulov, part of the European route E461) runs through the western part of the municipality.

== Sights ==
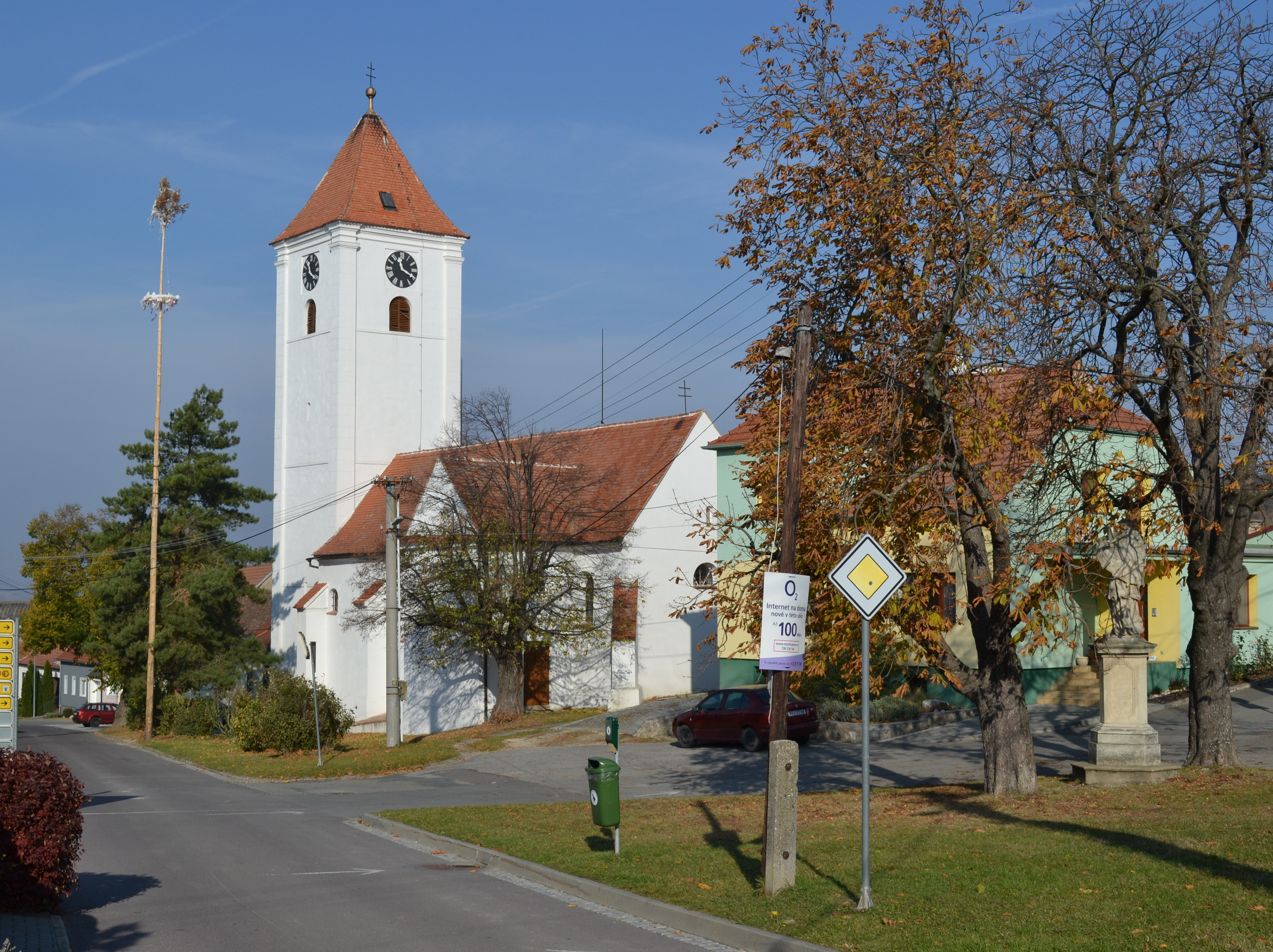
Church of Saint Nicholas

The main landmark of Perná is the Church of Saint Nicholas. It was built in 1510–1583, however, it has a medieval core from the Chapel of Saint Nicholas that stood in its place. At the turn of the 17th and 18th centuries, it was rebuilt to its present form. Inside there is a stone baptismal font from the first half of the 15th century.

A cultural monuments is the stone fountain in the centre of Perná. It dates from 1902.
