= Litoměřická wine =

The Litoměřická wine subregion (Czech: Litoměřická oblast) is one of six wine subregions in the Czech Republic. It is situated on the Elbe river, with its centre in the town of Litoměřice. This area contains 29 official wine municipalities. The history of winery in this north Bohemian region is longer than 1,000 years.
