= Josefov (Hodonín District) =

- Municipality
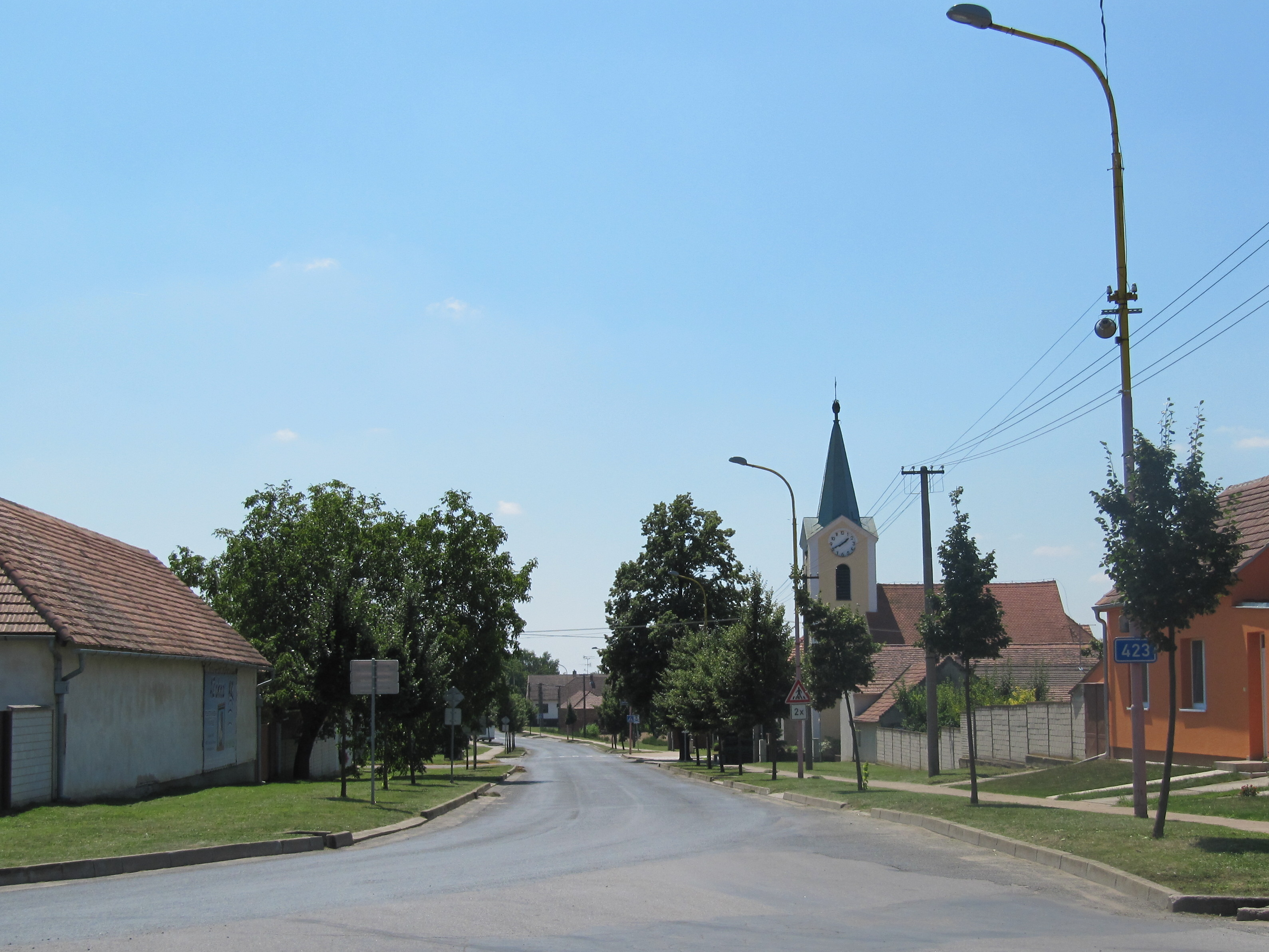
- Main street with the Church of All Saints

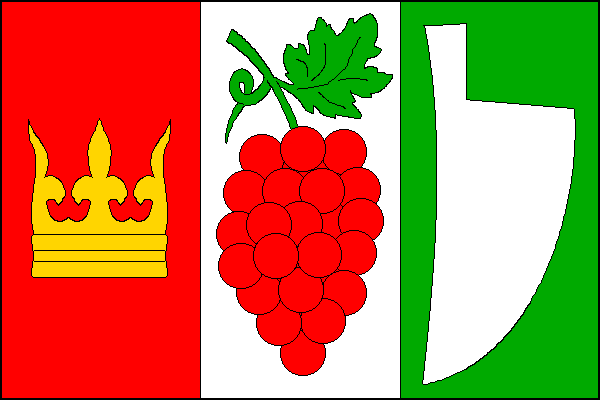
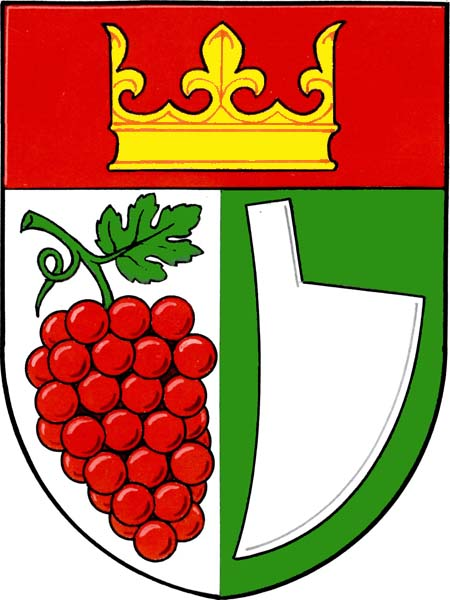
- Flag Coat of arms

- Location in the Czech Republic
- Coordinates: 48°50′22″N 17°0′36″E
- Country: Czech Republic
- Region: South Moravian
- District: Hodonín
- Founded: 1782

Area
  - Total: 7.08 km^{2} (2.73 sq mi)
- Elevation: 186 m (610 ft)

Population (2026-01-01)
  - Total: 453
  - Density: 64.0/km^{2} (166/sq mi)
- Time zone: UTC+1 (CET)
  - Summer (DST): UTC+2 (CEST)
- Postal code: 696 21
- Website: www.josefov.eu

Josefov (German: Josefsdorf) is a municipality and village in Hodonín District in the South Moravian Region of the Czech Republic. It has about 500 inhabitants.

Josefov lies approximately 10 kilometres (6 mi) west of Hodonín, 50 km (31 mi) south-east of Brno, and 233 km (145 mi) south-east of Prague.

== Demographics ==
Historical population
Year	Pop.	±%
1869	203	—
1880	249	+22.7%
1890	212	−14.9%
1900	243	+14.6%
1910	284	+16.9%
1921	284	+0.0%
1930	282	−0.7%
1950	293	+3.9%
1961	307	+4.8%
1970	310	+1.0%
1980	346	+11.6%
1991	344	−0.6%
2001	376	+9.3%
2011	393	+4.5%
2021	429	+9.2%
Source: Censuses
