= Vrbovec (Znojmo District) =

- Municipality
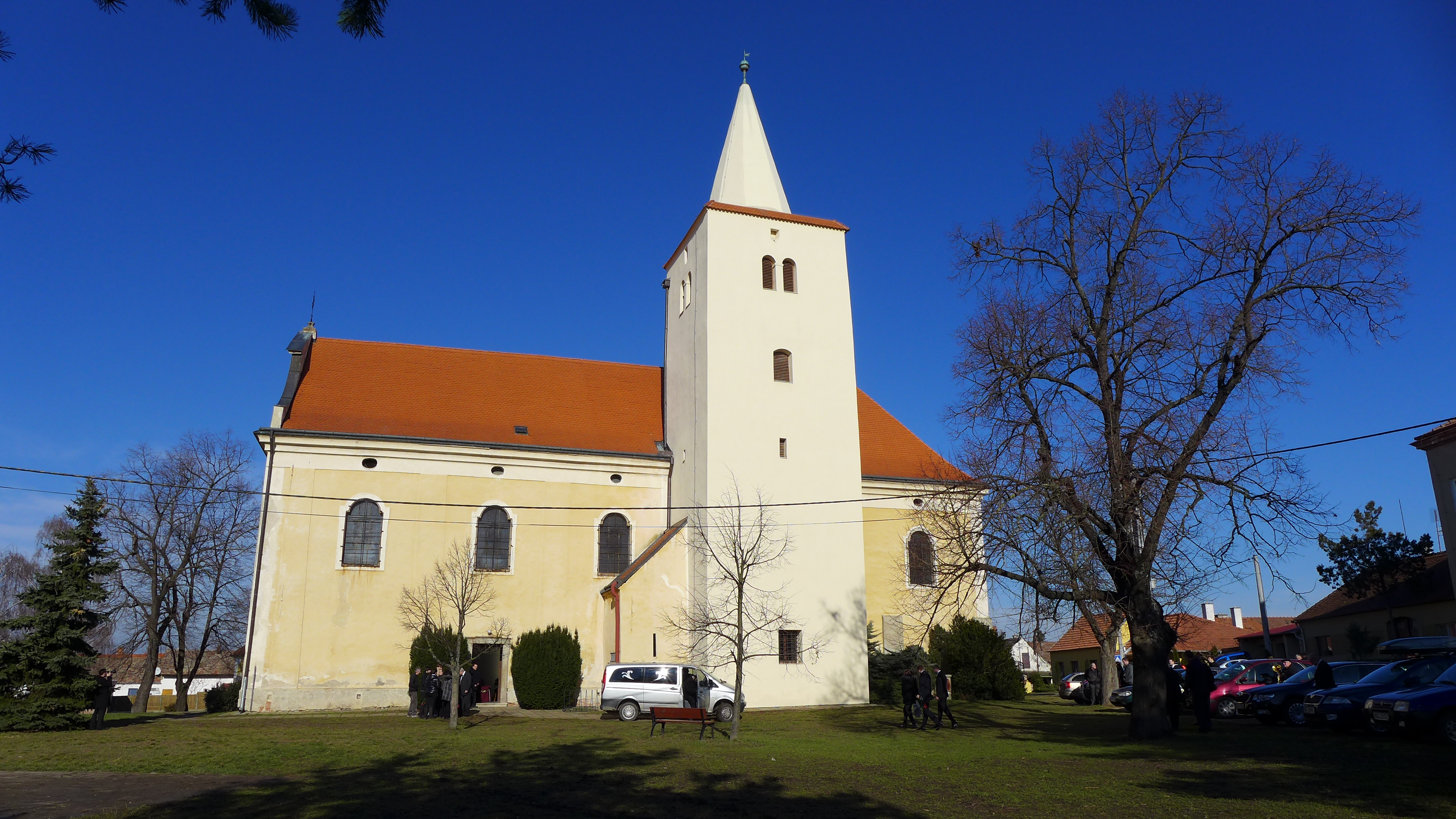
- Church of Saint John the Baptist

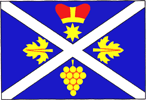
- Flag Coat of arms

- Location in the Czech Republic
- Coordinates: 48°47′59″N 16°6′2″E
- Country: Czech Republic
- Region: South Moravian
- District: Znojmo
- First mentioned: 1243

Area
  - Total: 19.67 km^{2} (7.59 sq mi)
- Elevation: 215 m (705 ft)

Population (2026-01-01)
  - Total: 1,292
  - Density: 65.68/km^{2} (170.1/sq mi)
- Time zone: UTC+1 (CET)
  - Summer (DST): UTC+2 (CEST)
- Postal codes: 669 02, 671 24
- Website: www.obec-vrbovec.cz

Vrbovec (German: Urbau) is a municipality and village in Znojmo District in the South Moravian Region of the Czech Republic. It has about 1,300 inhabitants.

Vrbovec lies approximately 9 kilometres (6 mi) south-east of Znojmo, 59 km (37 mi) south-west of Brno, and 189 km (117 mi) south-east of Prague.

== Administrative division ==
Vrbovec consists of two municipal parts (in brackets population according to the 2021 census):

- Vrbovec (988)
- Hnízdo (148)

== Demographics ==
Historical population
Year	Pop.	±%
1869	1,321	—
1880	1,434	+8.6%
1890	1,385	−3.4%
1900	1,462	+5.6%
1910	1,411	−3.5%
1921	1,438	+1.9%
1930	1,485	+3.3%
1950	796	−46.4%
1961	945	+18.7%
1970	960	+1.6%
1980	993	+3.4%
1991	989	−0.4%
2001	1,070	+8.2%
2011	1,118	+4.5%
2021	1,136	+1.6%
Source: Censuses
