= Čejkovice (Hodonín District) =

Municipality in the Czech Republic

- Municipality
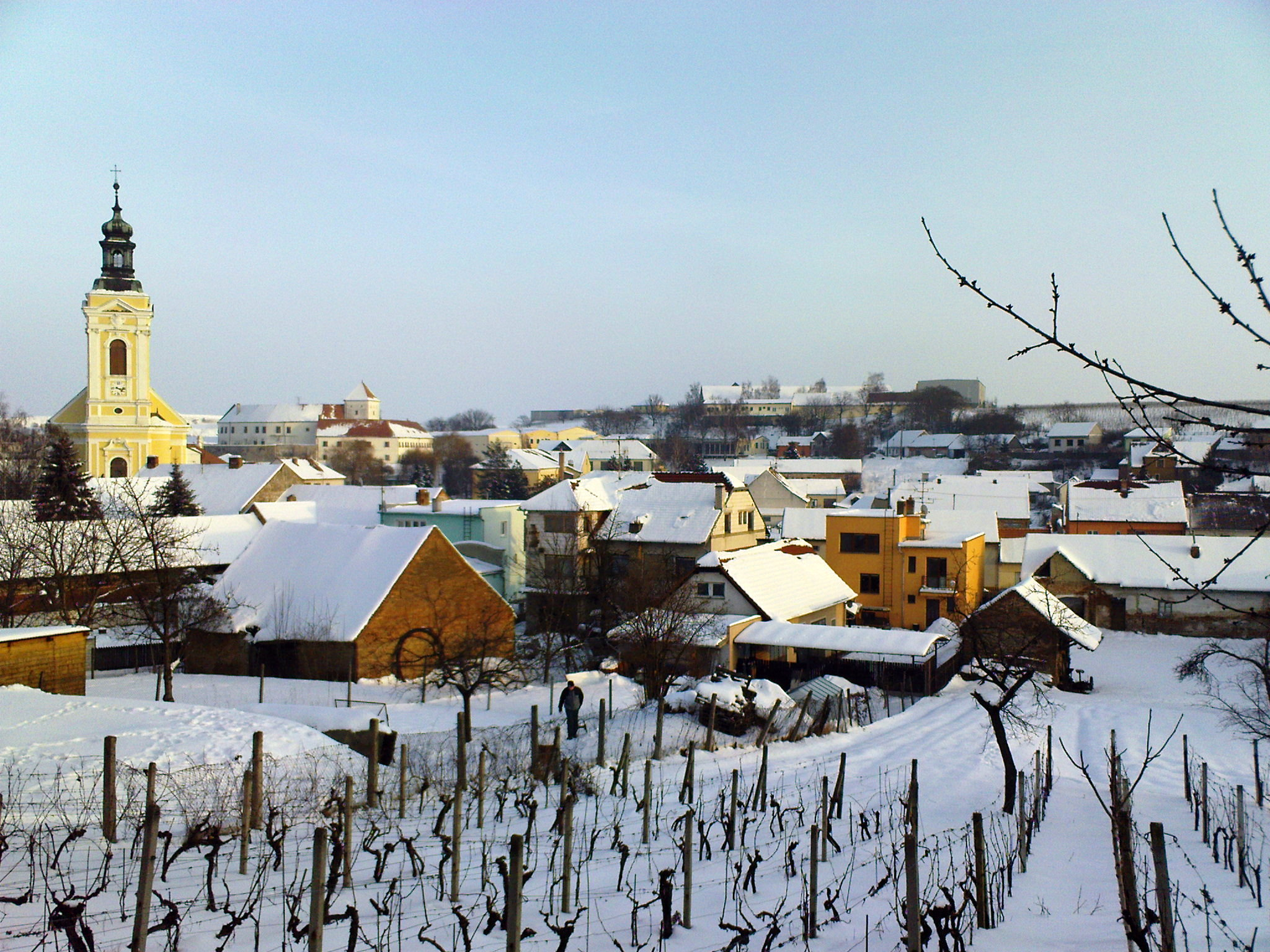
- General view of Čejkovice

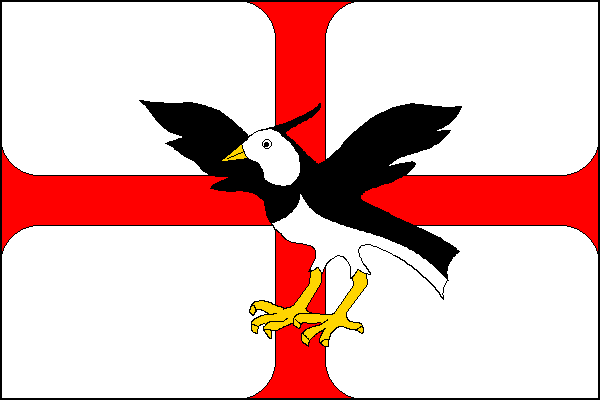
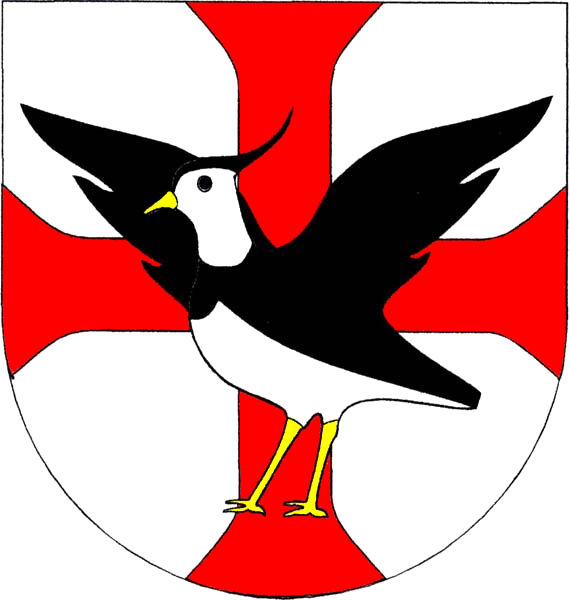
- Flag Coat of arms

- Location in the Czech Republic
- Coordinates: 48°54′21″N 16°56′32″E
- Country: Czech Republic
- Region: South Moravian
- District: Hodonín
- First mentioned: 1248

Area
  - Total: 25.03 km^{2} (9.66 sq mi)
- Elevation: 208 m (682 ft)

Population (2026-01-01)
  - Total: 2,360
  - Density: 94.3/km^{2} (244/sq mi)
- Time zone: UTC+1 (CET)
  - Summer (DST): UTC+2 (CEST)
- Postal code: 696 15
- Website: www.cejkovice.cz

Čejkovice (German: Czeikowitz) is a municipality and village in Hodonín District in the South Moravian Region of the Czech Republic. It has about 2,400 inhabitants.

== Geography ==
Čejkovice is located about 14 kilometres (9 mi) northwest of Hodonín and 39 km (24 mi) southeast of Brno. It lies in the Kyjov Hills. The highest point is at 324 m (1,063 ft) above sea level. The Prušánka Stream flows through the municipality.

== History ==
The first written mention of Čejkovice is from 1248, when the Knights Templar came to Čejkovice and subsequently founded here a commandery. In the 14th century, the village was acquired by the Lords of Lipá. The next owners of Čejkovice were the Sternberg family, Lords of Kunštát, Lords of Zástřizly, Lords of Lomnice and Lords of Víckov. In 1624, Emperor Ferdinand II donated the village to Jesuits. After the abolition of the order in 1773, the village was managed by a study fund for ten years. In 1783, Čejkovice was bought by Emperor Joseph II and annexed to the Hodonín estate.

== Demographics ==
Historical population

| Year | Pop. | ±% |
|---|---|---|
| 1869 | 1,876 | — |
| 1880 | 1,968 | +4.9% |
| 1890 | 1,995 | +1.4% |
| 1900 | 2,070 | +3.8% |
| 1910 | 2,191 | +5.8% |

| Year | Pop. | ±% |
|---|---|---|
| 1921 | 2,378 | +8.5% |
| 1930 | 2,476 | +4.1% |
| 1950 | 2,430 | −1.9% |
| 1961 | 2,726 | +12.2% |
| 1970 | 2,644 | −3.0% |

| Year | Pop. | ±% |
|---|---|---|
| 1980 | 2,653 | +0.3% |
| 1991 | 2,562 | −3.4% |
| 2001 | 2,564 | +0.1% |
| 2011 | 2,412 | −5.9% |
| 2021 | 2,310 | −4.2% |

Source: Censuses

== Economy ==
Čejkovice is known for viticulture. The municipality lies in the Slovácká wine subregion.

== Transport ==
There are no railways or major roads passing through the municipality.

== Sights ==
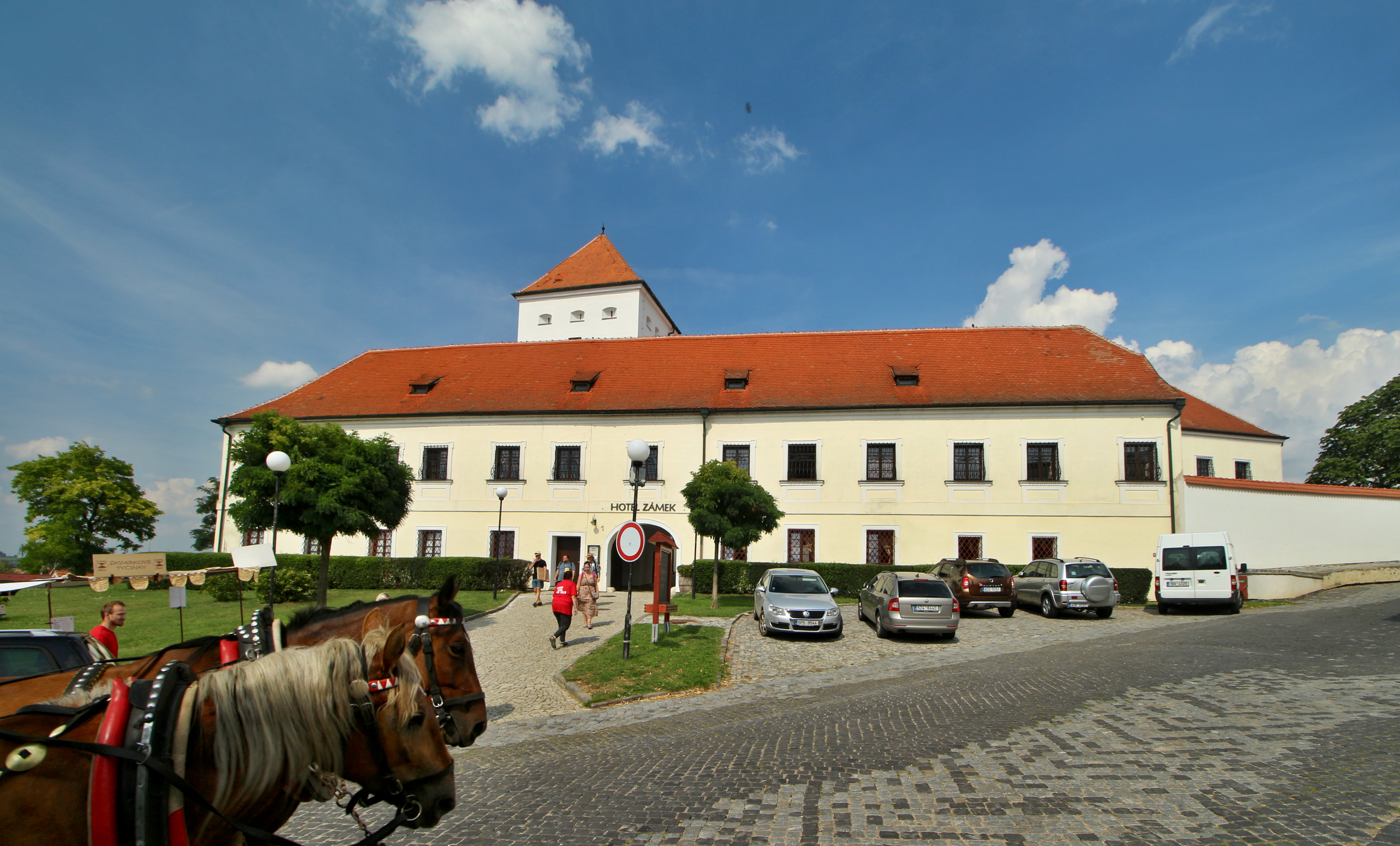
Čejkovice Castle

Among the main landmarks of Čejkovice are the church and the castle. The Church of Saint Cunigunde was built in the Baroque style in 1783, when it replaced an older church. In 1980–1892, the devastated church was reconstructed and the current tower was built.

A Gothic fortress was founded in Čejkovice in the second half of the 13th century. In the mid-16th century, it was rebuilt into the Renaissance castle. The southern Baroque wing was added to the castle in the first half of the 18th century. Today the castle houses a hotel.

== Notable people ==
- Tomáš Garrigue Masaryk (1850–1937), politician, president of Czechoslovakia; lived here in 1856–1861
