= Karl Beck (footballer) =

Austrian footballer

Personal information
- Date of birth: 8 May 1888
- Place of birth: Unter-Tannowitz, Moravia, Austria-Hungary (now Dolní Dunajovice, Czech Republic)
- Date of death: 16 February 1972 (aged 83)
- Place of death: Vienna, Austria
- Position: Forward

International career
Years	Team	Apps	(Gls)
1907–1918	Austria	9	(0)

Karl Beck (8 May 1888 – 16 February 1972) was an Austrian footballer. He played in nine matches for the Austria national football team from 1907 to 1918.
