= Dolní Dunajovice =

- Municipality
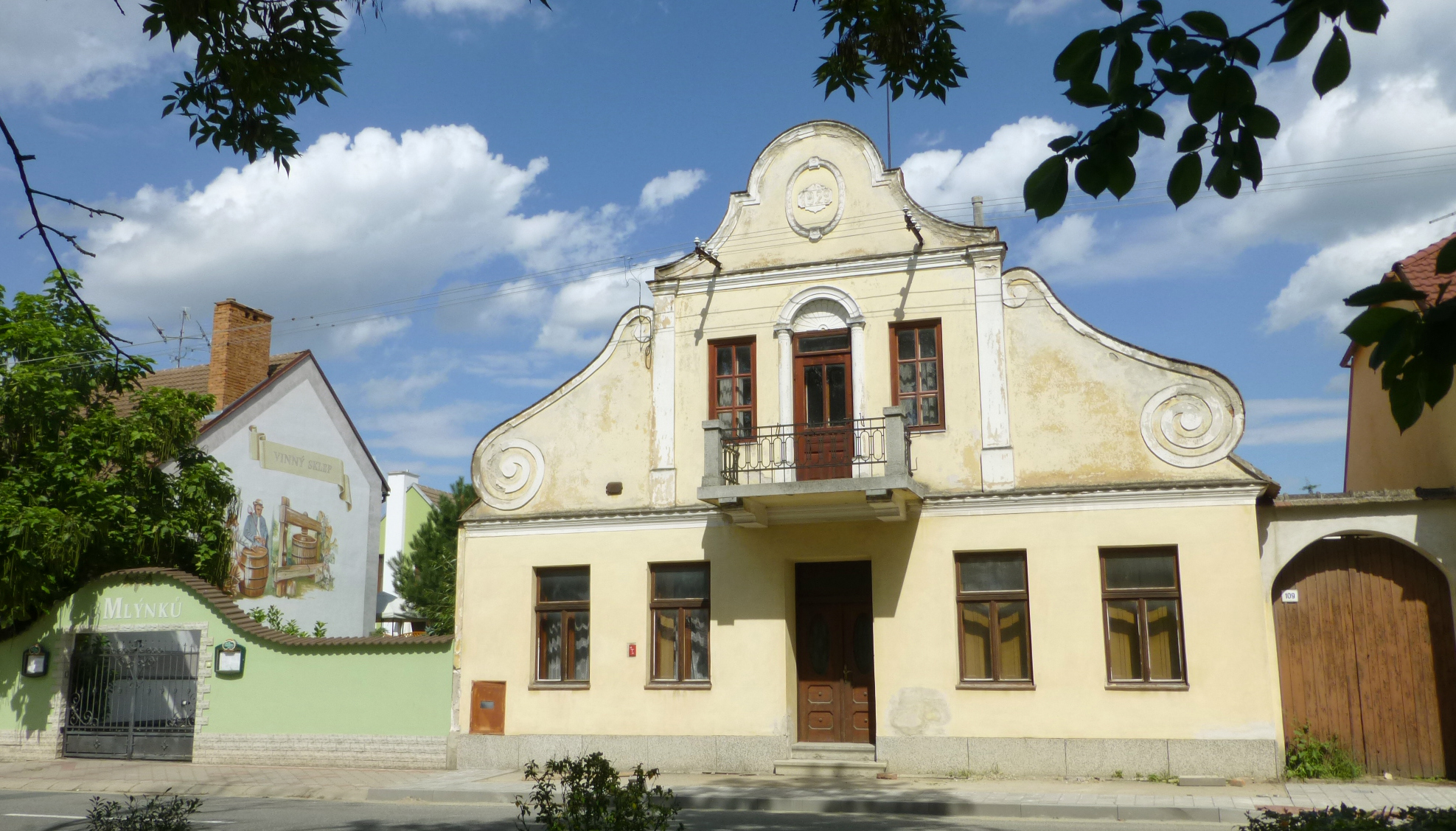
- Folk Baroque house

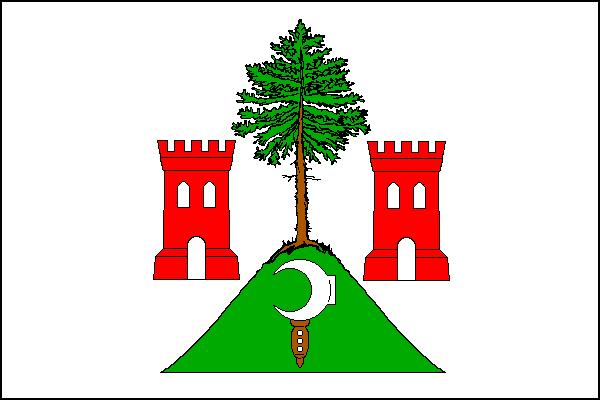
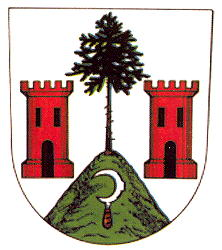
- Flag Coat of arms

- Location in the Czech Republic
- Coordinates: 48°51′16″N 16°35′34″E
- Country: Czech Republic
- Region: South Moravian
- District: Břeclav
- First Mentioned: 1183

Area
  - Total: 17.87 km^{2} (6.90 sq mi)
- Elevation: 183 m (600 ft)

Population (2026-01-01)
  - Total: 1,730
  - Density: 96.8/km^{2} (251/sq mi)
- Time zone: UTC+1 (CET)
  - Summer (DST): UTC+2 (CEST)
- Postal code: 691 85
- Website: www.dolni-dunajovice.cz

Dolní Dunajovice (German: Unter Tannowitz) is a municipality and village in Břeclav District in the South Moravian Region of the Czech Republic. It has about 1,700 inhabitants.

== History ==
The first written mention of Dunajovice is from 1183. In the 13th century, it was property of the convent in Dolní Kounice.

== Demographics ==
Historical population
Year	Pop.	±%
1869	2,473	—
1880	2,568	+3.8%
1890	2,664	+3.7%
1900	2,571	−3.5%
1910	2,690	+4.6%
1921	2,573	−4.3%
1930	2,778	+8.0%
1950	1,689	−39.2%
1961	1,819	+7.7%
1970	1,779	−2.2%
1980	1,791	+0.7%
1991	1,704	−4.9%
2001	1,705	+0.1%
2011	1,687	−1.1%
2021	1,628	−3.5%
Source: Censuses

== Notable people ==
- Karl Renner (1870–1950), Austrian chancellor and president
- Karl Beck (1888–1972), Austrian footballer
