= Pálava (grape) =

Variety of grape

- Grape (Vitis)
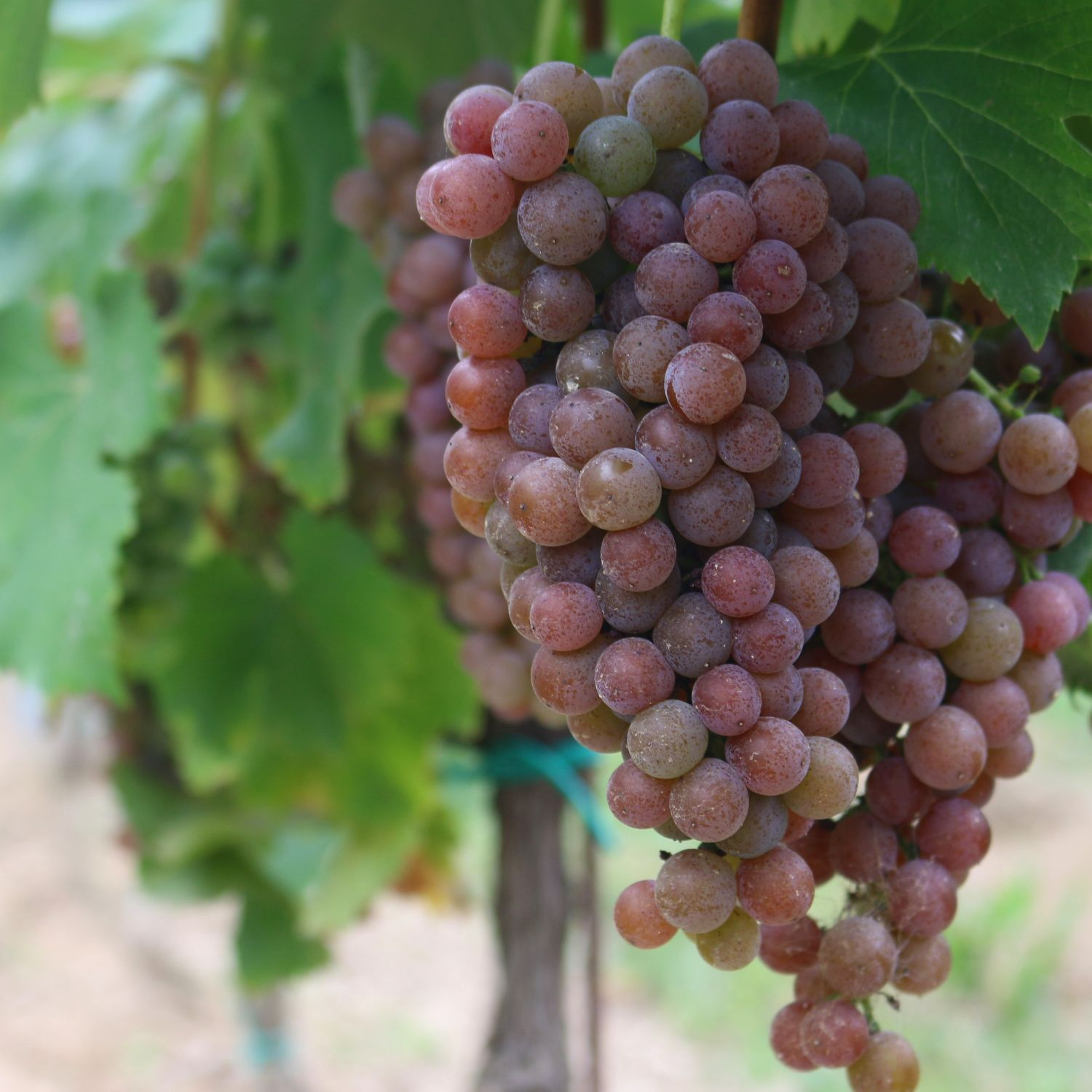
- Pálava grape cluster
- Color of berry skin: Blanc
- Species: Vitis vinifera
- Origin: Czech Republic
- Original pedigree: Gewürztraminer × Müller Thurgau
- Pedigree parent 1: Gewürztraminer
- Pedigree parent 2: Müller Thurgau
- Year of crossing: 1953
- VIVC number: 8875

Pálava is a variety of white wine grape developed in 1953 by Josef Veverka in Moravia. The variety is a genetic crossbreed of the Gewürztraminer and Müller Thurgau grape varieties.

The variety has not spread far beyond its homeland, outside of the Czech Republic is planted in Slovakia, albeit in small quantities. In 2018 it was grown in the Czech Republic on 594 hectares of vineyards, mostly (45%) in the Mikulov region.

Pálava wines are typically full-bodied, aromatic and subtly sweet. Their colour is golden-yellow.

== See also ==
- Czech wine
- List of grape varieties
