= Velké Pavlovice =

- Town
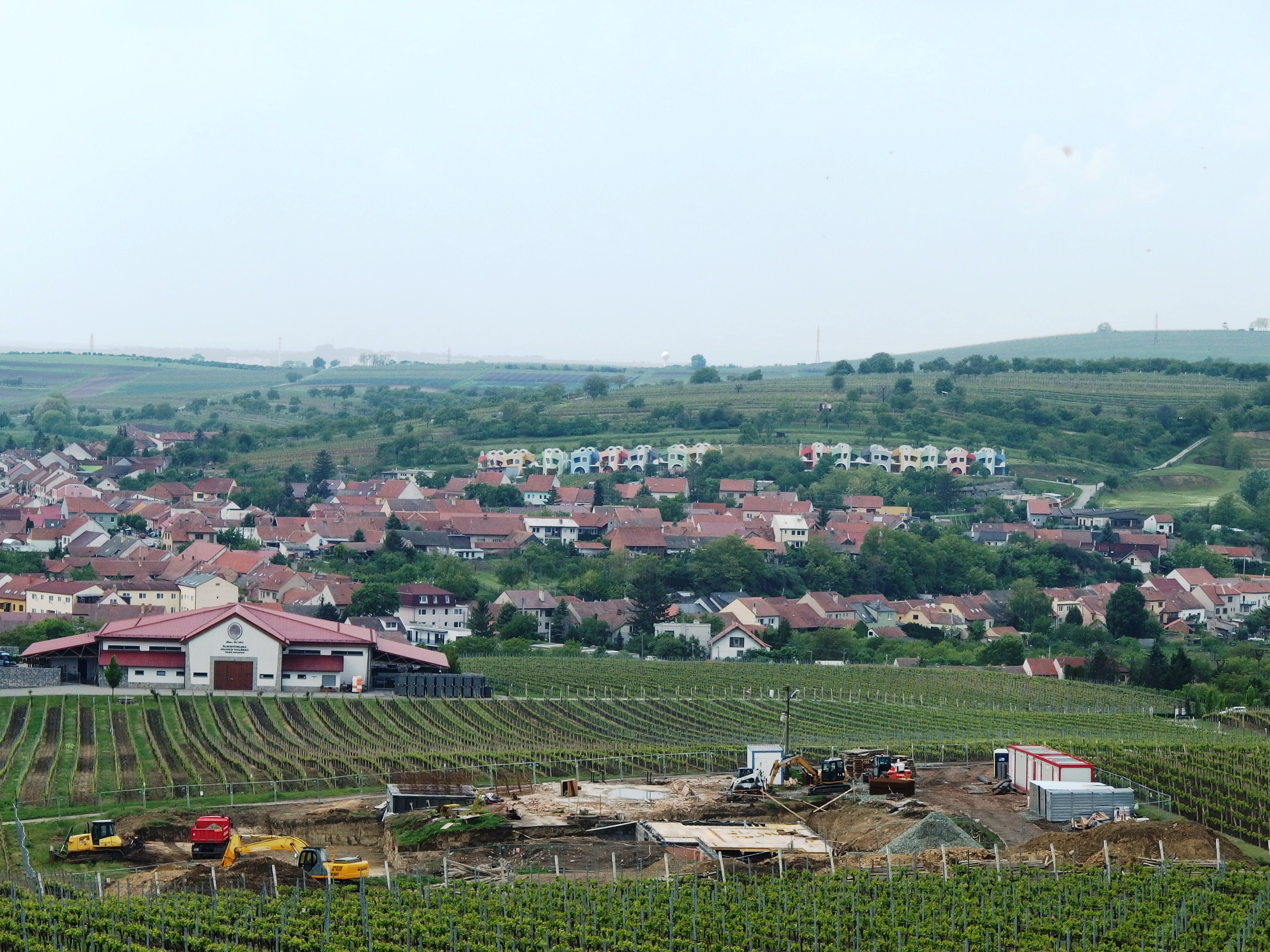
- View from the east

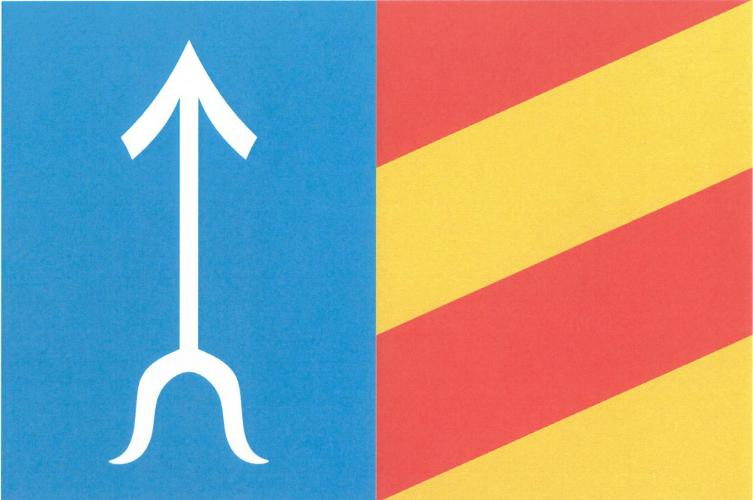
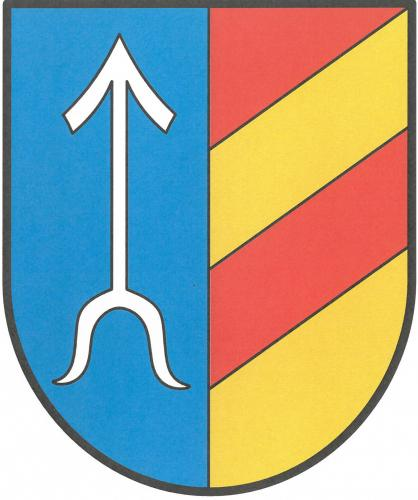
- Flag Coat of arms

- Location in the Czech Republic
- Coordinates: 48°54′17″N 16°48′58″E
- Country: Czech Republic
- Region: South Moravian
- District: Břeclav
- First mentioned: 1252

Government
  - Mayor: Petr Hasil

Area
  - Total: 23.25 km^{2} (8.98 sq mi)
- Elevation: 182 m (597 ft)

Population (2026-01-01)
  - Total: 3,112
  - Density: 133.8/km^{2} (346.7/sq mi)
- Time zone: UTC+1 (CET)
  - Summer (DST): UTC+2 (CEST)
- Postal code: 691 06
- Website: www.velke-pavlovice.cz

Velké Pavlovice (Czech pronunciation: [ˈvɛlkɛː ˈpavlovɪtsɛ]; German: Groß Pawlowitz) is a town in Břeclav District in the South Moravian Region of the Czech Republic. It has about 3,100 inhabitants. The town is located on the Trkmanka River, on the border between the Ždánice Forest range, Lower Morava Valley and Kyjov Hills.

Velké Pavlovice was founded in the 13th century at the latest, but it became a town only in 1967. The town and its surroundings is known for viticulture and winemaking.

== Geography ==
Velké Pavlovice is located about 16 kilometres (10 mi) north of Břeclav. Most of the municipal territory lies in the Ždánice Forest range, only the southern part extends into the Lower Morava Valley and Kyjov Hills. The highest point is the Tabulka hill at 298 m (978 ft) above sea level. The Trkmanka River flows through the town.

== History ==
The first written mention of Velké Pavlovice is from 1252, when the settlement gave tithes from vineyards to the newly founded Cistercian abbey in Žďár nad Sázavou. It frequently changed its owners. During the Thirty Years' War, Velké Pavlovice was one of the worst damaged villages in the region. The village recovered in the first half of the 18th century.

In 1891 Velké Pavlovice was promoted to a market town by Emperor Franz Joseph. In 1967, it became a town.

== Demographics ==
Historical population

Year	Pop.	±%
1869	2,035	—
1880	2,382	+17.1%
1890	2,383	+0.0%
1900	2,566	+7.7%
1910	2,628	+2.4%

Year	Pop.	±%
1921	2,847	+8.3%
1930	2,774	−2.6%
1950	2,622	−5.5%
1961	2,858	+9.0%
1970	2,850	−0.3%

Year	Pop.	±%
1980	2,998	+5.2%
1991	3,092	+3.1%
2001	3,101	+0.3%
2011	3,044	−1.8%
2021	3,070	+0.9%

Source: Censuses

== Economy ==
The area of Velké Pavlovice is known for viticulture and winemaking. It gave its name to the Velkopavlovická wine subregion.

== Transport ==
The D2 motorway from Brno to the border with Slovakia runs next to the town.

Velké Pavlovice is located on the Kobylí–Zaječí railway line of local importance.

== Sights ==
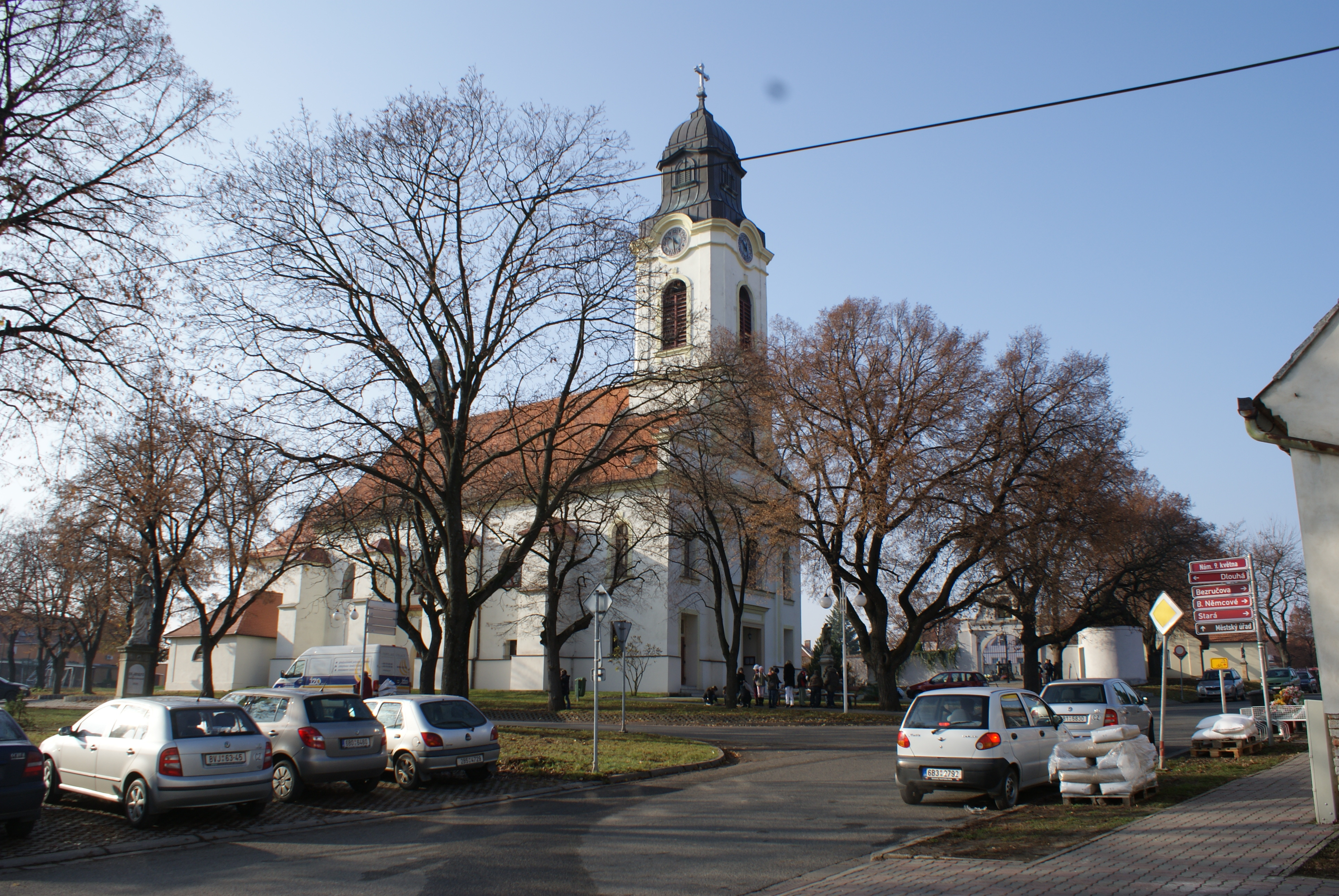
Church of the Assumption of the Virgin Mary

The main landmark of Velké Pavlovice is the Church of the Assumption of the Virgin Mary. It is an early Baroque church built in 1670–1680 and rebuilt in the mid-19th century.

== Notable people ==
- Rudolf Kassner (1873–1959), Austrian writer and philosopher

== Twin towns — sister cities ==
Velké Pavlovice is twinned with:

- Senica, Slovakia
- Ždírec nad Doubravou, Czech Republic
