= Kobylí =

- Municipality
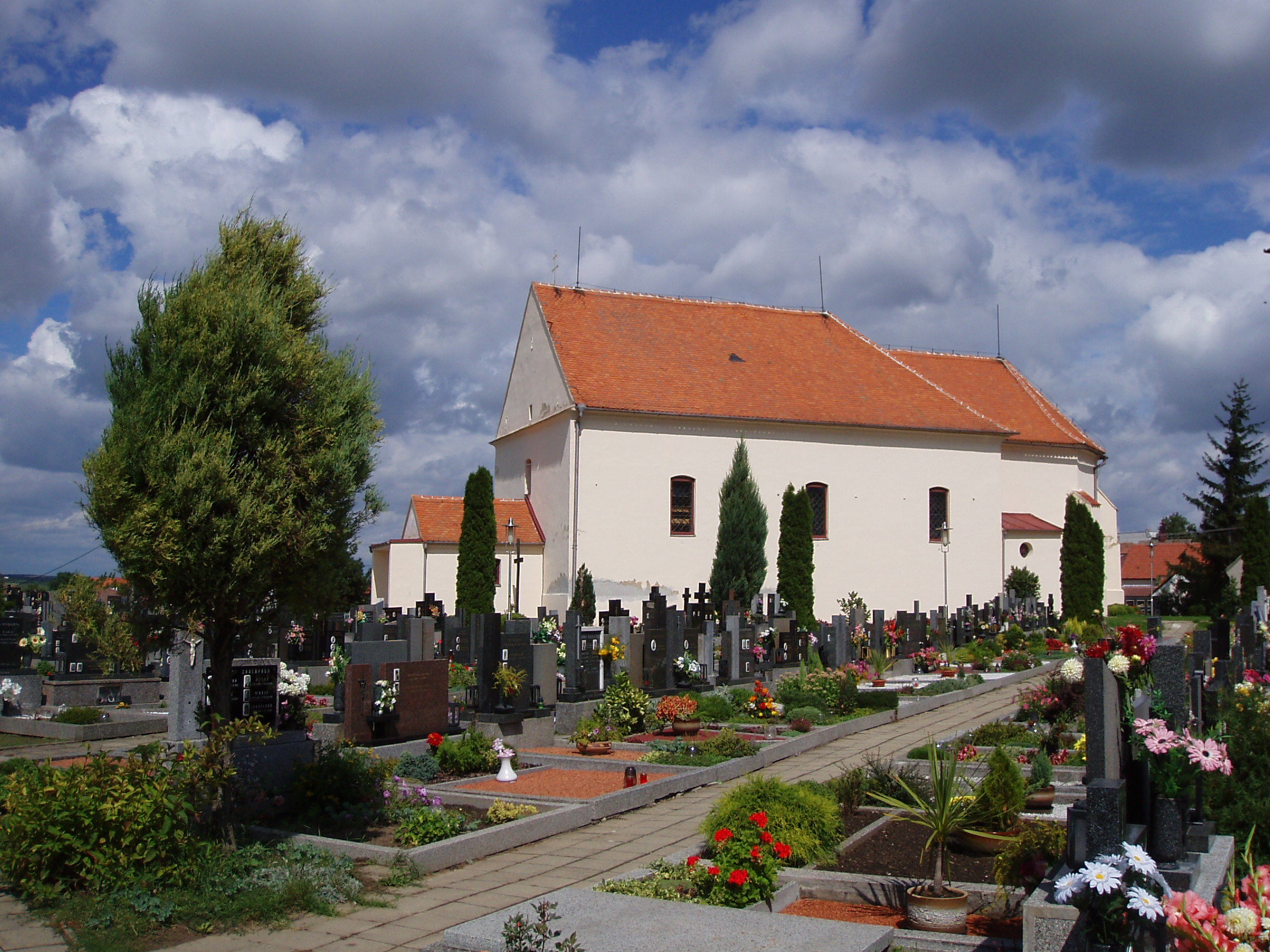
- Church of Saint George

- Flag Coat of arms

- Location in the Czech Republic
- Coordinates: 48°55′58″N 16°53′30″E
- Country: Czech Republic
- Region: South Moravian
- District: Břeclav
- First mentioned: 1252

Area
  - Total: 21.04 km^{2} (8.12 sq mi)
- Elevation: 205 m (673 ft)

Population (2026-01-01)
  - Total: 1,961
  - Density: 93.20/km^{2} (241.4/sq mi)
- Time zone: UTC+1 (CET)
  - Summer (DST): UTC+2 (CEST)
- Postal code: 691 10
- Website: www.kobyli.cz

Kobylí is a municipality and village in Břeclav District in the South Moravian Region of the Czech Republic. It has about 2,000 inhabitants.

== Geography ==
Kobylí is located about 18 kilometres (11 mi) north of Břeclav and 35 km (22 mi) southeast of Brno. The municipal territory lies mostly in the Ždánice Forest, but it also extends into the Kyjov Hills in the east. The highest point is the hill Kobylí vrch at 334 m (1,096 ft) above sea level. The Trkmanka River flows through the municipality.

== History ==
The first written mention of Kobylí is from 1252, when the village was donated to the Cistercian monastery in Žďár nad Sázavou. Vineyards in Kobylí were mentioned already in 1255. From 1312 to 1594, Kobylí was owned by the Lords of Lipá as part of the Hodonín estate. About 100 people lived in the village in 1594. In 1594–1614, the estate was a property of the Counts of Salm-Neuburg.

In 1614–1647, Kobylí was ruled by the Žampach of Potštejn family. During the Thirty Years' War, the village was repeatedly looted and only ten inhabitants left. After 1647, it changed hands several times, until it was acquired by a branch of the Liechtenstein family in 1692.

== Demographics ==
Historical population

Year	Pop.	±%
1869	1,560	—
1880	1,810	+16.0%
1890	1,697	−6.2%
1900	1,801	+6.1%
1910	1,855	+3.0%

Year	Pop.	±%
1921	2,082	+12.2%
1930	2,208	+6.1%
1950	2,174	−1.5%
1961	2,388	+9.8%
1970	2,266	−5.1%

Year	Pop.	±%
1980	2,220	−2.0%
1991	2,103	−5.3%
2001	2,092	−0.5%
2011	2,074	−0.9%
2021	1,893	−8.7%

Source: Censuses

== Transport ==
Kobylí is the terminus and start of a short railway line to Zaječí.

== Sights ==
The main landmark of Kobylí is the Church of Saint George. It is a Gothic-Baroque building.
