= Rakvice =

- Municipality
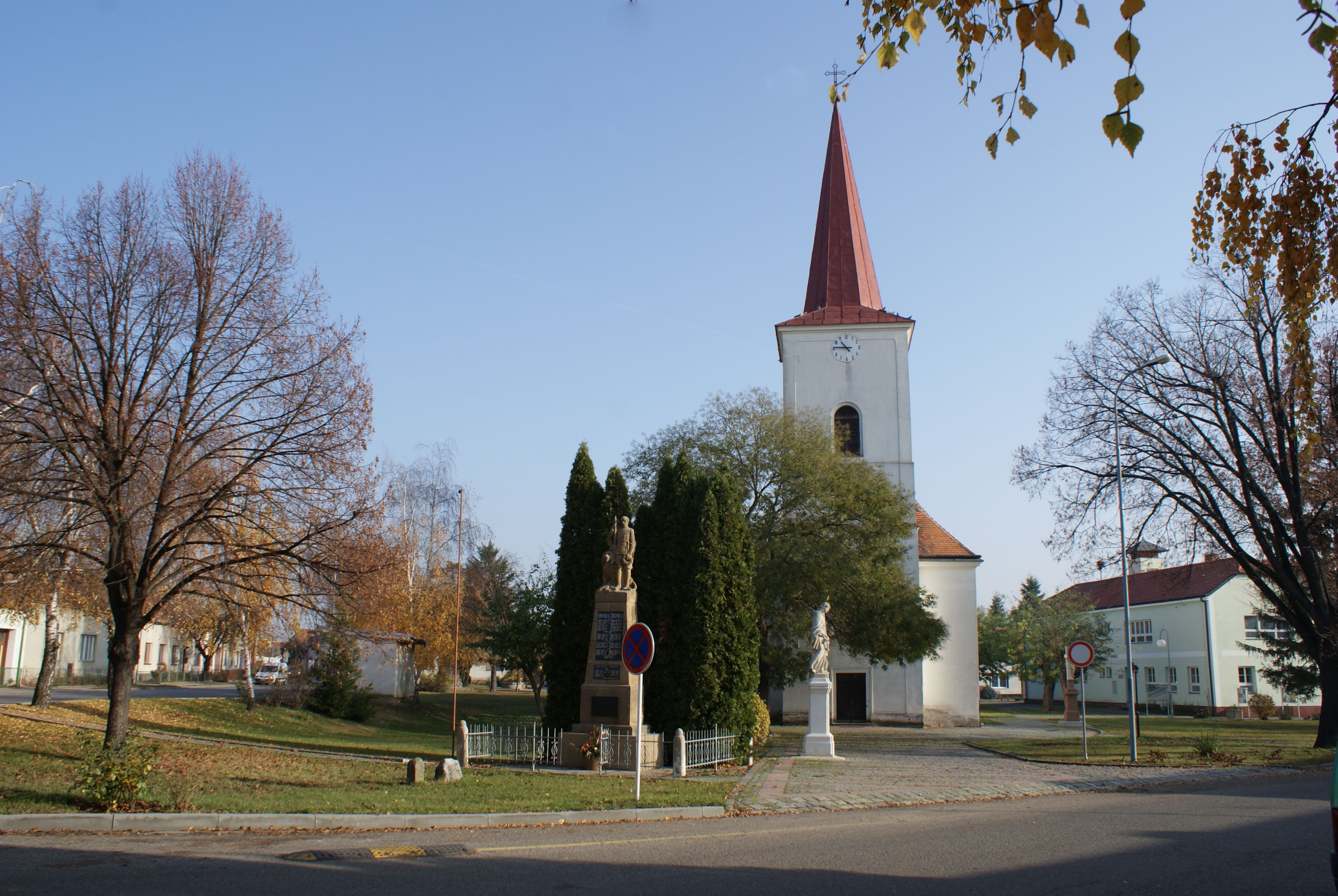
- Centre of Rakvice

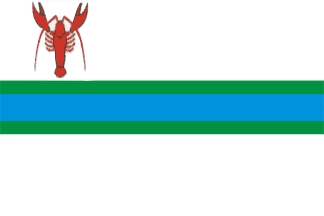
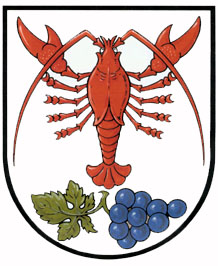
- Flag Coat of arms

- Location in the Czech Republic
- Coordinates: 48°51′29″N 16°48′48″E
- Country: Czech Republic
- Region: South Moravian
- District: Břeclav
- First mentioned: 1248

Area
  - Total: 21.79 km^{2} (8.41 sq mi)
- Elevation: 164 m (538 ft)

Population (2026-01-01)
  - Total: 2,247
  - Density: 103.1/km^{2} (267.1/sq mi)
- Time zone: UTC+1 (CET)
  - Summer (DST): UTC+2 (CEST)
- Postal code: 691 03
- Website: www.rakvice.cz

Rakvice is a municipality and village in Břeclav District in the South Moravian Region of the Czech Republic. It has about 2,200 inhabitants.

== Etymology ==
The name is derived from the personal name Rak. The word rak means 'crayfish' in Czech.

== Geography ==
Rakvice is located about 12 kilometres (7 mi) north of Břeclav and 40 km (25 mi) south of Brno. It lies in a flat agricultural landscape in the Lower Morava Valley. The Trkmanka River flows through the municipality. The territory of Rakvice is rich in fishponds.

== History ==
The first written mention of Rakvice is from 1248. In 1604 at the latest, it became a market town, however the Thirty Years' War devastated Rakvice and it became a village again.

== Demographics ==
Historical population

Year	Pop.	±%
1869	1,546	—
1880	1,960	+26.8%
1890	2,056	+4.9%
1900	2,141	+4.1%
1910	2,161	+0.9%

Year	Pop.	±%
1921	2,377	+10.0%
1930	2,403	+1.1%
1950	2,010	−16.4%
1961	2,256	+12.2%
1970	2,163	−4.1%

Year	Pop.	±%
1980	2,169	+0.3%
1991	2,105	−3.0%
2001	2,074	−1.5%
2011	2,120	+2.2%
2021	2,103	−0.8%

Source: Censuses

== Economy ==
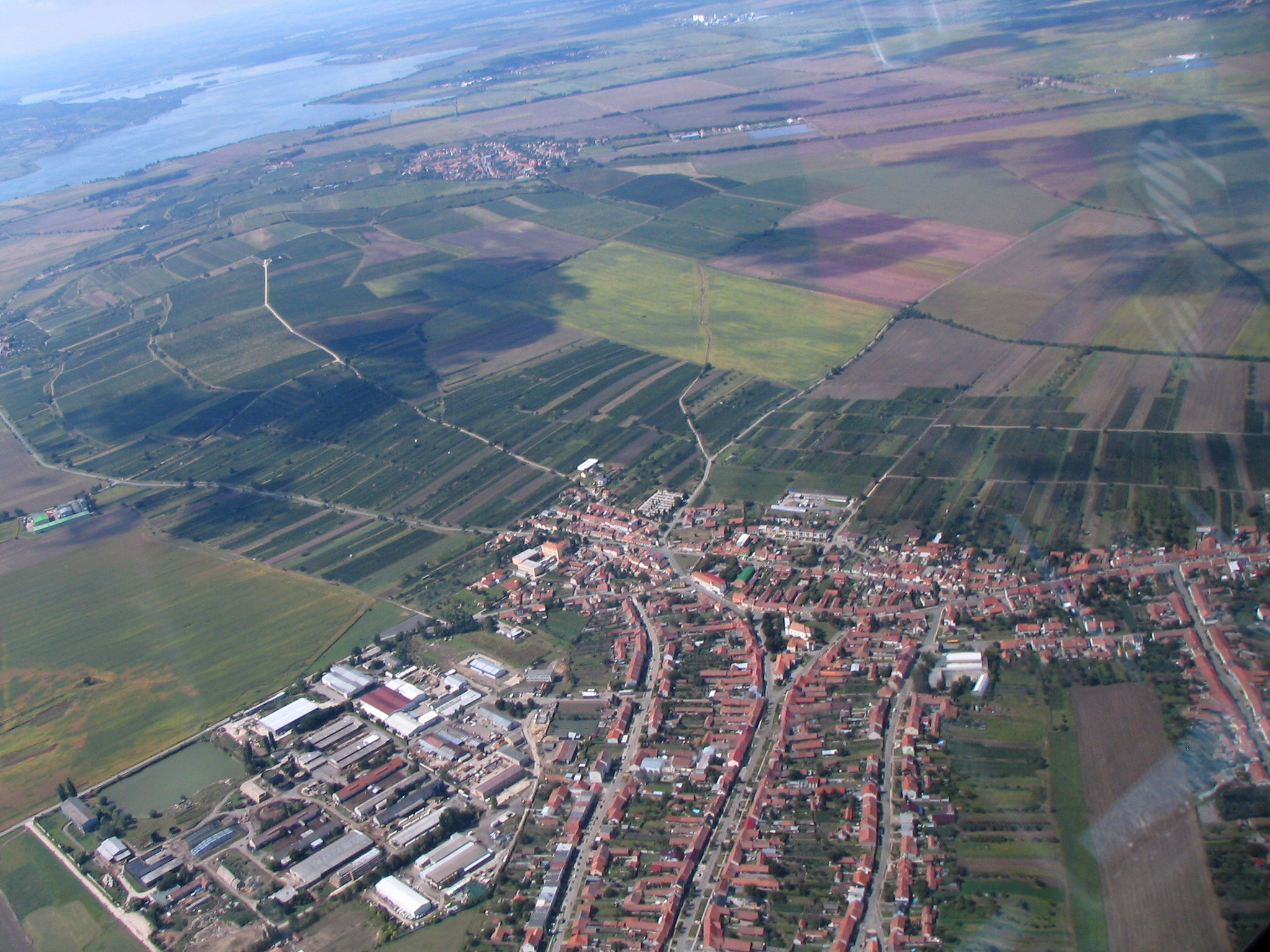
Aerial view

Rakvice is known for its large vineyards and is known for its long winemaking tradition. It lies in the Velkopavlovická wine subregion.

== Transport ==
The D2 motorway (part of the European route E65) from Brno to Břeclav passes through the municipal territory.

Rakvice is located on the Brno–Staré Město railway line.

== Sights ==
The main landmark of Rakvice is the Church of Saint John the Baptist. After the original church was completely destroyed during the Thirty Years' War, it was rebuilt and extended in the second half of the 17th century.
