= Central Moravian Carpathians =

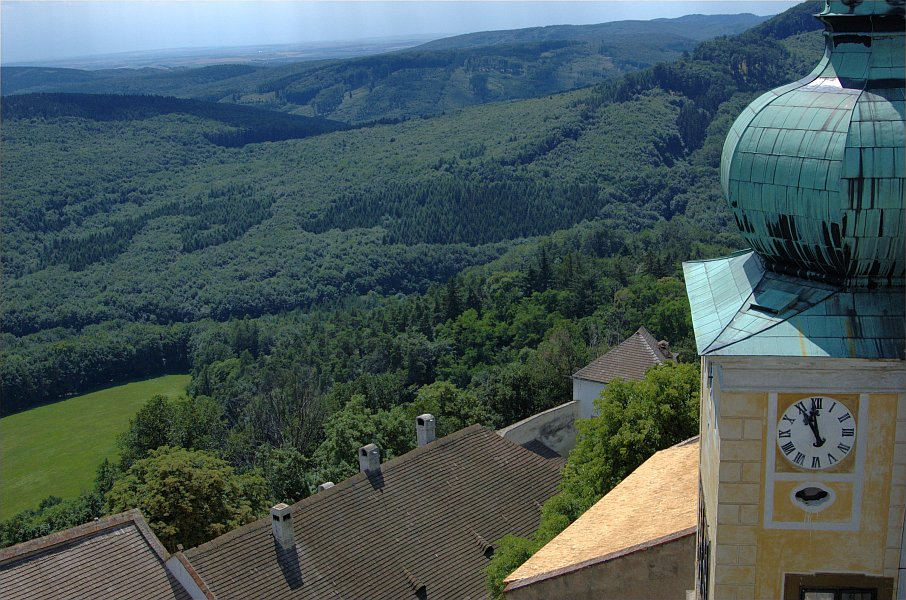
- Buchlov Castle in the Chřiby highlands

Highest point
- Peak: Brdo
- Elevation: 587 m (1,926 ft)
- Coordinates: 49°10′16″N 17°18′32″E

Naming
- Native name: Středomoravské Karpaty (Czech)

Geography
- Central Moravian Carpathians (marked in red) within the Outer Western Carpathians
- Country: Czech Republic
- Regions: South Moravian, Zlín
- Parent range: Outer Western Carpathians
- Borders on: Slovak-Moravian Carpathians

The Central Moravian Carpathians (Czech: Středomoravské Karpaty) are a mountain range within the Czech Republic belonging to the Outer Western Carpathians.

Despite the name, they stand in southern Moravia, east of Brno. In the east, they border on the Slovak-Moravian Carpathians; in the south, they stretch down to the Thaya Valley and the South-Moravian Carpathians. The mountains are mostly forested, planted with beech and spruce trees.

== Mining industry ==
Lignite mining

In the past, from 1824 up until the 1990s, lignite was mined in the Kyjov hills. These hills house the Kyjov field, part of the South Moravian lignite basin. The field is 15 km long and 4 km wide, and its thickness being 3-6 m.

The Julius mine, near Šardice was first opened in 1911. At the beginning of the 1940s, the yearly yield of lignite was 55 000 tonnes. In the year 1960, the mine was renamed to the 9th of May mine. Up until its closure in 1978, the mine produced a total of 3 689 200 tonnes of lignite.

The Dukla mine was opened in 1965. On the 9th of June 1970, after a heavy storm, the mine was flooded. These events took the lives of 34 miners. The mine was closed on the 21st of December 1992 with its average yearly yield being 550 - 600 thousand tonnes of lignite.

Oil industry

The Central Moravian Carpathians are home to deposits of paraffin oil. In 1973, a deposit was opened near Ždánice. Since 1978, rigs have been extracting near Koryčany. In 2006, the total amount of oil extracted was 18,600 tonnes. In 1986, near the town of Dambořice, one of the largest deposits in the whole of Czechia was discovered. Its daily yield makes up 55% of the oil production of the country. Other deposits have been found near Uhřice, Kostelany and Bučovice.

Building material mining

With short breaks in service, the Žlutava quarry has been continuously running since the second half of the 19th century up until today (as of 2026). It specialises in the mining of silicate-limestone sandstone. It has been operated by Kamenolom Žlutava s.r.o. since 1997.

== Subdivision ==
The Central Moravian Carpathians are geomorphologically subdivided into:

- Ždánice Forest (Czech: Ždánický les)
- Litenčice Hills (Litenčická pahorkatina)
- Chřiby, with Mt. Brdo, highest point of the Moravian uplands
- Kyjov Hills (Kyjovská pahorkatina).
