= Čejč =

- Municipality
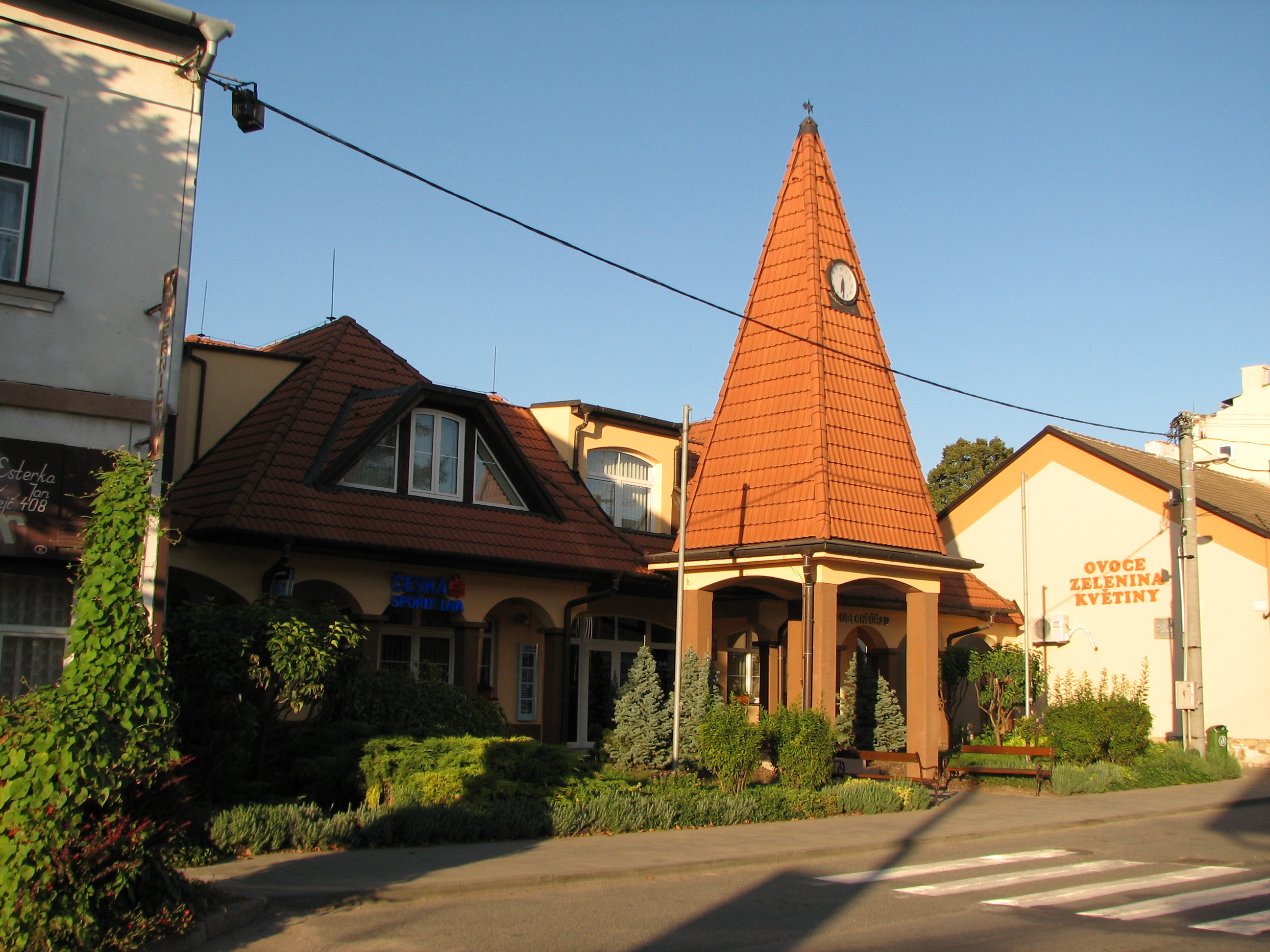
- Municipal office

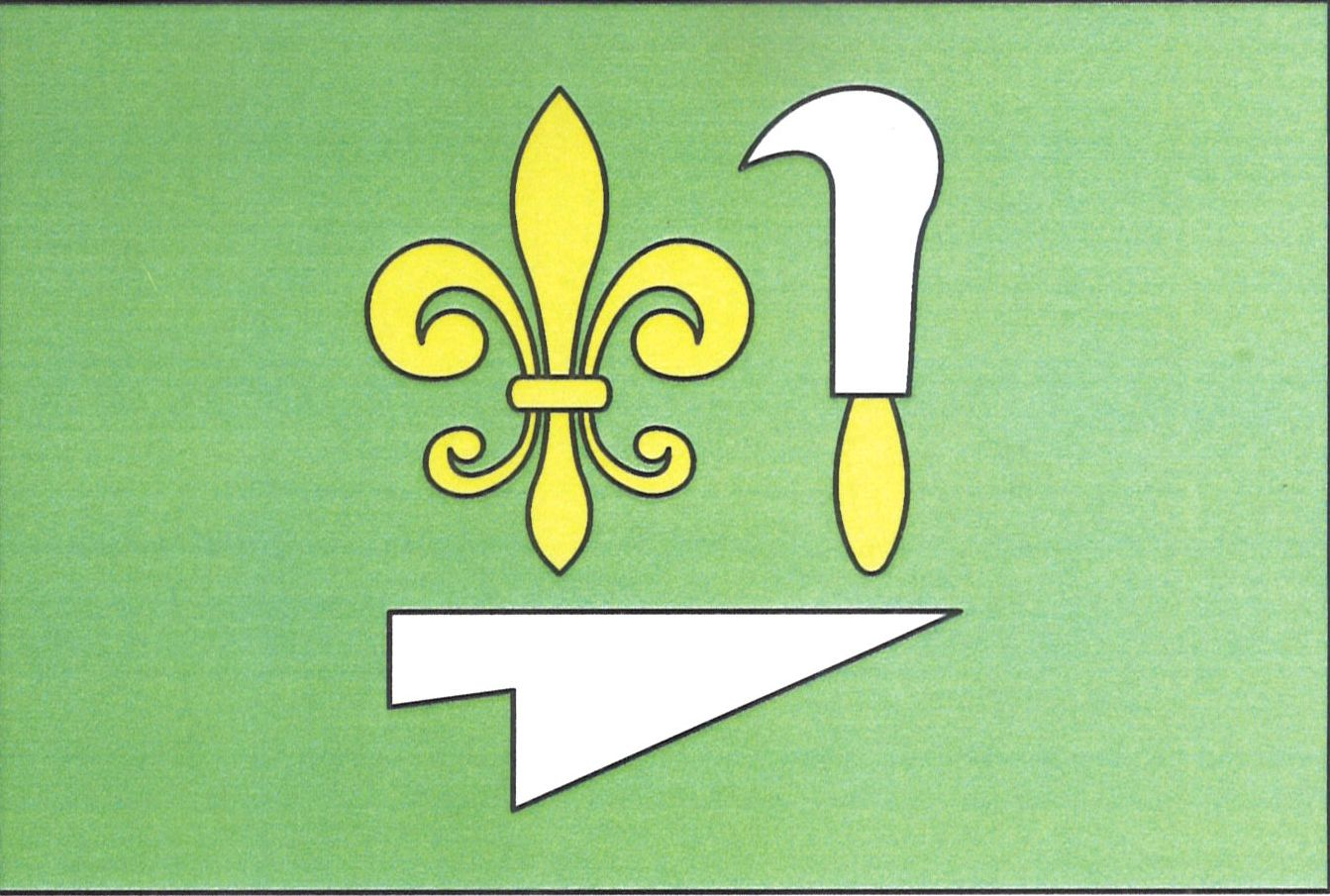
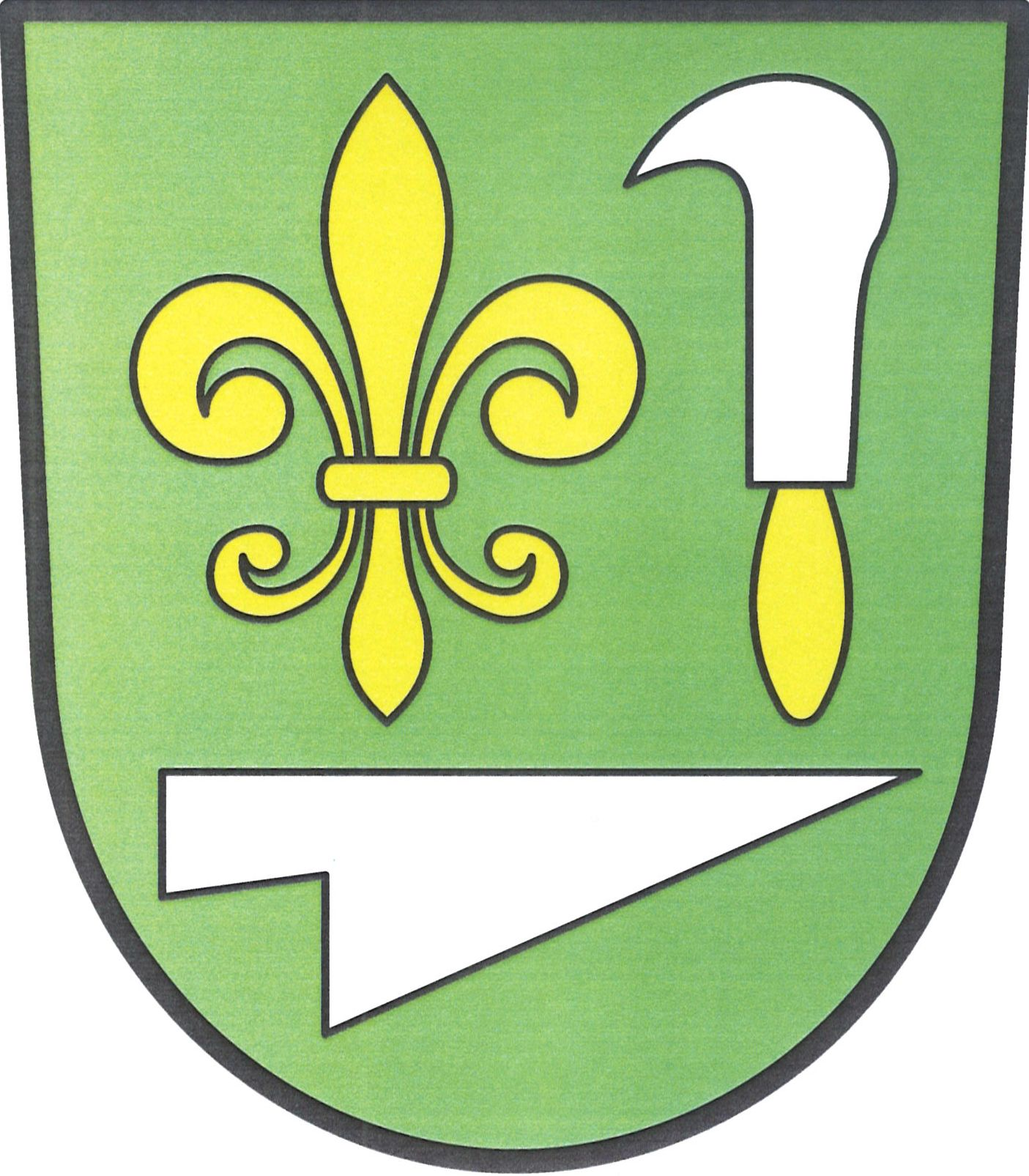
- Flag Coat of arms

- Location in the Czech Republic
- Coordinates: 48°56′48″N 16°57′54″E
- Country: Czech Republic
- Region: South Moravian
- District: Hodonín
- First mentioned: 1222

Area
  - Total: 13.29 km^{2} (5.13 sq mi)
- Elevation: 183 m (600 ft)

Population (2026-01-01)
  - Total: 1,259
  - Density: 94.73/km^{2} (245.4/sq mi)
- Time zone: UTC+1 (CET)
  - Summer (DST): UTC+2 (CEST)
- Postal code: 696 14
- Website: www.cejc.cz

Čejč (German: Czejtsch, Tscheitsch) is a municipality and village in Hodonín District in the South Moravian Region of the Czech Republic. It has about 1,300 inhabitants.

== Etymology ==
The initial name of the village was Čaječ. It was derived from the personal name Čajek, meaning "Čajek's (property)". The personal name was a domestic form of some name containing -čaj (Dobročaj, Bolečaj, etc.).

== Geography ==
Čejč is located about 15 kilometres (9 mi) northwest of Hodonín and 36 km (22 mi) southeast of Brno. It lies in the Kyjov Hills. The highest point is the hill Kobylská skála at 264 m (866 ft) above sea level.

== History ==
The first written mention of Čejč is from 1222. In 1335, it was referred to as a market town with rights to hold markets and brew beer. Čejč was destroyed during the Hussite Wars and in 1459 it was described as abandoned. In 1769, the village was re-established. In 1825, a spa with a curative sulfur spring was established here, which brought prosperity and development to Čejč.

== Demographics ==
Historical population

| Year | Pop. | ±% |
|---|---|---|
| 1869 | 622 | — |
| 1880 | 723 | +16.2% |
| 1890 | 667 | −7.7% |
| 1900 | 775 | +16.2% |
| 1910 | 875 | +12.9% |

| Year | Pop. | ±% |
|---|---|---|
| 1921 | 1,002 | +14.5% |
| 1930 | 1,005 | +0.3% |
| 1950 | 1,035 | +3.0% |
| 1961 | 1,152 | +11.3% |
| 1970 | 1,194 | +3.6% |

| Year | Pop. | ±% |
|---|---|---|
| 1980 | 1,248 | +4.5% |
| 1991 | 1,222 | −2.1% |
| 2001 | 1,243 | +1.7% |
| 2011 | 1,239 | −0.3% |
| 2021 | 1,181 | −4.7% |

Source: Censuses

== Transport ==
Čejč is located on the railway line Hodonín–Zaječí, but trains only run on weekends.

== Sights ==
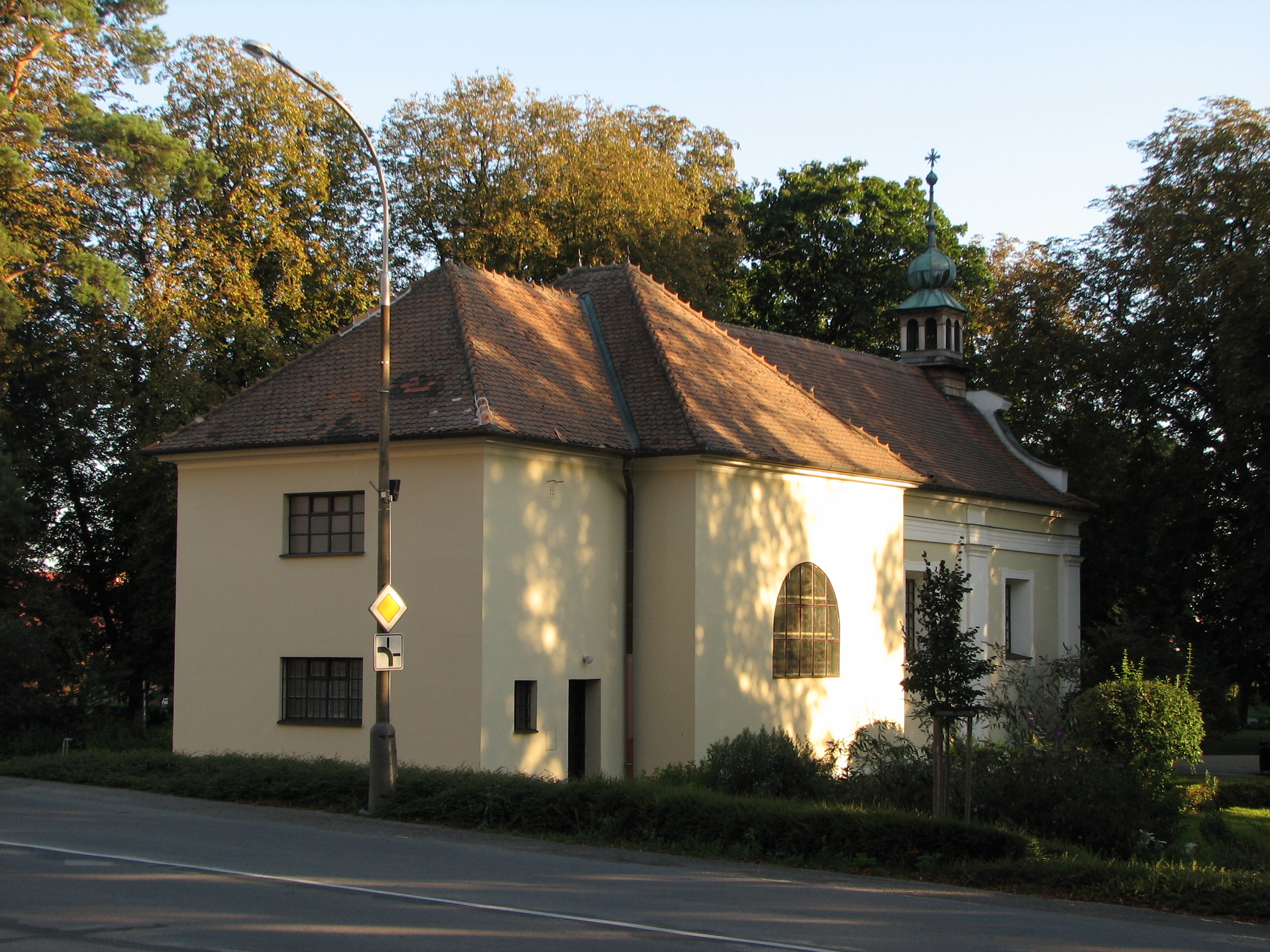
Church of Saint Wendelin

The main landmark of Čejč is the Church of Saint Wendelin. It was built in the Baroque style in 1730–1731 and modified in the 20th century.

The most valuable monument is a statue of Saint Cajetan from 1722, created at the expense of the Countess of Liechtenstein.

== External name ==
- Official website
