= Velké Bílovice =

- Town
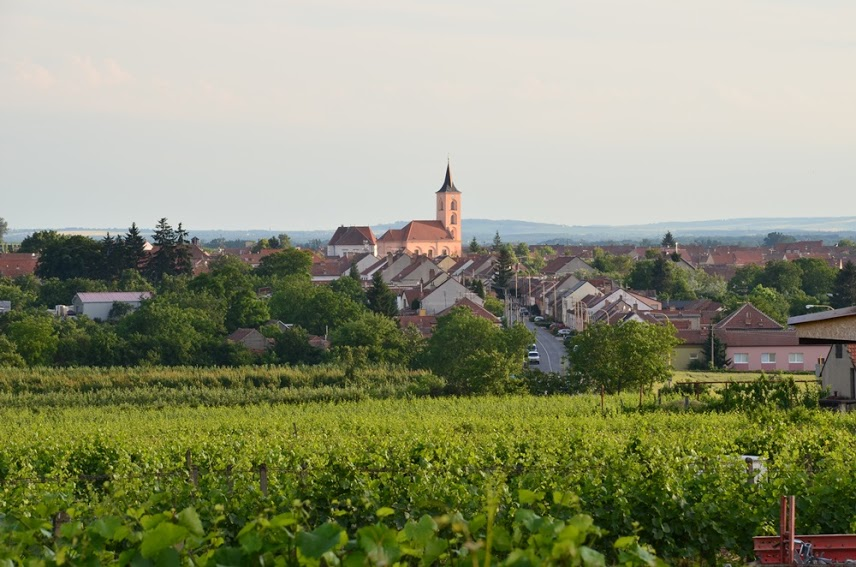
- View from the northeast

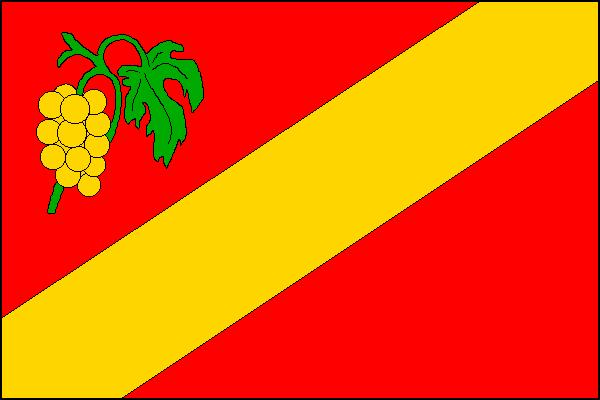
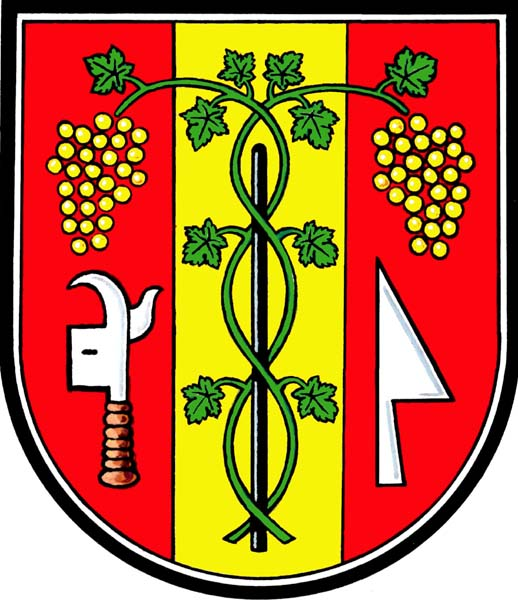
- Flag Coat of arms

- Location in the Czech Republic
- Coordinates: 48°50′58″N 16°53′32″E
- Country: Czech Republic
- Region: South Moravian
- District: Břeclav
- First mentioned: 1306

Government
  - Mayor: Lenka Grofová

Area
  - Total: 25.73 km^{2} (9.93 sq mi)
- Elevation: 176 m (577 ft)

Population (2026-01-01)
  - Total: 3,862
  - Density: 150.1/km^{2} (388.7/sq mi)
- Time zone: UTC+1 (CET)
  - Summer (DST): UTC+2 (CEST)
- Postal code: 691 02
- Website: www.velkebilovice.cz

Velké Bílovice (Czech pronunciation: [ˈvɛlkɛː ˈbiːlovɪtsɛ]; German: Groß Billowitz) is a town in Břeclav District in the South Moravian Region of the Czech Republic. It has about 3,900 inhabitants. The town is located on the Prušánka Stream, on the border between the Lower Morava Valley and Kyjov Hills.

Velké Bílovice and its surroundings is known for viticulture and winemaking.

== Etymology ==
The name Bílovice was derived either from the personal name Biela/Bíla, who could be the founder of the settlement, or from the name of the first documented owner of the village, Sigfried Sirotek, by mistranslating his name (Czech word sirotek = 'orphan', in German waise; but German weisse means 'white' = bílý in Czech). The prefix Velké means 'great'.

== Geography ==
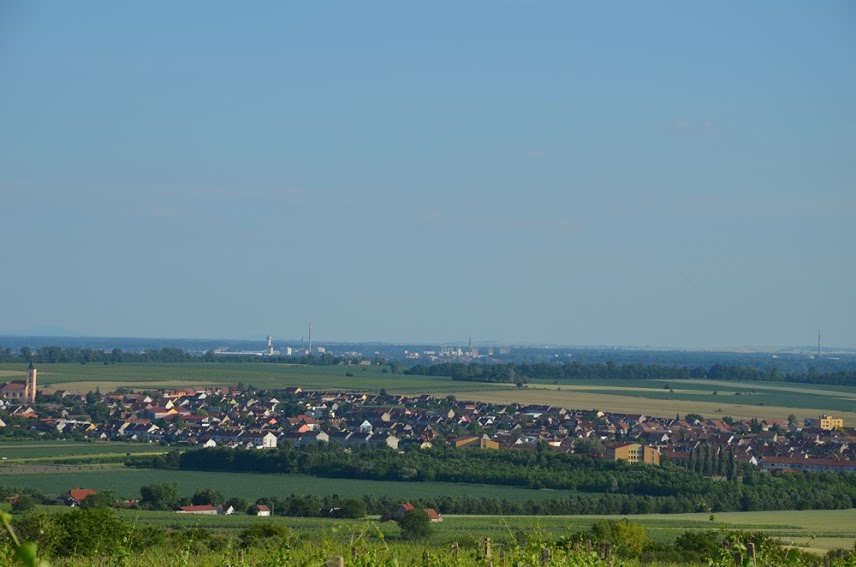
Velké Bílovice viewed from the hill Zímarky

Velké Bílovice is located about 9 kilometres (6 mi) north of Břeclav and 45 km (28 mi) southeast of Brno. The southern half of the municipal territory with the town proper lies in the Lower Morava Valley. The northern half lies in the Kyjov Hills and includes the highest point of Velké Bílovice, the hill Zímarky at 264 m (866 ft) above sea level.

The Prušánka Stream flows through the municipal territory. There are two fishponds: Velký Bílovec and Šísary.

== History ==
The first written record of Velké Bílovice comes from 1306 but the area was settled much earlier. The noble families of Liechtenstein and Zierotin were the most important owners in the history of Velké Bílovice. In the 16th century, group of Hutterites settled in the area, cultivated grapevine and built many large wine cellars.

At the beginning of the 20th century, many citizens of Velké Bílovice migrated to Argentina, Canada and the United States.

Velké Bílovice was promoted to a town in 2001. However, due to agriculture and wine growing, it still retains its village character.

== Demographics ==
Historical population

Year	Pop.	±%
1869	1,977	—
1880	2,285	+15.6%
1890	2,570	+12.5%
1900	2,764	+7.5%
1910	2,881	+4.2%

Year	Pop.	±%
1921	3,140	+9.0%
1930	3,138	−0.1%
1950	3,206	+2.2%
1961	3,623	+13.0%
1970	3,669	+1.3%

Year	Pop.	±%
1980	3,903	+6.4%
1991	3,811	−2.4%
2001	3,800	−0.3%
2011	3,852	+1.4%
2021	3,777	−1.9%

Source: Censuses

== Economy ==
Velké Bílovice is known for viticulture and winemaking. It lies in the Velkopavlovická wine subregion. The town boasts more than 650 privately owned wine cellars located in 40 named cellar streets and more than 760 hectares (1,900 acres) of officially registered vineyards. This area makes it the largest grapevine-growing town in the country.

== Transport ==
The D2 motorway from Brno to Břeslav runs along the western municipal border.

== Culture ==
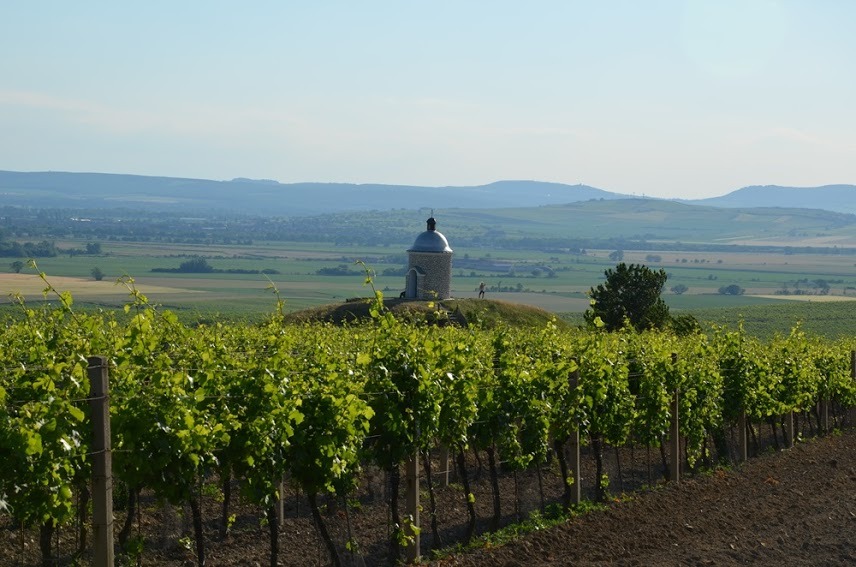
Chapel on the hill Zímarky surrounded by vineyards

Hody ('the feasts') is the most important folk festival in Velké Bílovice. It begins on the first Sunday after the Day of the Virgin Mary's Birth (8 September), patron saint of the local church, and continues till Tuesday. On the Saturday before the Feasts festive maypole is manually erected. The main celebration takes place on Sunday, when many visitors even from far away come to admire the folk costume parade, which is annually attended by more than 50 costumed couples.

"From wine cellar to wine cellar" is a traditional cultural event, consisting of walking around wine cellars and tasting plenty of different varieties of wines from many different winemakers. It is regularly held on Saturday at the turn of March and April.

"Wine exhibition" is a traditional social event since 1965. In the town's Culture House, 600 to 900 wine samples of local winemakers and winemakers from the surrounding villages, especially from the Velkopavlovická wine-growing sub-region, are exhibited. It is held at the turn of April and May.

== Sights ==
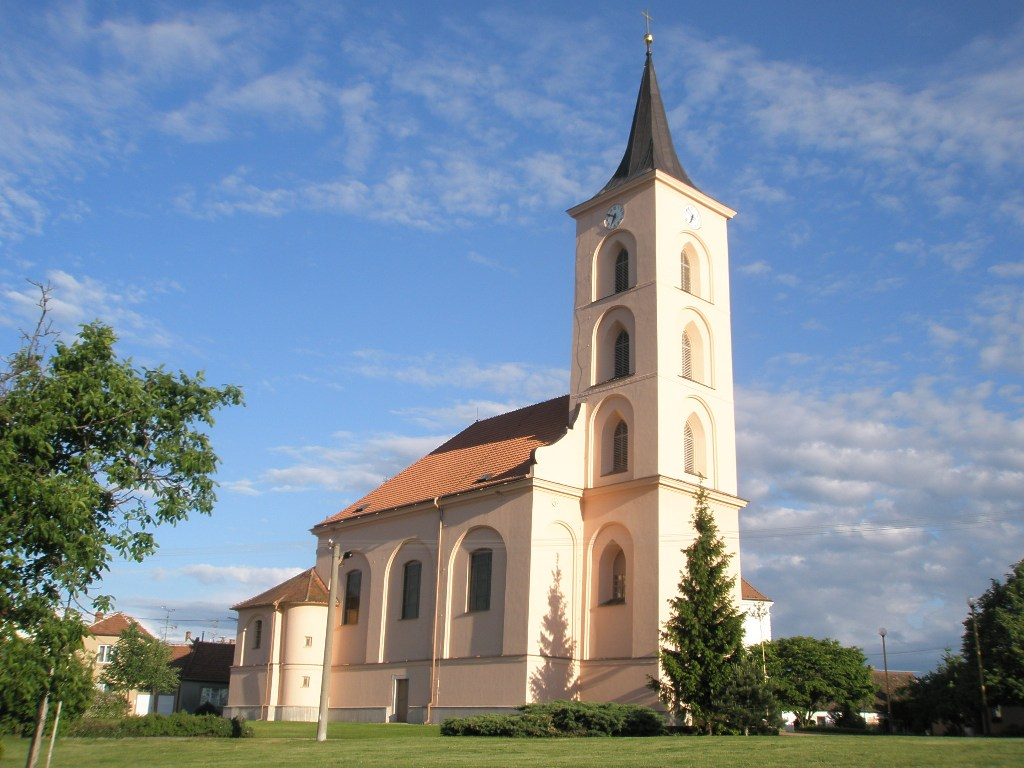
Church of the Nativity of the Virgin Mary

A notable feature of Velké Bílovice are the Hutterite wine cellars. The largest one was built around 1614. Its current owner is the company Habánské sklepy.

Town Museum is a museum with local folk costumes, many archaeological finds from the area, old farm tools and other things associated with the history of the town.

The hill Zímarky is a distinctive landscape element with an excellent outlook. On the hilltop there is a chapel which is consecrated to four saints: Saint Urban (patron saint of winemakers), Saint Wenceslaus (patron saint of the Czech lands) and Saints Cyril and Methodius (patrons saints of Christianity in the Czech lands).

The Church of the Nativity of the Virgin Mary was built in the late Baroque style in 1764–1765.

== Twin towns – sister cities ==
Velké Bílovice is twinned with:

- Presidencia Roque Sáenz Peña, Argentina
- Šenkvice, Slovakia
