= Kout =

Kout may refer to:

- KOUT, radio station in Rapid City, South Dakota

== People with the surname ==
- Jiří Kout, Czech conductor

== See also ==
- Phou Kout District, a district of Xiangkhouang Province, northern-central Laos
- Přední kout, small hill in the South Moravia, Czech Republic
- Kout na Šumavě, village and municipality in Domažlice District, Plzeň Region, Czech Republic
- Kouts (disambiguation)
