= Trkmanka =

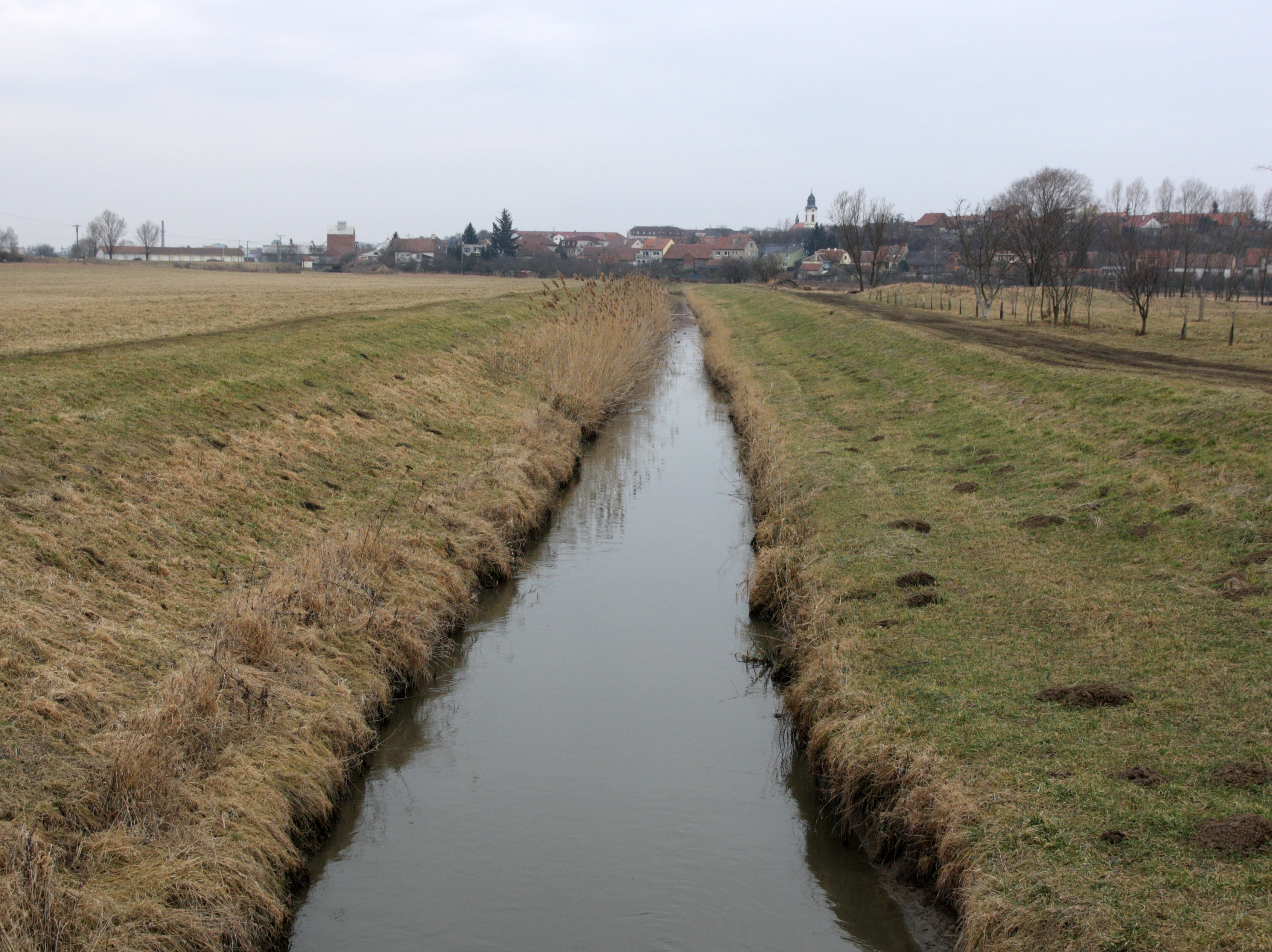
- The Trkmanka in Velké Pavlovice

Location
- Country: Czech Republic
- Region: South Moravian

Physical characteristics
- Source
  - location: Ždánice, Ždánice Forest
  - coordinates: 49°5′9″N 17°0′28″E
  - elevation: 249 m (817 ft)
- Mouth
  - location: Thaya
  - coordinates: 48°48′51″N 16°50′1″E
  - elevation: 152 m (499 ft)
- Length: 41.7 km (25.9 mi)
- Basin size: 363.3 km^{2} (140.3 sq mi)
- Discharge
  - average: 0.33 m^{3}/s (12 cu ft/s) in Velké Pavlovice

Basin features
- Progression: Thaya→ Morava→ Danube→ Black Sea

The Trkmanka is a river in the Czech Republic, a left tributary of the Thaya River. It flows through the South Moravian Region. It is 41.7 km (25.9 mi) long.

== Characteristic ==
The Trkmanka originates in the territory of Ždánice in the Ždánice Forest range at an elevation of 249 m (817 ft) and flows to Podivín, where it enters the Thaya River at an elevation of 152 m (499 ft). It is 41.7 km (25.9 mi) long. Its drainage basin has an area of 363.3 km^{2} (140.3 sq mi). The average discharge at 11.2 river km in Velké Pavlovice is 0.33 m^{3}/s (12 cu ft/s).

The longest tributaries of the Trkmanka are:

Tributary	Length (km)	Side
Spálený potok	19.0	right
Lovčický potok	10.1	left
Trníček	8.8	right
Čejčský potok	7.4	left

== Course ==
The river flows through the municipal territories of Ždánice, Dražůvky, Želetice, Násedlovice, Terezín, Krumvíř, Kobylí, Bořetice, Velké Pavlovice, Rakvice and Podivín.

== Bodies of water ==
There are 89 bodies of water in the basin area. The largest of them are the fishponds Balaton and Jezero, both with an area of 4.5 ha (11 acres).

== See also ==
- List of rivers of the Czech Republic
