= Ždánice (Hodonín District) =

- Town
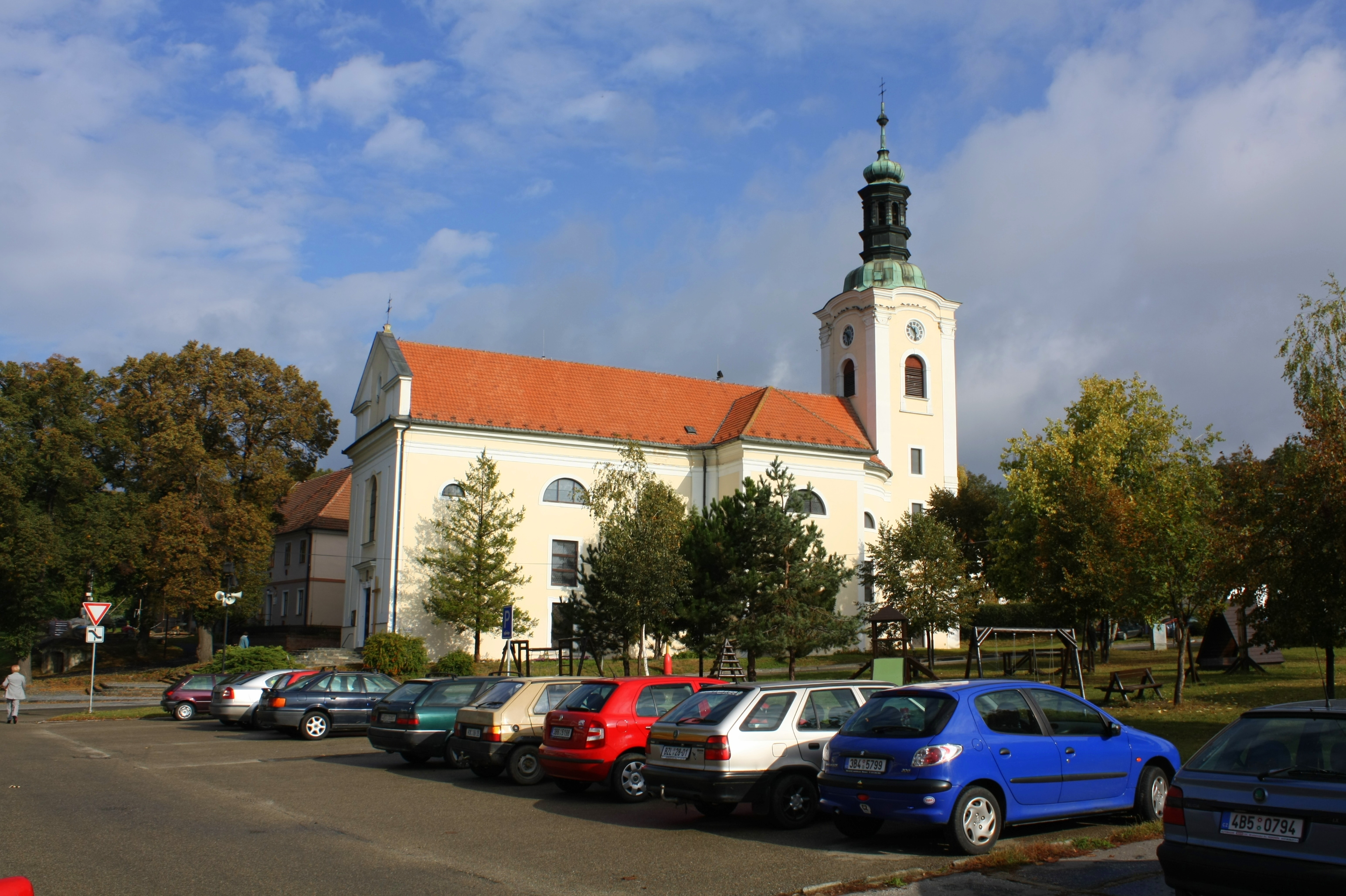
- Church of the Assumption of the Virgin Mary

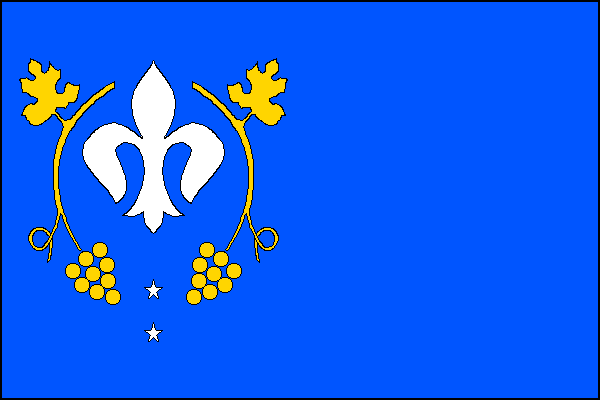
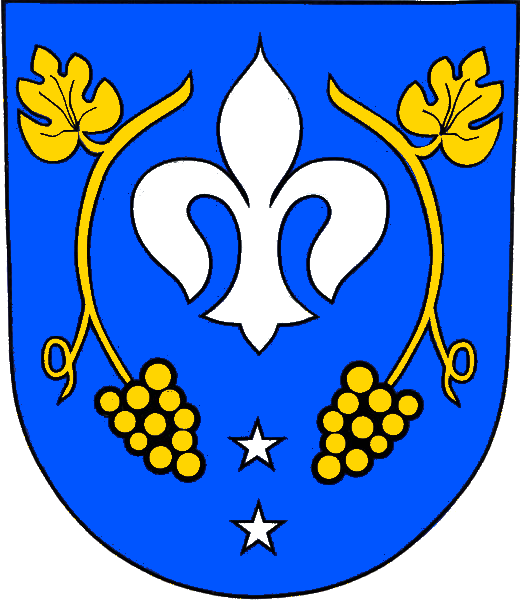
- Flag Coat of arms

- Location in the Czech Republic
- Coordinates: 49°4′2″N 17°1′39″E
- Country: Czech Republic
- Region: South Moravian
- District: Hodonín
- First mentioned: 1349

Government
  - Mayor: Vladimír Okáč

Area
  - Total: 20.81 km^{2} (8.03 sq mi)
- Elevation: 226 m (741 ft)

Population (2026-01-01)
  - Total: 2,549
  - Density: 122.5/km^{2} (317.2/sq mi)
- Time zone: UTC+1 (CET)
  - Summer (DST): UTC+2 (CEST)
- Postal code: 696 32
- Website: www.muzdanice.cz

Ždánice (Czech pronunciation: [ˈʒdaːɲɪtsɛ]; German: Steinitz) is a town in Hodonín District in the South Moravian Region of the Czech Republic. It has about 2,500 inhabitants.

== Geography ==
Ždánice is located about 23 kilometres (14 mi) north of Hodonín and 31 km (19 mi) southeast of Brno. It lies mostly in the Ždánice Forest, only a small southern part on the municipal territory extends into the Kyjov Hills. The highest point is the hill U Slepice at 439 m (1,440 ft) above sea level. The Trkmanka River originates in the western part of the municipal territory and then flows through the town proper.

== History ==
The first written mention of Ždánice is from 1349, when there already were a castle, mills, vineyards and pastures. The town was damaged during the Thirty Years' War. From 1622, Ždánice was owned by the Liechtenstein family.

== Demographics ==
Historical population

Year	Pop.	±%
1869	2,172	—
1880	2,244	+3.3%
1890	2,127	−5.2%
1900	2,184	+2.7%
1910	2,358	+8.0%

Year	Pop.	±%
1921	2,421	+2.7%
1930	2,157	−10.9%
1950	2,284	+5.9%
1961	2,630	+15.1%
1970	2,666	+1.4%

Year	Pop.	±%
1980	2,761	+3.6%
1991	2,757	−0.1%
2001	2,742	−0.5%
2011	2,559	−6.7%
2021	2,455	−4.1%

Source: Censuses

== Transport ==
There are no railways or major roads running through the town. The I/54 road, which connects the D1 motorway with Kyjov and further continues to the Czech–Slovak border, runs along the southern municipal border.

== Sights ==
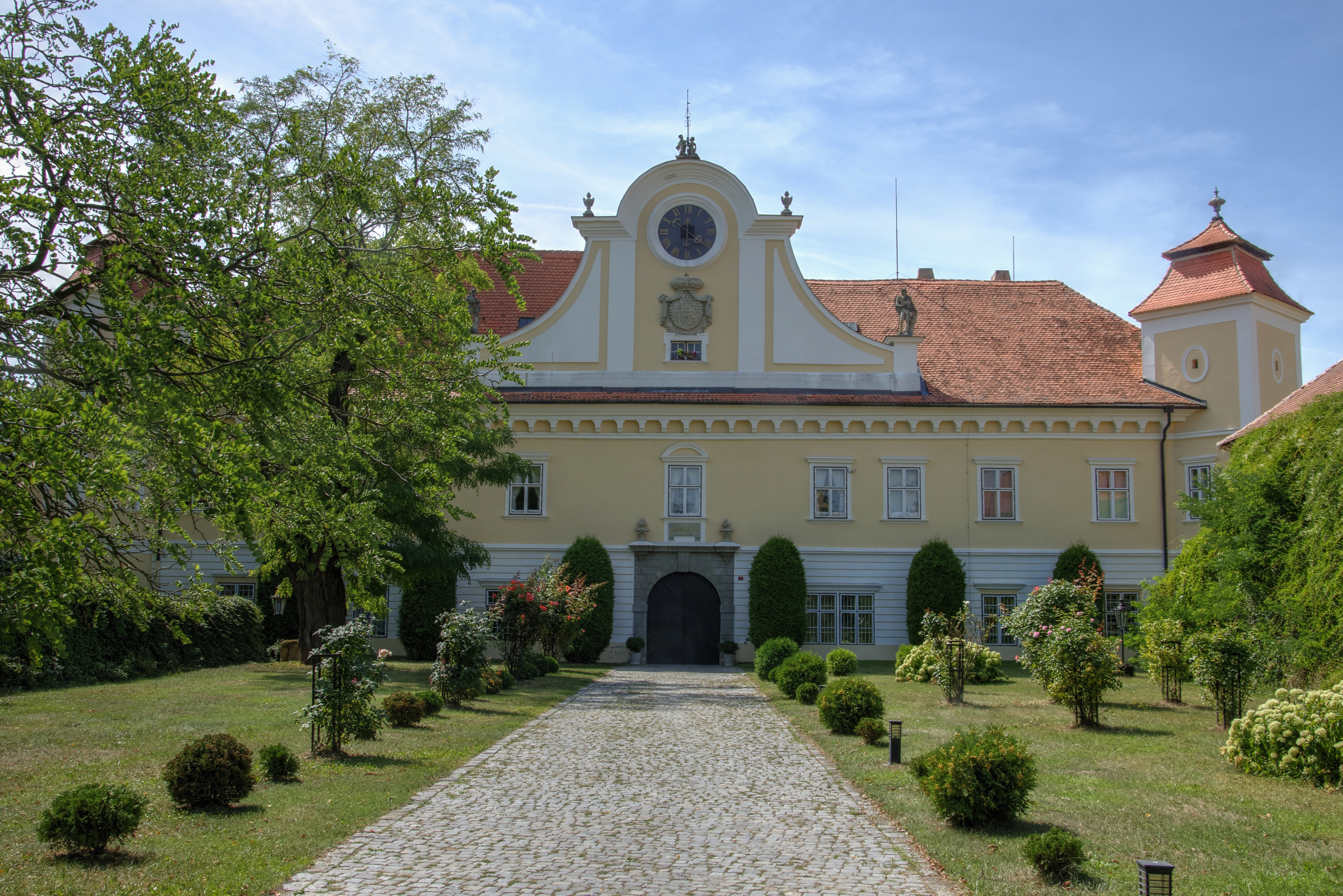
Ždánice Castle

The Church of the Assumption of the Virgin Mary is an early Baroque building with later modifications. It dates from around 1700.

The Ždánice Castle was built in the Renaissance style in 1569 on the site of an old fortress. In 1762 and 1789, it was rebuilt in the Baroque style to its current form. The castle is surrounded by a park. Today the castle houses the Vrbas Museum. It is a regional museum founded by local teacher and historian Jakub Vrbas.
