= Lower Morava Valley =

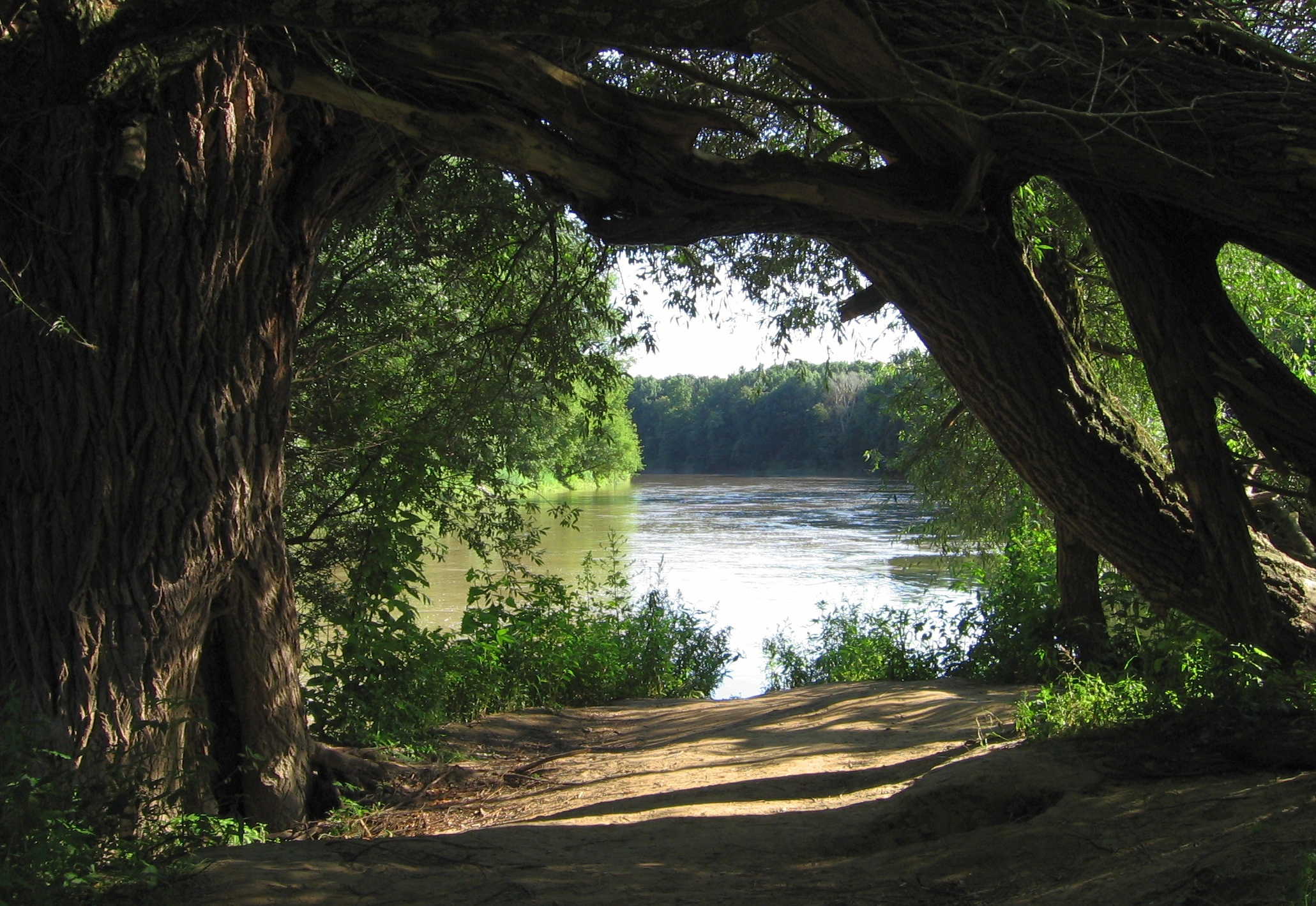
- Morava–Thaya confluence

Highest point
- Peak: Žerotín
- Elevation: 322 m n.m.

Dimensions
- Length: 83 km (52 mi)
- Area: 1,452 km^{2} (561 mi^{2})

Geography
- Location within Czech Republic
- Countries: Czech Republic, Slovakia
- Range coordinates: 48°50′N 17°07′E
- Parent range: Carpathians

Geology
- Orogeny: Alpide belt
- Rock age: Neogene
- Rock type(s): Gravel and sand

The Lower Morava Valley (Czech: Dolnomoravský úval, Jihomoravská pánev; Slovak: Dolnomoravský úval; German: Nieder March Talsenke) is a geomorphological formation (special type of valley) in the Czech Republic and Slovakia.

It is formed by the depression in the Western Carpathians (Ždánice Forest, Kyjov Hills and Mikulov Hills) in the west and Bílé Karpaty and Chvojnice Hills in the east. The drainage to the Morava River of the Danube basin runs finally to the Black Sea.

It includes the low watershed of the Dyje-Morava in Lanžhot.

== Geography ==
The Lower Morava Valley is a nordest part of the Vienna Basin (Western Carpathians) and the corridor to Napajedla Gate, Upper Morava Valley, Moravian Gate and later in the final goal, the North European Plain (Poland- Lower Silesia – Galicia) since ancient times. Here ran one arm of the most important trade routes from southern Europe to the Baltic Sea (e.g. the Amber Road – eastern branch) and also routes from Moravia to Upper Silesia and Lesser Poland. The Emperor Ferdinand Northern Railway (one part) built in 1840–41 from Břeclav (Vienna) to Přerov also traversed the Lower Morava Valley.

The Morava and Thaya rivers, Myjava (river), Chvojnice, Trkmanka, Kyjovka as well among others, finish here in their floodplains.

The largest towns in Lower Morava Valley are Břeclav, Hodonín, Uherské Hradiště, Staré Město, Dubňany, and Strážnice.

Soil horizon – mainly sand, fluvisol and loess, partly chernozem.

== Gallery ==
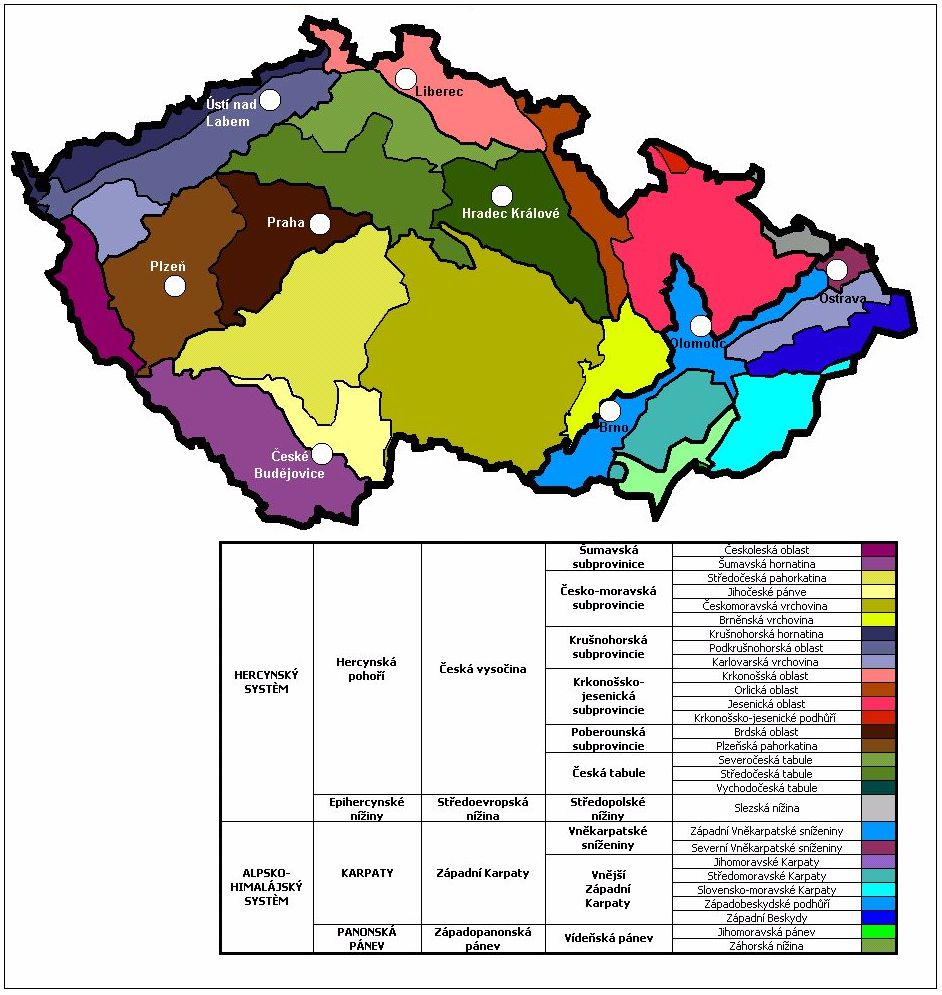
Lower Morava Valley (olive green) down right

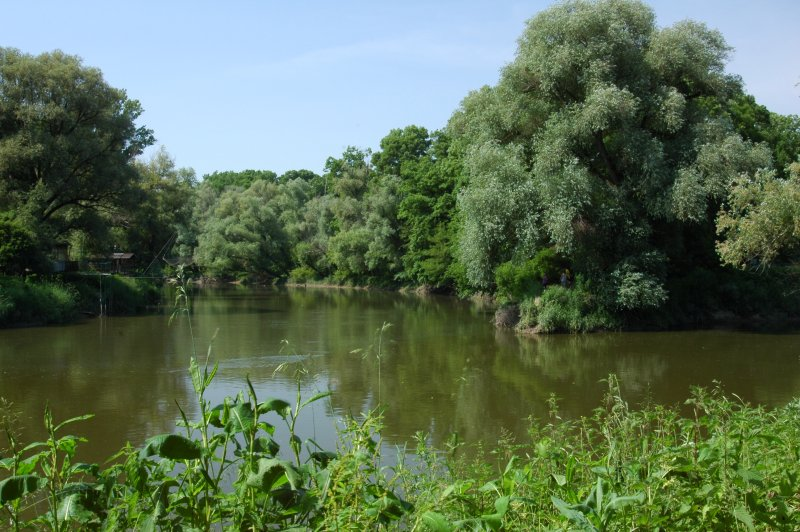
Riparian forest by the Morava–Thaya confluence

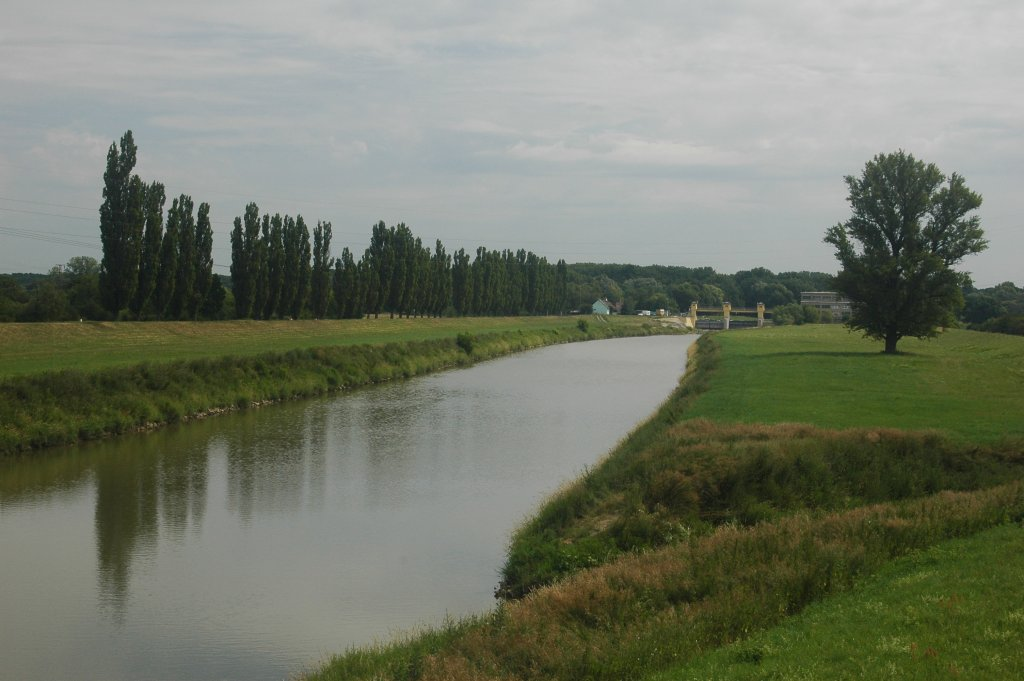
Lower Morava Valley landscape Hodonín surrounding

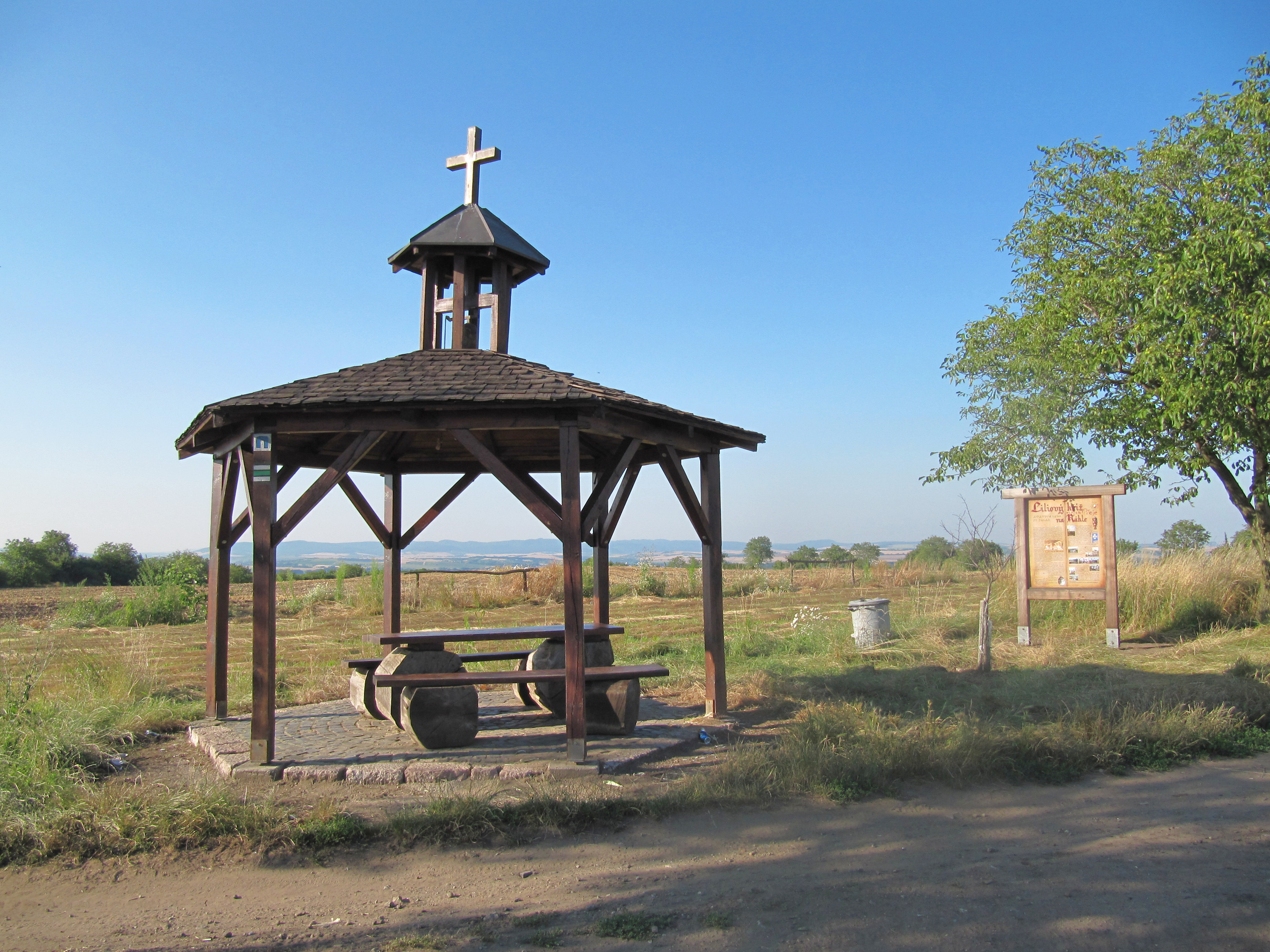
View from Náklo Hill (265 m) to the Lower Morava Valley landscape

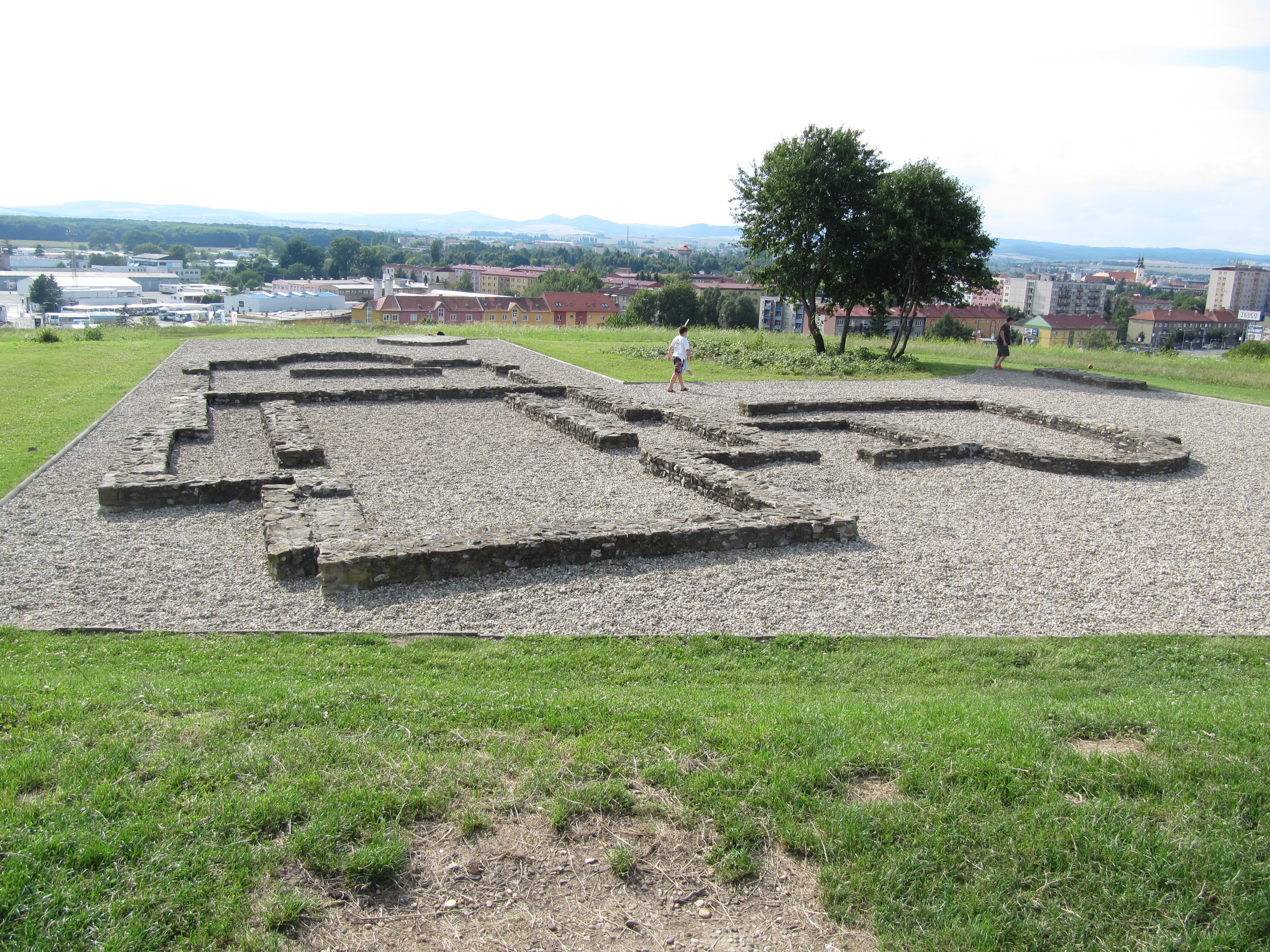
View of the Lower Morava Valley from the Sady archaeological site

== See also ==
- Vyškov Gate
- Outer Subcarpathia
- South-Moravian Carpathians
- Upper Morava Valley
- Dyje–Svratka Valley
