= Dambořice oil field =

Oil field in Dambořice, Czech Republic

- Location within Czech Republic
- Country: Czech Republic
- Region: South Moravian Region
- Location: Dambořice
- Offshore/onshore: onshore
- Coordinates: 49°1′10″N 16°55′3″E
- Operator: Unipetrol

Production
- Current production of oil: 4,700 barrels per day (~2.3×10^{5} t/a)
- Estimated oil in place: 15 million barrels (~2.0×10^{6} t)
- Estimated gas in place: 490×10^{6} m^{3} 14.25×10^{9} cu ft

The Dambořice oil field is an oil field located in Dambořice, Hodonín District, South Moravian Region. It was discovered in 1995 and developed by Unipetrol. It began production in 1996 and produces oil. The total proven reserves of the Dambořice oil field are around 15 million barrels (2.2 million tonnes), and production is centered on 4,700 barrels per day (750 m^{3}/d).

== See also ==
- Energy in the Czech Republic
