= Kouts =

Kouts may refer to:

- Kouts (surname)
- Kouts, Indiana, town in Pleasant Township, Porter County, Indiana

== See also ==
- Kout (disambiguation)
