= Kurdějov =

- Municipality
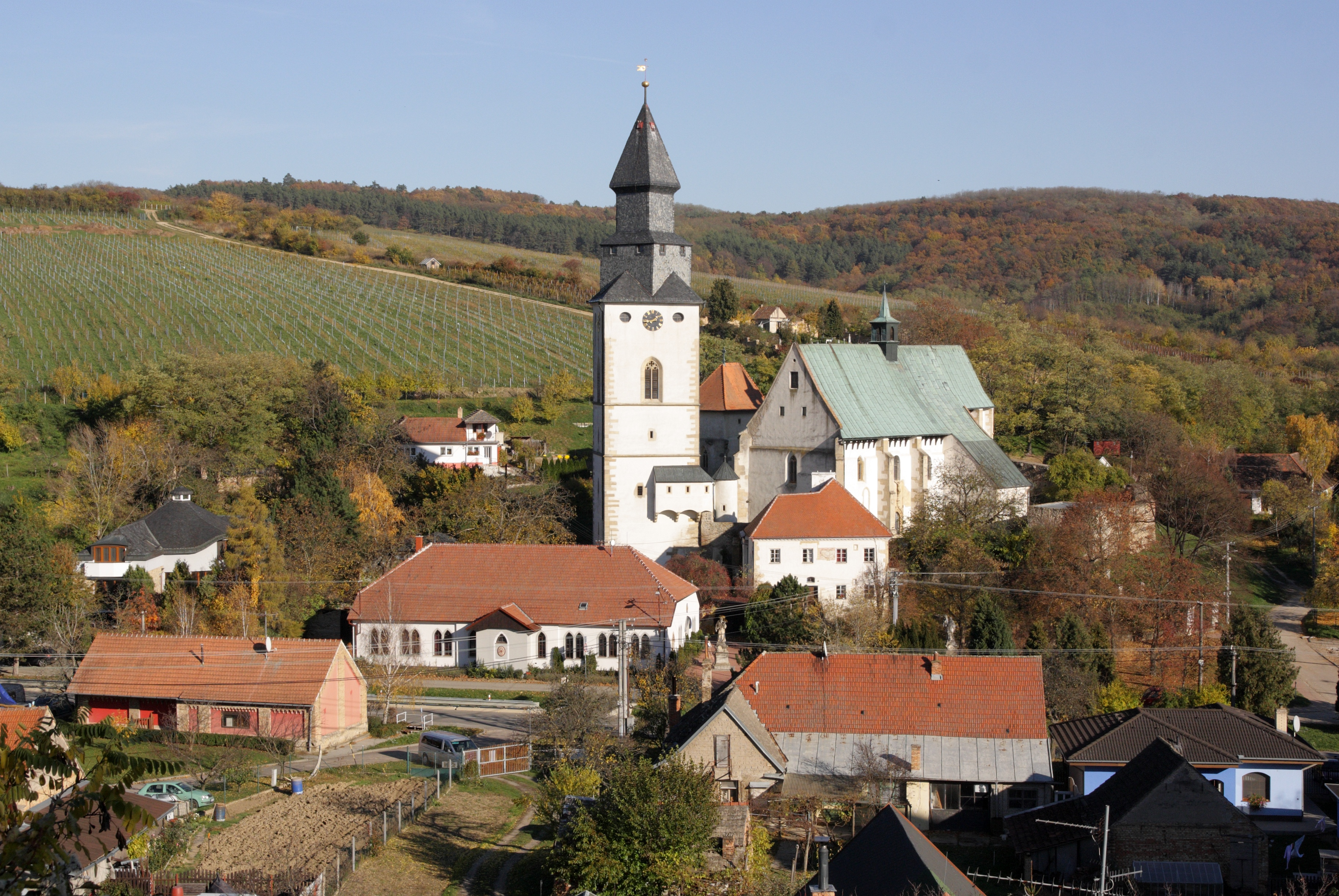
- Church of Saint John the Baptist

- Flag Coat of arms

- Location in the Czech Republic
- Coordinates: 48°57′28″N 16°45′48″E
- Country: Czech Republic
- Region: South Moravian
- District: Břeclav
- First mentioned: 1286

Area
  - Total: 9.26 km^{2} (3.58 sq mi)
- Elevation: 236 m (774 ft)

Population (2026-01-01)
  - Total: 462
  - Density: 49.9/km^{2} (129/sq mi)
- Time zone: UTC+1 (CET)
  - Summer (DST): UTC+2 (CEST)
- Postal code: 693 01
- Website: www.obec-kurdejov.cz

Kurdějov (German: Gurdau) is a municipality and village in Břeclav District in the South Moravian Region of the Czech Republic. It has about 500 inhabitants.

== Geography ==
Kurdějov is located about 23 kilometres (14 mi) north of Břeclav and 27 km (17 mi) south of Brno. It lies in the Ždánice Forest range. The highest point is the hill Holý vrch at 401 m (1,316 ft) above sea level.

== History ==
The first written mention of Kurdějov is from 1286. From the early 14th century to 1594, the village was owned by the Lords of Lipá. In the 14th century, Anabaptists settled in the village.

== Demographics ==
Historical population

Year	Pop.	±%
1869	978	—
1880	1,060	+8.4%
1890	1,010	−4.7%
1900	993	−1.7%
1910	945	−4.8%

Year	Pop.	±%
1921	916	−3.1%
1930	965	+5.3%
1950	524	−45.7%
1961	412	−21.4%
1970	370	−10.2%

Year	Pop.	±%
1980	347	−6.2%
1991	298	−14.1%
2001	347	+16.4%
2011	381	+9.8%
2021	435	+14.2%

Source: Censuses

== Transport ==
There are no railways or major roads passing through the municipality.

== Sights ==
The main landmark of Kurdějov is the Church of Saint John the Baptist. It was built at the turn of the 13th and 14th centuries. A hundred years later it was fortified. A system of underground passages leads from the church to the surroundings.
