= Kouts (surname) =

Kouts is a surname. Notable people with the surname include:

- Herbert J.C. Kouts (1919–2008), American nuclear physicist and engineer
- Tarmo Kõuts, Estonian politician and military commander
- William Walter Kouts (born 1922), United States Army officer

== See also ==
- Kouts (disambiguation)
