= Dambořice =

- Municipality
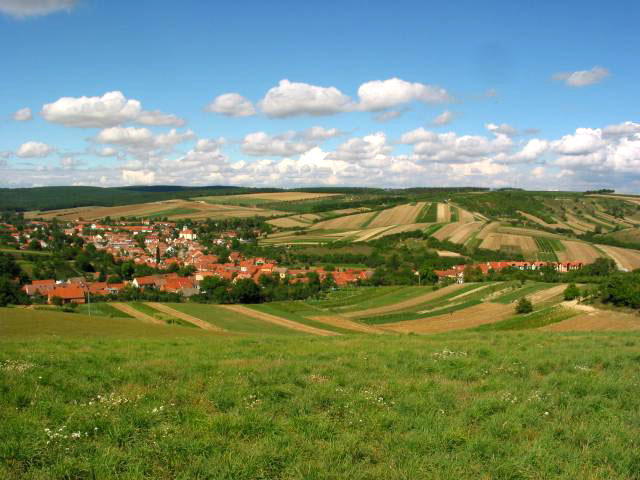
- General view of Dambořice

- Flag Coat of arms

- Location in the Czech Republic
- Coordinates: 49°2′18″N 16°55′3″E
- Country: Czech Republic
- Region: South Moravian
- District: Hodonín
- First mentioned: 1141

Area
  - Total: 23.17 km^{2} (8.95 sq mi)
- Elevation: 224 m (735 ft)

Population (2026-01-01)
  - Total: 1,566
  - Density: 67.59/km^{2} (175.1/sq mi)
- Time zone: UTC+1 (CET)
  - Summer (DST): UTC+2 (CEST)
- Postal code: 696 35
- Website: www.damborice.cz

Dambořice is a municipality and village in Hodonín District in the South Moravian Region of the Czech Republic. It has about 1,600 inhabitants.

== Geography ==
Dambořice is located about 25 kilometres (16 mi) northwest of Hodonín and 27 km (17 mi) southeast of Brno. It lies in a hilly landscape in the Ždánice Forest range. The highest point is at 402 m (1,319 ft) above sea level.

== History ==
The first written mention of Dambořice is from 1141. In 1531, the village was acquired by Jan Kuna of Kunštát. He restored the brewery, established fishponds and supported viticulture, and the village prospered. As a result, in 1534, Dambořice was promoted to a market town by Ferdinand I. In 1550, Anabaptists settled in the village. The economic prosperity was supported by the establishment of a Jewish community at the end of the 16th century, which lasted until the 20th century. After World War II, Dambořice lost the market town title.

== Demographics ==
Historical population

Year	Pop.	±%
1869	2,010	—
1880	2,024	+0.7%
1890	1,982	−2.1%
1900	2,033	+2.6%
1910	2,112	+3.9%

Year	Pop.	±%
1921	2,114	+0.1%
1930	2,100	−0.7%
1950	1,892	−9.9%
1961	1,882	−0.5%
1970	1,615	−14.2%

Year	Pop.	±%
1980	1,453	−10.0%
1991	1,240	−14.7%
2001	1,251	+0.9%
2011	1,309	+4.6%
2021	1,414	+8.0%

Source: Censuses

== Economy ==
Dambořice is known for the Dambořice oil field. It produces about 55% of the country's oil production.

== Transport ==
The I/54 road (the section that connects Kyjov with the D1 motorway) runs along the northeastern municipal border.

== Sights ==
The main landmark of Dambořice is the Church of Saint Martin. The original church was first mentioned in 1326. In 1780, it was replaced by the current Baroque church. In 1909–1910, it was reconstructed to its present form.

The second historical monument is the Jewish cemetery. It was founded at the beginning of the 17th century and used until 1940. The oldest preserved tombstones are from around 1700.
