= Násedlovice =

- Municipality
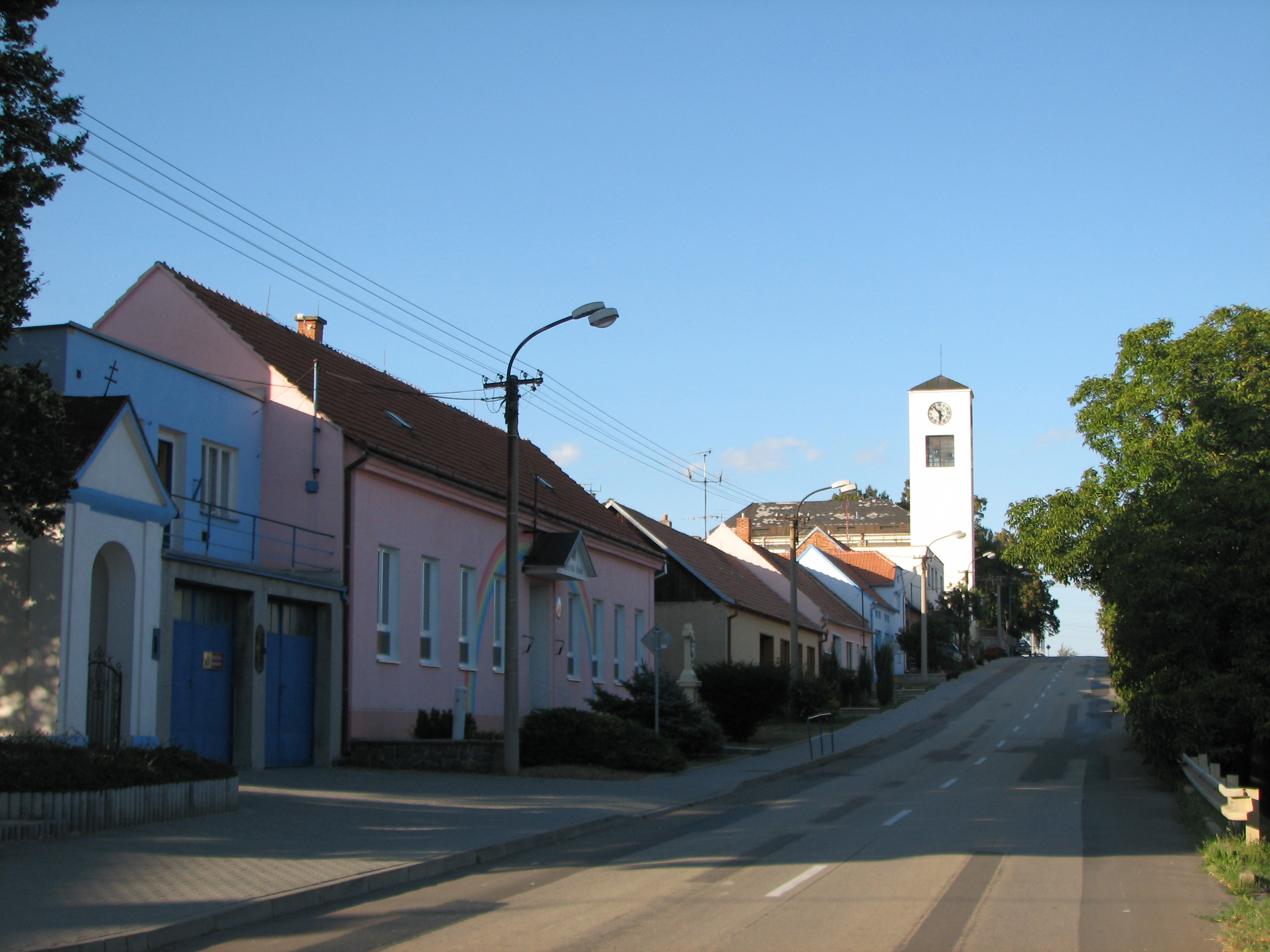
- Main street

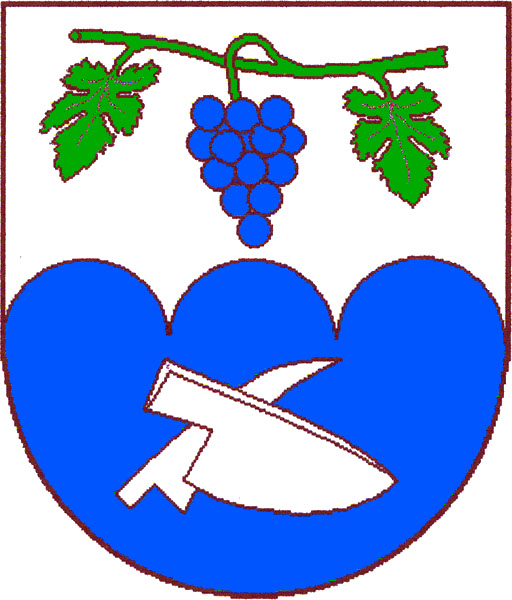
- Flag Coat of arms

- Location in the Czech Republic
- Coordinates: 49°0′44″N 16°57′37″E
- Country: Czech Republic
- Region: South Moravian
- District: Hodonín
- First mentioned: 1327

Area
  - Total: 13.08 km^{2} (5.05 sq mi)
- Elevation: 230 m (750 ft)

Population (2026-01-01)
  - Total: 847
  - Density: 64.8/km^{2} (168/sq mi)
- Time zone: UTC+1 (CET)
  - Summer (DST): UTC+2 (CEST)
- Postal code: 696 36
- Website: obecnasedlovice.cz

Násedlovice is a municipality and village in Hodonín District in the South Moravian Region of the Czech Republic. It has about 800 inhabitants.

Násedlovice lies approximately 22 kilometres (14 mi) north-west of Hodonín, 34 km (21 mi) south-east of Brno, and 220 km (140 mi) south-east of Prague.

== History ==
The first written mention of Násedlovice is from 1327. It was the seat of lower nobles with a fortress and a manor house. The last mention of the fortress in from 1626. From 1565, Násedlovice was owned by the Kaunitz family and joined to the Ždánice estate. After the Battle of White Mountain, their properties were confiscated and the Ždánice estate with Násedlovice was acquired by Maximilian of Liechtenstein.

== Demographics ==
Historical population
Year	Pop.	±%
1869	809	—
1880	939	+16.1%
1890	956	+1.8%
1900	989	+3.5%
1910	1,104	+11.6%
1921	1,225	+11.0%
1930	1,172	−4.3%
1950	1,026	−12.5%
1961	1,078	+5.1%
1970	1,020	−5.4%
1980	899	−11.9%
1991	842	−6.3%
2001	810	−3.8%
2011	824	+1.7%
2021	842	+2.2%
Source: Censuses
