= Staré Město (Uherské Hradiště District) =

- Town
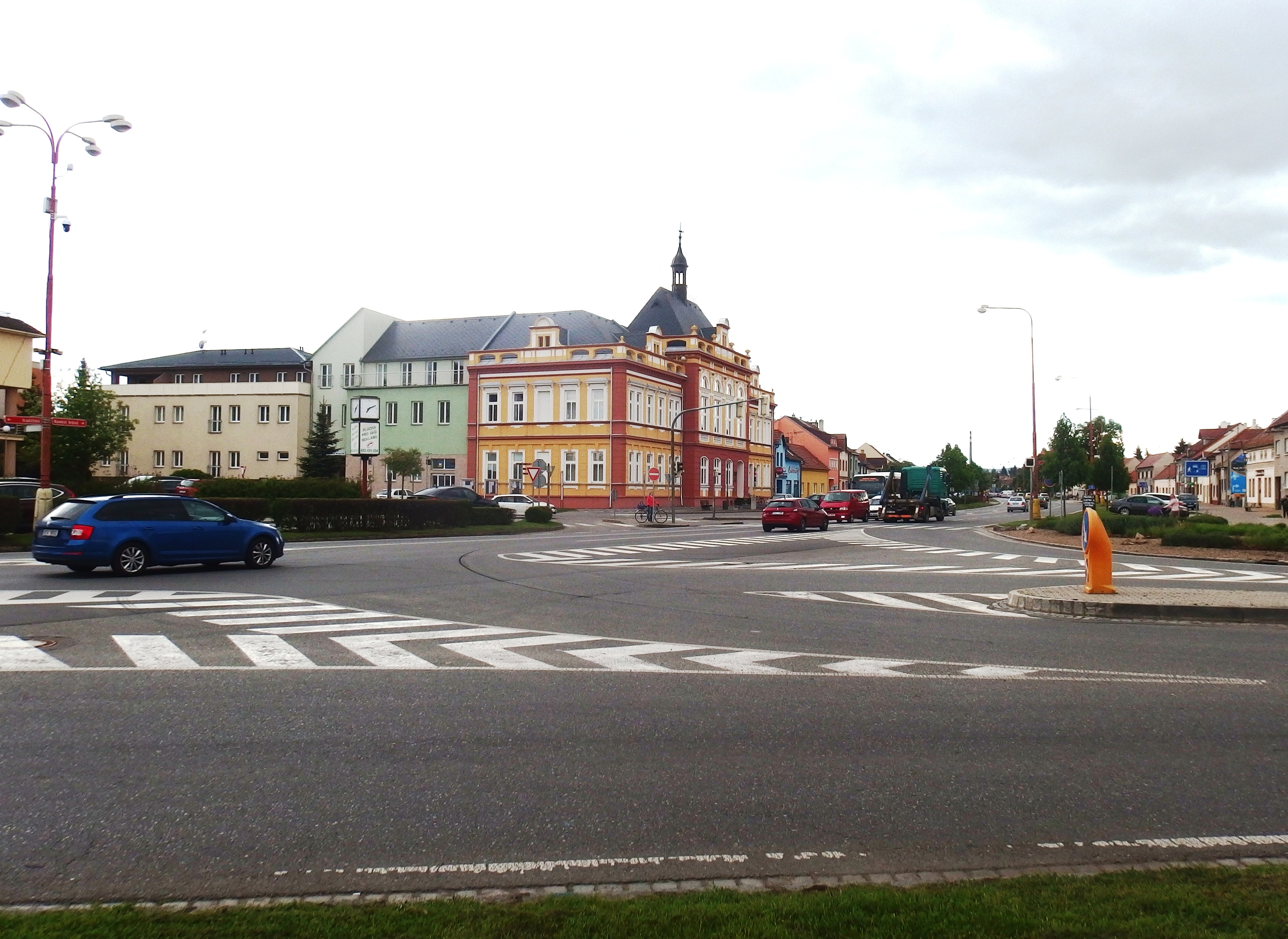
- Main crossroad and town hall

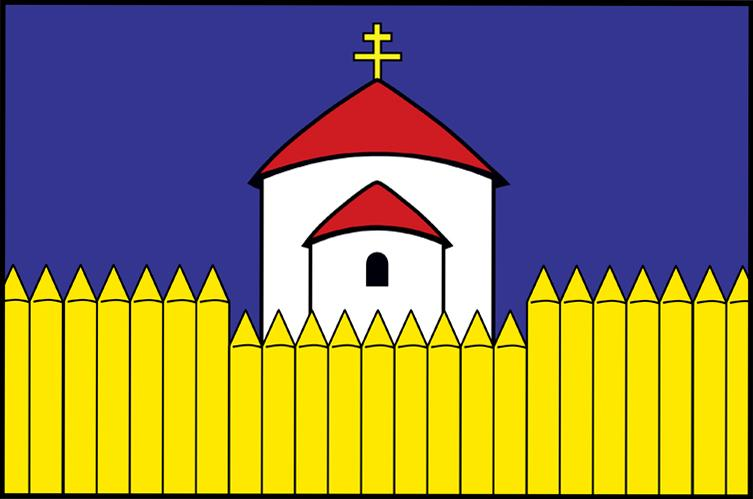
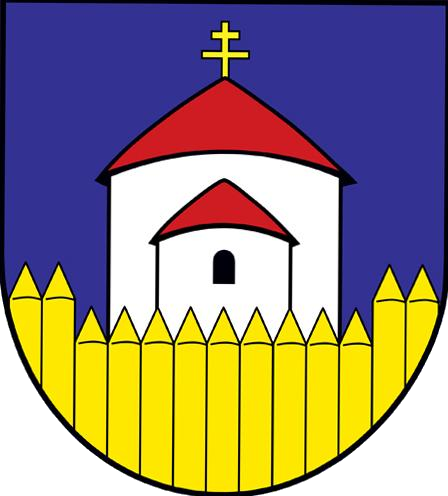
- Flag Coat of arms

- Location in the Czech Republic
- Coordinates: 49°4′38″N 17°26′30″E
- Country: Czech Republic
- Region: Zlín
- District: Uherské Hradiště
- First mentioned: 1141

Government
  - Mayor: Martin Zábranský

Area
  - Total: 20.83 km^{2} (8.04 sq mi)
- Elevation: 205 m (673 ft)

Population (2026-01-01)
  - Total: 6,660
  - Density: 320/km^{2} (828/sq mi)
- Time zone: UTC+1 (CET)
  - Summer (DST): UTC+2 (CEST)
- Postal code: 686 03
- Website: staremesto.uh.cz

Staré Město (Czech pronunciation: [ˈstarɛː ˈmɲɛsto]; in 1950–1996 Staré Město u Uherského Hradiště; German: Altstadt) is a town in Uherské Hradiště District in the Zlín Region of the Czech Republic. It has about 6,700 inhabitants. It lies on the right bank of the Morava River and creates a conurbation with Uherské Hradiště.

The area of Staré Město was inhabited already in the 9th century, during the era of the Great Moravian Empire. Today there is the Great Moravia Monument, which presents the history of the empire and life in it.

== Etymology ==
The name literally means 'old town' in Czech.

== Geography ==
Staré Město is located about 22 kilometres (14 mi) southwest of Zlín and creates a conurbation with Uherské Hradiště. It lies mostly in a flat agricultural landscape of the Lower Morava Valley, but a small western part of the municipal territory also extends into the Kyjov Hills. Staré Město is situated on the right bank of the Morava River, which forms the town's border with Uherské Hradiště. The Baťa Canal flows through the eastern part of the town.

== History ==
In the 9th century, the area of Staré Město was part of Velingrad, one of two capital cities of the Great Moravian Empire. After the fall of Great Moravia, Velingrad lost its importance and became a village with two churches. The first written mention of Velingrad is from 1141. In 1205, the Cistercian monks founded nearby a monastery and named it Velehrad. The market village of Velingrad became their property. The Great Moravian rotunda was rebuilt to the parish Church of Saint Michael the Archangel in 1250. In 1321, Velingrad was renamed Staré Město.

In 1841, the railway was built. From 1971 to 1990, Staré Město was part of Uherské Hradiště. From 1990, it has been a separate municipality. Staré Město was hit by the 1997 Central European flood. In the same year, the municipality was promoted to a town.

== Demographics ==
Historical population

Year	Pop.	±%
1869	2,505	—
1880	2,916	+16.4%
1890	3,264	+11.9%
1900	3,879	+18.8%
1910	4,563	+17.6%

Year	Pop.	±%
1921	5,098	+11.7%
1930	5,544	+8.7%
1950	5,973	+7.7%
1961	6,614	+10.7%
1970	6,245	−5.6%

Year	Pop.	±%
1980	6,183	−1.0%
1991	6,882	+11.3%
2001	6,691	−2.8%
2011	6,693	+0.0%
2021	6,526	−2.5%

Source: Censuses

== Transport ==
The I/55 road (the section from Olomouc to Uherské Hradiště) runs through the town. The I/50 road (part of the European route E50) from Brno to Uherské Hradiště runs through the southern part of the municipal territory.

Staré Město is a railway junction. The town is located on the railway lines Przemyśl–Graz, Prague–Luhačovice and Brno–Olomouc.

== Sights ==
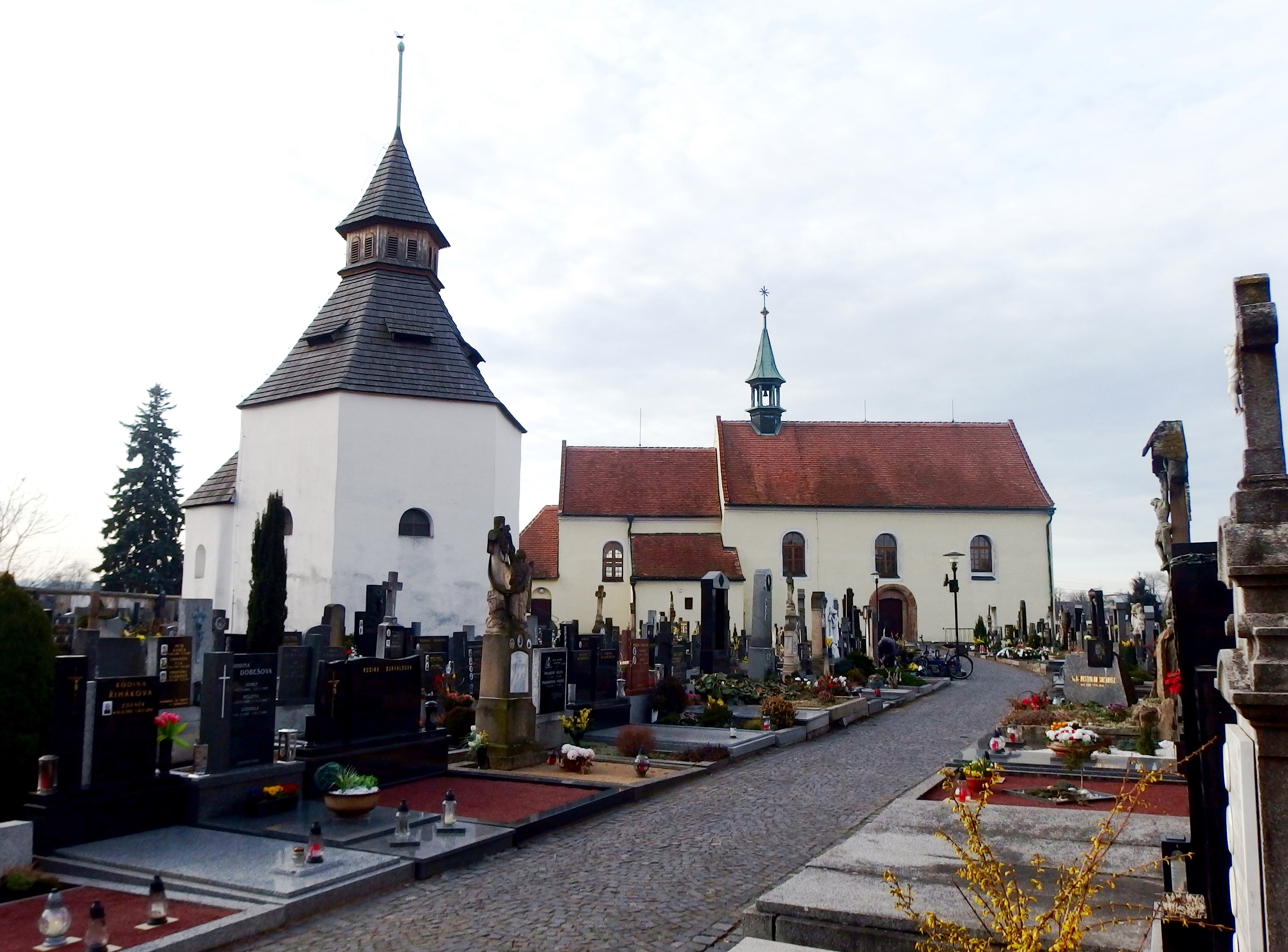
Church of Saint Michael the Archangel

Staré Město is known for the Great Moravia Monument. It was built above the foundations of the first discovered Great Moravian building in Czech territory, which was the church "Na Valách". Great Moravia Monument is a museum with expositions dedicated to the Great Moravian Empire and life in the 9th century.

The Church of Saint Michael the Archangel dates from the first half of the 13th century. Its core contains remnants of a Great Moravian rotunda.

The Church of the Holy Spirit is a modern church from 2002.

Kovozoo is a unique "zoo" with animals and other exhibits created from metal. It is an entertainment complex that also serves for environmental education.

== Notable people ==
- Josef Panáček (1937–2022), sport shooter, Olympic champion
- Miroslav Grebeníček (born 1947), politician

== Twin towns – sister cities ==
Staré Město is twinned with:

- Sées, France
- Tönisvorst, Germany
