= Přední kout =

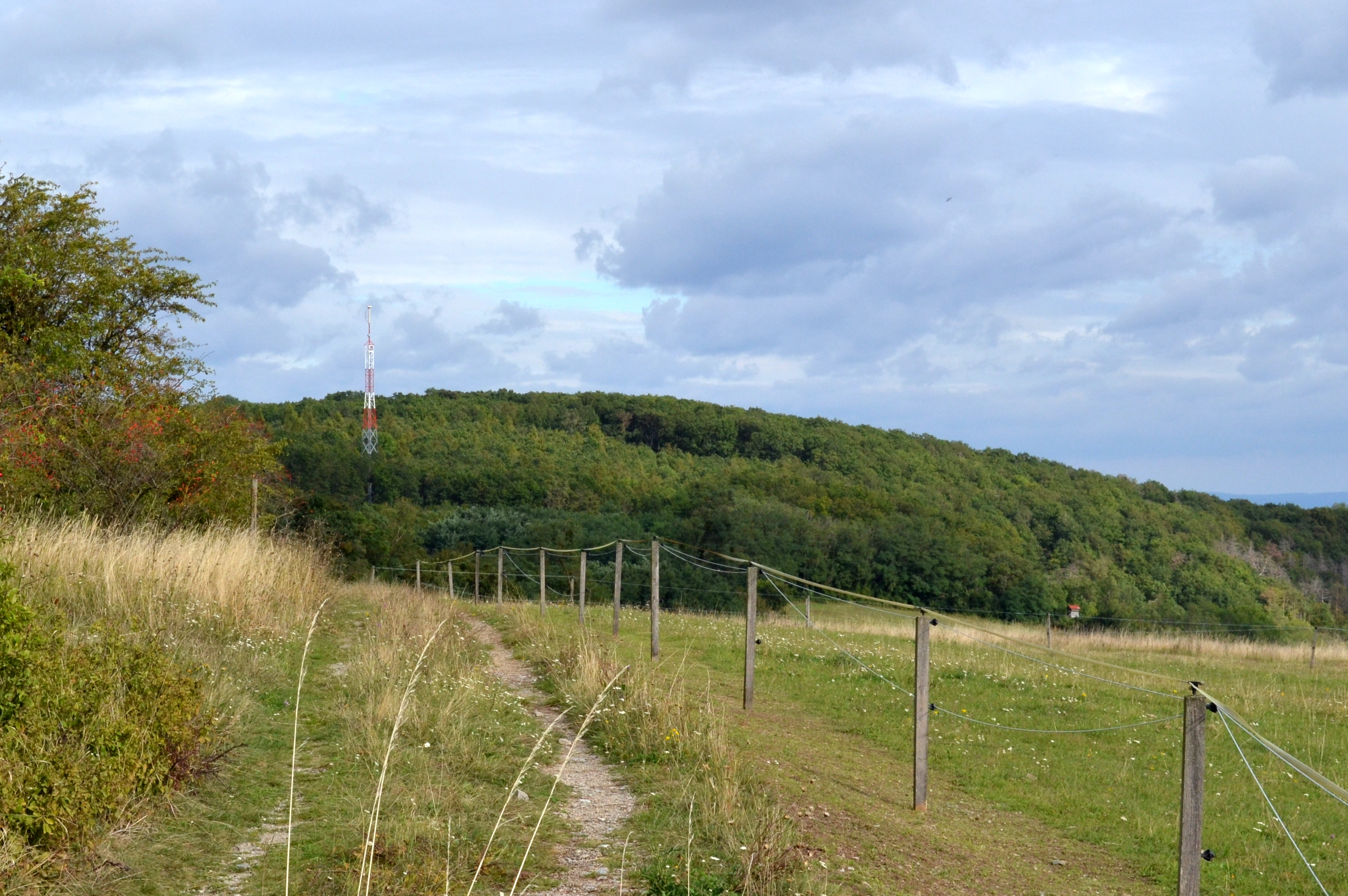
Přední kout hill

Přední kout is a small hill in the South Moravia, Czech Republic. With an altitude of 410 m it is the highest elevation in the hilly landscape around Hustopeče. It is located halfway between the villages of Diváky and Kurdějov and its exact geographic coordinates are 48°58′15″N 16°46′47″E. There is a station of Global Automated System for Frequency Spectrum Monitoring (GASFSM) near its top.
