= Zaječí =

- Municipality
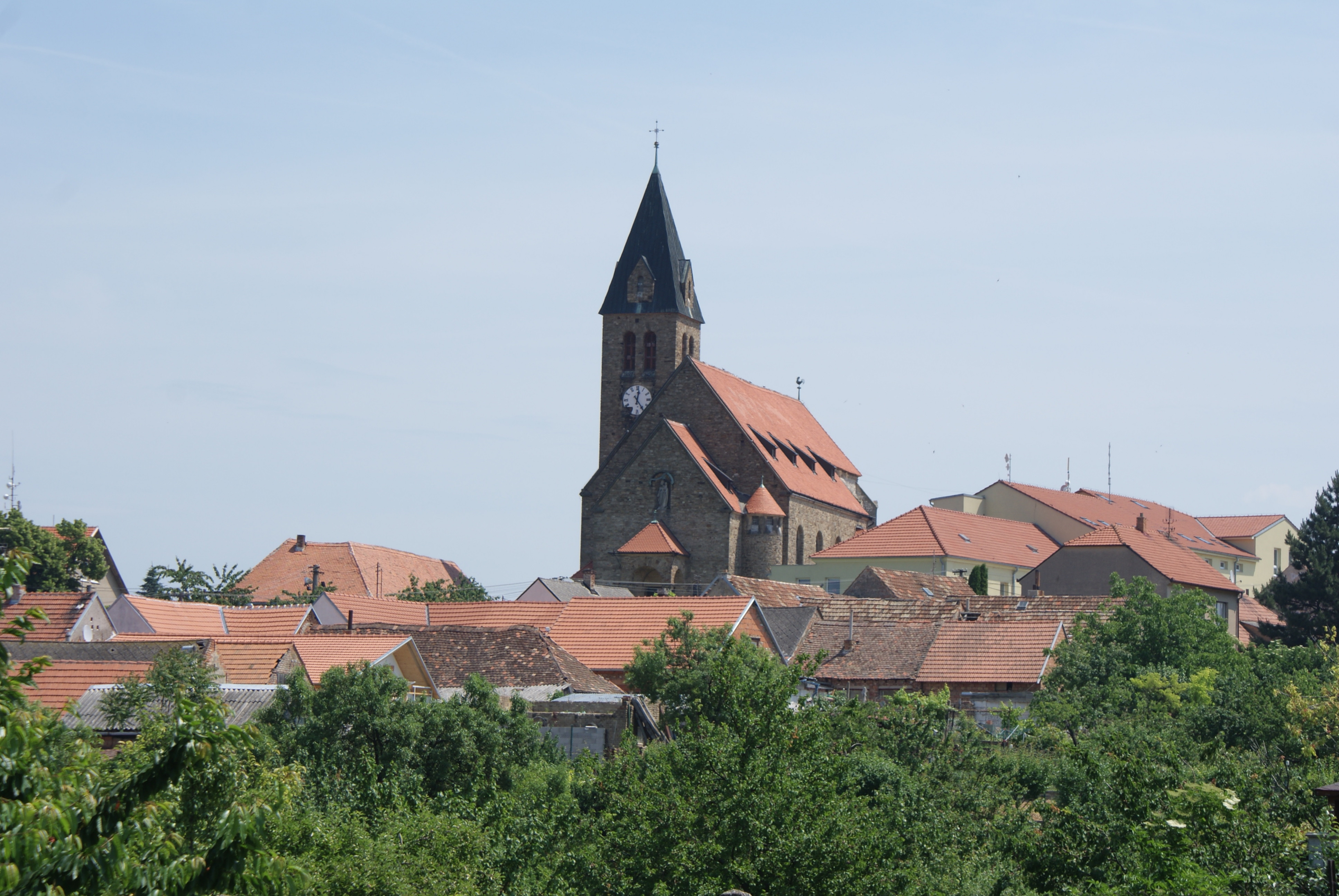
- Church of Saint John the Baptist

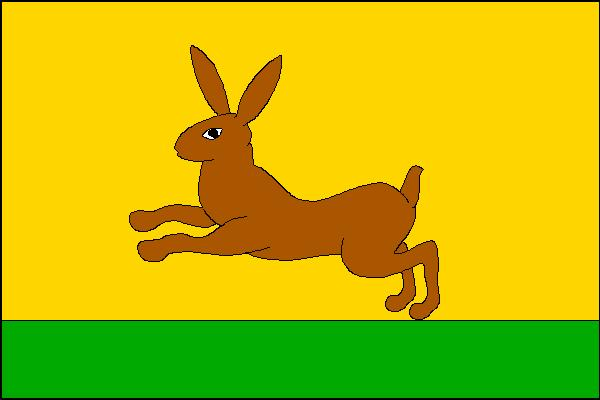
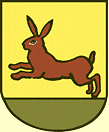
- Flag Coat of arms

- Location in the Czech Republic
- Coordinates: 48°52′23″N 16°45′59″E
- Country: Czech Republic
- Region: South Moravian
- District: Břeclav
- First mentioned: 1222

Area
  - Total: 15.86 km^{2} (6.12 sq mi)
- Elevation: 187 m (614 ft)

Population (2026-01-01)
  - Total: 1,583
  - Density: 99.81/km^{2} (258.5/sq mi)
- Time zone: UTC+1 (CET)
  - Summer (DST): UTC+2 (CEST)
- Postal code: 691 05
- Website: www.zajeci.cz

Zaječí (German: Saitz) is a municipality and village in Břeclav District in the South Moravian Region of the Czech Republic. It has about 1,600 inhabitants.

Zaječí lies approximately 16 kilometres (10 mi) north-west of Břeclav, 38 km (24 mi) south of Brno, and 217 km (135 mi) south-east of Prague.

== Demographics ==
Historical population
Year	Pop.	±%
1869	1,428	—
1880	1,523	+6.7%
1890	1,543	+1.3%
1900	1,500	−2.8%
1910	1,630	+8.7%
1921	1,481	−9.1%
1930	1,506	+1.7%
1950	1,214	−19.4%
1961	1,253	+3.2%
1970	1,308	+4.4%
1980	1,355	+3.6%
1991	1,320	−2.6%
2001	1,422	+7.7%
2011	1,375	−3.3%
2021	1,454	+5.7%
Source: Censuses
