= Ždánice Forest =

Mountain range and forest in the Czech Republic

Coordinates: 49°5′59.92″N 17°2′55.87″E

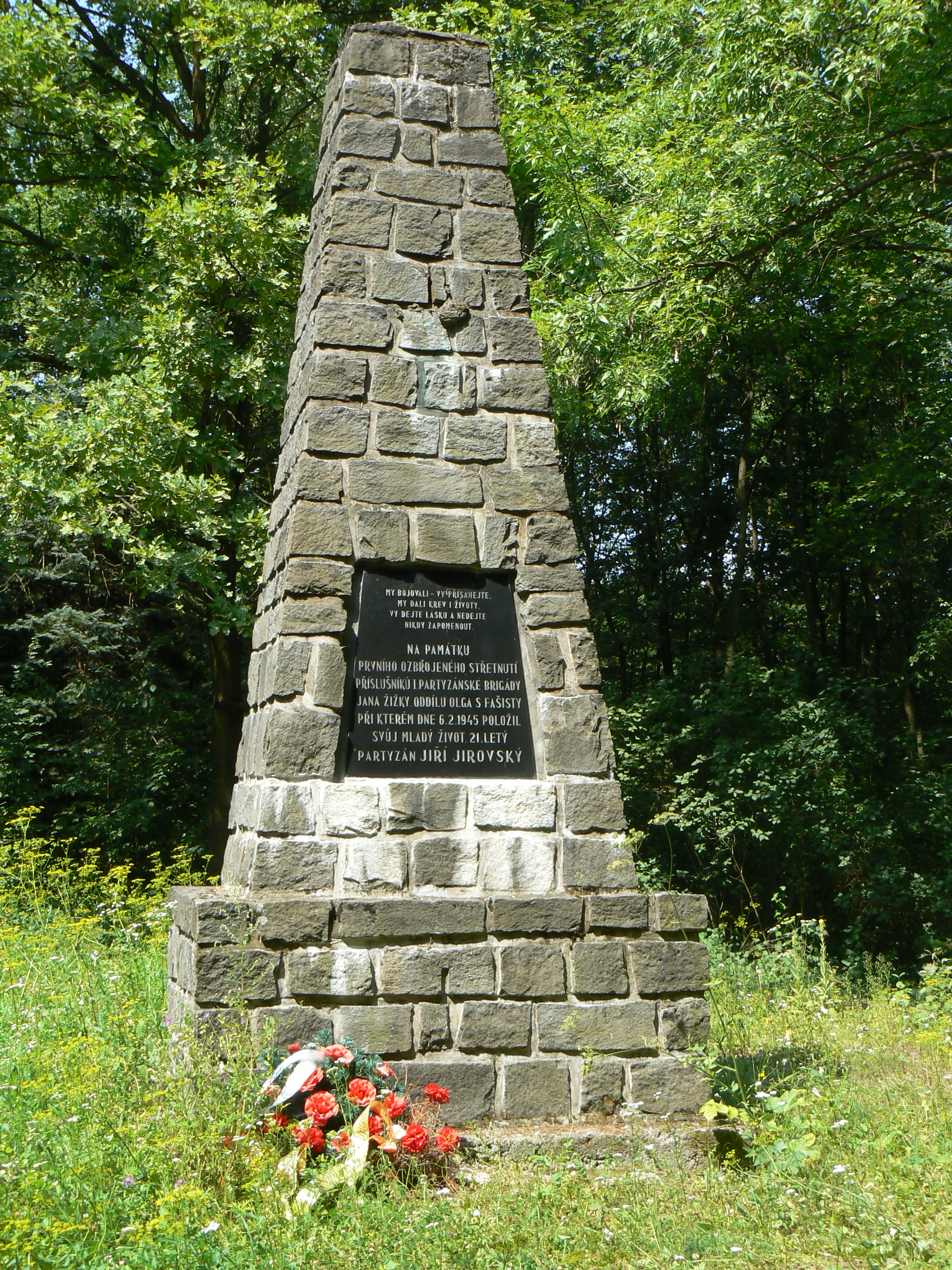
Monument to the Olga Partisan Division in the Ždánice Forest

The Ždánice Forest (in Czech, Ždánický les; known in German as the Steinitzer Wald) is a mountain range and forest in the Czech Republic, geologically part of the Central Moravian Carpathians of the Outer Western Carpathians.

The area is 470 square kilometers in size, with the highest point U Slepice ("The Hen") at 438 meters. Other significant peaks are Písečná (374 m), Nové Mountain (414 m), Na hradisku (399 m), Rádlovec (425 m), Prostřední hill (416 m) and Přední kout (410 m).

The Ždánický Forest Nature Park, proclaimed in 1996 with a size of 68 square kilometers, lies completely within the forest. U Vrby ("The Willows") is a nature preserve in the oldest part of the forest, in the Hodonín District.

Monuments along the hiking trail from Brankovice to Zdounky commemorate the work of the Olga Partisan Division in these woods, part of the Czech resistance to Nazi occupation in the 1940s.
