= Kyjov Hills =

Coordinates: 48°59′1″N 17°5′17″E

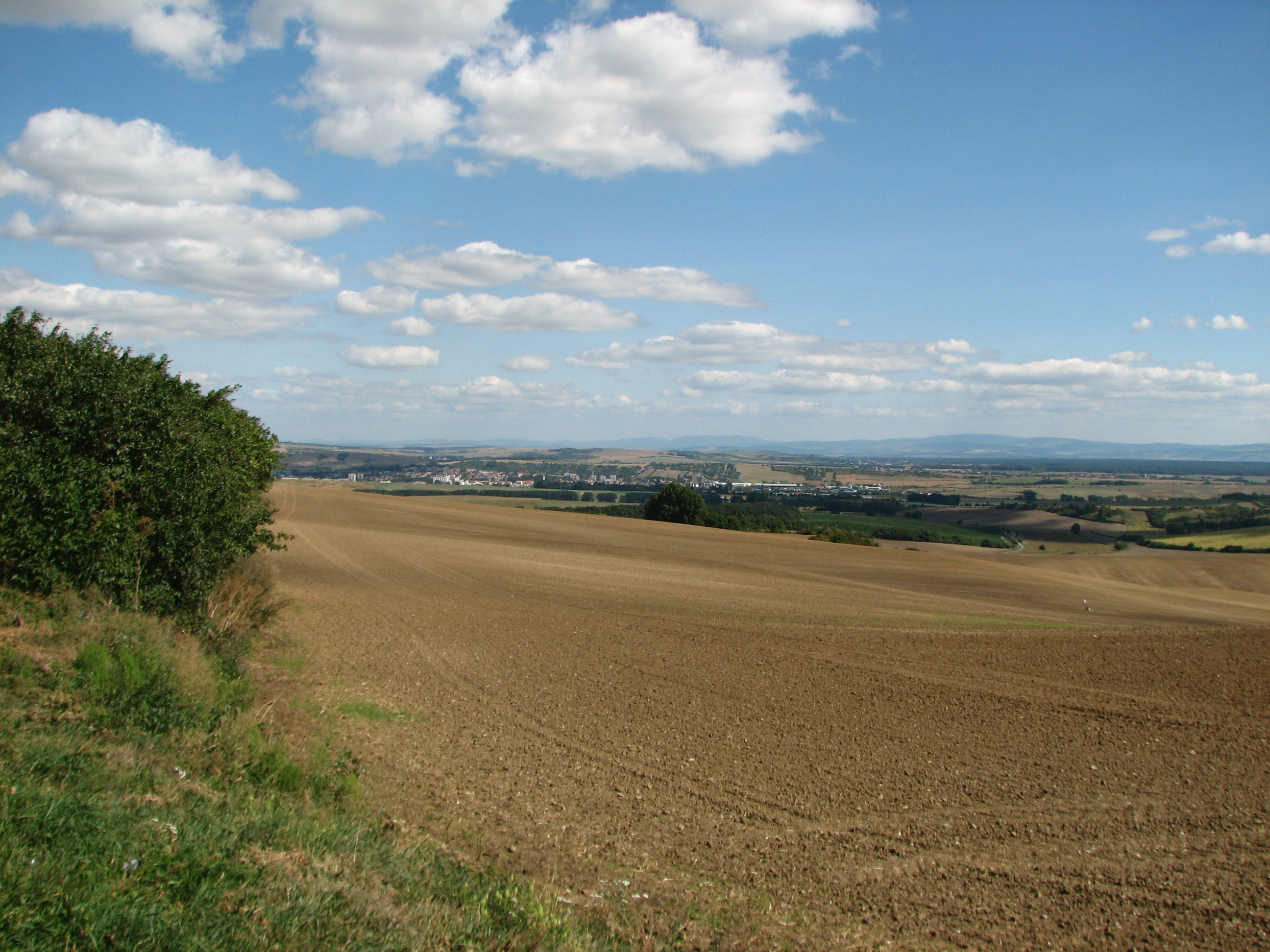
Babí lom, the highest point of the Kyjov Hills

The Kyjov Hills (Czech: Kyjovská pahorkatina) is an area in the South Moravian Region of the Czech Republic.

These relatively modest hills and undulating plateaus form a part of the Central Moravian Carpathians, within the Outer Western Carpathians. The hills spread over the area of 482 square kilometres (186 sq mi), and its highest point is Babí lom, at 417 metres (1,368 ft).

Economically it is an agricultural area with a substantial share of vineyards and orchards.
