= Brumovice =

Brumovice may refer to places in the Czech Republic:

- Brumovice (Břeclav District), a municipality and village in the South Moravian Region
- Brumovice (Opava District), a municipality and village in the Moravian-Silesian Region
