= Týnec =

Týnec may refer to places in the Czech Republic:

- Týnec (Břeclav District), a municipality and village in the South Moravian Region
- Týnec (Klatovy District), a municipality and village in the Plzeň Region
- Týnec, a village and part of Chotěšov (Plzeň-South District) in the Plzeň Region
- Týnec, a village and part of Dobrovice in the Central Bohemian Region
- Týnec, a village and part of Koleč in the Central Bohemian Region
- Týnec, a village and part of Malý Bor in the Plzeň Region
- Týnec, a village and part of Planá in the Plzeň Region
- Týnec nad Labem, a town in the Central Bohemian Region
- Týnec nad Sázavou, a town in the Central Bohemian Region
- Hrochův Týnec, a town in the Pardubice Region
- Panenský Týnec, a market town in the Ústí nad Labem Region
- Velký Týnec, a municipality and village in the Olomouc Region
