= Bořetice (Břeclav District) =

- Municipality
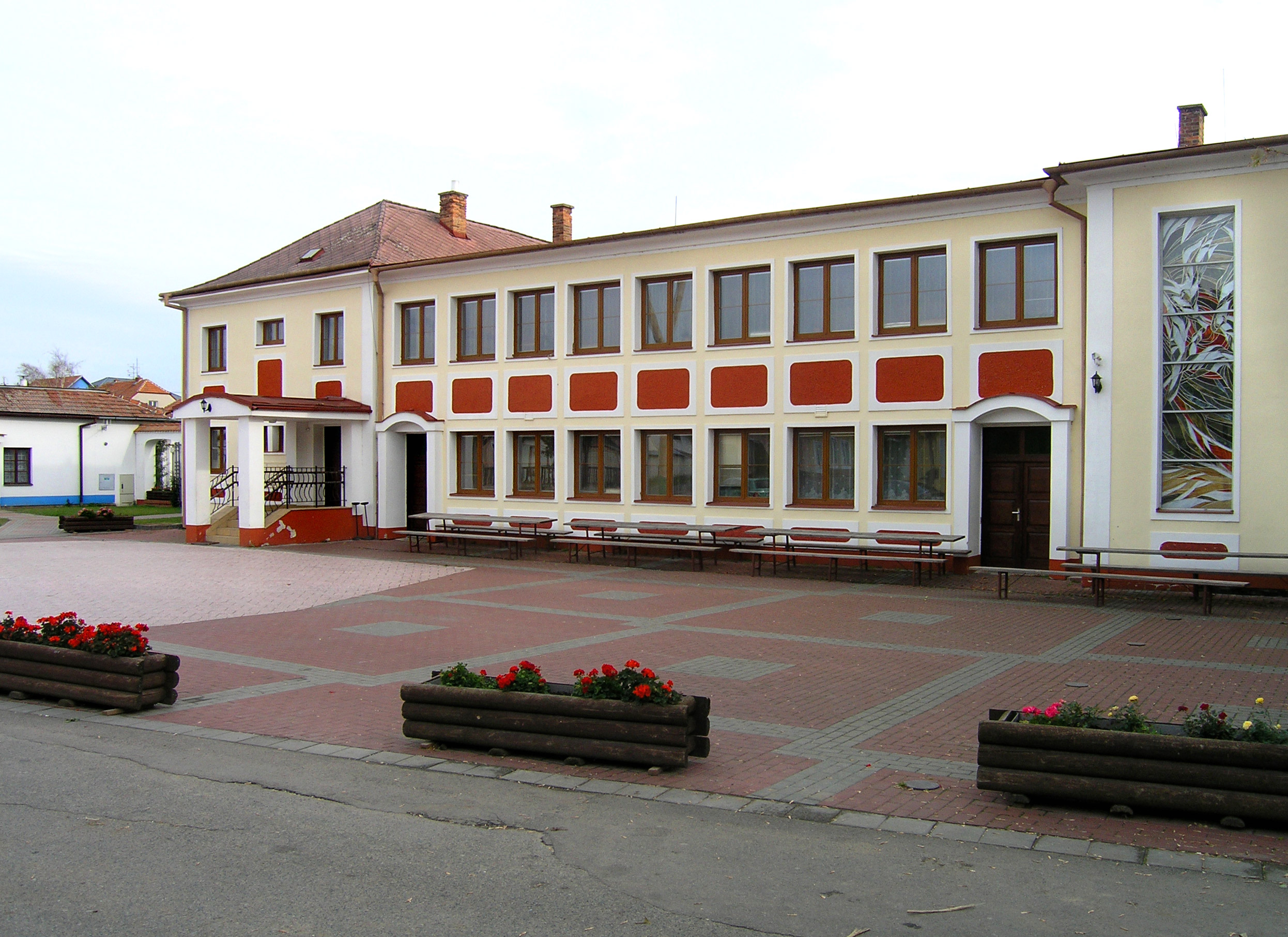
- Municipal office

- Flag Coat of arms

- Location in the Czech Republic
- Coordinates: 48°54′47″N 16°51′11″E
- Country: Czech Republic
- Region: South Moravian
- District: Břeclav
- First mentioned: 1222

Area
  - Total: 9.14 km^{2} (3.53 sq mi)
- Elevation: 192 m (630 ft)

Population (2026-01-01)
  - Total: 1,411
  - Density: 154/km^{2} (400/sq mi)
- Time zone: UTC+1 (CET)
  - Summer (DST): UTC+2 (CEST)
- Postal code: 691 08
- Website: www.boretice.cz

Bořetice is a municipality and village in Břeclav District in the South Moravian Region of the Czech Republic. It has about 1,400 inhabitants.

== Demographics ==
Historical population
Year	Pop.	±%
1869	850	—
1880	981	+15.4%
1890	937	−4.5%
1900	1,037	+10.7%
1910	1,142	+10.1%
1921	1,279	+12.0%
1930	1,212	−5.2%
1950	1,291	+6.5%
1961	1,473	+14.1%
1970	1,380	−6.3%
1980	1,334	−3.3%
1991	1,272	−4.6%
2001	1,313	+3.2%
2011	1,289	−1.8%
2021	1,238	−4.0%
Source: Censuses
