= Uherčice (Břeclav District) =

- Municipality
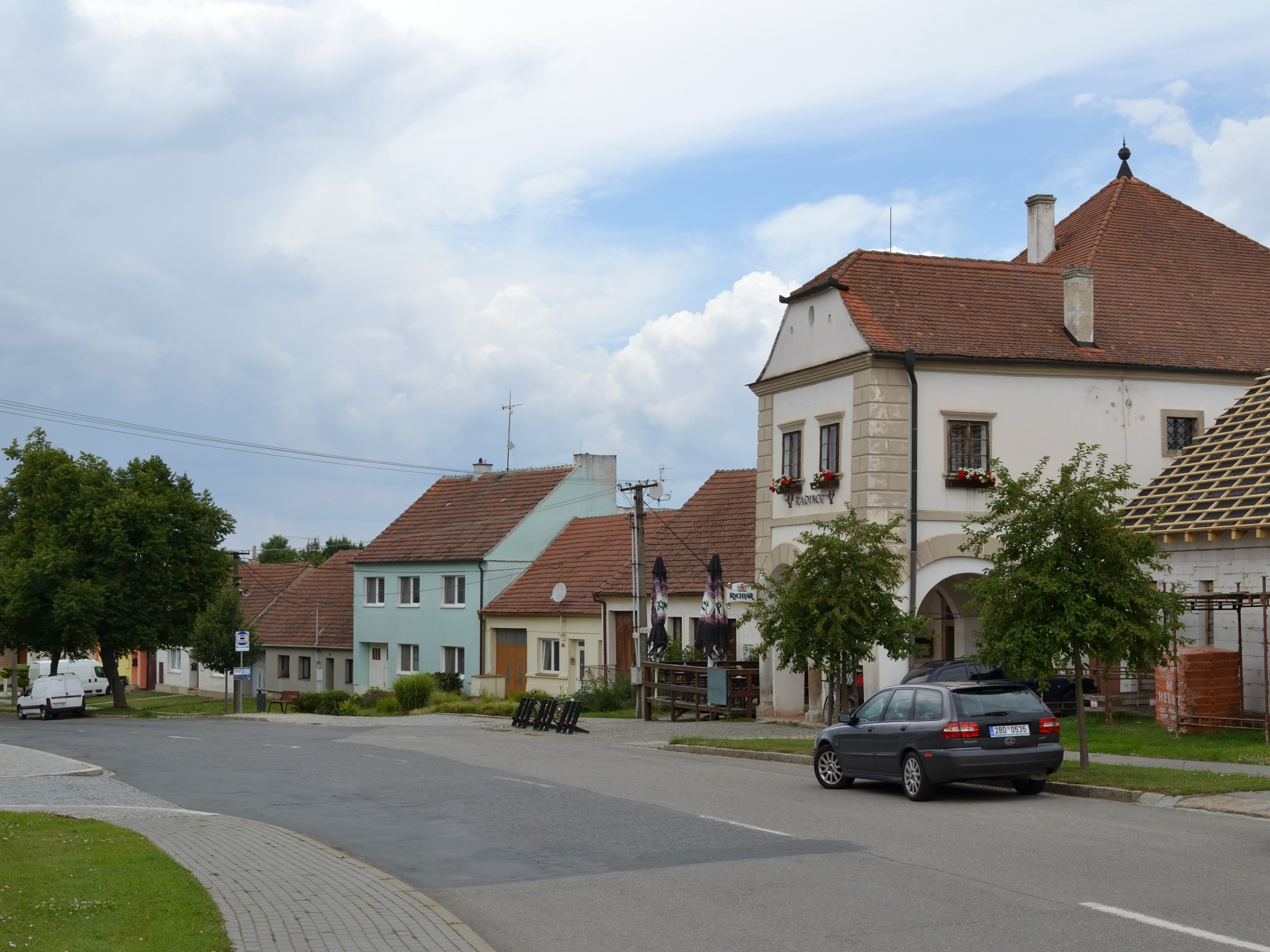
- Centre with the municipal office

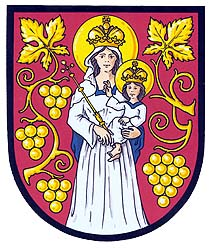
- Flag Coat of arms

- Location in the Czech Republic
- Coordinates: 48°58′4″N 16°39′12″E
- Country: Czech Republic
- Region: South Moravian
- District: Břeclav
- First mentioned: 1220

Area
  - Total: 13.56 km^{2} (5.24 sq mi)
- Elevation: 169 m (554 ft)

Population (2026-01-01)
  - Total: 1,127
  - Density: 83.11/km^{2} (215.3/sq mi)
- Time zone: UTC+1 (CET)
  - Summer (DST): UTC+2 (CEST)
- Postal code: 691 62
- Website: www.uhercice.cz

Uherčice (German: Auertschitz) is a municipality and village in Břeclav District in the South Moravian Region of the Czech Republic. It has about 1,100 inhabitants.

Uherčice lies approximately 28 kilometres (17 mi) north-west of Břeclav, 27 km (17 mi) south of Brno, and 205 km (127 mi) south-east of Prague.

== Demographics ==
Historical population
Year	Pop.	±%
1869	1,162	—
1880	1,131	−2.7%
1890	1,213	+7.3%
1900	1,202	−0.9%
1910	1,234	+2.7%
1921	1,244	+0.8%
1930	1,210	−2.7%
1950	1,099	−9.2%
1961	1,195	+8.7%
1970	1,109	−7.2%
1980	1,080	−2.6%
1991	1,034	−4.3%
2001	1,010	−2.3%
2011	1,029	+1.9%
2021	1,073	+4.3%
Source: Censuses
