= Křepice (Břeclav District) =

- Municipality
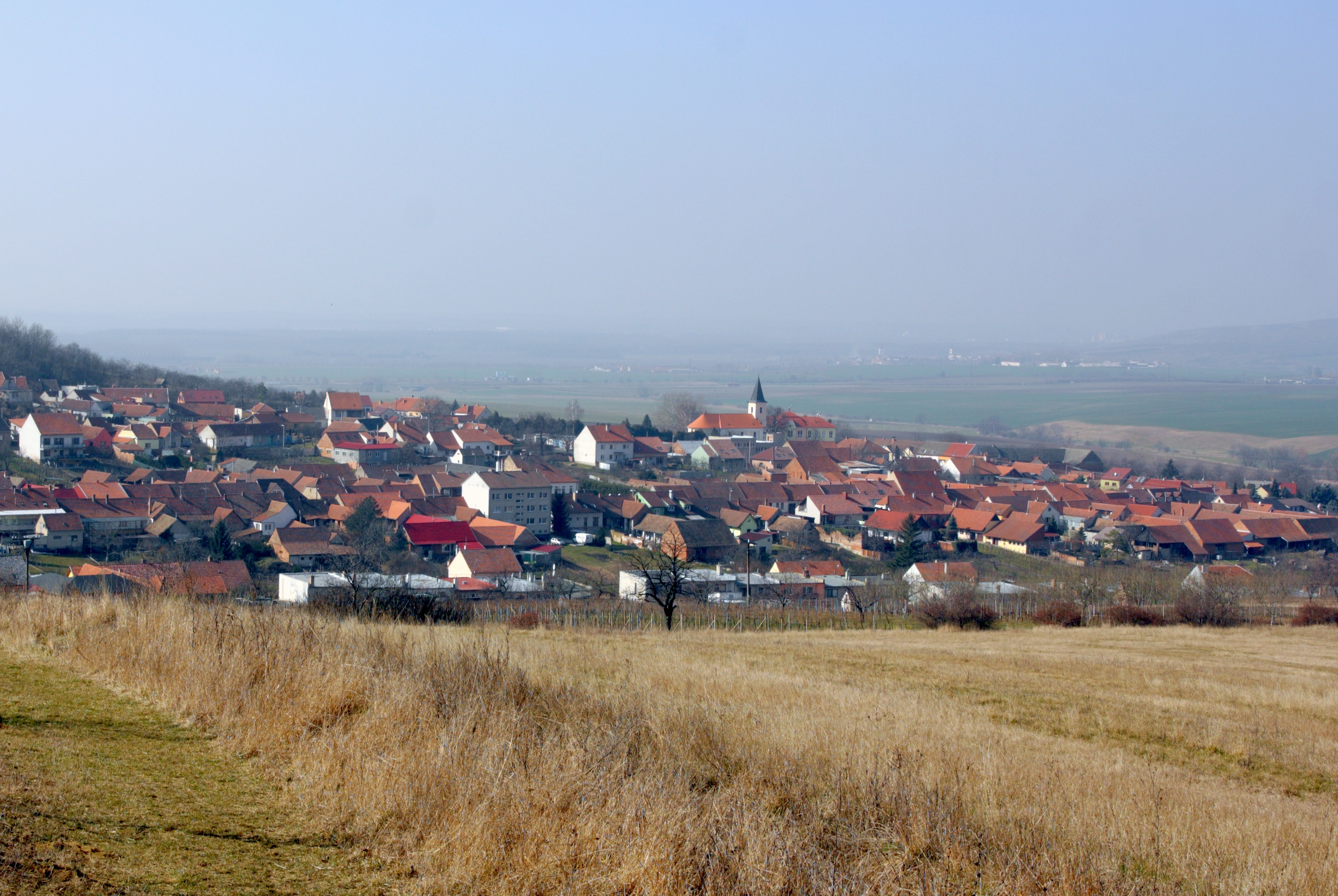
- General view

- Flag Coat of arms

- Location in the Czech Republic
- Coordinates: 49°0′0″N 16°43′12″E
- Country: Czech Republic
- Region: South Moravian
- District: Břeclav
- First mentioned: 1349

Area
  - Total: 6.72 km^{2} (2.59 sq mi)
- Elevation: 248 m (814 ft)

Population (2026-01-01)
  - Total: 1,330
  - Density: 198/km^{2} (513/sq mi)
- Time zone: UTC+1 (CET)
  - Summer (DST): UTC+2 (CEST)
- Postal code: 691 65
- Website: www.krepice.cz

Křepice is a municipality and village in Břeclav District in the South Moravian Region of the Czech Republic. It has about 1,300 inhabitants.

Křepice lies approximately 30 kilometres (19 mi) north-west of Břeclav, 24 km (15 mi) south of Brno, and 206 km (128 mi) south-east of Prague.

== Demographics ==
Historical population
Year	Pop.	±%
1869	818	—
1880	841	+2.8%
1890	883	+5.0%
1900	1,007	+14.0%
1910	1,073	+6.6%
1921	1,134	+5.7%
1930	1,186	+4.6%
1950	1,128	−4.9%
1961	1,232	+9.2%
1970	1,208	−1.9%
1980	1,208	+0.0%
1991	1,211	+0.2%
2001	1,226	+1.2%
2011	1,273	+3.8%
2021	1,257	−1.3%
Source: Censuses
