= Šitbořice =

- Municipality
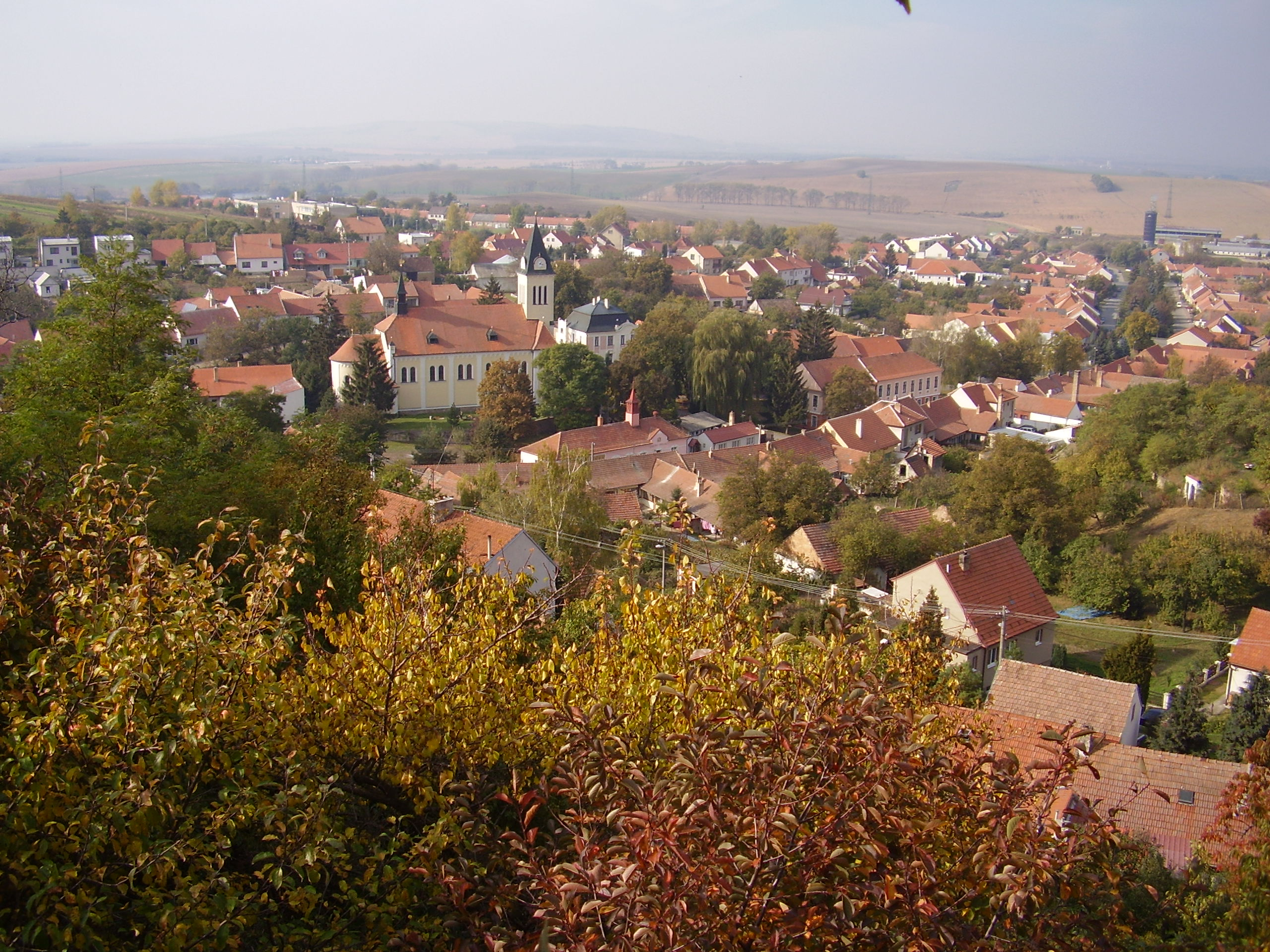
- General view

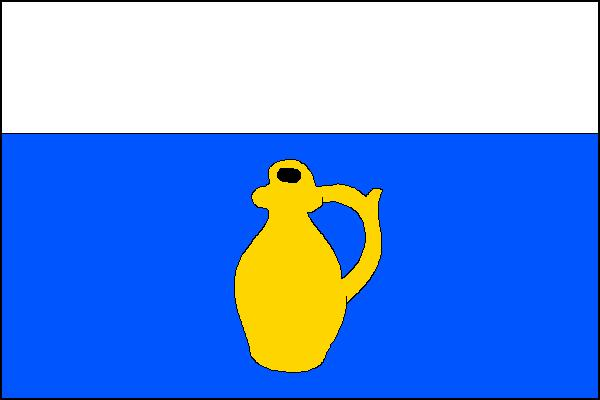
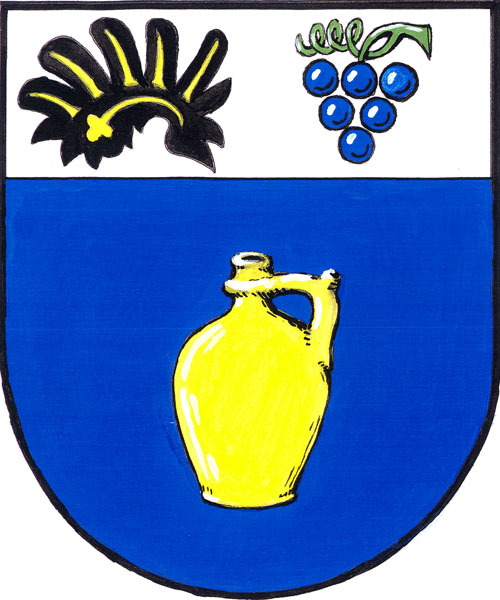
- Flag Coat of arms

- Location in the Czech Republic
- Coordinates: 49°0′52″N 16°46′47″E
- Country: Czech Republic
- Region: South Moravian
- District: Břeclav
- First mentioned: 1255

Area
  - Total: 12.25 km^{2} (4.73 sq mi)
- Elevation: 264 m (866 ft)

Population (2026-01-01)
  - Total: 2,124
  - Density: 173.4/km^{2} (449.1/sq mi)
- Time zone: UTC+1 (CET)
  - Summer (DST): UTC+2 (CEST)
- Postal code: 691 76
- Website: www.sitborice.cz

Šitbořice (German: Schüttboritz) is a municipality and village in Břeclav District in the South Moravian Region of the Czech Republic. It has about 2,100 inhabitants.

== Etymology ==
The initial name of the village of Ješutbořice. The name was derived from Lord Ješutboř, to whom the local fortress belonged. The name evolved to Jestbořice and then to Šitbořice.

== Geography ==
Šitbořice is located about 28 kilometres (17 mi) north of Břeclav and 23 km (14 mi) south of Brno. It lies in the Ždánice Forest. The highest point is the Líchy hill at 331 m (1,086 ft) above sea level.

== History ==
The first written mention of Šitbořice is from 1255. From the 14th century, it was known for its vineyards. Many different nobles took turns in ownership of the village and the owners often changed.

== Demographics ==
Historical population

Year	Pop.	±%
1869	1,162	—
1880	1,341	+15.4%
1890	1,379	+2.8%
1900	1,458	+5.7%
1910	1,598	+9.6%

Year	Pop.	±%
1921	1,627	+1.8%
1930	1,851	+13.8%
1950	1,833	−1.0%
1961	2,057	+12.2%
1970	2,044	−0.6%

Year	Pop.	±%
1980	2,009	−1.7%
1991	1,927	−4.1%
2001	1,948	+1.1%
2011	1,916	−1.6%
2021	2,061	+7.6%

Source: Censuses

== Economy ==
Šitbořice is known for viticulture. It lies in the Velkopavlovická wine subregion.

== Transport ==
There are no railways or major roads passing through the municipality.

== Sights ==
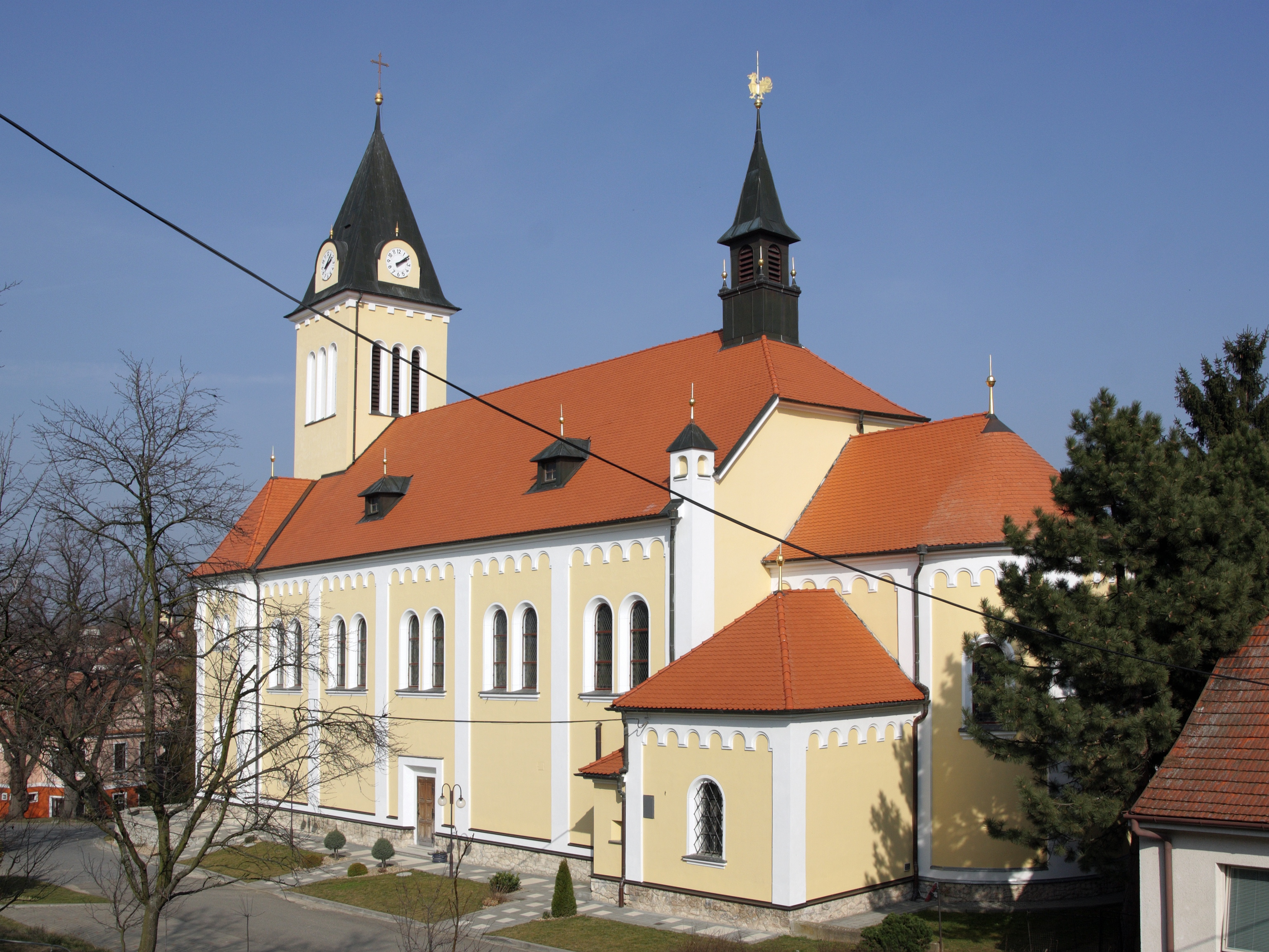
Church of Saint Nicholas

The only protected cultural monument in Šitbořice is a late Baroque statue of Saint John of Nepomuk, which dates from 1759.

The main landmark of Šitbořice is the Church of Saint Nicholas. The oldest church in the village, built before 1255, was destroyed in 1645 (during the Thirty Years' War). In 1669, the church was completely rebuilt in the Baroque style, but in the 19th century its capacity was no longer sufficient. The old church was demolished and the current church was built on its site in 1913.
