= Sedlec (Břeclav District) =

- Municipality
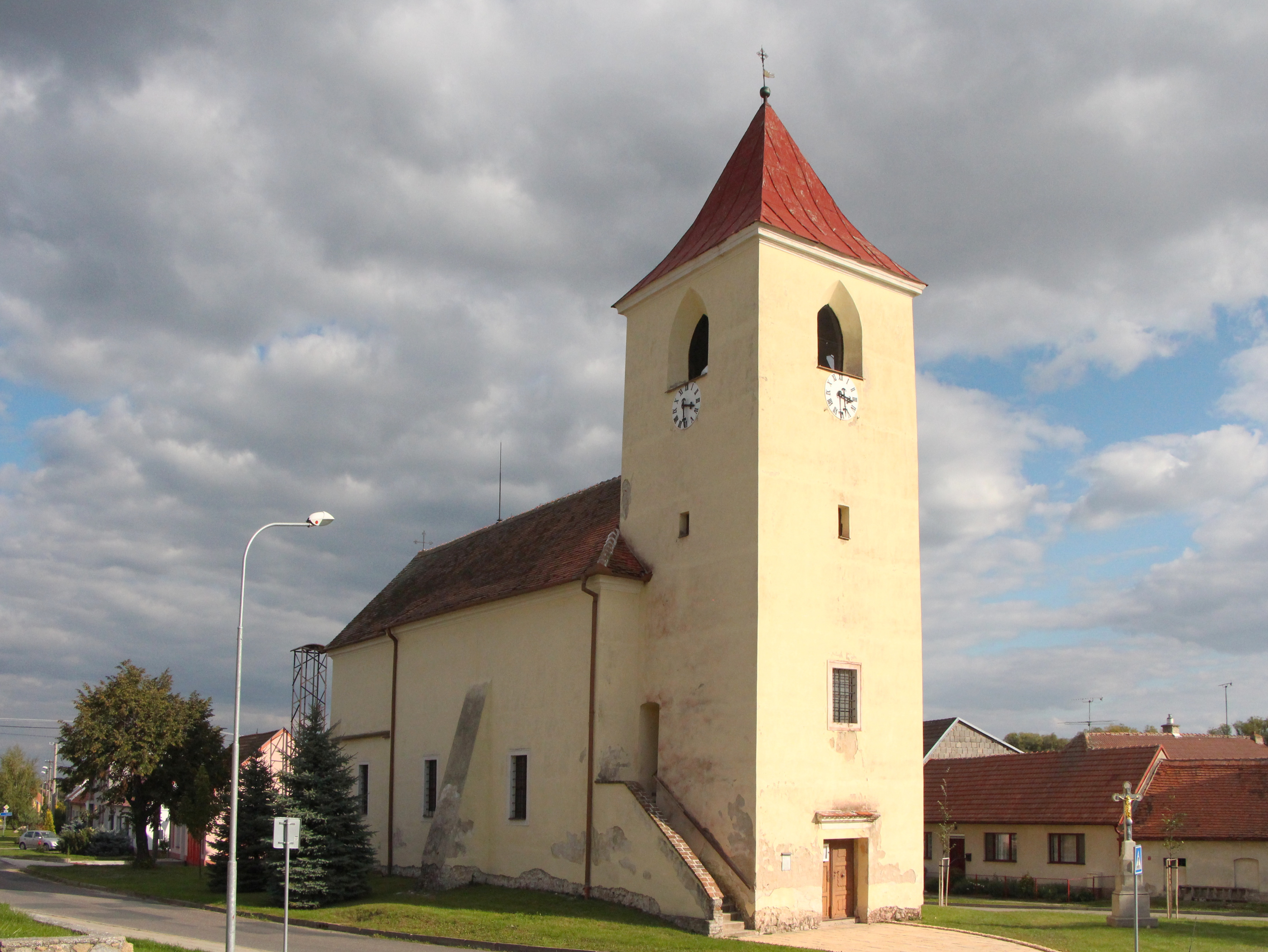
- Church of Saint Vitus

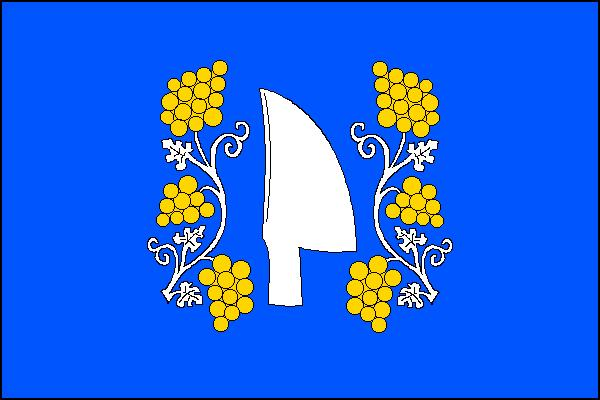
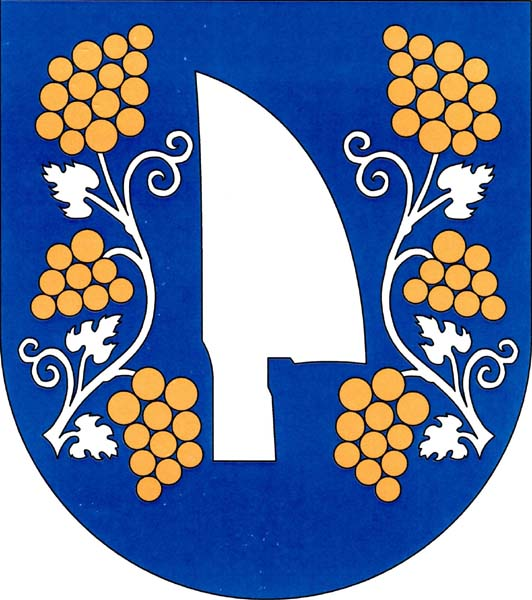
- Flag Coat of arms

- Location in the Czech Republic
- Coordinates: 48°46′44″N 16°41′38″E
- Country: Czech Republic
- Region: South Moravian
- District: Břeclav
- First mentioned: 1305

Area
  - Total: 20.78 km^{2} (8.02 sq mi)
- Elevation: 187 m (614 ft)

Population (2026-01-01)
  - Total: 839
  - Density: 40.4/km^{2} (105/sq mi)
- Time zone: UTC+1 (CET)
  - Summer (DST): UTC+2 (CEST)
- Postal code: 691 21
- Website: www.sedlecumikulova.cz

Sedlec (German: Voitelsbrunn) is a municipality and village in Břeclav District in the South Moravian Region of the Czech Republic. It has about 800 inhabitants.

Sedlec lies approximately 14 kilometres (9 mi) west of Břeclav, 47 km (29 mi) south of Brno, and 220 km (140 mi) south-east of Prague.

== Demographics ==
Historical population
Year	Pop.	±%
1869	893	—
1880	969	+8.5%
1890	1,000	+3.2%
1900	1,035	+3.5%
1910	1,035	+0.0%
1921	1,146	+10.7%
1930	1,151	+0.4%
1950	803	−30.2%
1961	922	+14.8%
1970	867	−6.0%
1980	881	+1.6%
1991	807	−8.4%
2001	806	−0.1%
2011	837	+3.8%
2021	793	−5.3%
Source: Censuses
