= Velké Hostěrádky =

- Municipality
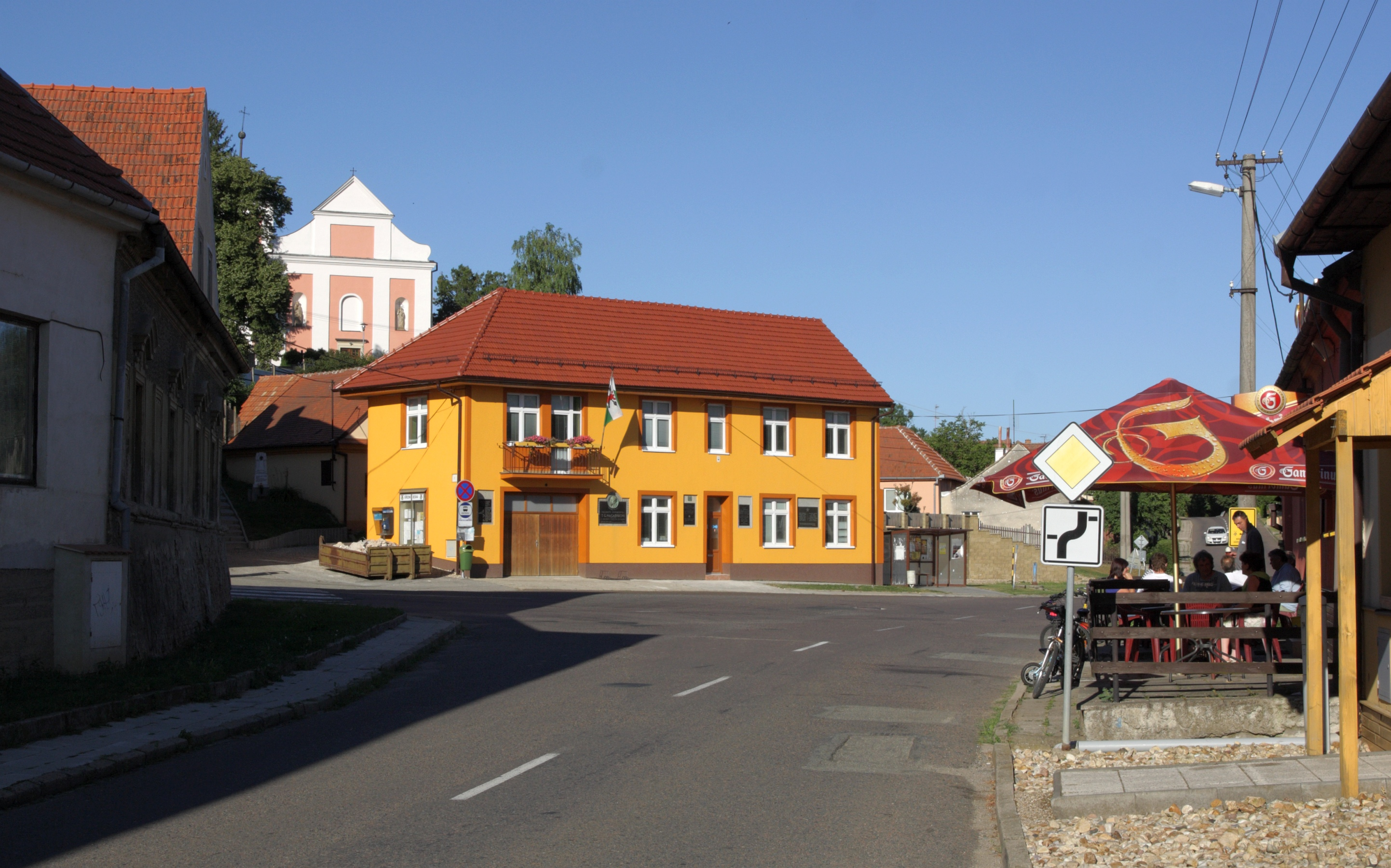
- Municipal office in the village centre

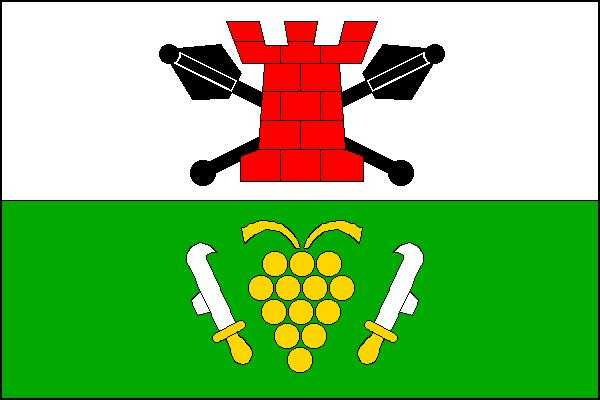
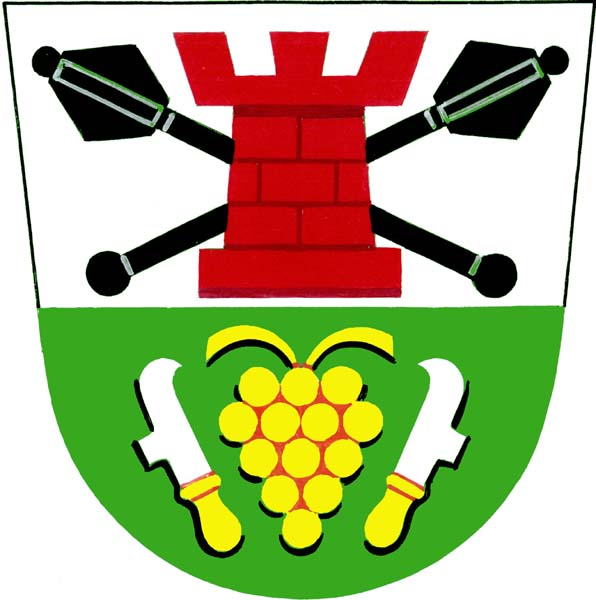
- Flag Coat of arms

- Location in the Czech Republic
- Coordinates: 49°1′59″N 16°52′13″E
- Country: Czech Republic
- Region: South Moravian
- District: Břeclav
- First mentioned: 1210

Area
  - Total: 10.58 km^{2} (4.08 sq mi)
- Elevation: 215 m (705 ft)

Population (2026-01-01)
  - Total: 504
  - Density: 47.6/km^{2} (123/sq mi)
- Time zone: UTC+1 (CET)
  - Summer (DST): UTC+2 (CEST)
- Postal code: 691 74
- Website: www.velkehosteradky.cz

Velké Hostěrádky (German: Hostraditz) is a municipality and village in Břeclav District in the South Moravian Region of the Czech Republic. It has about 500 inhabitants.

Velké Hostěrádky lies approximately 32 kilometres (20 mi) north of Břeclav, 26 km (16 mi) south-east of Brno, and 212 km (132 mi) south-east of Prague.

== Demographics ==
Historical population
Year	Pop.	±%
1869	620	—
1880	653	+5.3%
1890	668	+2.3%
1900	758	+13.5%
1910	757	−0.1%
1921	780	+3.0%
1930	757	−2.9%
1950	627	−17.2%
1961	634	+1.1%
1970	565	−10.9%
1980	480	−15.0%
1991	396	−17.5%
2001	400	+1.0%
2011	456	+14.0%
2021	493	+8.1%
Source: Censuses
