= Vrbice (Břeclav District) =

- Municipality
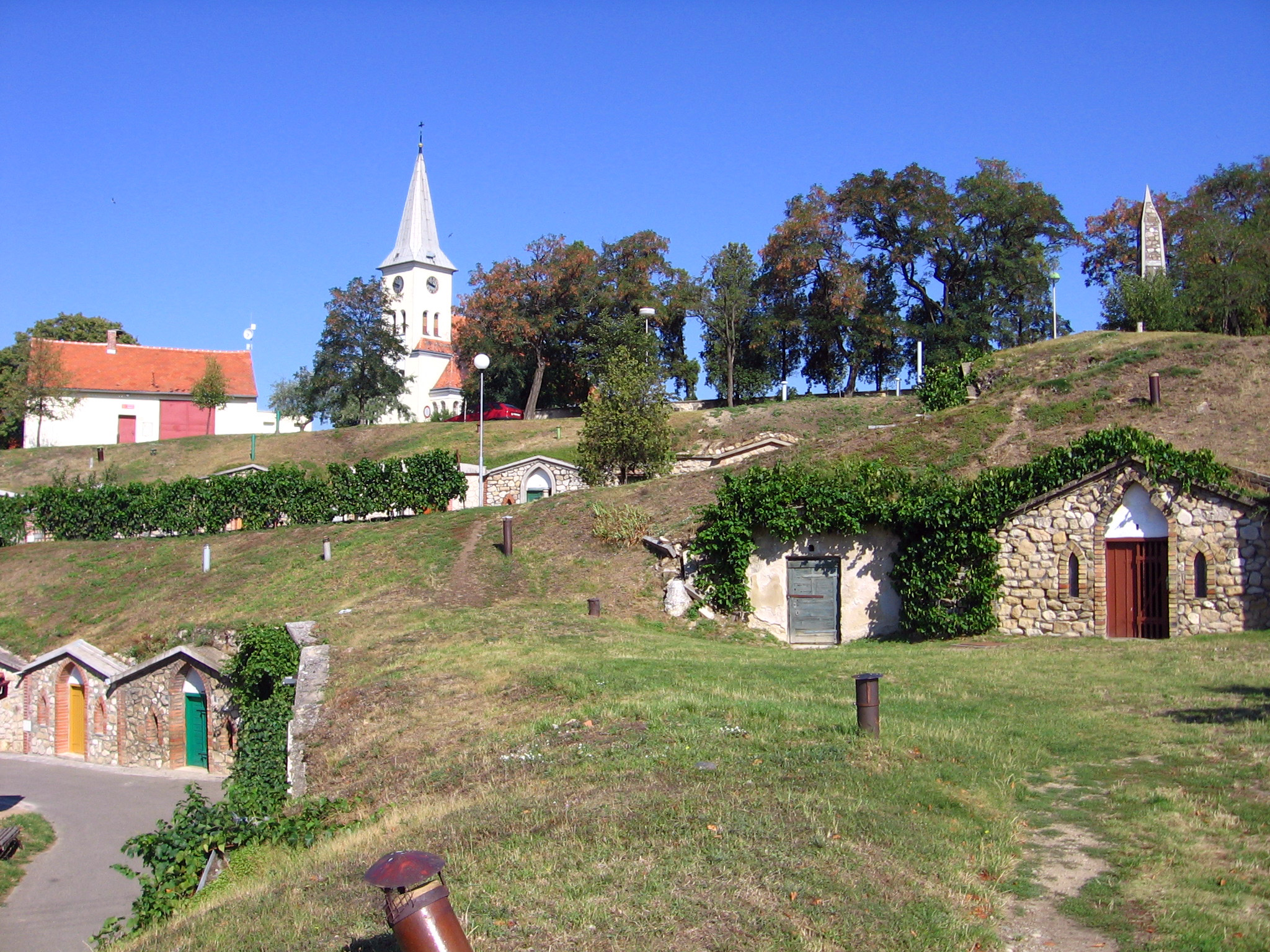
- Church of Saint Giles and wine cellars

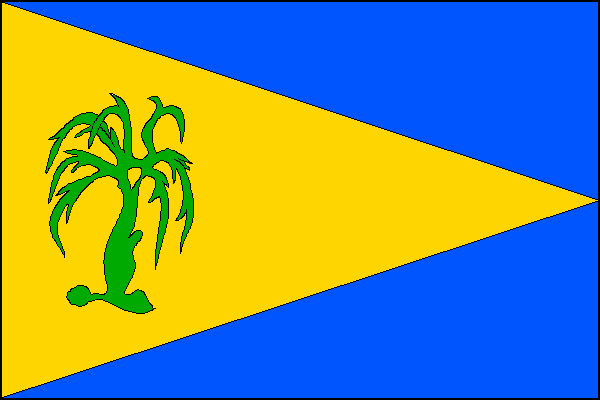
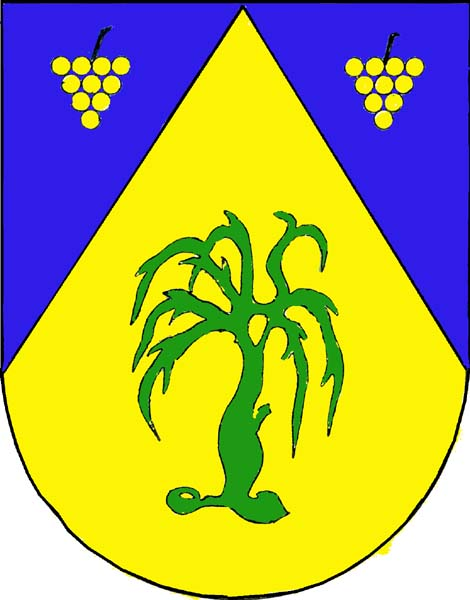
- Flag Coat of arms

- Location in the Czech Republic
- Coordinates: 48°54′54″N 16°53′52″E
- Country: Czech Republic
- Region: South Moravian
- District: Břeclav
- First mentioned: 1222

Area
  - Total: 9.39 km^{2} (3.63 sq mi)
- Elevation: 290 m (950 ft)

Population (2026-01-01)
  - Total: 1,098
  - Density: 117/km^{2} (303/sq mi)
- Time zone: UTC+1 (CET)
  - Summer (DST): UTC+2 (CEST)
- Postal code: 691 09
- Website: www.vrbice.cz

Vrbice is a municipality and village in Břeclav District in the South Moravian Region of the Czech Republic. It has about 1,100 inhabitants.

Vrbice lies approximately 18 kilometres (11 mi) north of Břeclav, 38 km (24 mi) south-east of Brno, and 222 km (138 mi) south-east of Prague.

== Demographics ==
Historical population
Year	Pop.	±%
1869	878	—
1880	1,052	+19.8%
1890	978	−7.0%
1900	1,180	+20.7%
1910	1,199	+1.6%
1921	1,343	+12.0%
1930	1,349	+0.4%
1950	1,329	−1.5%
1961	1,456	+9.6%
1970	1,361	−6.5%
1980	1,239	−9.0%
1991	1,137	−8.2%
2001	1,096	−3.6%
2011	1,119	+2.1%
2021	1,043	−6.8%
Source: Censuses
