= Kostice =

- Municipality
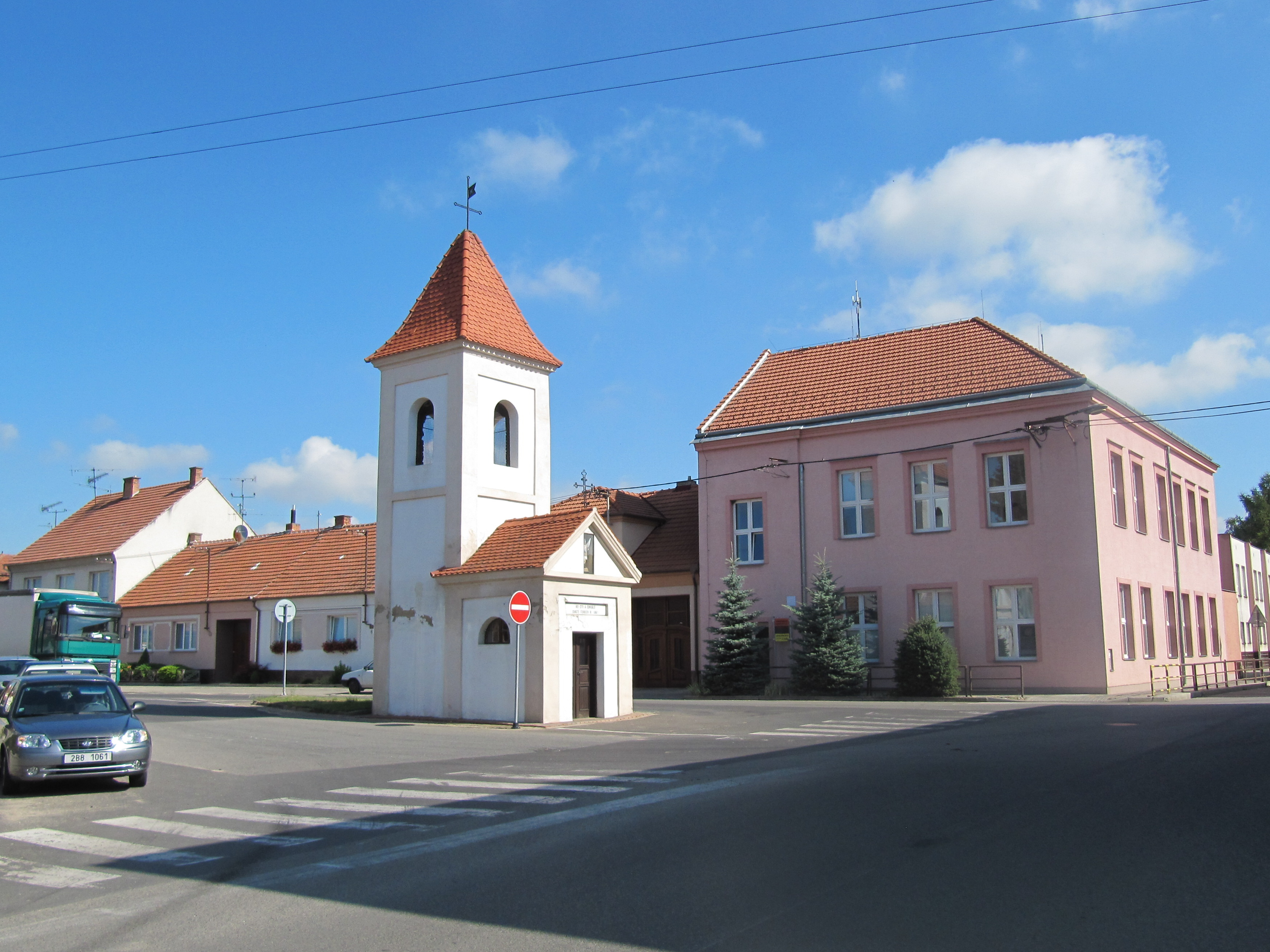
- Chapel of Saint Therese with the belltower

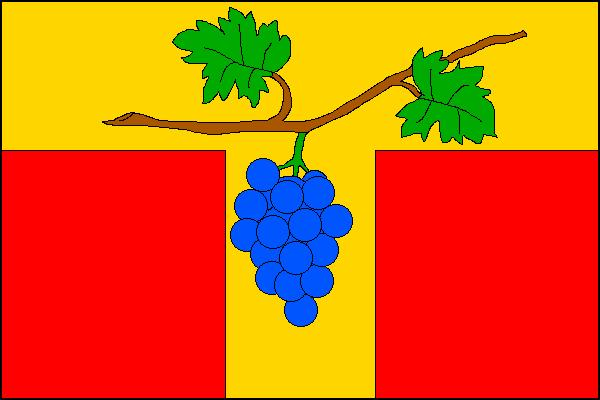
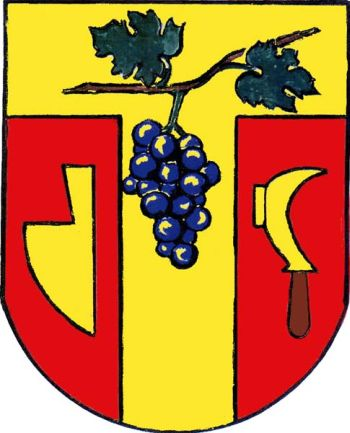
- Flag Coat of arms

- Location in the Czech Republic
- Coordinates: 48°44′49″N 16°58′43″E
- Country: Czech Republic
- Region: South Moravian
- District: Břeclav
- First mentioned: 1384

Area
  - Total: 12.32 km^{2} (4.76 sq mi)
- Elevation: 168 m (551 ft)

Population (2026-01-01)
  - Total: 1,861
  - Density: 151.1/km^{2} (391.2/sq mi)
- Time zone: UTC+1 (CET)
  - Summer (DST): UTC+2 (CEST)
- Postal code: 691 52
- Website: www.kostice.cz

Kostice (German: Kostitz) is a municipality and village in Břeclav District in the South Moravian Region of the Czech Republic. It has about 1,900 inhabitants.

Kostice lies approximately 7 kilometres (4 mi) east of Břeclav, 57 km (35 mi) south-east of Brno, and 238 km (148 mi) south-east of Prague.

== Demographics ==
Historical population
Year	Pop.	±%
1869	1,252	—
1880	1,479	+18.1%
1890	1,629	+10.1%
1900	1,766	+8.4%
1910	2,037	+15.3%
1921	2,160	+6.0%
1930	2,176	+0.7%
1950	2,063	−5.2%
1961	2,276	+10.3%
1970	2,193	−3.6%
1980	2,152	−1.9%
1991	1,934	−10.1%
2001	1,838	−5.0%
2011	1,789	−2.7%
2021	1,787	−0.1%
Source: Censuses
