= Horní Bojanovice =

- Municipality
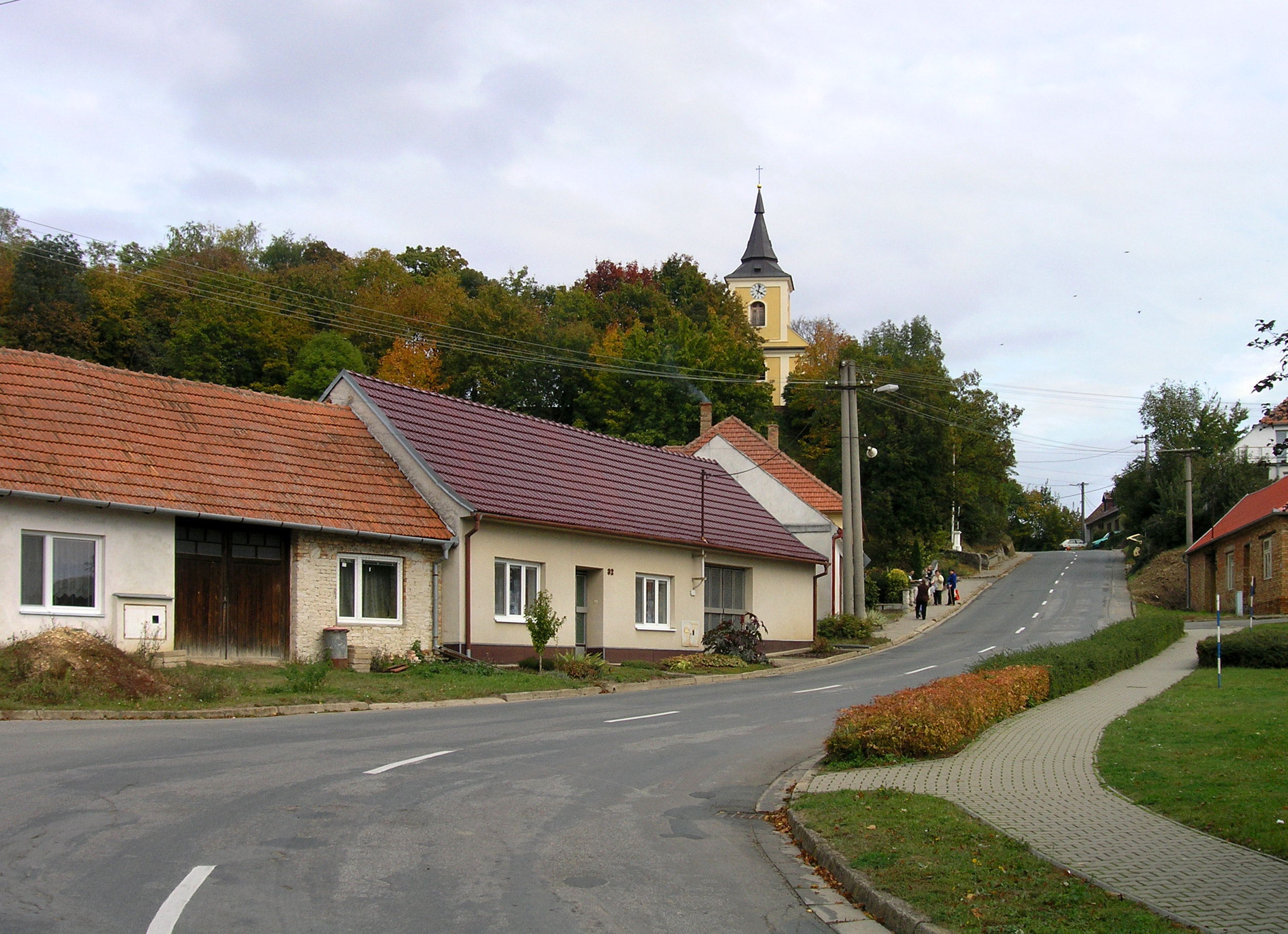
- Northern part of the village

- Flag Coat of arms

- Location in the Czech Republic
- Coordinates: 48°56′59″N 16°48′0″E
- Country: Czech Republic
- Region: South Moravian
- District: Břeclav
- First mentioned: 1298

Area
  - Total: 8.37 km^{2} (3.23 sq mi)
- Elevation: 228 m (748 ft)

Population (2026-01-01)
  - Total: 657
  - Density: 78.5/km^{2} (203/sq mi)
- Time zone: UTC+1 (CET)
  - Summer (DST): UTC+2 (CEST)
- Postal code: 693 01
- Website: www.hornibojanovice.cz

Horní Bojanovice is a municipality and village in Břeclav District in the South Moravian Region of the Czech Republic. It has about 700 inhabitants.

Horní Bojanovice lies approximately 22 kilometres (14 mi) north of Břeclav, 31 km (19 mi) south-east of Brno, and 214 km (133 mi) south-east of Prague.

== Demographics ==
Historical population
Year	Pop.	±%
1869	816	—
1880	849	+4.0%
1890	887	+4.5%
1900	882	−0.6%
1910	919	+4.2%
1921	951	+3.5%
1930	872	−8.3%
1950	748	−14.2%
1961	781	+4.4%
1970	768	−1.7%
1980	718	−6.5%
1991	639	−11.0%
2001	612	−4.2%
2011	629	+2.8%
2021	628	−0.2%
Source: Censuses
