= Milovice (Břeclav District) =

- Municipality
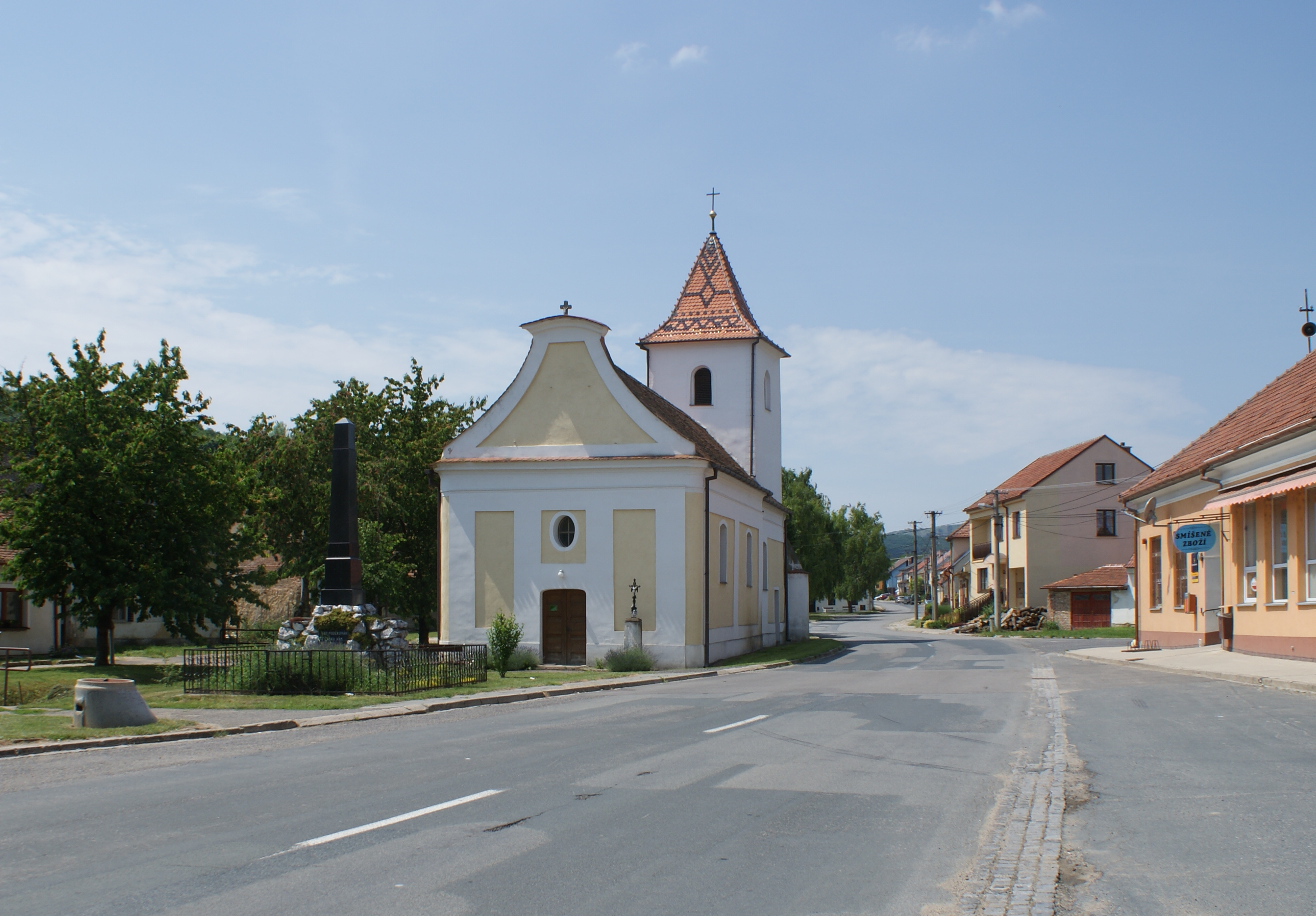
- Church of Saint Oswald

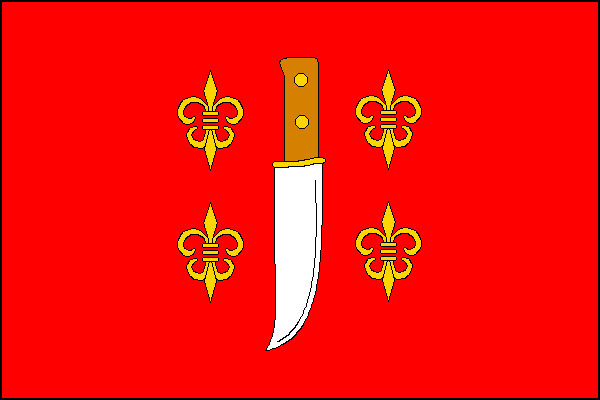
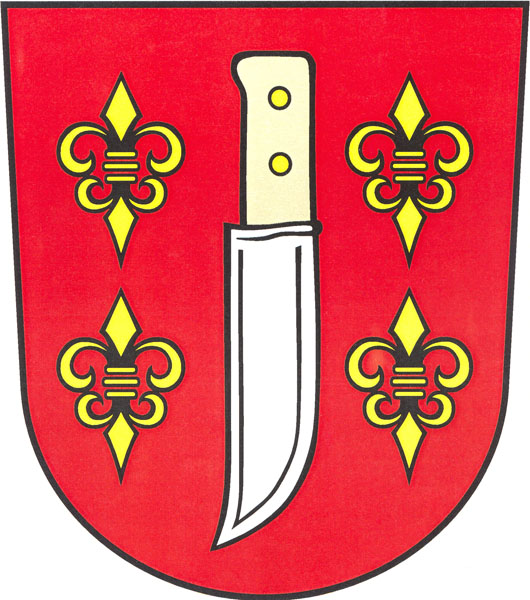
- Flag Coat of arms

- Location in the Czech Republic
- Coordinates: 48°51′9″N 16°41′53″E
- Country: Czech Republic
- Region: South Moravian
- District: Břeclav
- First mentioned: 1298

Area
  - Total: 6.51 km^{2} (2.51 sq mi)
- Elevation: 180 m (590 ft)

Population (2026-01-01)
  - Total: 512
  - Density: 78.6/km^{2} (204/sq mi)
- Time zone: UTC+1 (CET)
  - Summer (DST): UTC+2 (CEST)
- Postal code: 691 88
- Website: www.obec-milovice.cz

Milovice (German: Millowitz) is a municipality and village in Břeclav District in the South Moravian Region of the Czech Republic. It has about 500 inhabitants.

Milovice lies approximately 17 kilometres (11 mi) north-west of Břeclav, 40 km (25 mi) south of Brno, and 215 km (134 mi) south-east of Prague.

== Demographics ==
Historical population
Year	Pop.	±%
1869	457	—
1880	523	+14.4%
1890	575	+9.9%
1900	638	+11.0%
1910	690	+8.2%
1921	687	−0.4%
1930	597	−13.1%
1950	425	−28.8%
1961	449	+5.6%
1970	457	+1.8%
1980	461	+0.9%
1991	451	−2.2%
2001	462	+2.4%
2011	422	−8.7%
2021	454	+7.6%
Source: Censuses
