= Břeclav District =

Břeclav District Okres Břeclav
- District
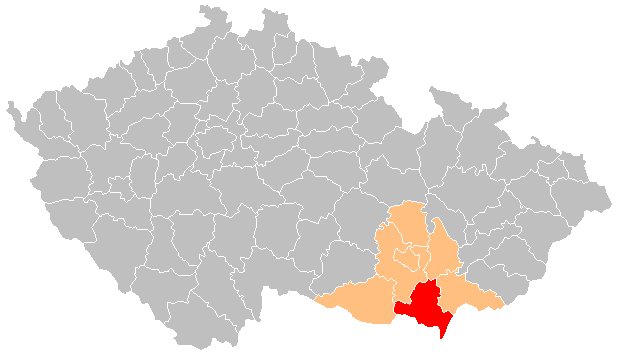
- Location in the South Moravian Region within the Czech Republic
- Coordinates: 48°51′N 16°49′E
- Country: Czech Republic
- Region: South Moravian
- Capital: Břeclav

Area
  - Total: 1,037.97 km^{2} (400.76 sq mi)

Population (2026)
  - Total: 117,941
  - Density: 113.627/km^{2} (294.292/sq mi)
- Time zone: UTC+1 (CET)
  - Summer (DST): UTC+2 (CEST)
- Municipalities: 63
- * Towns: 9
- * Market towns: 4

Břeclav District (Czech: okres Břeclav) is a district in the South Moravian Region of the Czech Republic. Its capital is the town of Břeclav.

== Administrative division ==
Břeclav District is divided into three administrative districts of municipalities with extended competence: Břeclav, Hustopeče and Mikulov.

=== List of municipalities ===
Towns are marked in bold and market towns in italics:

Bavory - Boleradice - Borkovany - Bořetice - Břeclav - Březí - Brod nad Dyjí - Brumovice - Bulhary - Diváky - Dobré Pole - Dolní Dunajovice - Dolní Věstonice - Drnholec - Hlohovec - Horní Bojanovice - Horní Věstonice - Hrušky - Hustopeče - Jevišovka - Kašnice - Klentnice - Klobouky u Brna - Kobylí - Kostice - Křepice - Krumvíř - Kurdějov - Ladná - Lanžhot - Lednice - Mikulov - Milovice - Moravská Nová Ves - Moravský Žižkov - Morkůvky - Němčičky - Nikolčice - Novosedly - Nový Přerov - Pavlov - Perná - Podivín - Popice - Pouzdřany - Přítluky - Rakvice - Šakvice - Sedlec - Šitbořice - Starovice - Starovičky - Strachotín - Tvrdonice - Týnec - Uherčice - Valtice - Velké Bílovice - Velké Hostěrádky - Velké Němčice - Velké Pavlovice - Vrbice - Zaječí

== Geography ==
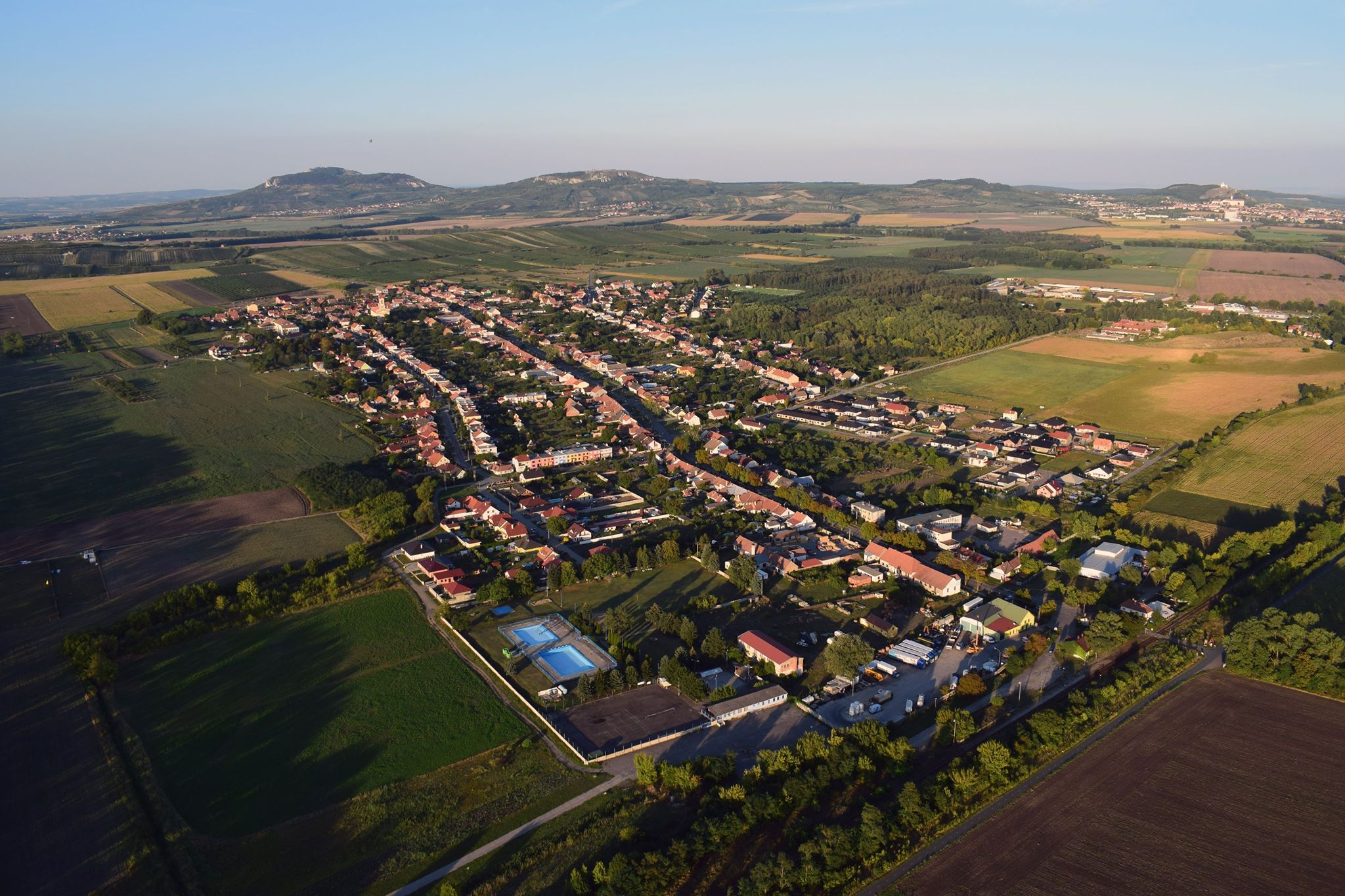
Březí and surrounding landscape

Břeclav District borders Austria in the south and Slovakia in the southeast. The territory of the district is predominantly lowland and belongs to the warmest areas in the country. The territory extends into five geomorphological mesoregions: Lower Morava Valley (most of the territory), Mikulov Highlands (southwest), Dyje–Svratka Valley (west), Ždánice Forest (north) and Kyjov Hills (small part in the northeast). The highest point of the district is the mountain Děvín in Pavlov with an elevation of 550 m (1,804 ft). The lowest point of the district and entire South Moravian Region is the confluence of the Morava and Thaya rivers in Lanžhot at 150 m (492 ft).

From the total district area of 1,038.0 km^{2} (400.8 sq mi), agricultural land occupies 682.0 km^{2} (263.3 sq mi), forests occupy 177.9 km^{2} (68.7 sq mi), and water area occupies 54.5 km^{2} (21.0 sq mi). Forests cover 17.1% of the district's area.

The longest river in the area is the Morava, which forms the Czech–Slovak border. However, the most important river for the district is the Thaya, which flows across the territory from northwest to south and briefly forms the Czech–Austrian border before the confluence with the Morava. The Kyjovka flows to the Thaya through the southeastern part of the district. The Svratka crosses the district in the northwest, otherwise there are no major rivers in the northern part of the district.

Most of the Nové Mlýny reservoirs lie in the district and are the largest body of water of the district. On the Včelínek Stream is a system of several large ponds, including Nesyt, which belongs to the largest ponds in the country.

Pálava Protected Landscape Area is a protected area that lies entirely in the district.

== Demographics ==
Historical population

Year	Pop.	±%
1869	87,446	—
1880	98,274	+12.4%
1890	103,914	+5.7%
1900	108,802	+4.7%
1910	114,818	+5.5%

Year	Pop.	±%
1921	118,127	+2.9%
1930	121,195	+2.6%
1950	99,560	−17.9%
1961	107,370	+7.8%
1970	107,300	−0.1%

Year	Pop.	±%
1980	113,235	+5.5%
1991	113,261	+0.0%
2001	114,197	+0.8%
2011	112,828	−1.2%
2021	113,651	+0.7%

Source: Censuses

=== Most populous municipalities ===
Name	Population	Area (km^{2})
Břeclav	24,583	77
Mikulov	7,552	45
Hustopeče	6,391	25
Velké Bílovice	3,862	26
Lanžhot	3,625	55
Valtice	3,568	48
Velké Pavlovice	3,112	23
Podivín	2,912	18
Moravská Nová Ves	2,690	23
Klobouky u Brna	2,471	31

== Economy ==
The largest employers with headquarters in Břeclav District and at least 500 employees are:

Economic entity	Location	Number of employees	Main activity
Břeclav Hospital	Břeclav	1,000–1,499	Health care
Gebauer a Griller Kabeltechnik	Mikulov	500–999	Manufacture of electric wires and cables
Otis	Břeclav	500–999	Manufacture of elevators and escalators
Signum	Hustopeče	500–999	Treatment and coating of metals
Jednota, spotřební družstvo v Mikulově	Mikulov	500–999	Retail sale

== Transport ==
The D2 motorway from Brno to the Czech–Slovak border, which is part of the European route E65, runs across the district.

== Sights ==
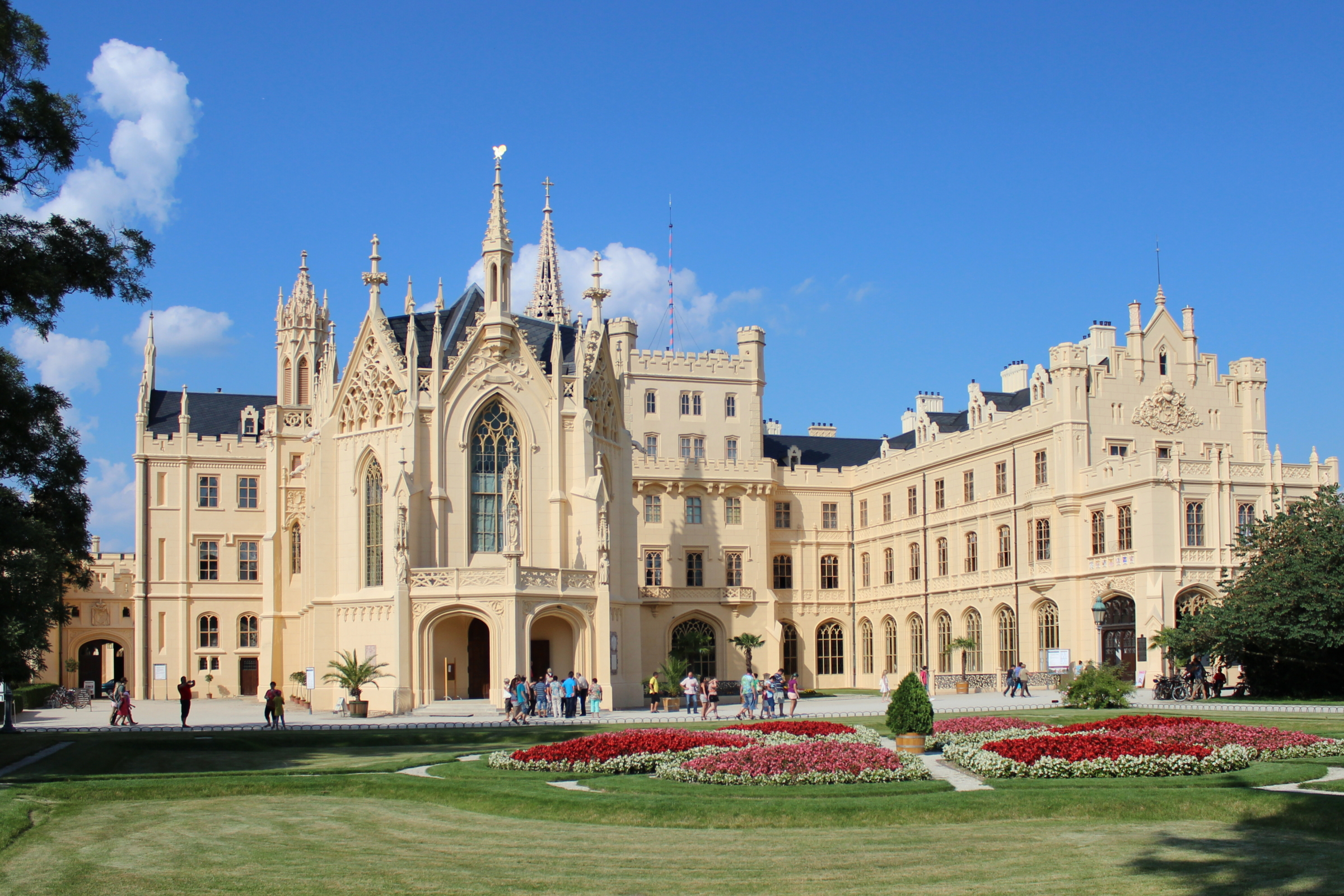
Lednice Castle

The village of Lednice–Valtice Cultural Landscape was designated a UNESCO World Heritage Site in 1996 because of its unique mix of Baroque, Neoclassical, and neo-Gothic architecture, and its history as a cultural landscape designed intentionally by a single family.

The most important monuments in the district, protected as national cultural monuments, are:

- Lednice Castle
- Valtice Castle
- Dolní Věstonice archaeological site
- Pavlov archaeological site
- Vineyard house No. 145 in Pavlov
- The hill Svatý kopeček in Mikulov with the pilgrimage chapel of St. Sebastian

The best-preserved settlements and landscapes, protected as monument reservations and monument zones, are:

- Břeclav-Pohansko (monument reservation)
- Mikulov (monument reservation)
- Lednice–Valtice Cultural Landscape (monument reservation)
- Pavlov (monument reservation)
- Valtice (monument zone)

The most visited tourist destinations are the Lednice Castle and the hill Svatý kopeček.
