= Moravský Žižkov =

- Municipality
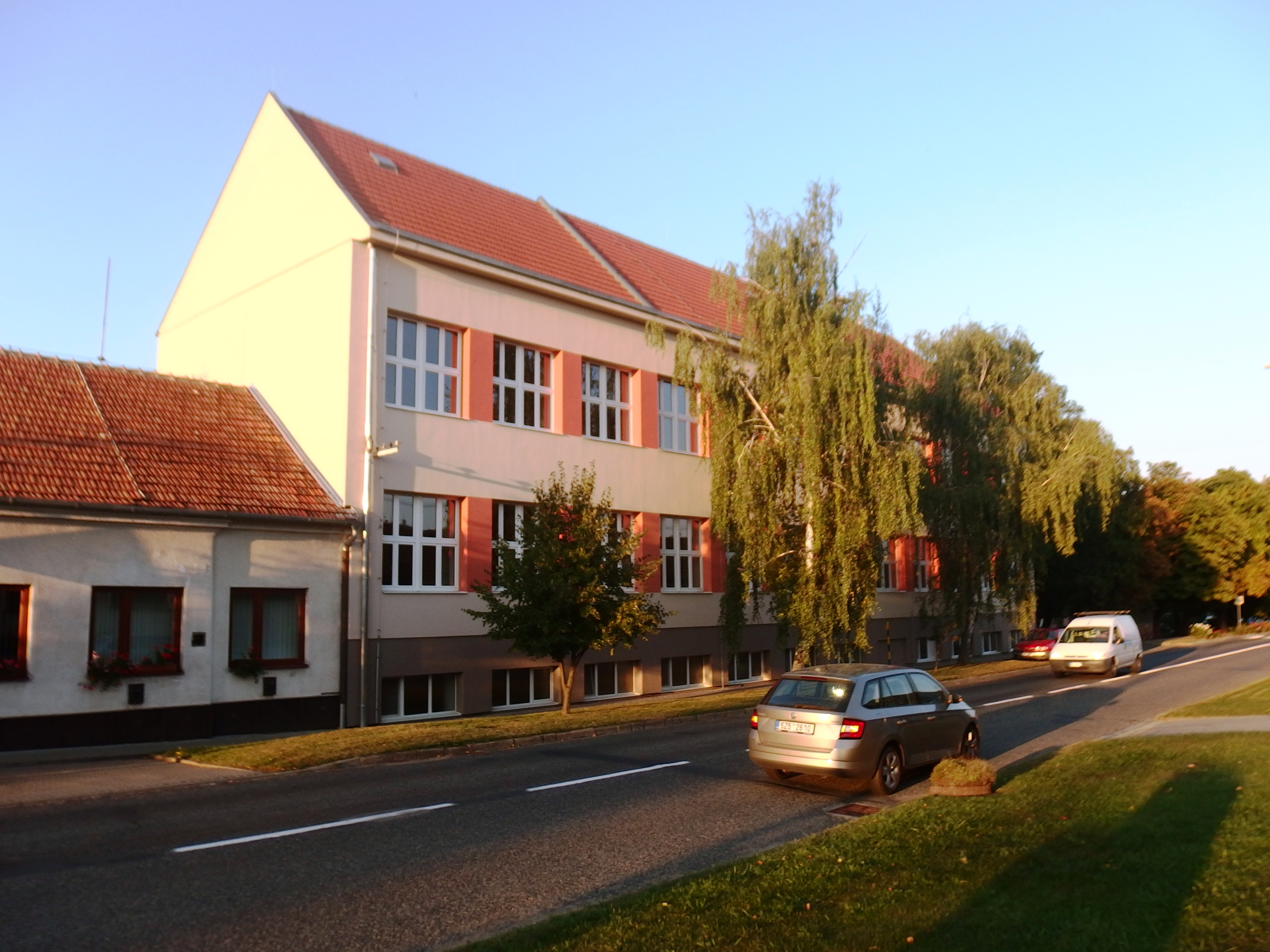
- Primary school

- Flag Coat of arms

- Location in the Czech Republic
- Coordinates: 48°49′58″N 16°55′53″E
- Country: Czech Republic
- Region: South Moravian
- District: Břeclav
- Founded: 1731

Area
  - Total: 13.54 km^{2} (5.23 sq mi)
- Elevation: 198 m (650 ft)

Population (2026-01-01)
  - Total: 1,521
  - Density: 112.3/km^{2} (290.9/sq mi)
- Time zone: UTC+1 (CET)
  - Summer (DST): UTC+2 (CEST)
- Postal code: 691 01
- Website: www.moravskyzizkov.cz

Moravský Žižkov is a municipality and village in Břeclav District in the South Moravian Region of the Czech Republic. It has about 1,500 inhabitants.

== Etymology ==
The name Žižkov is derived from the name of the inspector of the Liechtenstein estate, Jan Maxmilián Žižka.

== Geography ==
Moravský Žižkov is located about 8 kilometres (5 mi) north of Břeclav and 45 km (28 mi) southeast of Brno. It lies mostly in the Lower Morava Valley, The northern part of the municipal territory lies in the Kyjov Hills and includes the highest point of Moravský Žižkov at 260 m (853 ft) above sea level.

== History ==
Founded in 1731, Moravský Žižkov is one of the youngest communities of the South Moravian Region. It was a part of Velké Bílovice until 1792, when it became an independent municipality.

== Demographics ==
Historical population

Year	Pop.	±%
1869	579	—
1880	690	+19.2%
1890	763	+10.6%
1900	861	+12.8%
1910	935	+8.6%

Year	Pop.	±%
1921	1,012	+8.2%
1930	1,112	+9.9%
1950	1,144	+2.9%
1961	1,444	+26.2%
1970	1,467	+1.6%

Year	Pop.	±%
1980	1,460	−0.5%
1991	1,415	−3.1%
2001	1,416	+0.1%
2011	1,380	−2.5%
2021	1,400	+1.4%

Source: Censuses

== Economy ==
Moravský Žižkov is known for viticulture. It lies in the Velkopavlovická wine subregion.

== Transport ==
There are no railways or major roads passing through the municipality.

== Sights ==
The main landmark of Moravský Žižkov is the Church of Our Lady Victorious. It is a modern church, built in 2000–2002.
