= Březí (Břeclav District) =

- Municipality
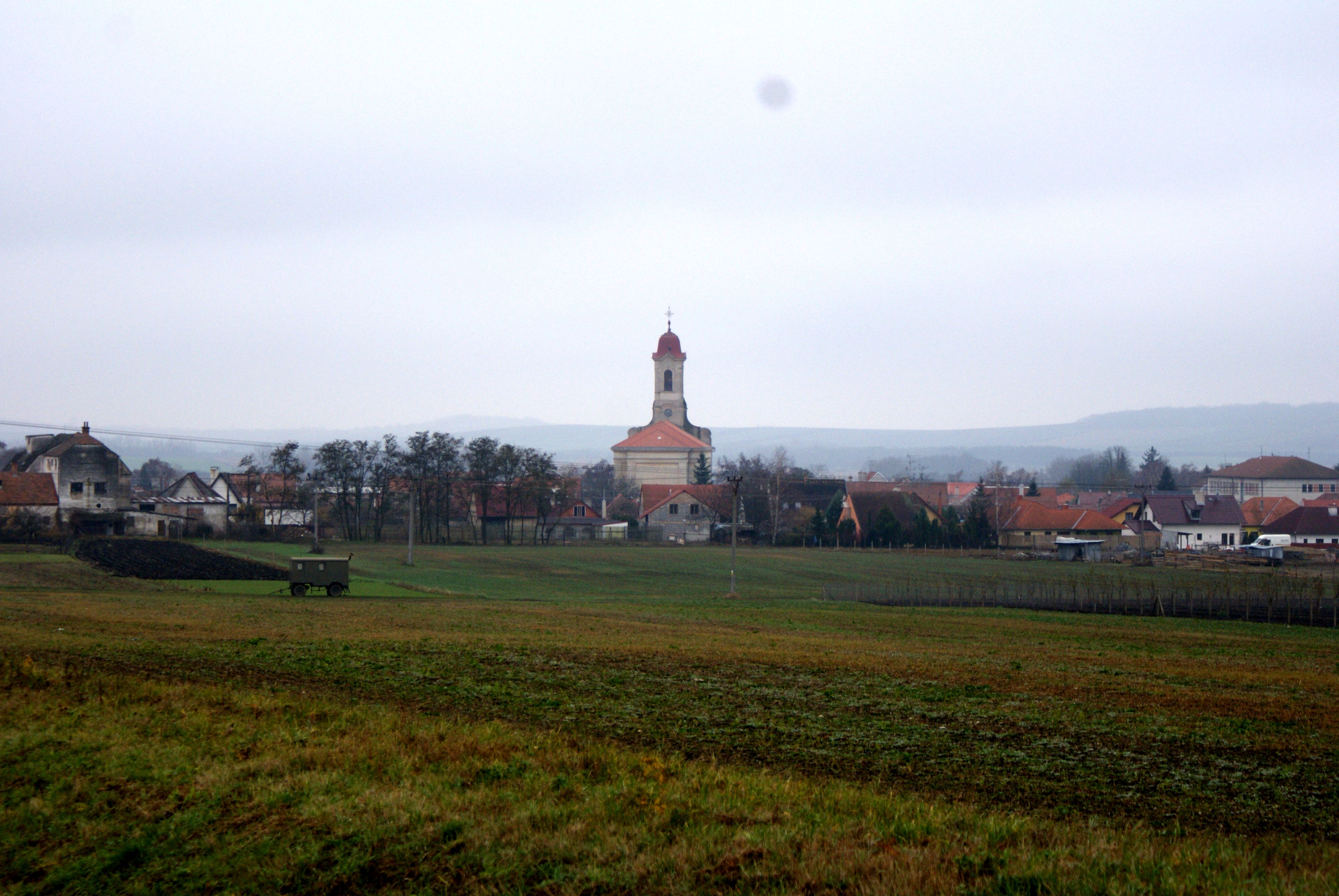
- View towards Březí

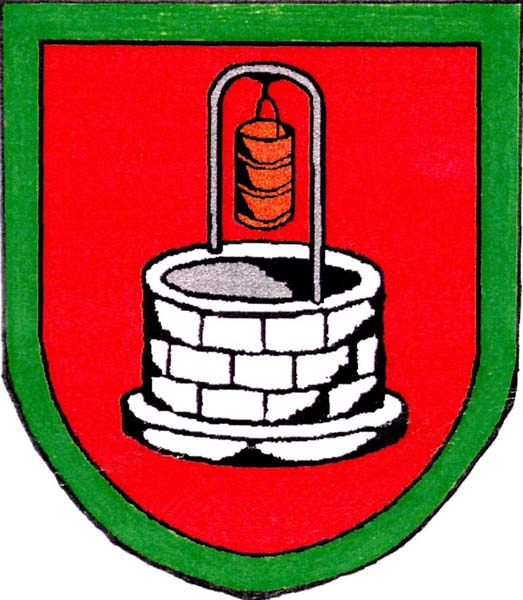
- Flag Coat of arms

- Location in the Czech Republic
- Coordinates: 48°49′10″N 16°34′3″E
- Country: Czech Republic
- Region: South Moravian
- District: Břeclav
- First mentioned: 1249

Area
  - Total: 13.09 km^{2} (5.05 sq mi)
- Elevation: 191 m (627 ft)

Population (2026-01-01)
  - Total: 1,840
  - Density: 141/km^{2} (364/sq mi)
- Time zone: UTC+1 (CET)
  - Summer (DST): UTC+2 (CEST)
- Postal code: 691 81
- Website: www.breziumikulova.cz

Březí (until 1949 Prátlsbrun; German: Bratelsbrunn) is a municipality and village in Břeclav District in the South Moravian Region of the Czech Republic. It has about 1,800 inhabitants.

== Geography ==
Březí is located about 24 kilometres (15 mi) west of Břeclav and 40 km (25 mi) south of Brno, on the border with Austria. It lies in the Dyje–Svratka Valley. The highest point is the hill Liščí kopec at 272 m (892 ft) above sea level.

== History ==
The first written mention of Prátlsbrun is from 1249. The village was probably founded in the 11th or 12th century.

In 1949, the name of the municipality was changed to Březí.

== Demographics ==
Historical population

Year	Pop.	±%
1869	1,606	—
1880	1,702	+6.0%
1890	1,769	+3.9%
1900	1,888	+6.7%
1910	1,931	+2.3%

Year	Pop.	±%
1921	1,726	−10.6%
1930	1,757	+1.8%
1950	1,208	−31.2%
1961	1,282	+6.1%
1970	1,202	−6.2%

Year	Pop.	±%
1980	1,289	+7.2%
1991	1,523	+18.2%
2001	1,539	+1.1%
2011	1,492	−3.1%
2021	1,626	+9.0%

Source: Censuses

== Transport ==
Březí is located on the Břeclav–Znojmo railway line.

== Sights ==
The main landmark of Březí is the Church of Saint John the Baptist. It is a historicist building, which replaced an older Renaissance church.
