= Popice, Czech Republic =

Popice
- Municipality
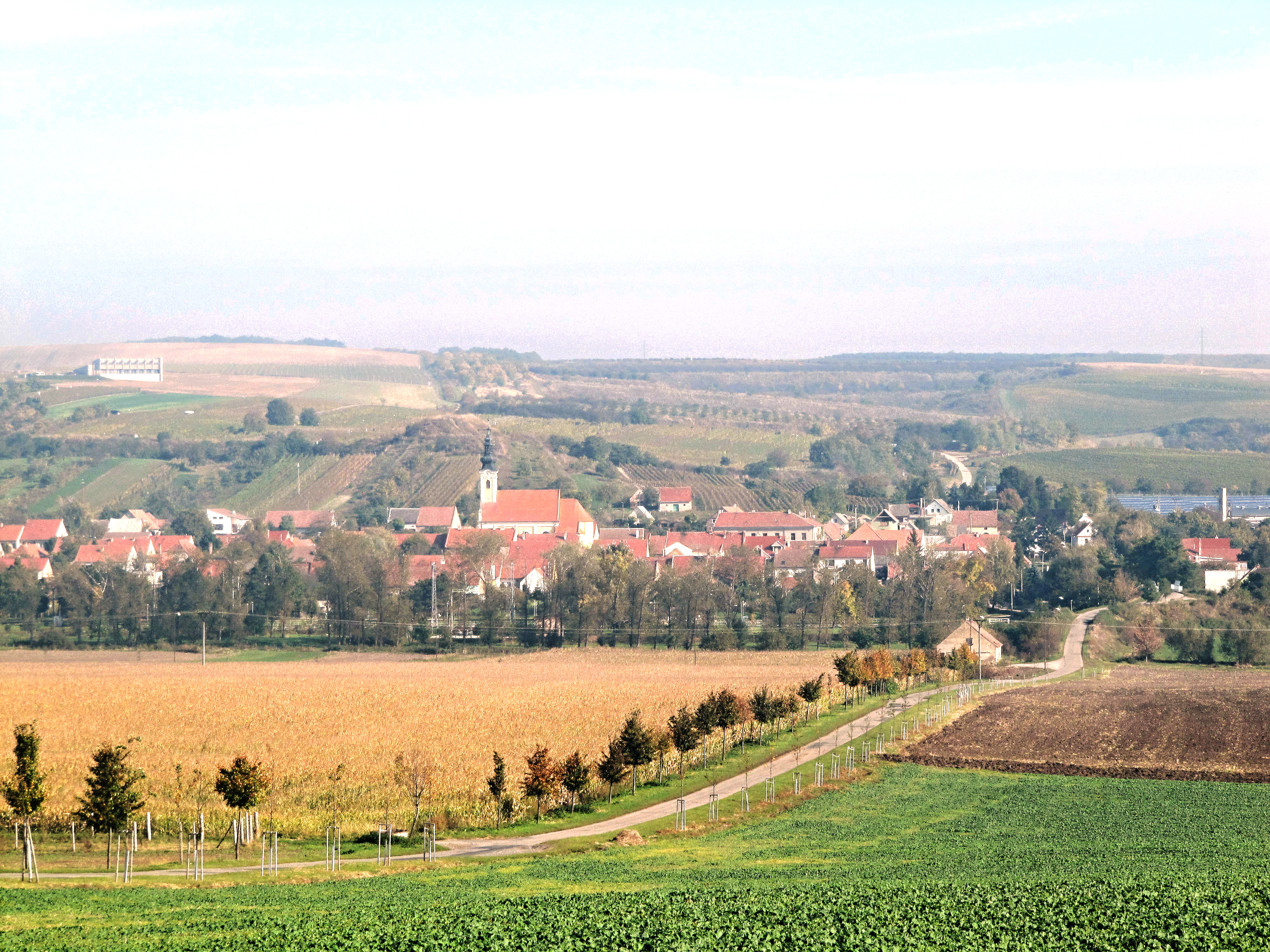
- View of Popice

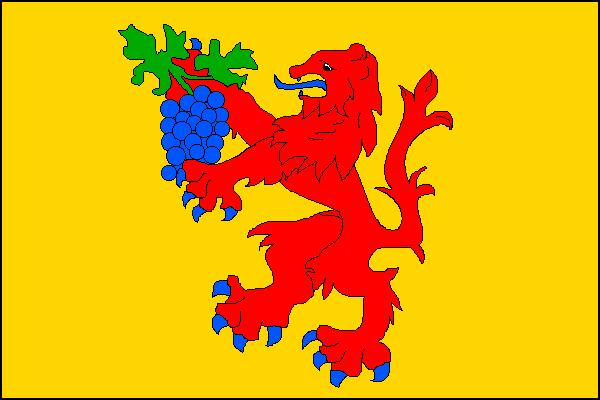
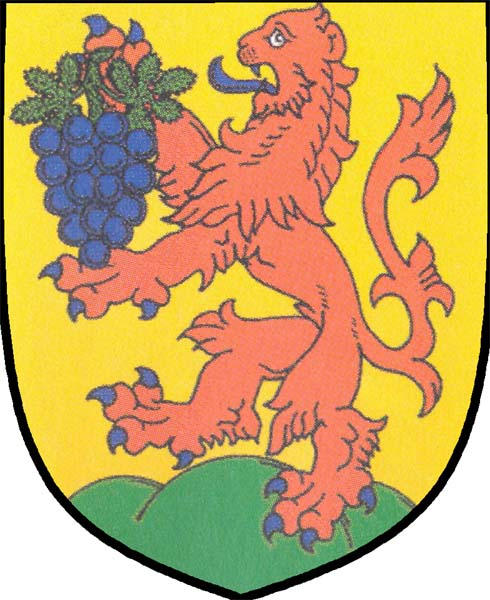
- Flag Coat of arms

- Location in the Czech Republic
- Coordinates: 48°55′38″N 16°40′0″E
- Country: Czech Republic
- Region: South Moravian
- District: Břeclav
- First mentioned: 1291

Area
  - Total: 9.99 km^{2} (3.86 sq mi)
- Elevation: 188 m (617 ft)

Population (2026-01-01)
  - Total: 1,013
  - Density: 101/km^{2} (263/sq mi)
- Time zone: UTC+1 (CET)
  - Summer (DST): UTC+2 (CEST)
- Postal code: 691 27
- Website: www.obecpopice.eu

Popice is a municipality and village in Břeclav District in the South Moravian Region of the Czech Republic. It has about 1,000 inhabitants.

Popice lies approximately 25 kilometres (16 mi) north-west of Břeclav, 31 km (19 mi) south of Brno, and 208 km (129 mi) south-east of Prague.

== History ==
The first written mention of Popice is from 1291, when the village was sold to the convent in Dolní Kounice.

== Demographics ==
Historical population
Year	Pop.	±%
1869	1,361	—
1880	1,421	+4.4%
1890	1,478	+4.0%
1900	1,359	−8.1%
1910	1,366	+0.5%
1921	1,369	+0.2%
1930	1,376	+0.5%
1950	979	−28.9%
1961	983	+0.4%
1970	952	−3.2%
1980	947	−0.5%
1991	952	+0.5%
2001	962	+1.1%
2011	974	+1.2%
2021	973	−0.1%
Source: Censuses
