= Borkovany =

- Municipality
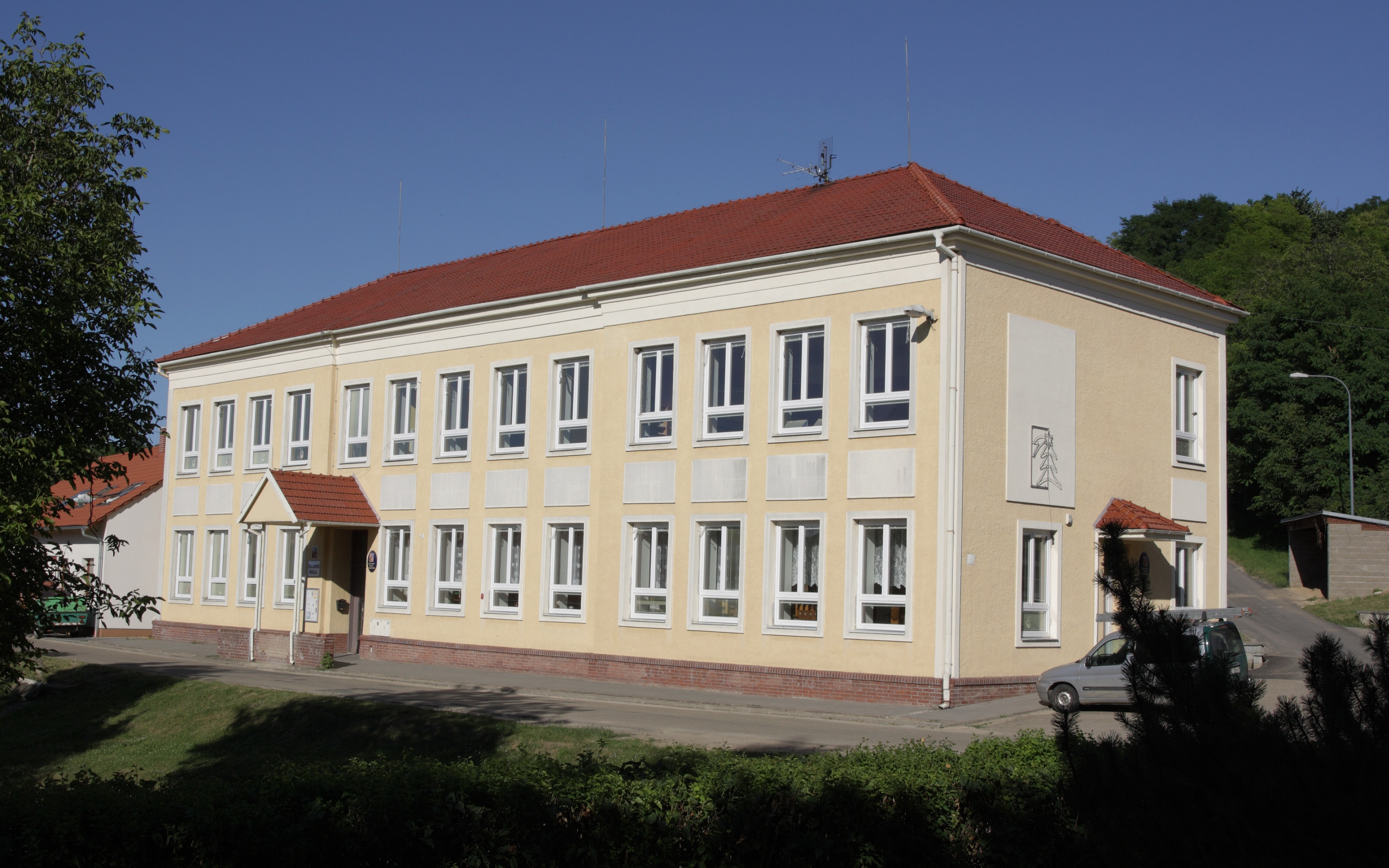
- School and municipal office

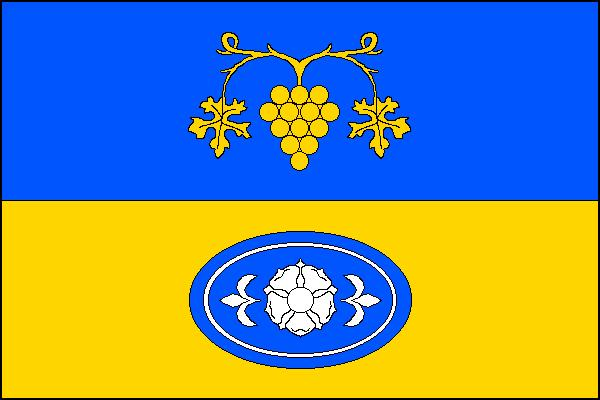
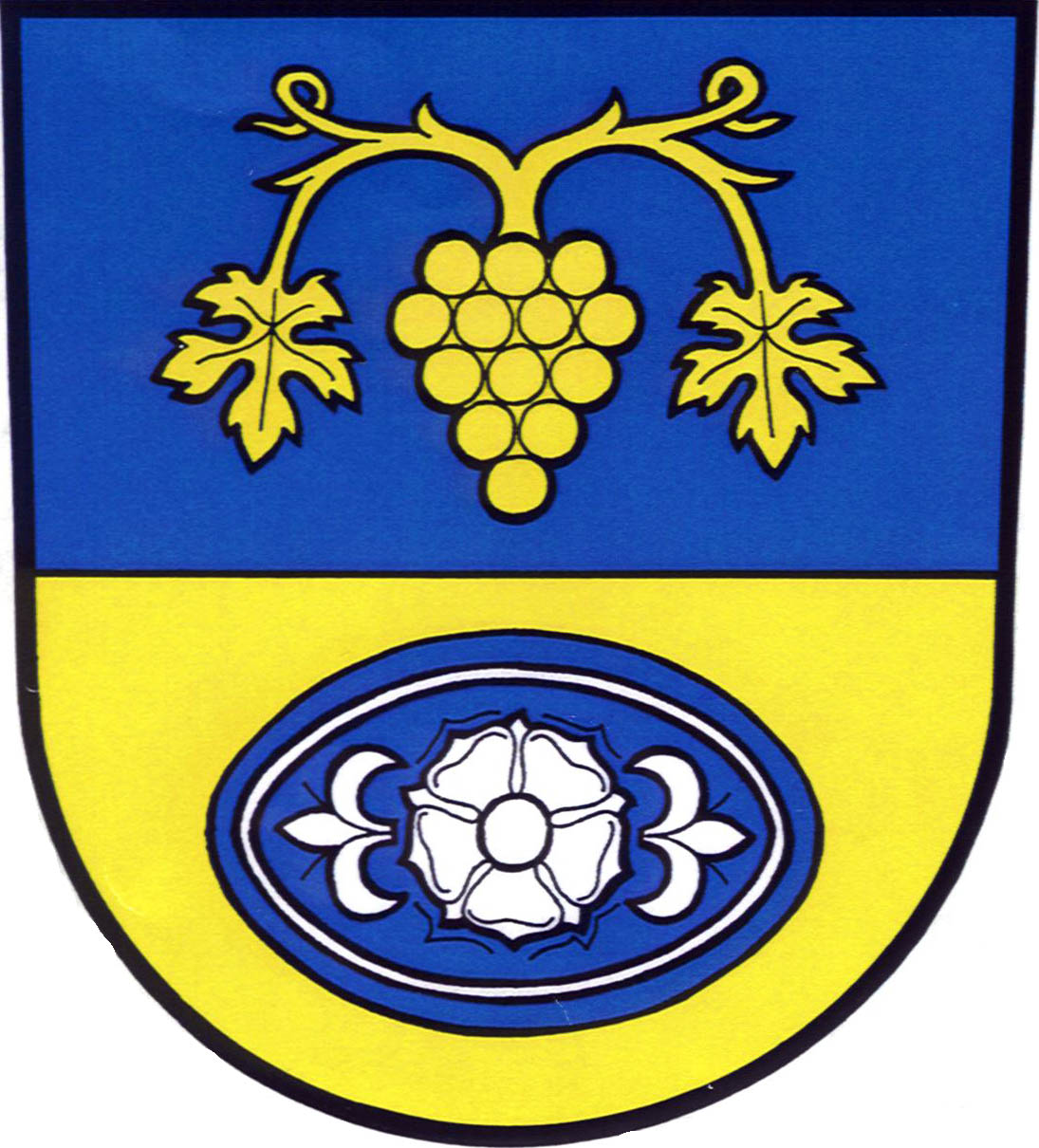
- Flag Coat of arms

- Location in the Czech Republic
- Coordinates: 49°1′41″N 16°48′36″E
- Country: Czech Republic
- Region: South Moravian
- District: Břeclav
- First mentioned: 1210

Area
  - Total: 13.94 km^{2} (5.38 sq mi)
- Elevation: 268 m (879 ft)

Population (2026-01-01)
  - Total: 829
  - Density: 59.5/km^{2} (154/sq mi)
- Time zone: UTC+1 (CET)
  - Summer (DST): UTC+2 (CEST)
- Postal code: 691 75
- Website: www.borkovany.cz

Borkovany is a municipality and village in Břeclav District in the South Moravian Region of the Czech Republic. It has about 800 inhabitants.

== Demographics ==
Historical population
Year	Pop.	±%
1869	1,186	—
1880	1,214	+2.4%
1890	1,189	−2.1%
1900	1,287	+8.2%
1910	1,305	+1.4%
1921	1,363	+4.4%
1930	1,373	+0.7%
1950	1,166	−15.1%
1961	1,132	−2.9%
1970	1,078	−4.8%
1980	919	−14.7%
1991	804	−12.5%
2001	733	−8.8%
2011	749	+2.2%
2021	834	+11.3%
Source: Censuses
