= Starovice =

- Municipality
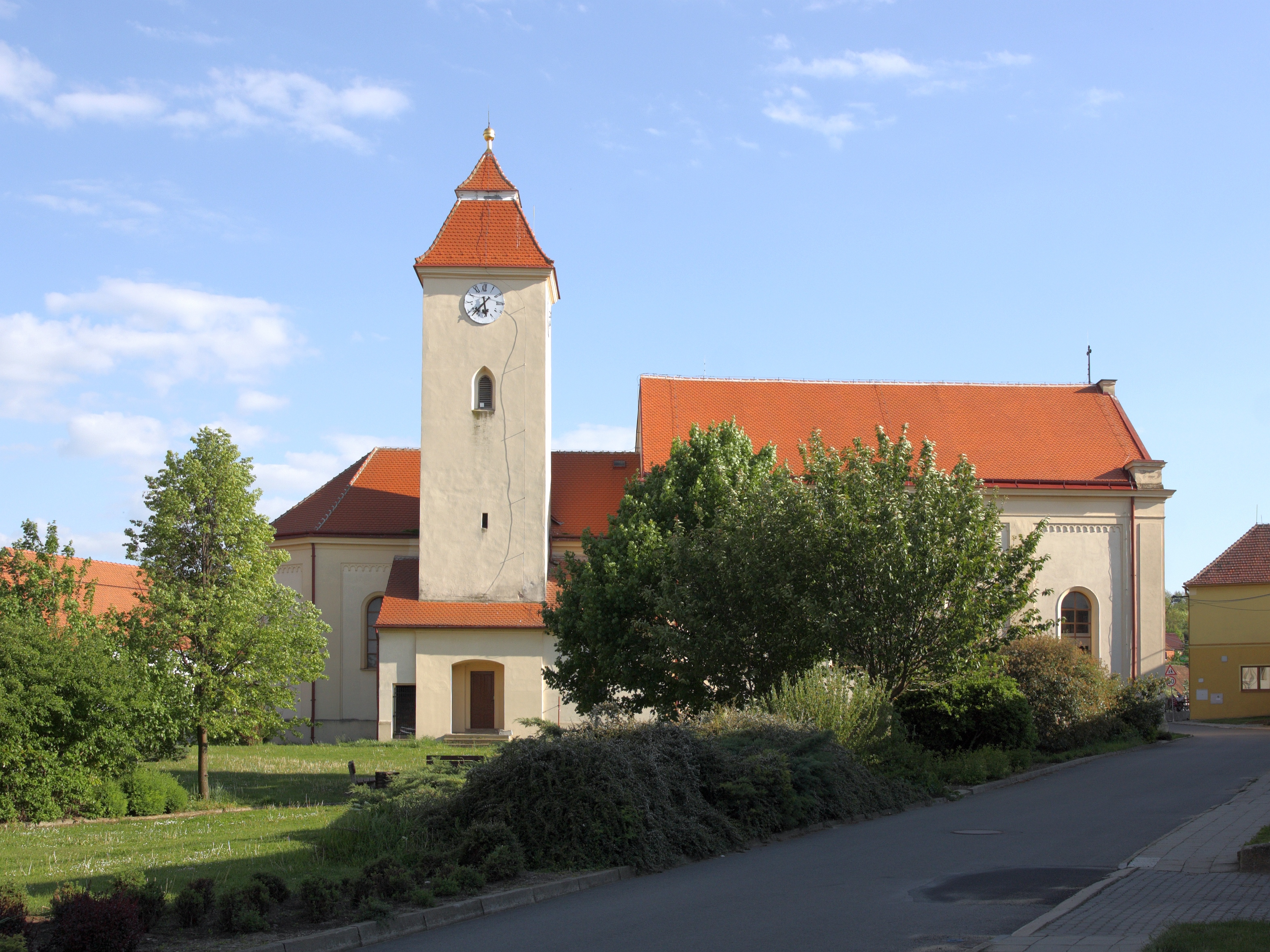
- Church of Saint George

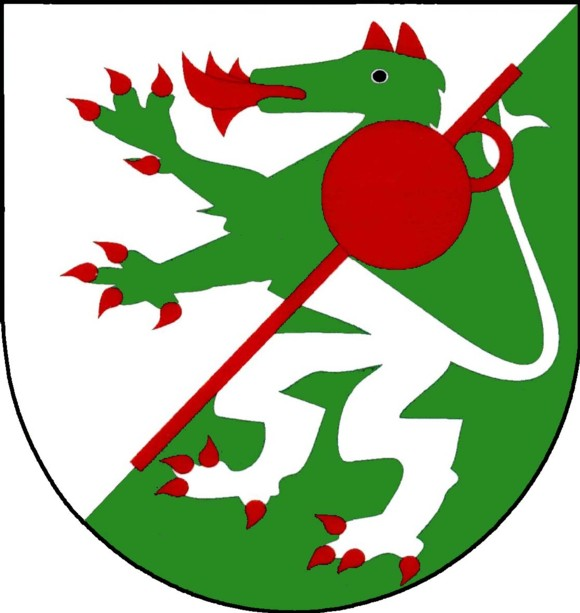
- Flag Coat of arms

- Location in the Czech Republic
- Coordinates: 48°57′6″N 16°42′24″E
- Country: Czech Republic
- Region: South Moravian
- District: Břeclav
- First mentioned: 1322

Area
  - Total: 8.19 km^{2} (3.16 sq mi)
- Elevation: 198 m (650 ft)

Population (2026-01-01)
  - Total: 1,008
  - Density: 123/km^{2} (319/sq mi)
- Time zone: UTC+1 (CET)
  - Summer (DST): UTC+2 (CEST)
- Postal code: 693 01
- Website: www.starovice.cz

Starovice (German: Gross Steurowitz) is a municipality and village in Břeclav District in the South Moravian Region of the Czech Republic. It has about 1,000 inhabitants.

Starovice lies approximately 26 kilometres (16 mi) north-west of Břeclav, 29 km (18 mi) south of Brno, and 208 km (129 mi) south-east of Prague.

== Demographics ==
Historical population
Year	Pop.	±%
1869	1,130	—
1880	1,194	+5.7%
1890	1,260	+5.5%
1900	1,235	−2.0%
1910	1,180	−4.5%
1921	1,109	−6.0%
1930	1,102	−0.6%
1950	742	−32.7%
1961	752	+1.3%
1970	711	−5.5%
1980	726	+2.1%
1991	677	−6.7%
2001	743	+9.7%
2011	834	+12.2%
2021	888	+6.5%
Source: Censuses
