= Přítluky =

- Municipality
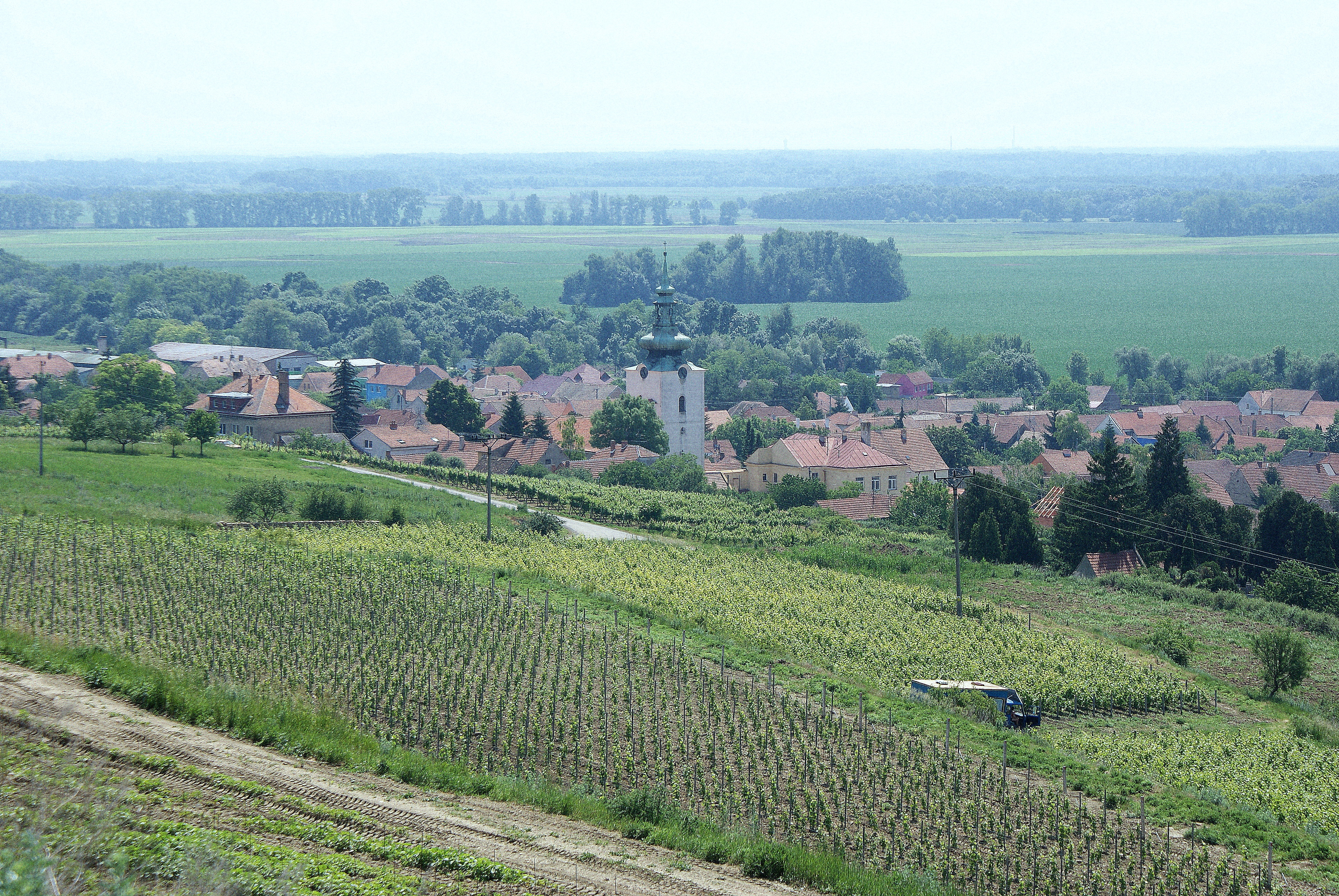
- General view

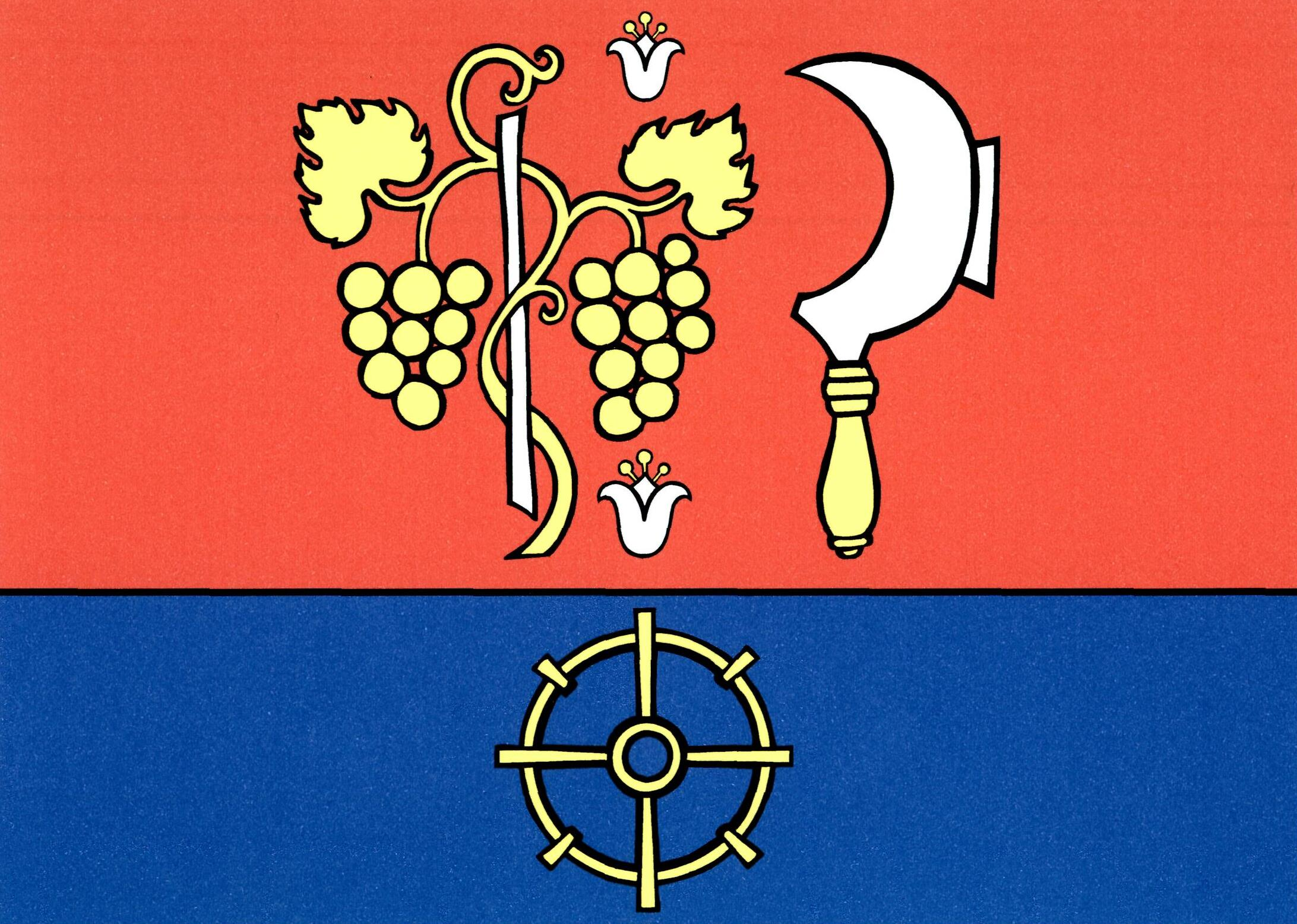
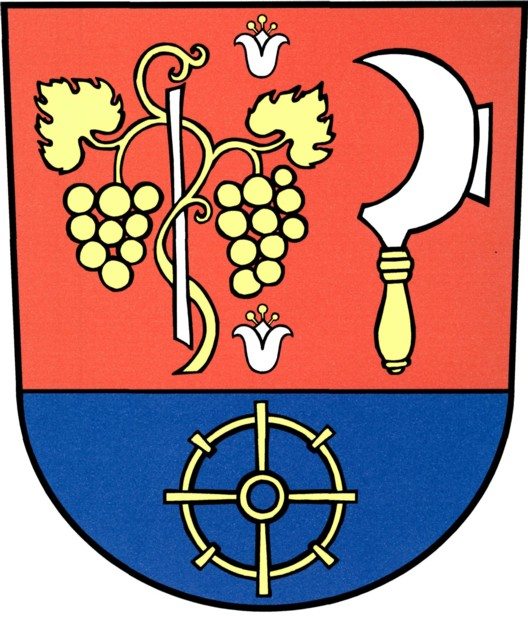
- Flag Coat of arms

- Location in the Czech Republic
- Coordinates: 48°51′18″N 16°46′26″E
- Country: Czech Republic
- Region: South Moravian
- District: Břeclav
- First mentioned: 1222

Area
  - Total: 14.31 km^{2} (5.53 sq mi)
- Elevation: 165 m (541 ft)

Population (2026-01-01)
  - Total: 767
  - Density: 53.6/km^{2} (139/sq mi)
- Time zone: UTC+1 (CET)
  - Summer (DST): UTC+2 (CEST)
- Postal codes: 691 04, 692 01
- Website: www.pritluky.cz

Přítluky (German: Prittlach) is a municipality and village in Břeclav District in the South Moravian Region of the Czech Republic. It has about 800 inhabitants.

== Administrative division ==
Přítluky consists of two municipal parts (in brackets population according to the 2021 census):

- Přítluky (614)
- Nové Mlýny (126)

Nové Mlýny forms an exclave of the municipal territory.

== Geography ==
Přítluky is located about 13 kilometres (8 mi) northwest of Břeclav and 38 km (24 mi) south of Brno. It lies in the Lower Morava Valley. The municipality is situated on the left bank of the Thaya river. The village of Nové Mlýny lies on shores of the Nové Mlýny reservoirs, which are named after this village.

== History ==
The first written mention of Přítluky is from 1222, when the parish church was mentioned.

== Demographics ==
Historical population

Year	Pop.	±%
1869	1,074	—
1880	1,188	+10.6%
1890	1,101	−7.3%
1900	1,137	+3.3%
1910	1,116	−1.8%

Year	Pop.	±%
1921	1,084	−2.9%
1930	1,071	−1.2%
1950	888	−17.1%
1961	926	+4.3%
1970	866	−6.5%

Year	Pop.	±%
1980	901	+4.0%
1991	823	−8.7%
2001	775	−5.8%
2011	765	−1.3%
2021	740	−3.3%

Source: Censuses

== Economy ==
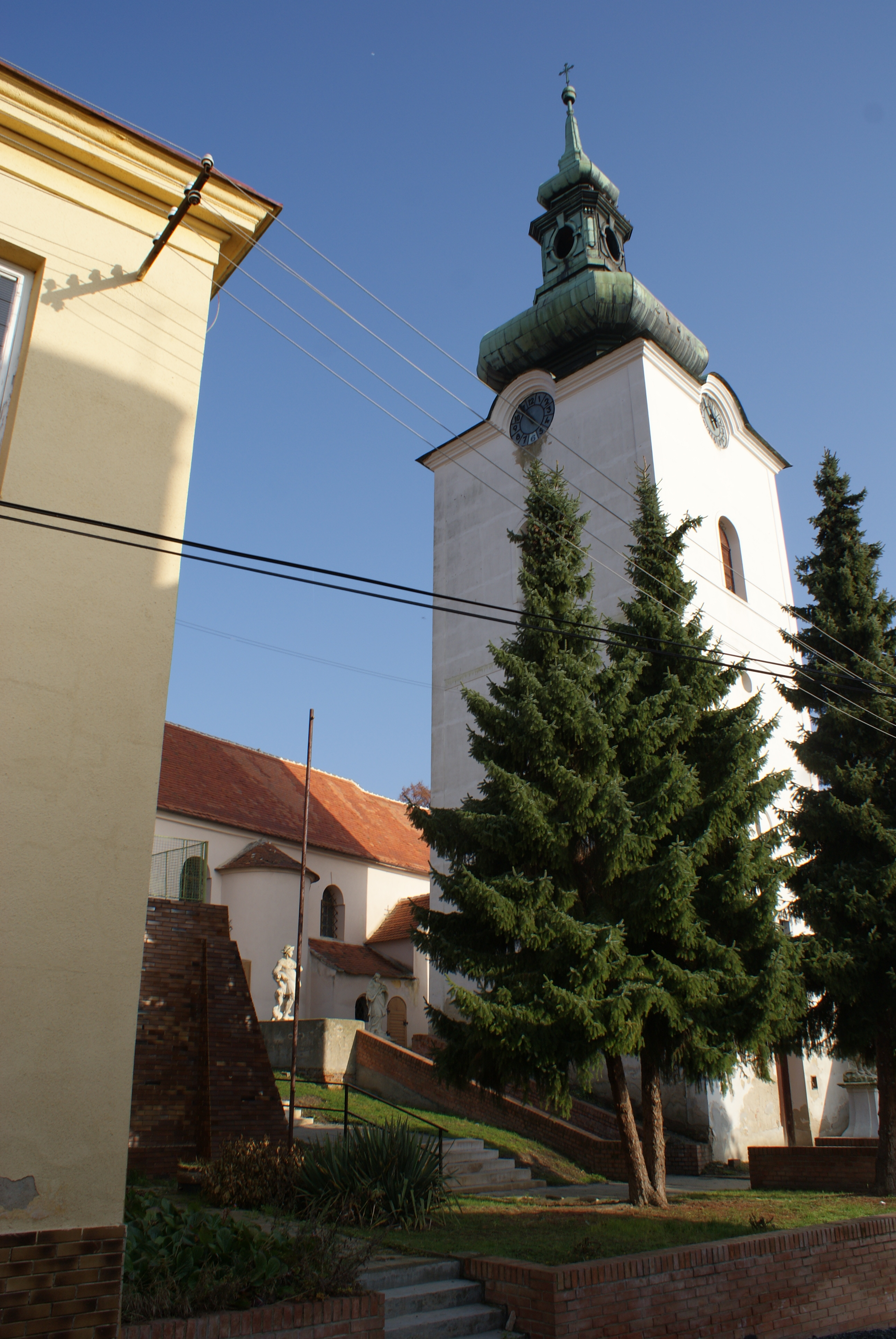
Church of Saint Margaret

Přítluky is known for viticulture. The municipality lies in the Velkopavlovická wine subregion.

== Transport ==
There are no railways or major roads passing through the municipality.

== Sights ==
The main landmark of Přítluky is the Church of Saint Margaret. The current structure was built in 1784 and has preserved Gothic elements from the older church. Next to the church is a separate tower, which was built in 1765.
