= Kašnice =

- Municipality
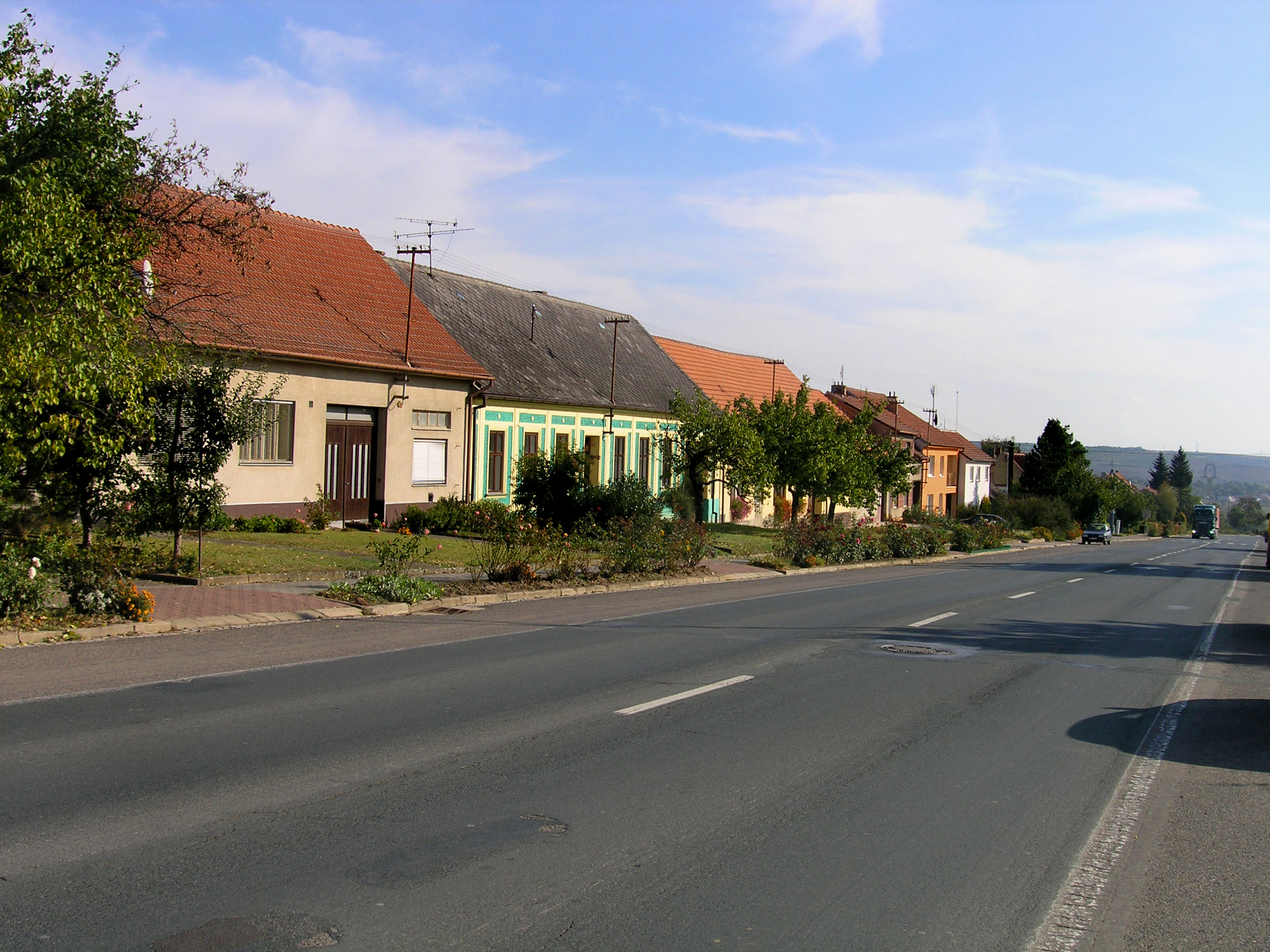
- Main street

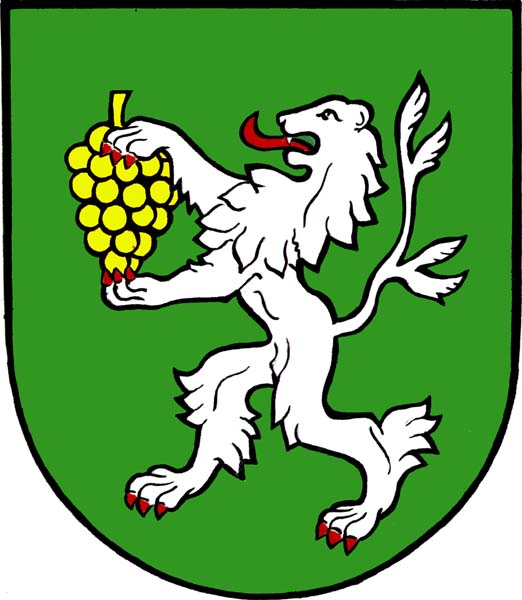
- Coat of arms

- Location in the Czech Republic
- Coordinates: 48°59′47″N 16°52′58″E
- Country: Czech Republic
- Region: South Moravian
- District: Břeclav
- Founded: 1785

Area
  - Total: 1.56 km^{2} (0.60 sq mi)
- Elevation: 215 m (705 ft)

Population (2026-01-01)
  - Total: 226
  - Density: 145/km^{2} (375/sq mi)
- Time zone: UTC+1 (CET)
  - Summer (DST): UTC+2 (CEST)
- Postal code: 691 72
- Website: www.kasnice.cz

Kašnice is a municipality and village in Břeclav District in the South Moravian Region of the Czech Republic. It has about 200 inhabitants.

Kašnice lies approximately 27 kilometres (17 mi) north of Břeclav, 30 km (19 mi) south-east of Brno, and 215 km (134 mi) south-east of Prague.

== Demographics ==
Historical population
Year	Pop.	±%
1869	180	—
1880	199	+10.6%
1890	184	−7.5%
1900	167	−9.2%
1910	196	+17.4%
1921	227	+15.8%
1930	213	−6.2%
1950	207	−2.8%
1961	235	+13.5%
1970	251	+6.8%
1980	355	+41.4%
1991	245	−31.0%
2001	219	−10.6%
2011	212	−3.2%
2021	205	−3.3%
Source: Censuses
