= Brumovice (Břeclav District) =

- Municipality
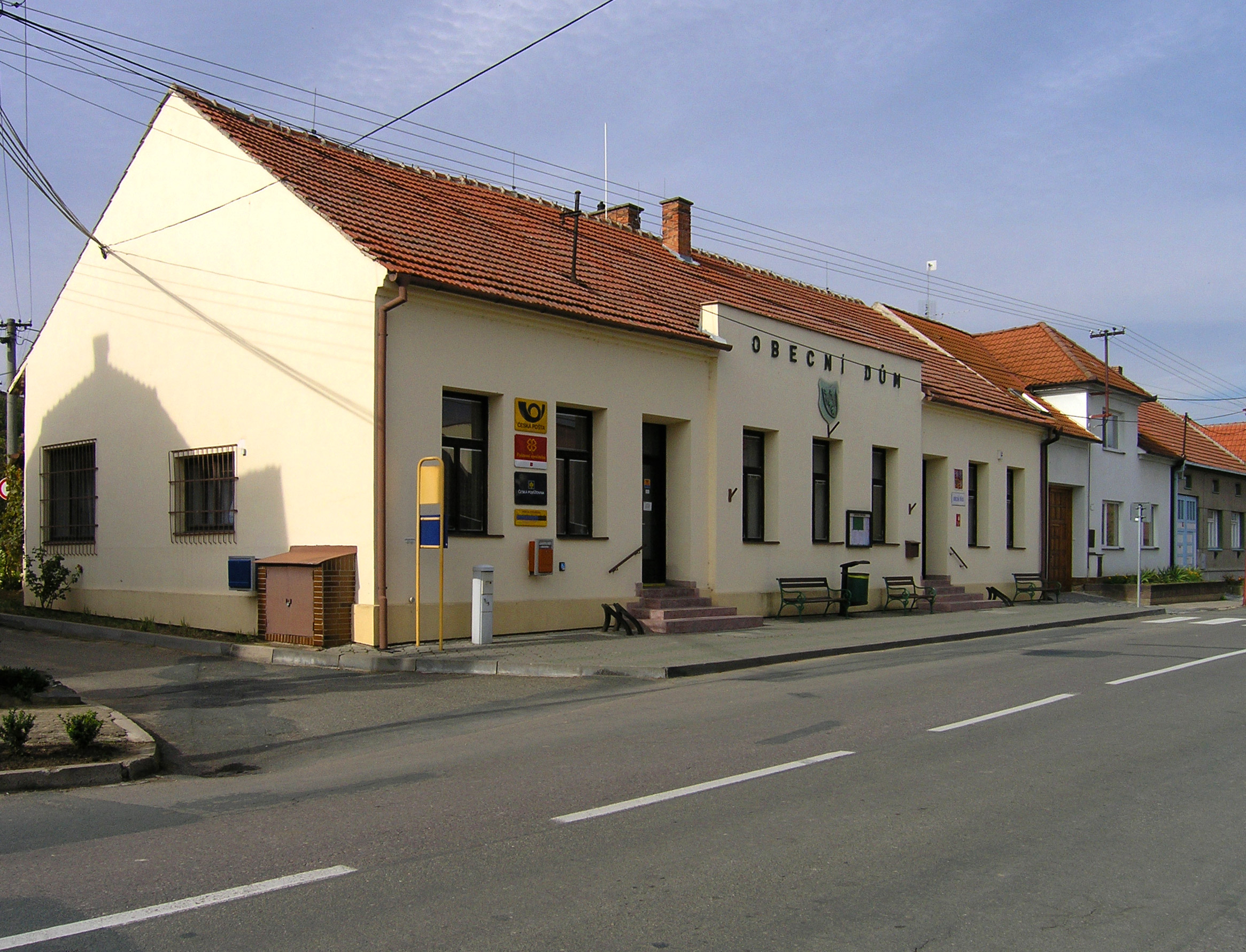
- Municipal office

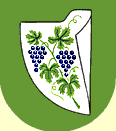
- Flag Coat of arms

- Location in the Czech Republic
- Coordinates: 48°57′39″N 16°53′46″E
- Country: Czech Republic
- Region: South Moravian
- District: Břeclav
- First mentioned: 1250

Area
  - Total: 10.51 km^{2} (4.06 sq mi)
- Elevation: 193 m (633 ft)

Population (2026-01-01)
  - Total: 995
  - Density: 94.7/km^{2} (245/sq mi)
- Time zone: UTC+1 (CET)
  - Summer (DST): UTC+2 (CEST)
- Postal code: 691 11
- Website: brumovice.cz

Brumovice is a municipality and village in Břeclav District in the South Moravian Region of the Czech Republic. It has about 1,000 inhabitants.

== Demographics ==
Historical population
Year	Pop.	±%
1869	1,082	—
1880	1,196	+10.5%
1890	1,222	+2.2%
1900	1,321	+8.1%
1910	1,370	+3.7%
1921	1,394	+1.8%
1930	1,379	−1.1%
1950	1,168	−15.3%
1961	1,212	+3.8%
1970	1,103	−9.0%
1980	1,010	−8.4%
1991	930	−7.9%
2001	944	+1.5%
2011	933	−1.2%
2021	1,005	+7.7%
Source: Censuses

== Twin towns – sister cities ==
Brumovice is twinned with:

- Záhorská Bystrica (Bratislava), Slovakia
