= Týnec (Břeclav District) =

- Municipality
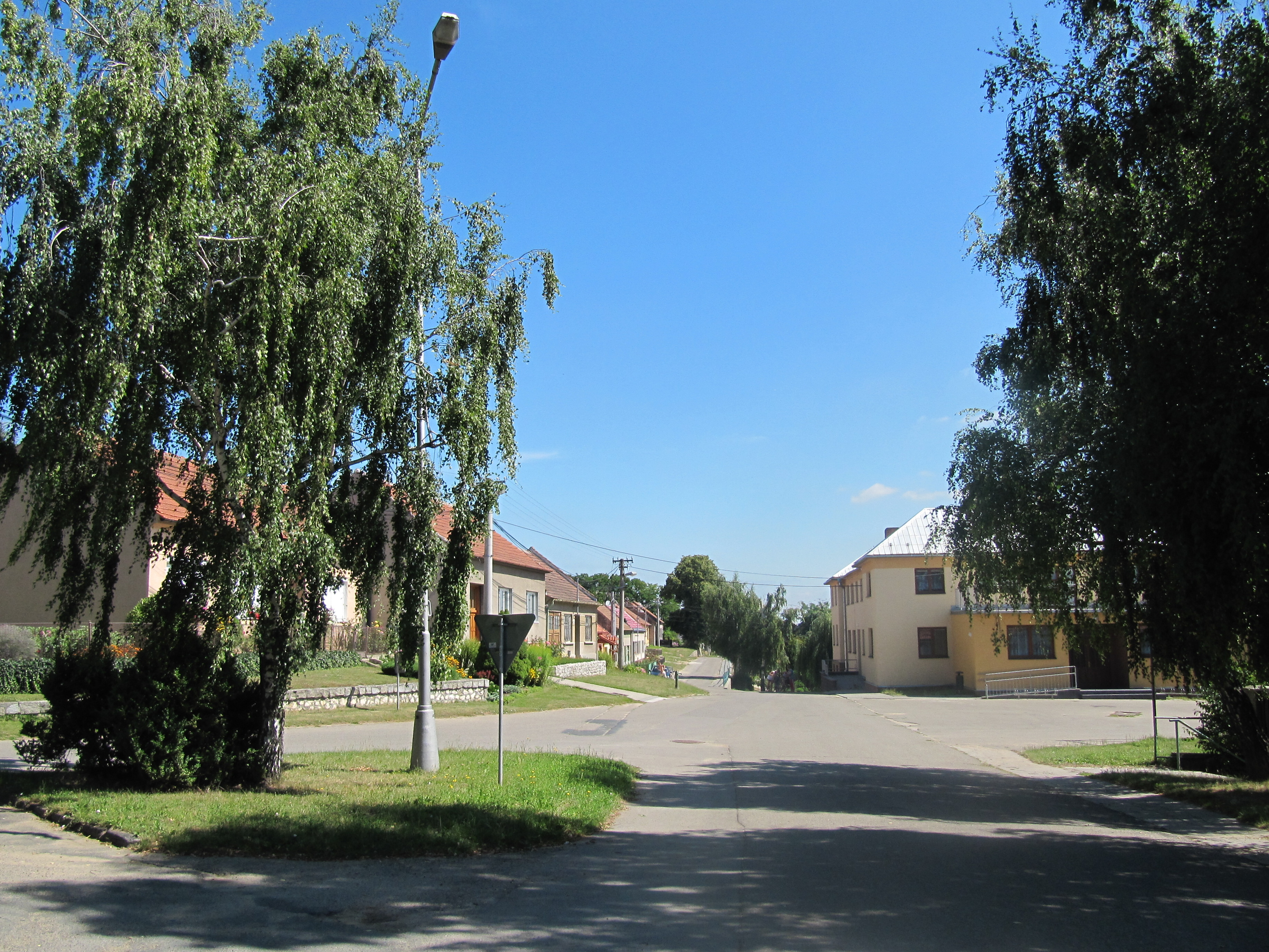
- Centre of Týnec

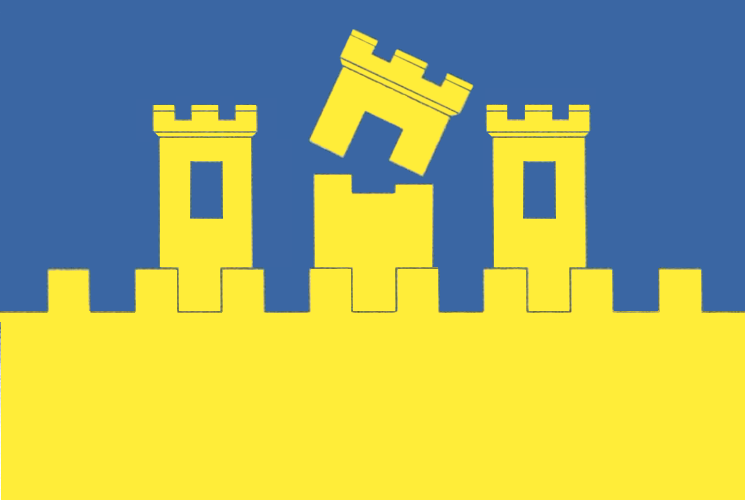
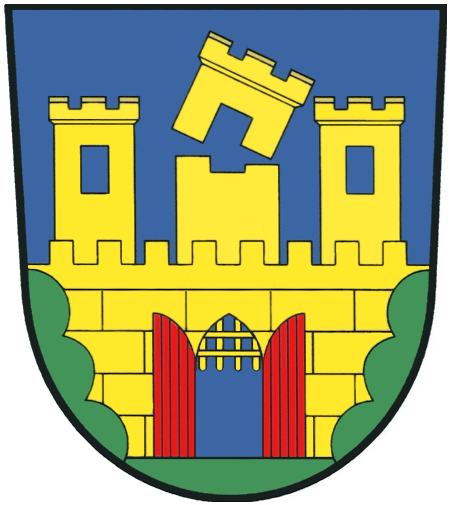
- Flag Coat of arms

- Location in the Czech Republic
- Coordinates: 48°46′46″N 17°0′48″E
- Country: Czech Republic
- Region: South Moravian
- District: Břeclav
- First mentioned: 1244

Area
  - Total: 11.60 km^{2} (4.48 sq mi)
- Elevation: 173 m (568 ft)

Population (2026-01-01)
  - Total: 1,082
  - Density: 93.28/km^{2} (241.6/sq mi)
- Time zone: UTC+1 (CET)
  - Summer (DST): UTC+2 (CEST)
- Postal code: 691 54
- Website: www.tynec.cz

Týnec is a municipality and village in Břeclav District in the South Moravian Region of the Czech Republic. It has about 1,100 inhabitants.

Týnec lies approximately 11 kilometres (7 mi) east of Břeclav, 56 km (35 mi) south-east of Brno, and 238 km (148 mi) south-east of Prague.

== Demographics ==
Historical population
Year	Pop.	±%
1869	733	—
1880	842	+14.9%
1890	930	+10.5%
1900	1,013	+8.9%
1910	1,080	+6.6%
1921	1,146	+6.1%
1930	1,125	−1.8%
1950	1,056	−6.1%
1961	1,133	+7.3%
1970	1,119	−1.2%
1980	1,066	−4.7%
1991	970	−9.0%
2001	1,016	+4.7%
2011	1,001	−1.5%
2021	1,020	+1.9%
Source: Censuses
