= Leopold Adametz =

Austrian zoologist (1861–1941)

Leopold Adametz (11 October 1861, Feldsberg – 27 January 1941, Vienna) was an Austrian zoologist. The son of a manufacturer, he studied at the University of Natural Resources and Life Sciences in Vienna and at the University of Leipzig. In 1886, he was awarded his doctorate. He became an assistant of Martin Wickens and in 1888 an assistant professor of zoology. From 1891 he was a professor in Kraków, from 1898 until 1932 he was the professor of animal product studies and the morphology of house pets at the University of Natural Resources and Life Sciences in Vienna. He was a member of the Austrian Academy of Sciences.

== Literary works ==
- Allgemeine Tierzucht, 1926
