= Valtice Wine Market =

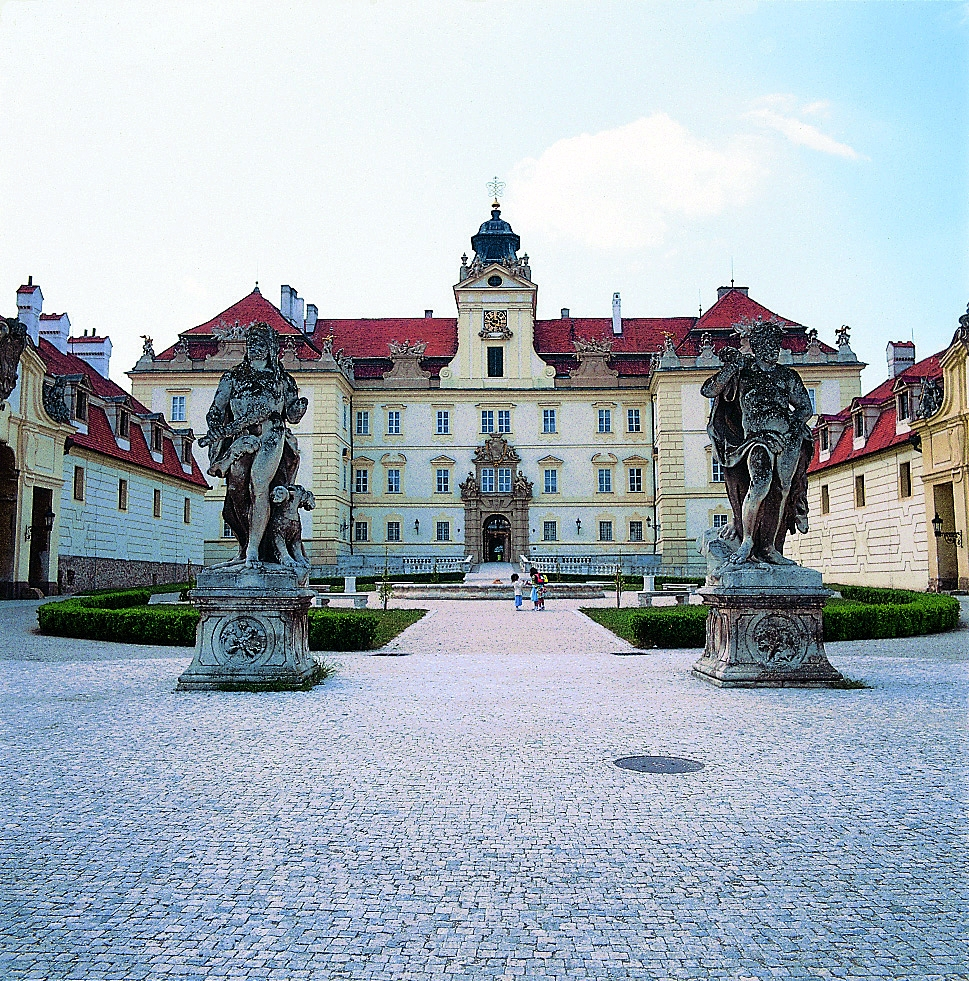
Valtice Chateau

Valtice Wine Market (Czech: Valtické vinné trhy) is a wine exhibition held annually in the Valtice Chateau riding hall at the beginning of May.

The Valtice Wine Market was first held at the end of the 19th century. The modern history of the Valtice Wine Market commenced in the year 1967, when this wine contest was held for the first time in its present fashion.

Various prizes are awarded at this show: the jury awards one gold, one silver and one bronze medal for each category or variety of wine.
