= Valtice =

- Town
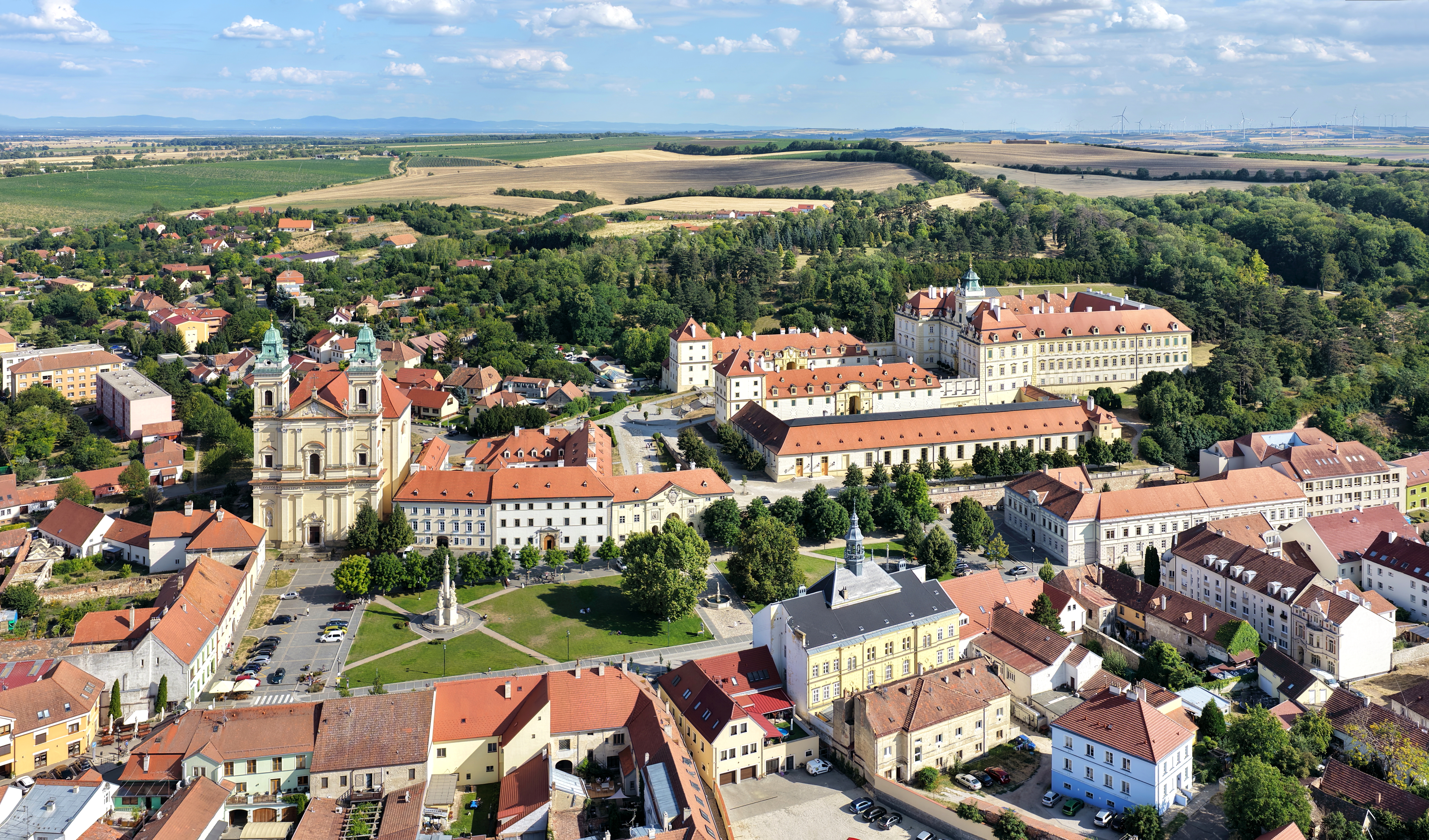
- Centre of Valtice

- Flag Coat of arms

- Location in the Czech Republic
- Coordinates: 48°44′27″N 16°45′18″E
- Country: Czech Republic
- Region: South Moravian
- District: Břeclav
- First mentioned: 1192

Government
  - Mayor: Aleš Hofman

Area
  - Total: 47.85 km^{2} (18.47 sq mi)
- Elevation: 192 m (630 ft)

Population (2026-01-01)
  - Total: 3,568
  - Density: 74.57/km^{2} (193.1/sq mi)
- Time zone: UTC+1 (CET)
  - Summer (DST): UTC+2 (CEST)
- Postal code: 691 42
- Website: www.valtice.eu

UNESCO World Heritage Site
- Official name: Lednice–Valtice Cultural Landscape
- Criteria: i, ii, iv
- Reference: 763
- Inscription: 1996 (20th Session)

Valtice (Czech pronunciation: [ˈvalcɪtsɛ]; German: Feldsberg) is a town in Břeclav District in the South Moravian Region of the Czech Republic. It has about 3,600 inhabitants. The town is located in the Lower Morava Valley, on the border with Austria.

Valtice was probably founded in the 11th century. From the 14th century, it was owned by the Liechtenstein family. Until 1919, it was a part of Lower Austria. Valtice is known as part of Lednice–Valtice Cultural Landscape, a UNESCO World Heritage Site. The historic town centre is well preserved and is protected as an urban monument zone. The main landmark of the town is the Valtice Castle.

== Administrative division ==
Valtice consists of two municipal parts (in brackets population according to the 2021 census):

- Valtice (3,353)
- Úvaly (172)

== Geography ==
Valtice is located about 10 kilometres (6 mi) west of Břeclav and 50 km (31 mi) south of Brno. It lies on the border with Austria and borders the Austrian municipality of Schrattenberg. Valtice lies in the Lower Morava Valley lowland. The highest point is the hill Chrastiny at 292 m (958 ft) above sea level.

== History ==
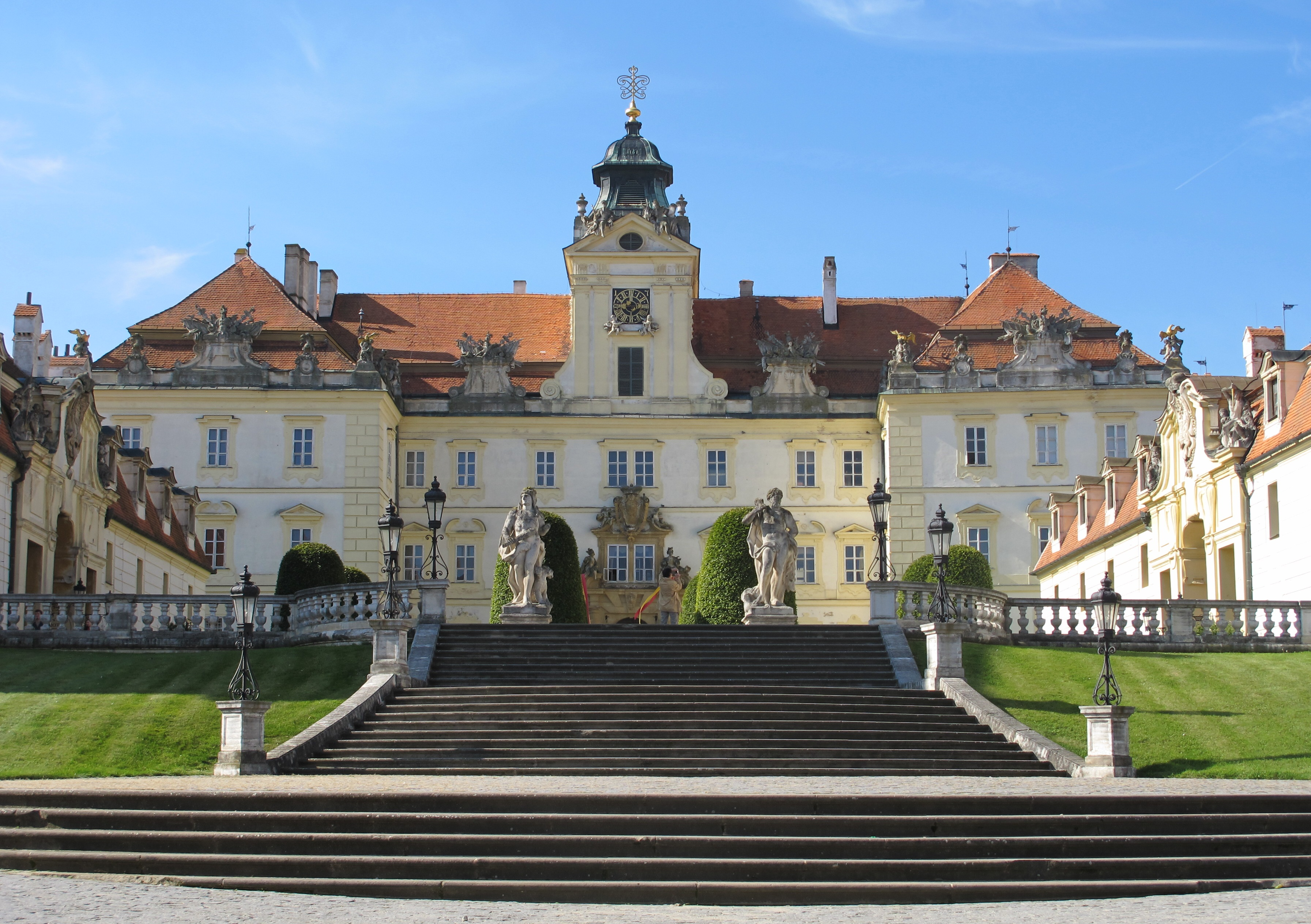
Valtice Castle

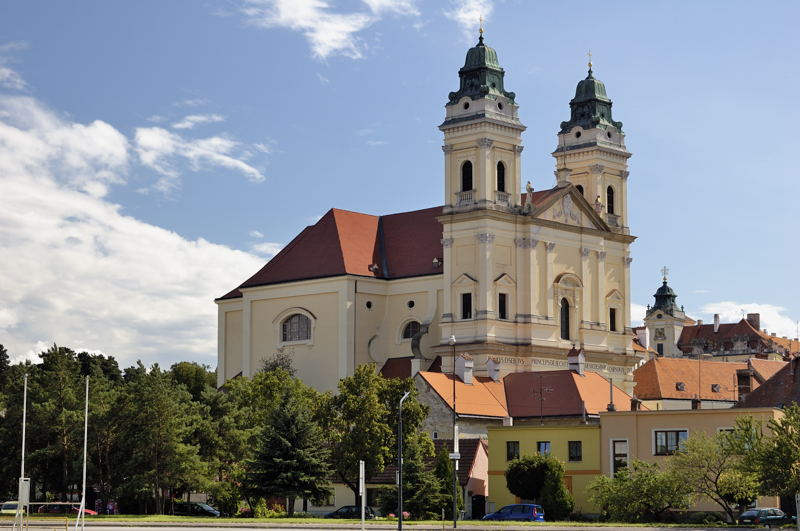
Church of the Assumption of the Virgin Mary

Valtice Castle, then part of Duchy of Austria and called Feldsberg, was probably founded in the 11th century. The first written mention of the village of Feldsberg is in a 1192 deed (as Veldesperch); held by the Lords of Seefeld, it was located close to the border with Moravia. Probably between 1192 and 1227, Feldsberg became a town. In 1270, the Lords of Seefeld died out and the estate, divided into six parts with different owners, changed hands several times. Between 1387 and 1395, the Liechtenstein family gradually acquired the entire estate.

During the Hussite Wars, the Liechtensteins were on the side of Sigismund. In 1426, the town was burned out by the Hussites. The town was again devastated by the troops of the Bohemian king George of Poděbrady in 1458 as well as in the Austrian–Hungarian War by the forces of King Matthias Corvinus in 1480. The renewal and prosperity occurred in the first half of the 16th century, during the rule of Hartman I of Liechtenstein.

In the mid 16th century, the citizens converted to Protestantism; however they were subjected to the measures of the Counter-Reformation under the rule of Karl I of Liechtenstein, who himself had converted to Catholicism in 1599. During the Thirty Years' War, the town was again plundered by the troops under the command of Gabriel Bethlen in 1619, by the troops of Henri Duval Dampierre in the same year, and later conquered by Swedish forces under General Lennart Torstensson.

After the war, the town became the principal seat of the Liechtensteins. Prince Karl Eusebius had rebuilt the castle and had built a new parish church, finished in 1671. He also issued an order to establish forests east from the town. His descendants continued his work. His son and later his nephew had extended the castle and had the monastery of the Brothers Hospitallers built. The overall appearance of the town changed greatly between 1648 and 1781.

Until the end of World War I, the town belonged to Lower Austria. According to the 1919 Treaty of Saint-Germain-en-Laye, the town and its surroundings were annexed by newly established Czechoslovakia and was renamed Valtice. The main reason was the requirement that the entire Znojmo–Břeclav railway line, a branch of the former Emperor Ferdinand Northern Railway, remain inside Czechoslovak territory. The Liechtenstein princely family lost its privileges with the collapse of Austria-Hungary. Valtice served as the Liechtenstein's residence continuously until 1939. The town was occupied by Nazi Germany upon the 1938 Munich Agreement and incorporated into the Reichsgau Niederdonau. After World War II the remaining German-speaking population was expelled and the castle was confiscated by the Czechoslovak government; all claims for restitution have been rejected.

== Demographics ==
Historical population

Year	Pop.	±%
1869	2,946	—
1880	3,435	+16.6%
1890	3,659	+6.5%
1900	3,742	+2.3%
1910	4,059	+8.5%

Year	Pop.	±%
1921	3,959	−2.5%
1930	4,125	+4.2%
1950	3,432	−16.8%
1961	3,314	−3.4%
1970	3,495	+5.5%

Year	Pop.	±%
1980	3,583	+2.5%
1991	3,554	−0.8%
2001	3,630	+2.1%
2011	3,652	+0.6%
2021	3,525	−3.5%

Source: Censuses

== Economy ==
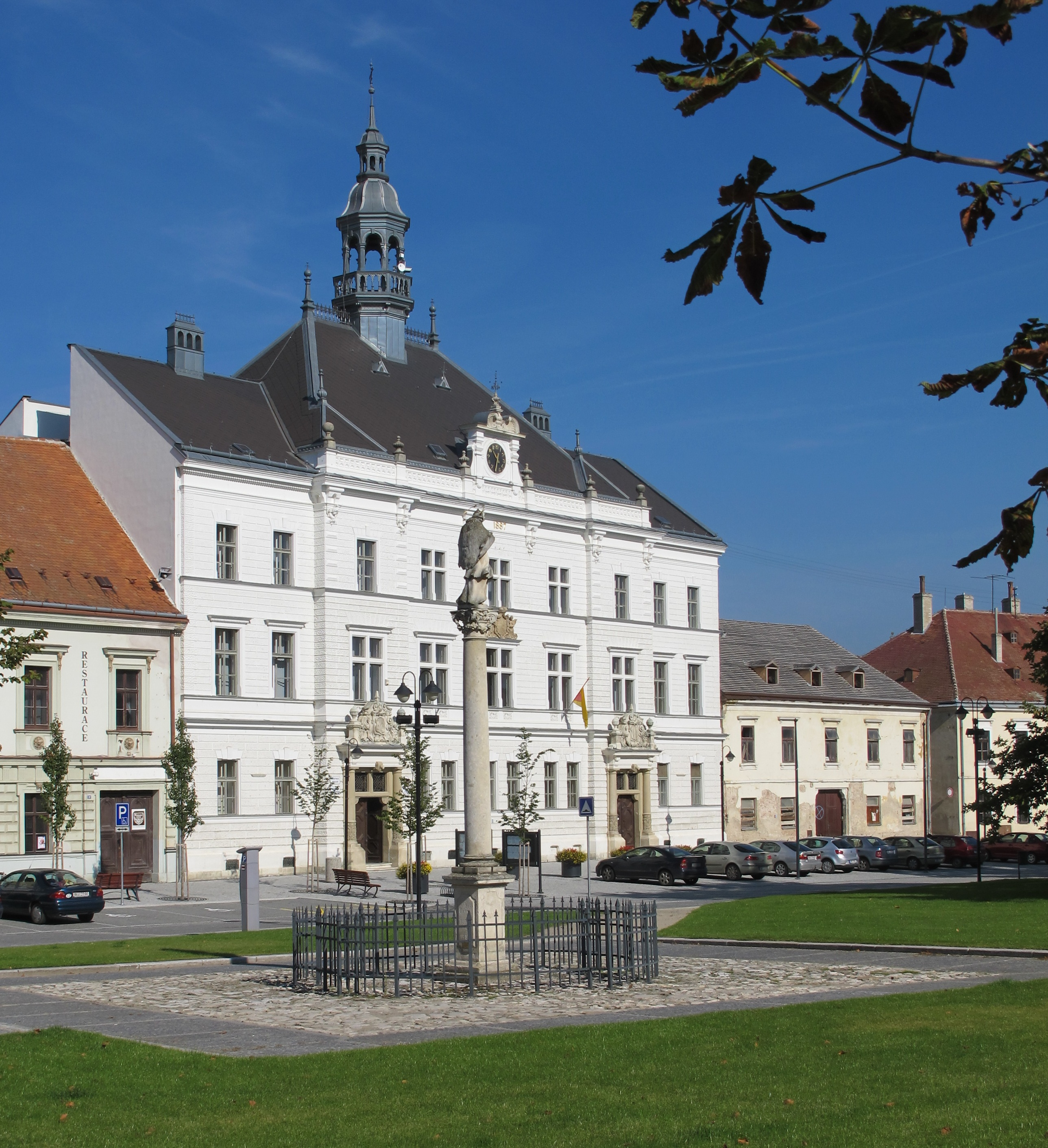
Town hall

Valtice lies in the centre of Mikulovská wine subregion. The town is known as a centre of wine making in Moravia. Both the National Wine Centre and the Wine Salon of the Czech Republic reside in the Valtice Castle.

== Transport ==
The I/40 road from Břeclav to Mikulov runs through the town.

Valtice is located on the Břeclav–Znojmo railway line. It is served by two stations and stops: Valtice and Valtice město.

== Culture ==
The annual Valtice Wine Market wine exhibition is held in the riding hall of the castle at the beginning of May.

== Sights ==
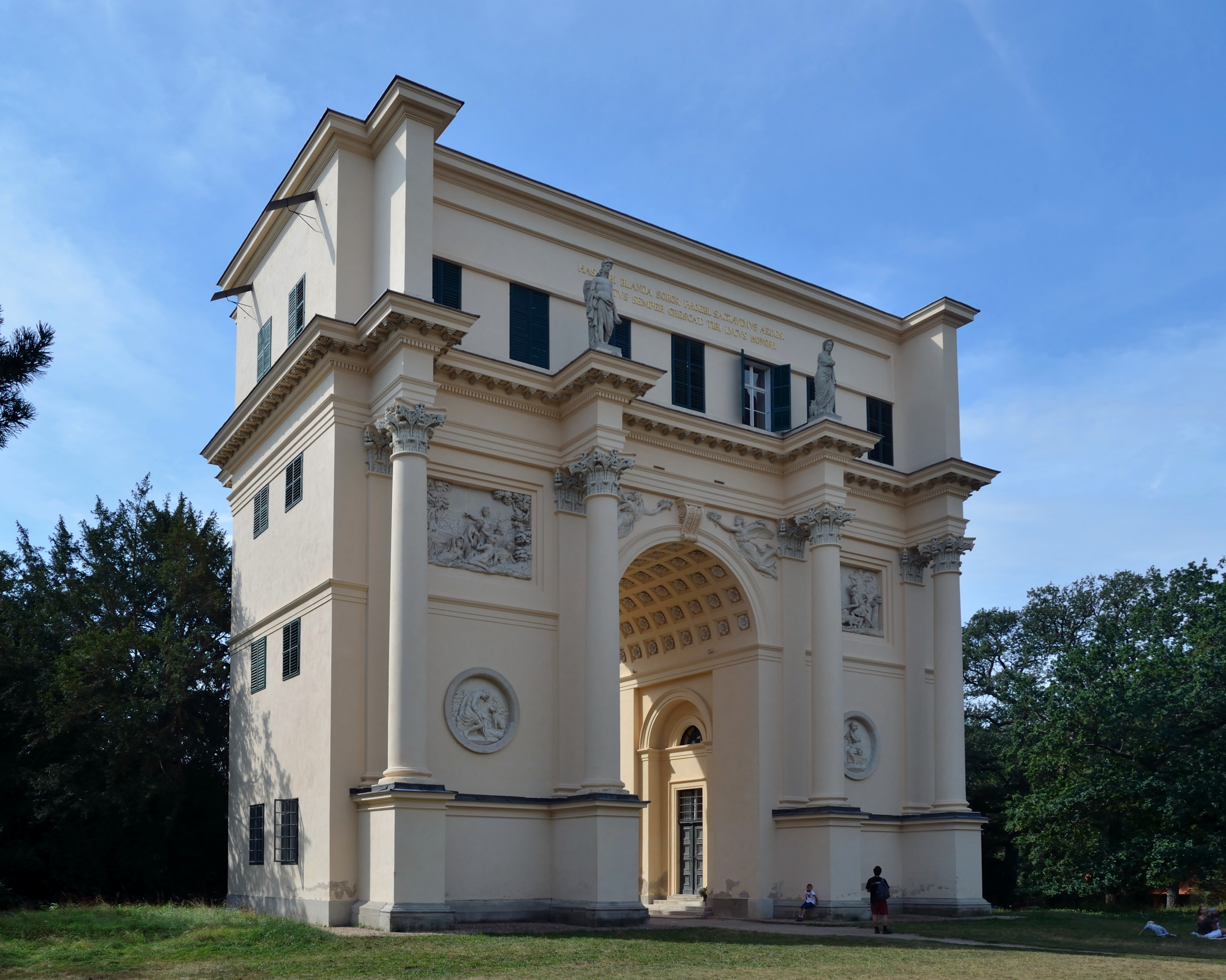
Temple of Diana

Valtice contains one of the most impressive Baroque residences of Central Europe, the Valtice Palace. It was designed as the seat of the ruling princes of Liechtenstein by Johann Bernhard Fischer von Erlach in the early 18th century. Together with the neighbouring manor of Lednice, to which it is connected by a 7 km (4 mi) long lime-tree avenue, Valtice forms the Lednice–Valtice Cultural Landscape, a UNESCO World Heritage Site.

The main features of the Lednice–Valtice Cultural Landscape located in Valtice are the castle surrounded by an English park with a colonnade in the Neoclassical style, and the Temple of Diana from 1812 designed by Joseph Hardtmuth.

== Notable people ==
- Johannes Matthias Sperger (1750–1812), Austrian contrabassist and composer
- Franz Bauer (1758–1840), Austrian microscopist and botanical artist
- Ferdinand Bauer (1760–1826), Austrian botanical illustrator
- Johann II, Prince of Liechtenstein (1840–1929), Austrian monarch; died here
- Leopold Adametz (1861–1941), Austrian zoologist
- Ivana Hloužková (1960–2023), actress
- Radim Nečas (born 1969), footballer
- František Čermák (born 1976), tennis player
- Barbora Seidlová (born 1981), actress
