= Hlohovec (Břeclav District) =

- Municipality
- Hraniční zámeček

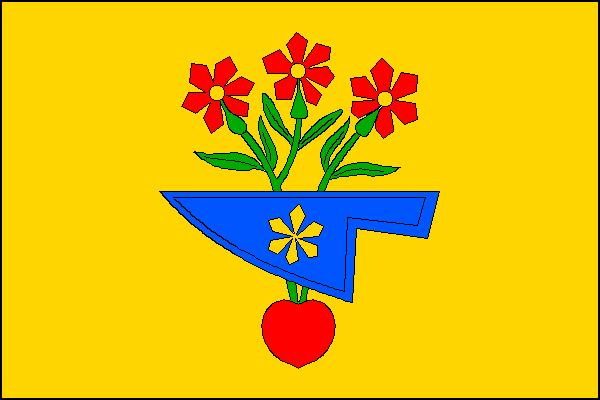
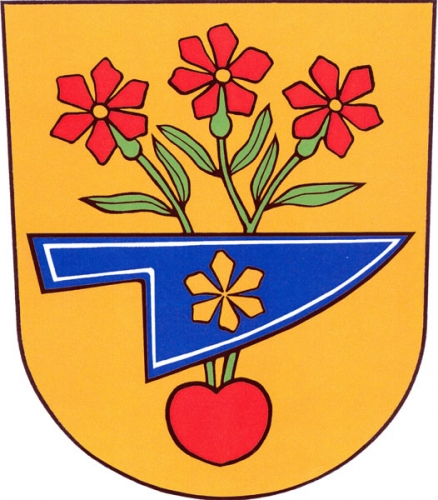
- Flag Coat of arms

- Location in the Czech Republic
- Coordinates: 48°46′26″N 16°45′44″E
- Country: Czech Republic
- Region: South Moravian
- District: Břeclav
- First mentioned: 1414

Area
  - Total: 8.96 km^{2} (3.46 sq mi)
- Elevation: 174 m (571 ft)

Population (2026-01-01)
  - Total: 1,318
  - Density: 147/km^{2} (381/sq mi)
- Time zone: UTC+1 (CET)
  - Summer (DST): UTC+2 (CEST)
- Postal code: 691 43
- Website: www.hlohovec.cz

Hlohovec (German: Bischofswarth) is a municipality and village in Břeclav District in the South Moravian Region of the Czech Republic. It has about 1,300 inhabitants. Hlohovec is located within the Lednice–Valtice Cultural Landscape, a UNESCO World Heritage Site.

== History ==
The first written mention of Hlohovec is from 1414, however it was probably founded already in the 13th century. The manor house called Hraniční zámeček was built in 1826.

== Demographics ==
Historical population
Year	Pop.	±%
1869	753	—
1880	871	+15.7%
1890	981	+12.6%
1900	1,005	+2.4%
1910	1,219	+21.3%
1921	1,313	+7.7%
1930	1,425	+8.5%
1950	1,307	−8.3%
1961	1,399	+7.0%
1970	1,287	−8.0%
1980	1,345	+4.5%
1991	1,347	+0.1%
2001	1,340	−0.5%
2011	1,288	−3.9%
2021	1,290	+0.2%
Source: Censuses
