= Lednice–Valtice Cultural Landscape =

UNESCO World Heritage Site
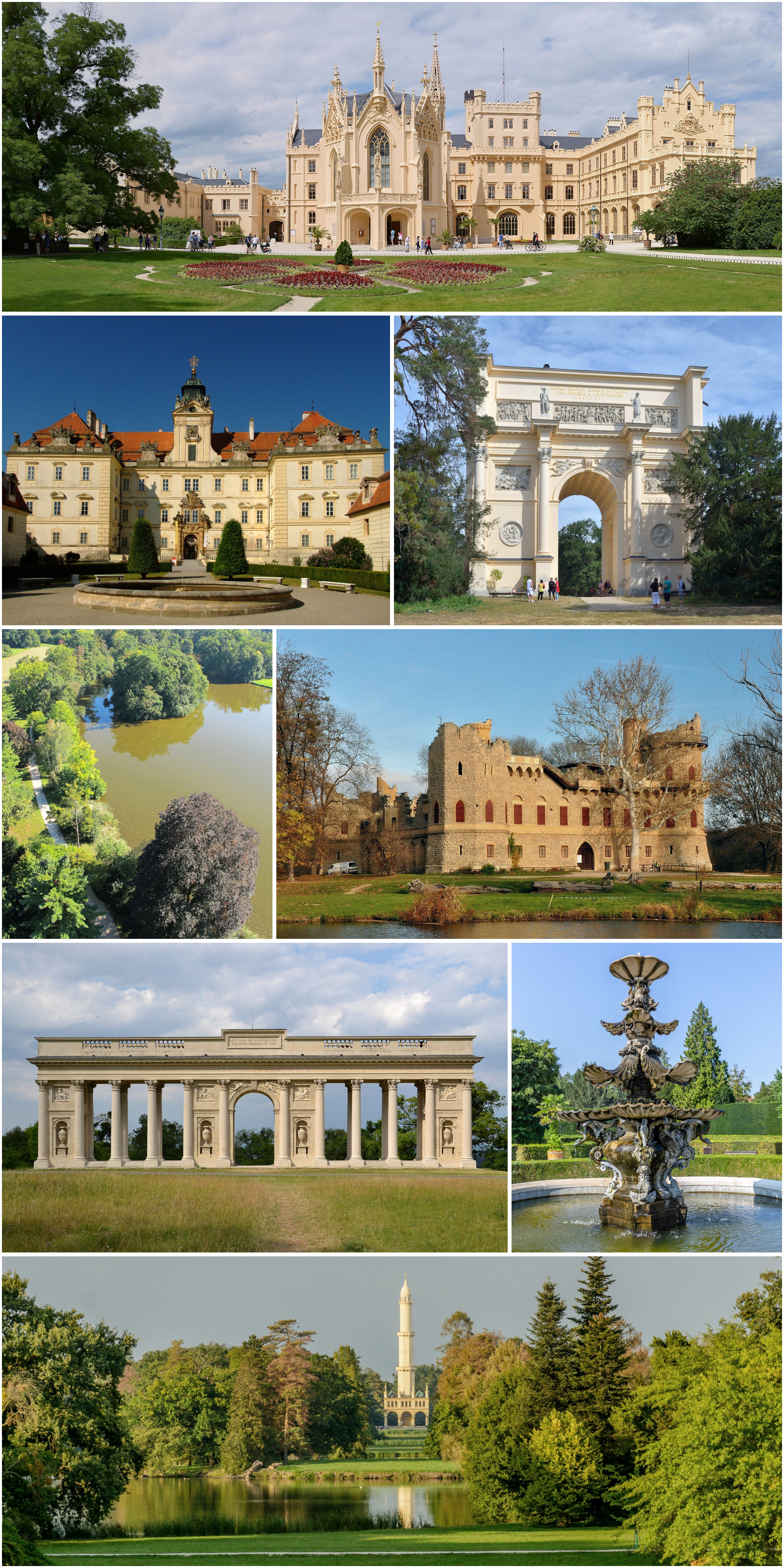
- from top: Lednice Castle, Valtice Castle, Rendezvous Pavilion, one of Lednice Ponds, Jan's Castle, Rajsna Colonnade, Venetian fountain in Lednice Castle garden, view on Lednice Castle park with Minaret

- Location within Czech Republic
- Location: Lednice and Valtice, Czech Republic
- Criteria: Cultural: (i), (ii), (iv)
- Reference: 763
- Inscription: 1996 (20th Session)
- Area: 14,320 ha (35,400 acres)
- Coordinates: 48°46′33″N 16°46′30″E

The Lednice–Valtice Cultural Landscape (also Lednice–Valtice Area or Lednice–Valtice Complex, Czech: Lednicko-valtický areál) is a cultural-natural landscape complex of 283.09 square kilometres (109.30 sq mi) in the South Moravian Region of the Czech Republic. It comprises the municipalities of Lednice, Valtice and Hlohovec, and the rural area of Břeclav.

In 1996, the Lednice-Valtice Area was registered on the UNESCO World Heritage List because of its unique mix of Baroque, Neoclassical, and neo-Gothic architecture, and its history as a cultural landscape designed intentionally by a single family. It is part of the Dolní Morava Biosphere Reserve, a biosphere reserve, parts of which were registered by UNESCO several years before. The close proximity of two cultural landscapes protected by UNESCO is unique.

== History ==
The House of Liechtenstein acquired Valtice (German name: Feldsberg) Castle in 1249, which marked the beginning of their settlement in the area. It remained the principal Liechtenstein residence for 700 years, until 1939 and World War II. Valtice Castle was expanded in late Romanesque style in the first half of the 13th century, but was badly damaged in the Hussite Wars and later rebuilt by Prince Charles I of Liechtenstein, in the Baroque style. From the 14th century, Lednice (German name: Eisgrub) was a fortified manor belonging to the Valtice estate and from 1680 it was expanded into a palace that was redesigned in a Tudor Gothic Revival style (then: "Old English style") between 1846 and 1858 by Prince Aloys II.

=== 17th–19th centuries ===
The Princes of Liechtenstein transformed their properties Feldsberg (Valtice) and Eisgrub (Lednice) into one large and designed private park between the 17th and 20th centuries. During the 19th century, the princes continued transforming the area as a large traditional English landscape park. Feldsberg was part of Austria until 1919, Eisgrub part of the Kingdom of Bohemia, both member states of Austria-Hungary under the Habsburg rule, with the Austrian-Bohemian border running through the park between the two castles. The 1919 Treaty of Saint-Germain-en-Laye stipulated that the town of Feldsberg, which in 1910 was about 97% inhabited by German-speaking Lower Austrians, became part of Czechoslovakia.

The Baroque and neo-Gothic architecture of the castles are married with smaller buildings and a landscape that was fashioned according to the English principles of landscape architecture.

In 1715 these two castles were connected by a 7 km (4.3 mi) long landscape avenue and road, later renamed for the poet Petr Bezruč, due to his poem Valčice describing a journey to Lednice after tasting vine in Valtice. Whilst both Lednice and Valtice have grown since then, and the road does not connect the castles as once intended, a large part of this avenue remains in use to this day. The Lednice fishponds are situated between the town of Valtice and municipalities of Lednice and Hlohovec; as are the ponds Mlýnský rybník, Prostřední rybník, Hlohovecký rybník, and Nesyt. A substantial part of the cultural landscape complex is covered in pine forests, known as Boří les, and in areas adjacent to the Thaya River with riparian forests.

=== 20th century ===
In 1918 the region became part of new Czechoslovakia. The Liechtenstein family opposed the annexation of Czech territory into Sudetenland by Nazi Germany, and as a consequence their properties were confiscated by the Nazis, and the family then relocated to Vaduz in 1939. After World War II, the Beneš decrees resulted in the confiscation of all Liechtenstein property in Czechoslovakia, as the family is seen as German in nationality to this day by the Czech state. The family made several legal attempts for restitution of the properties, but the communist regime was not interested in restitution of property to exiled aristocracy.

After the Czechoslovak Velvet Revolution in 1989, the Liechtenstein descendants again renewed attempts for restitution, which were repeatedly denied by the Czech state, the present day owner of the properties.

== Features ==
The principal elements are:

- Valtice Castle (German: Schloss Feldsberg) and its contiguous town of Valtice
- Lednice Castle (German: Schloss Eisgrub) and its contiguous village of Lednice
- The village of Hlohovec

=== Pavilions and follies ===
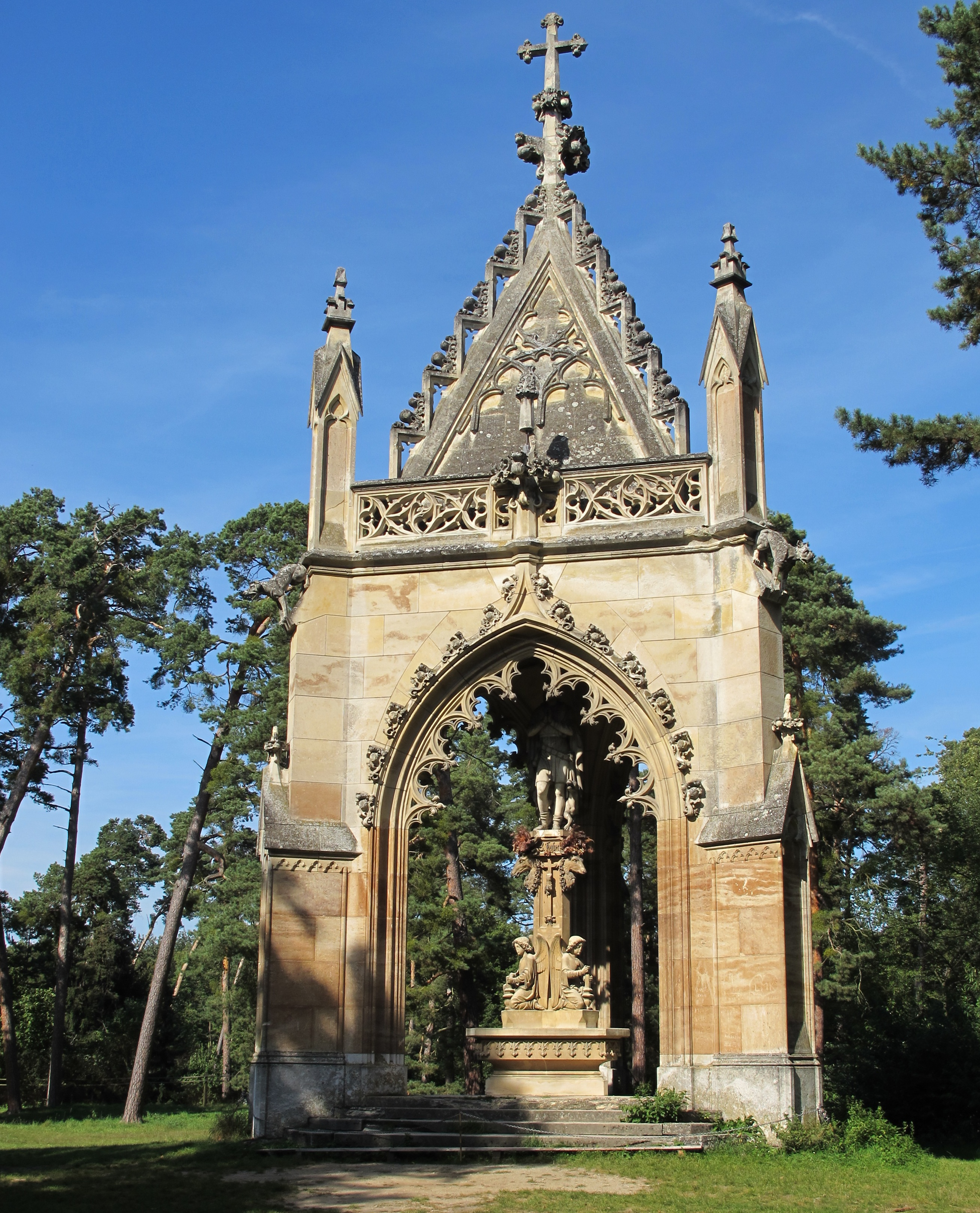
Chapel of Saint Hubert

In addition to the castles, there are many large to small residential pavilions located throughout the designed landscape, often serving as summer houses or hunting lodges.

- The Colonnade (Rajsna) – a Neoclassical colonnade on the top of a hill ridge above Valtice (like a gloriette) from the 1810s to 1820s
- Belvedere – a belvedere landscape element
- Rendezvous (or Temple of Diana) – a hunting lodge in a form of a Neoclassical arch from the 1810s
- Chapel of Saint Hubert (Kaple svatého Huberta) – a Gothic Revival column structure from the 1850s dedicated to the patron saint of hunters, situated in the Pine wood
- Border House (Hraniční zámeček) – a Neoclassical summer house built in the 1820s directly on the former (until 1920) borderline between Lower Austria and Moravia

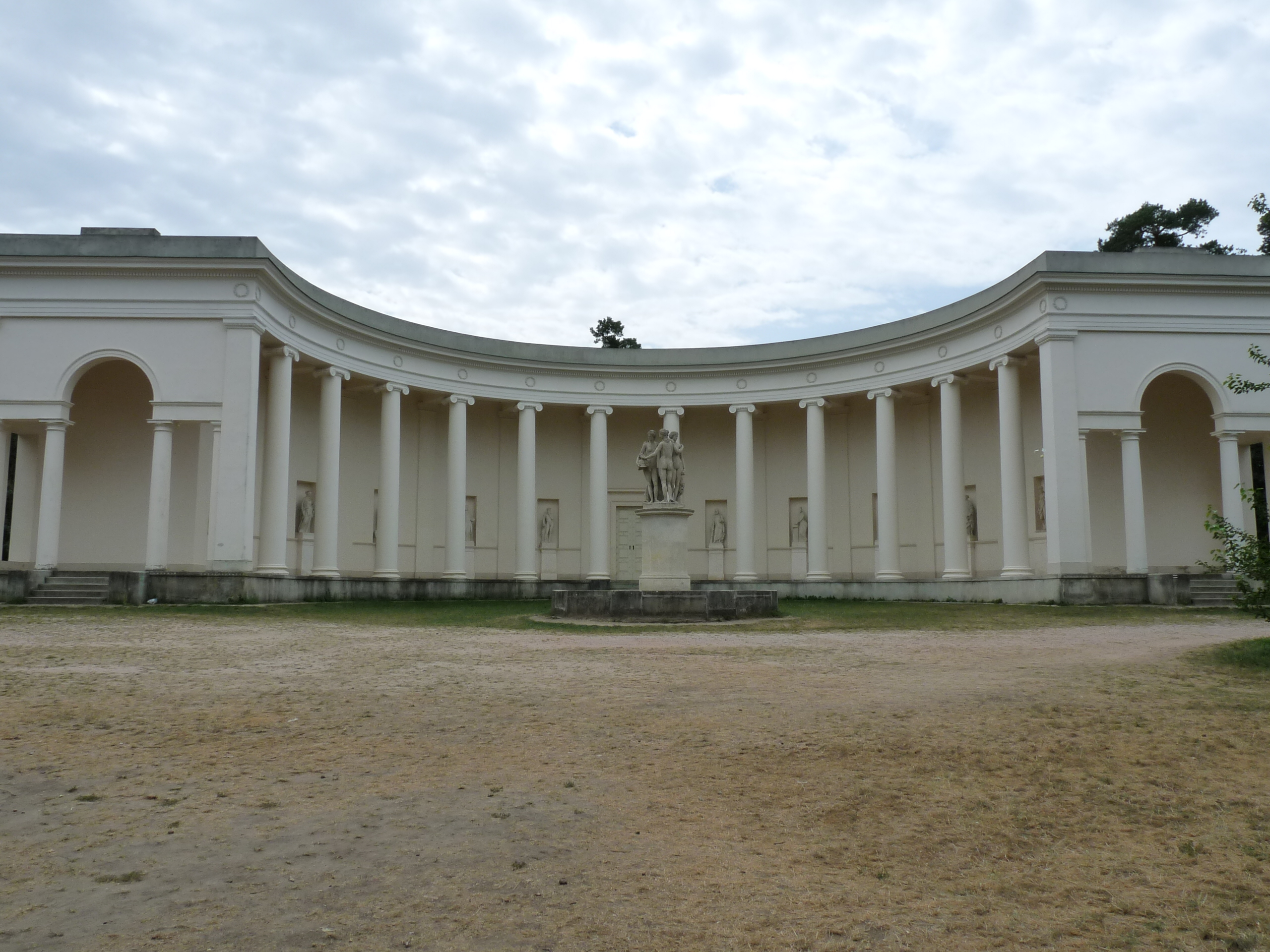
Temple of the Three Graces

- Temple of the Three Graces (Tři Grácie) – a semicircle gallery with allegorical statues of Sciences and Muses and a statue of the Three Graces from the 1820s
- Pond House (Rybniční zámeček) – at the shore of one of the Lednice Ponds

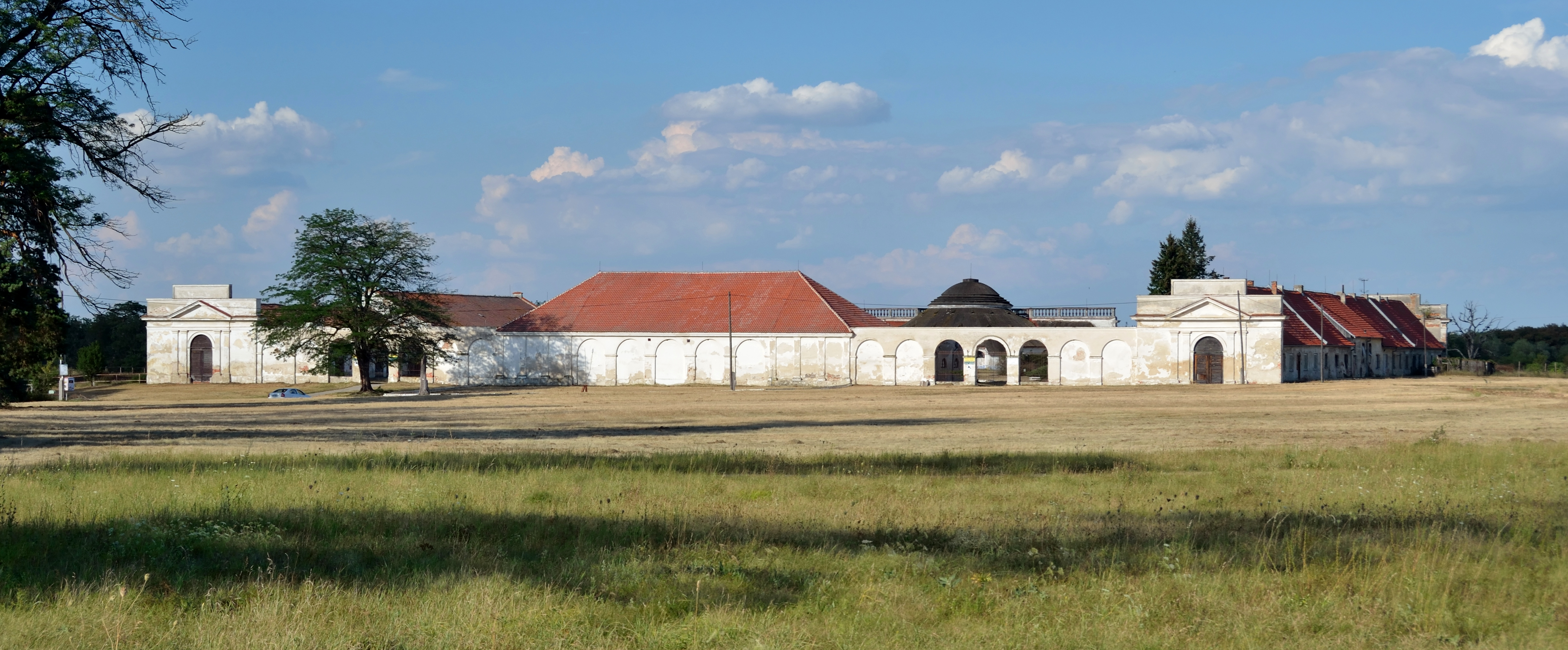
Nový dvůr

- Nový dvůr (lit. 'new farmyard') – a Neoclassical farm finished in 1809, originally used for sheep husbandry, nowadays for horse breeding
- Apollo Temple (Apollónův chrám) – a Neoclassical hunting lodge from the 1810s, ashore of one of the Lednice Ponds
- Hunting Lodge (Lovecký zámeček) – a Neoclassical house from 1806
- Jan's Castle (Janův hrad or Janohrad) – a Gothic Revival folly of artificial ruins in style of a medieval castle, finished in 1810
- Minaret – a Moorish Revival "minaret" observation tower 62 metres (203 ft) high, located in the Lednice Castle garden (finished in 1804), which provides a view of the entire landscape
- Obelisk – an obelisk erected in memory of the peace treaty of Campo Formio (1798), the last remaining of the many obelisks originally built by the Liechtensteins in the area.

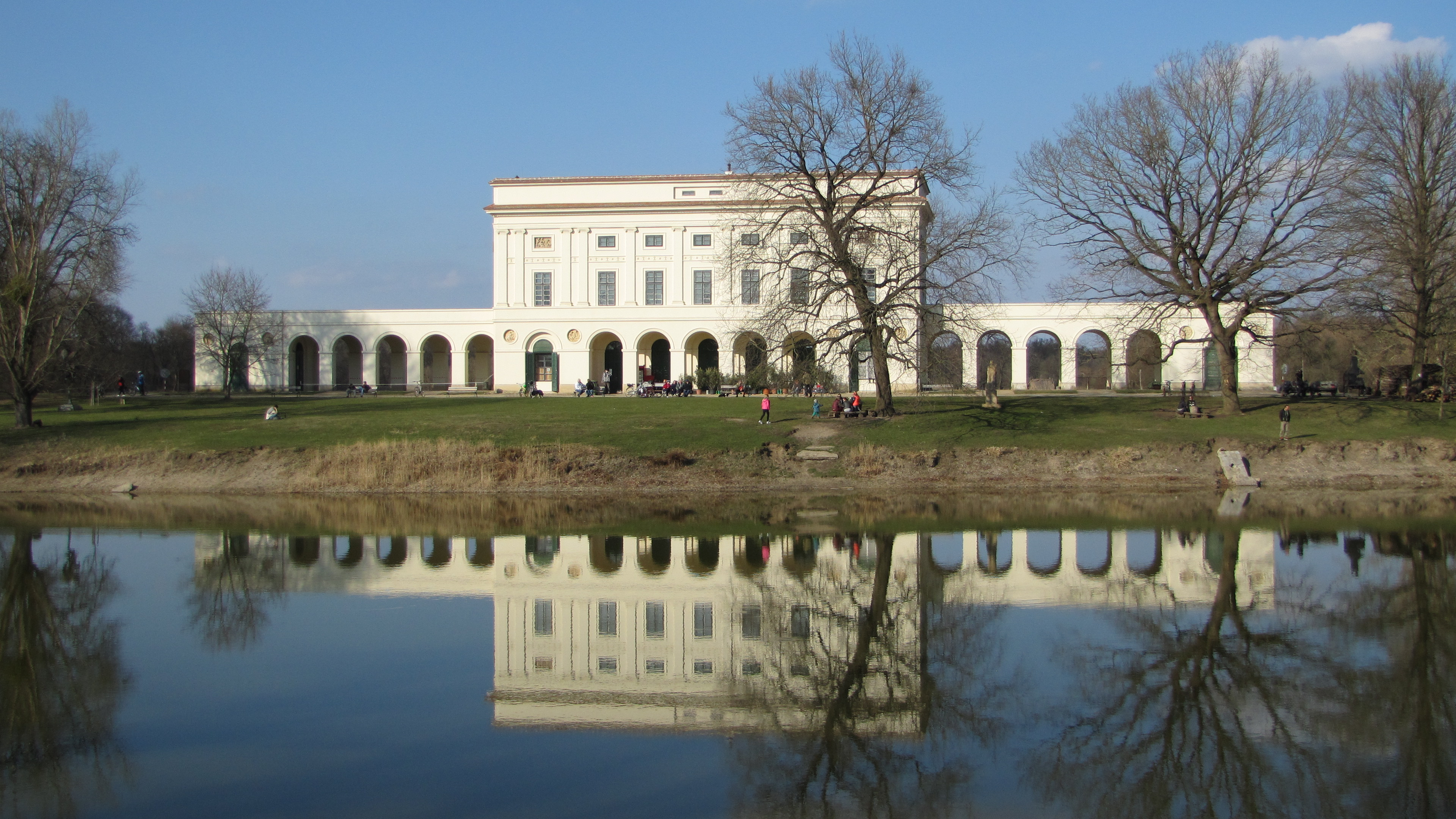
Pohansko

- Pohansko – an Empire hunting lodge finished after 1812, it houses an exhibition of Břeclav Town Museum. Close to the lodge there are both an important archaeological site of Great Moravian remains and reconstructed parts of the Czechoslovak border fortifications.
- Lány – an Empire hunting lodge from the beginning of the 19th century

== Preservation ==
The garden follies and the conservatory of Lednice Park were listed in the 1998 World Monuments Watch by the World Monuments Fund, because of their deteriorating condition resulting from insufficient financial resources. The Fund had previously studied the preservation of Lednice and Valtice Castles, and after 1998 it helped fund restoration of the Valtice Rendezvous folly as a demonstration project with support from American Express. After the year-to-year tourist season ended in the Czech Republic, the castle was ranked as the most visited place in the country, as new attractions were added to the site.

== See also ==
- Cultural landscapes—related topics
- List of World Heritage Sites in the Czech Republic

== Gallery ==
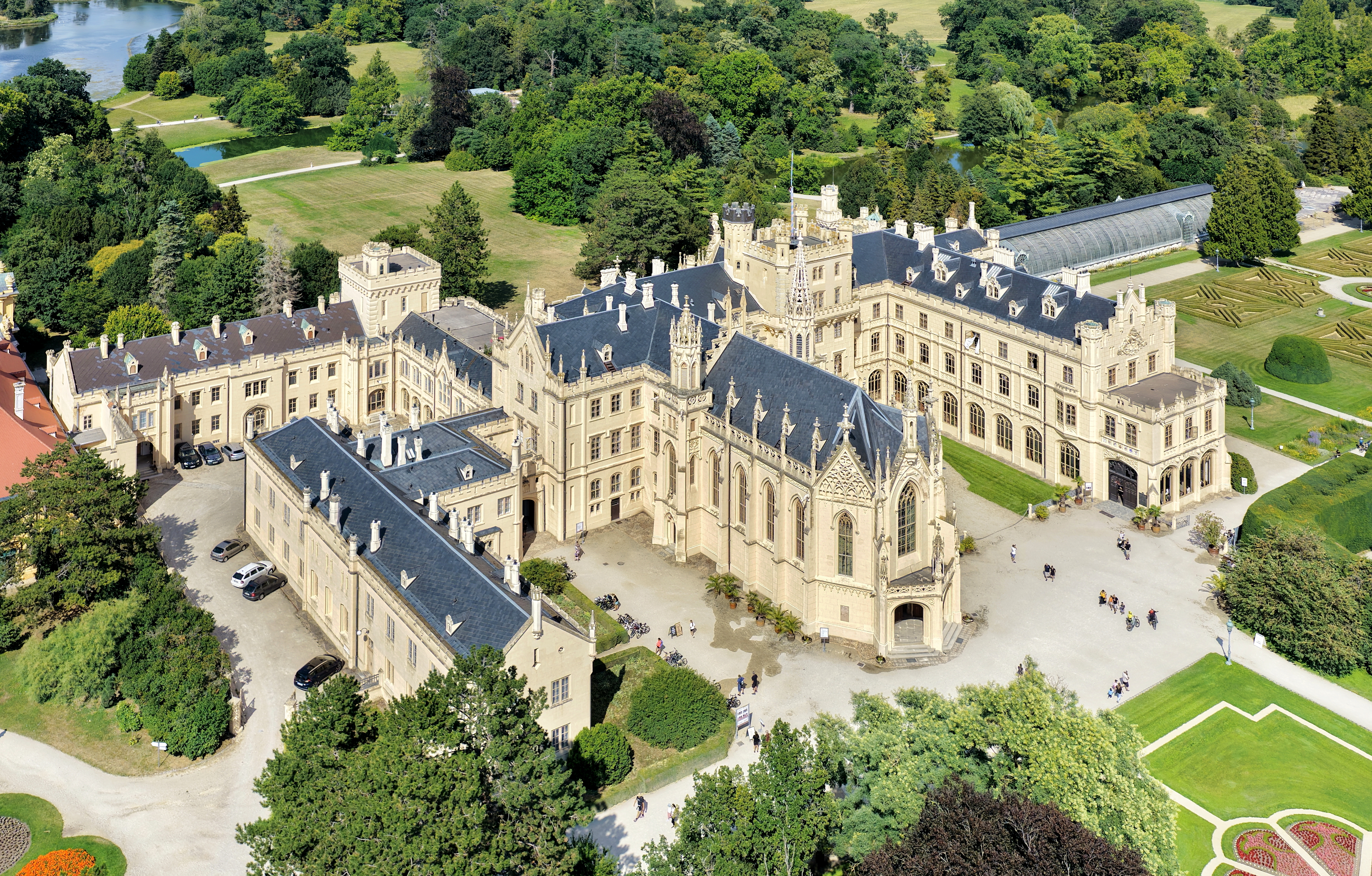
Lednice Castle

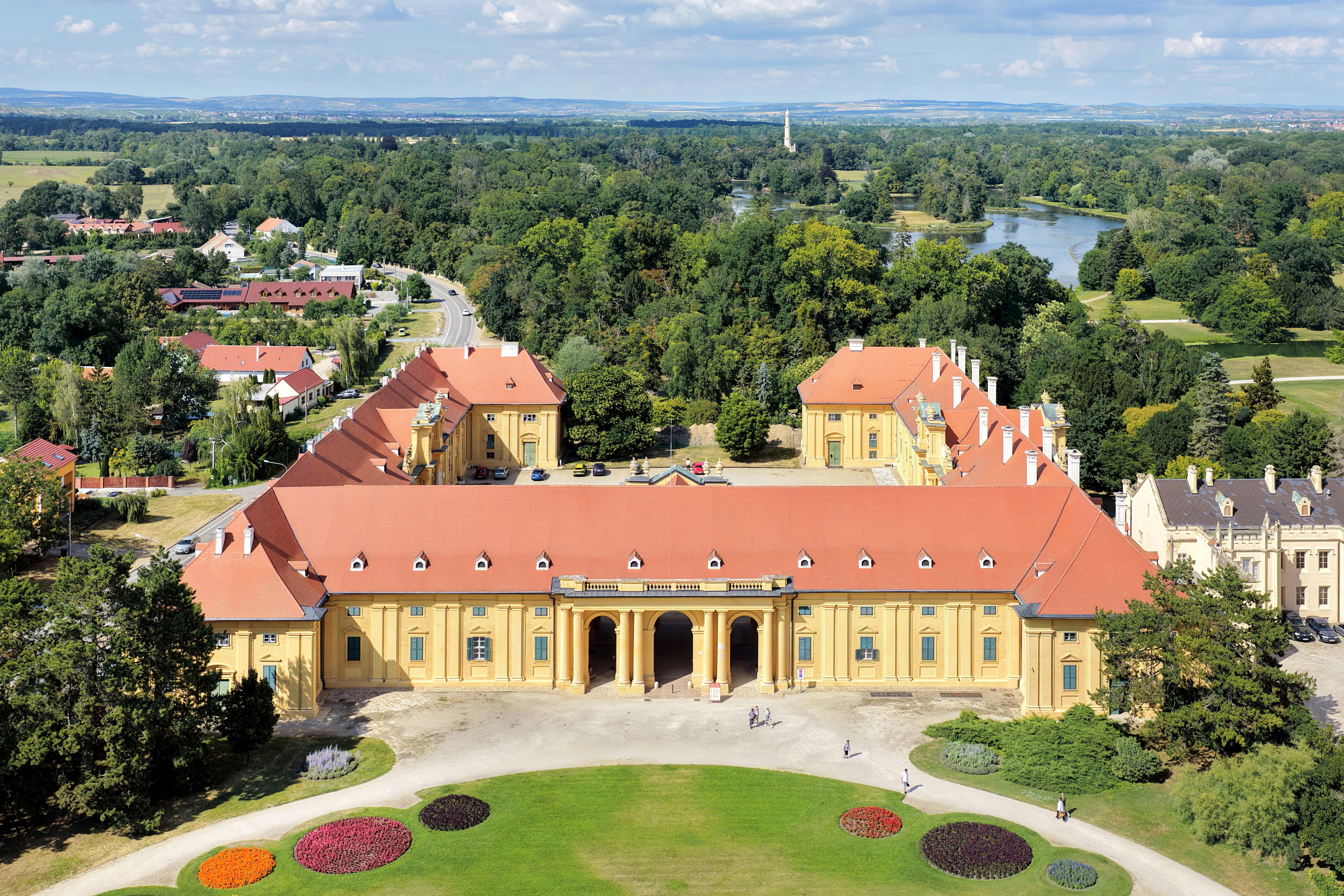
Lednice Castle
Riding-Hall

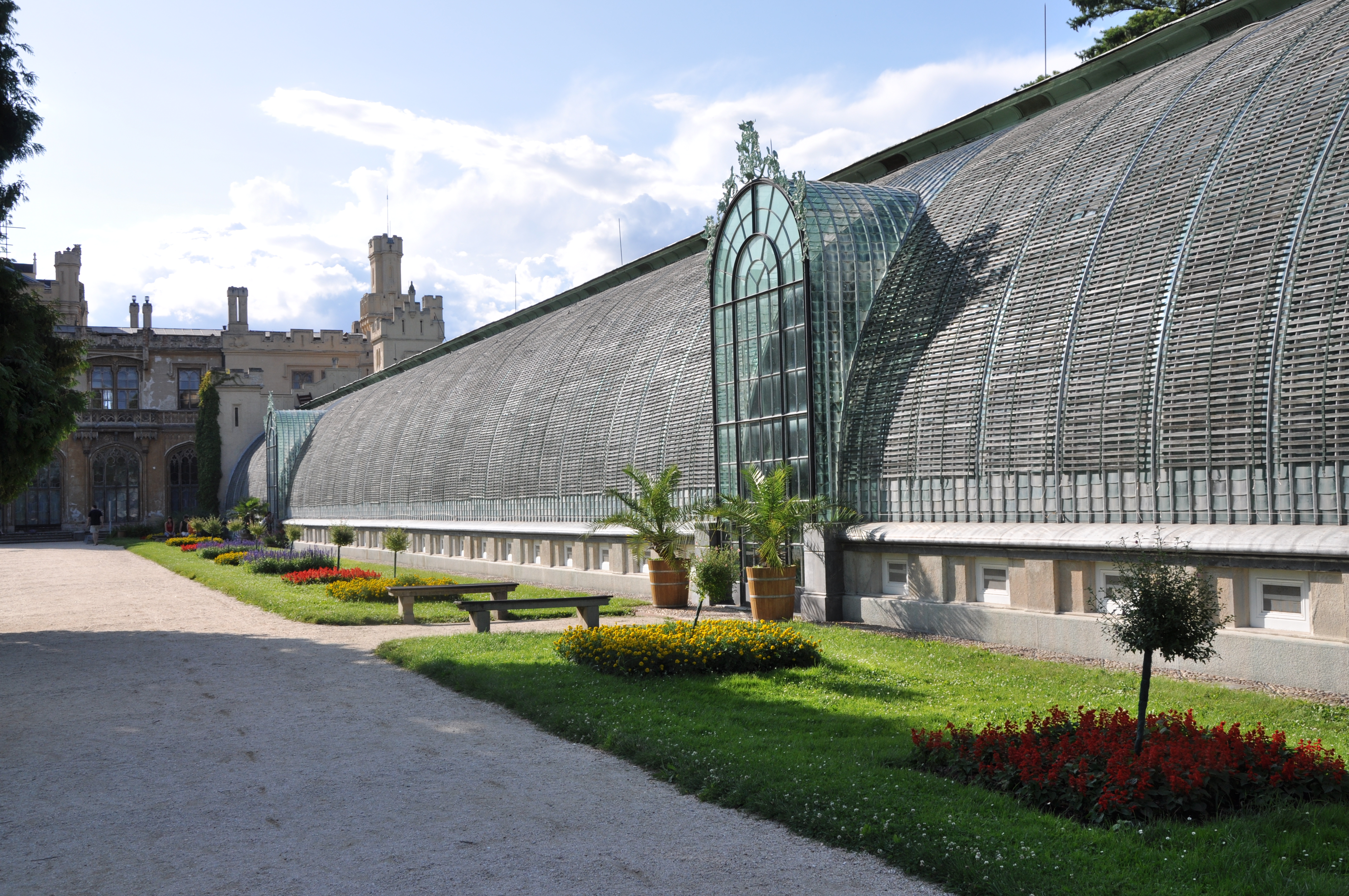
Castle Greenhouse in Lednice

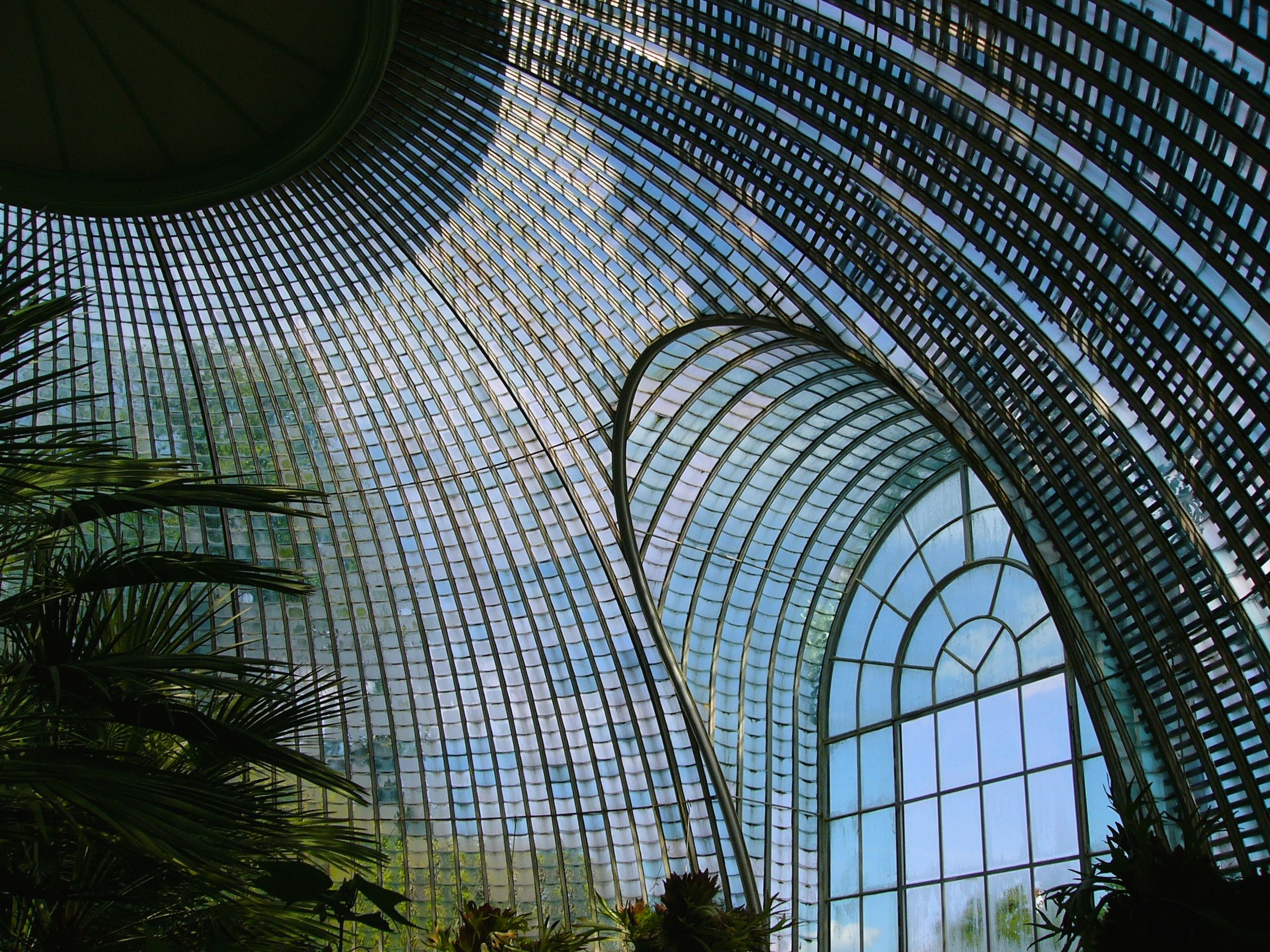
Interior of the greenhouse

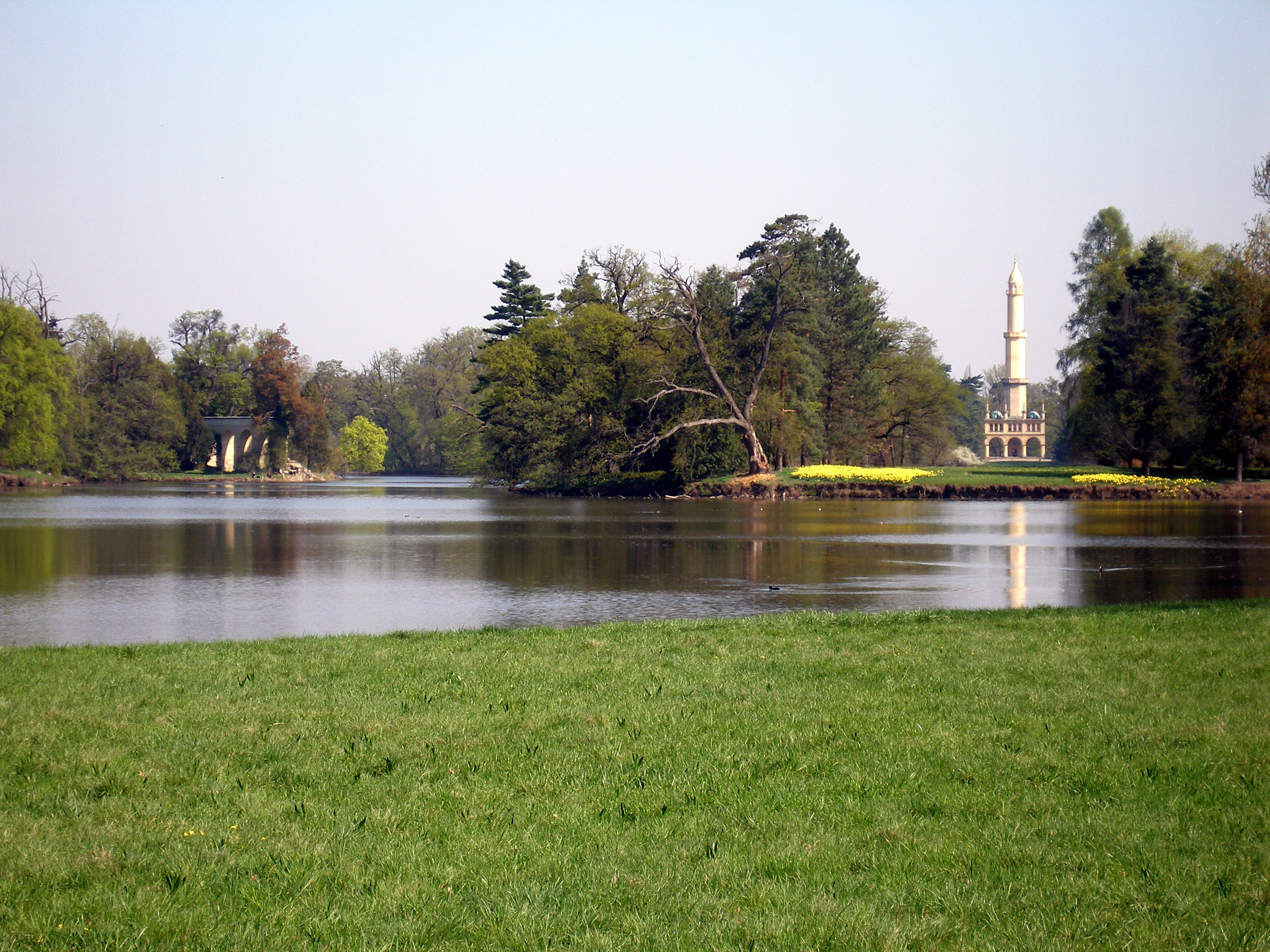
From the Lednice Castle garden

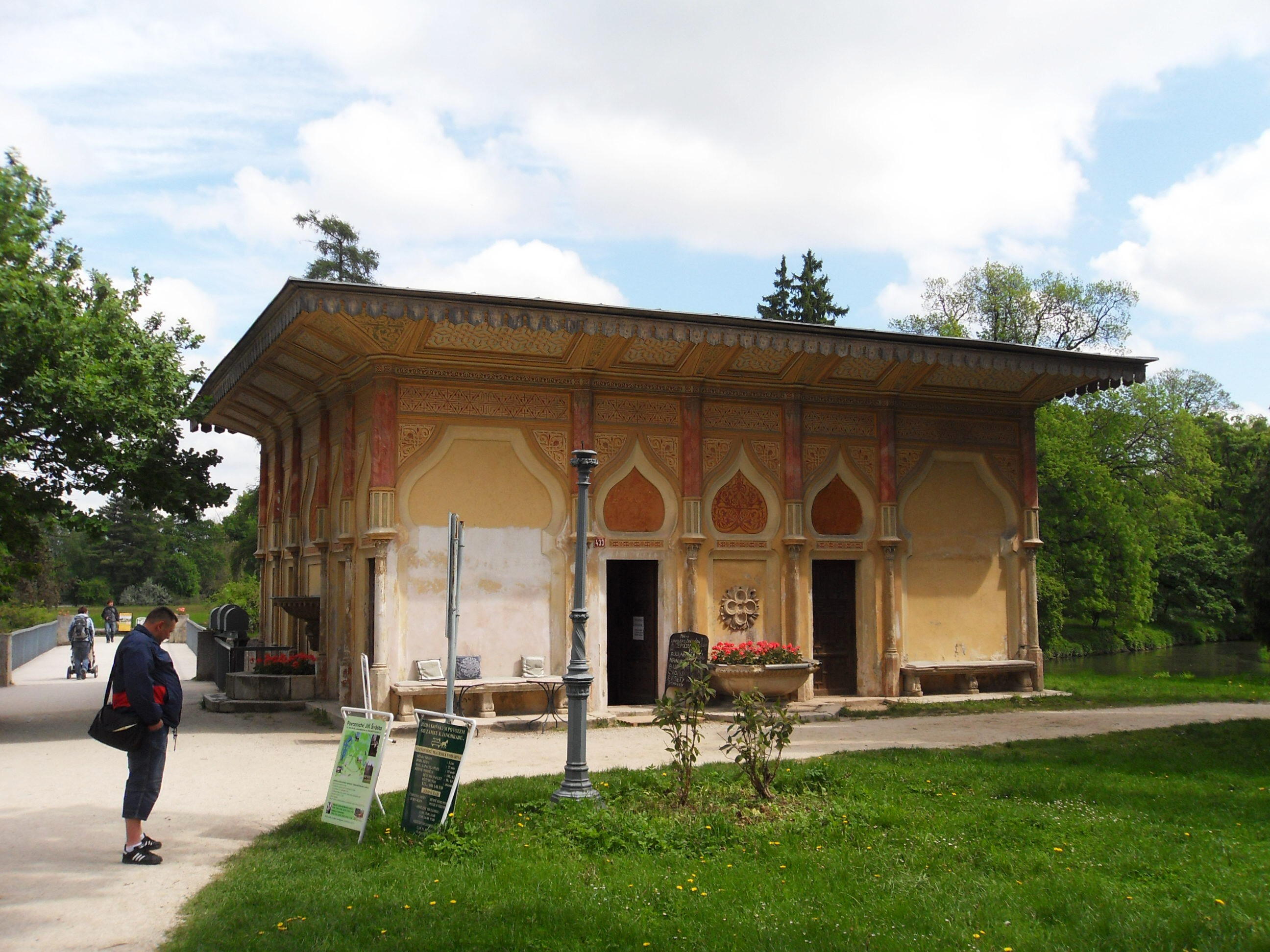
Moorish Waterworks

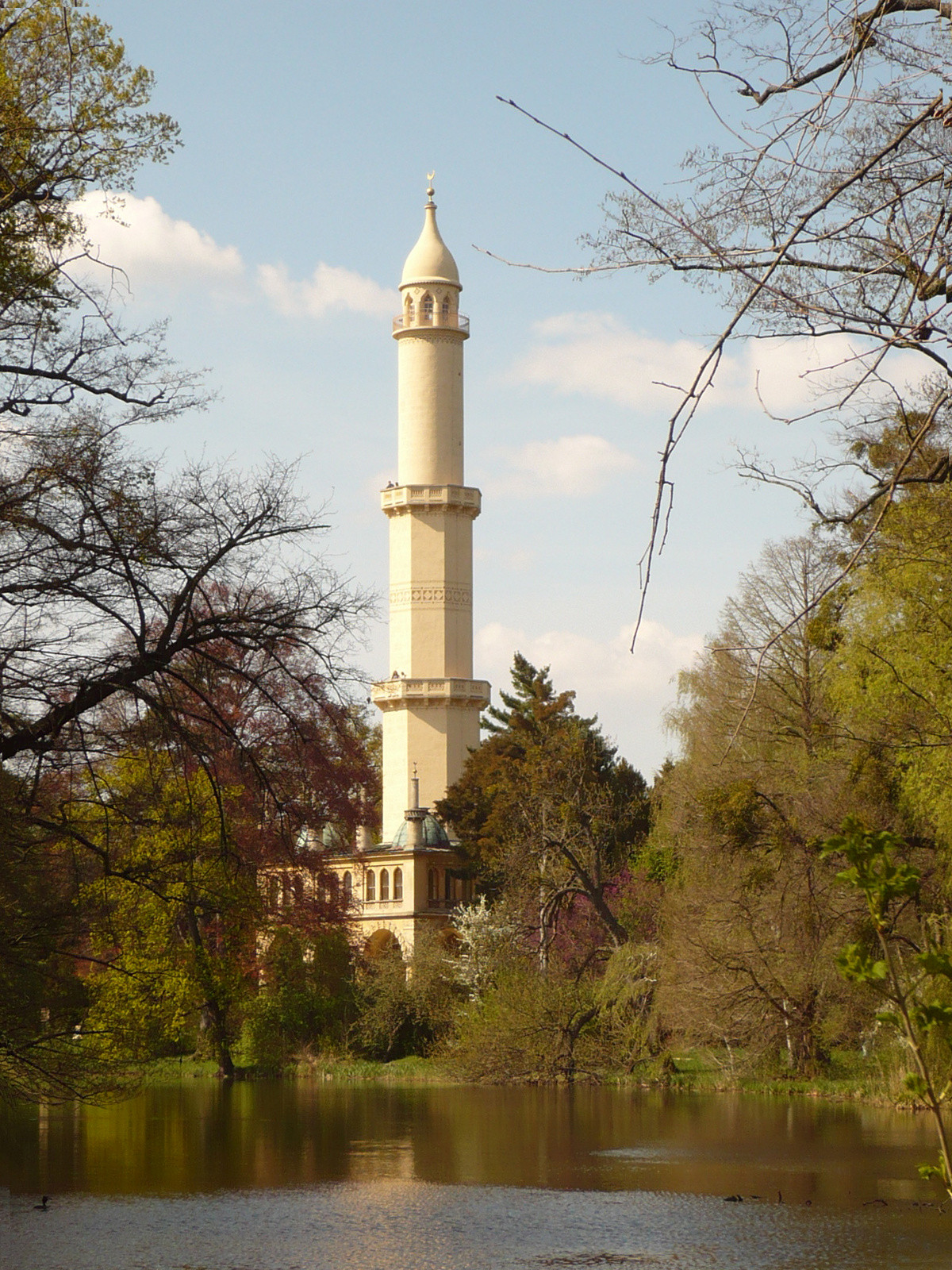
Minaret

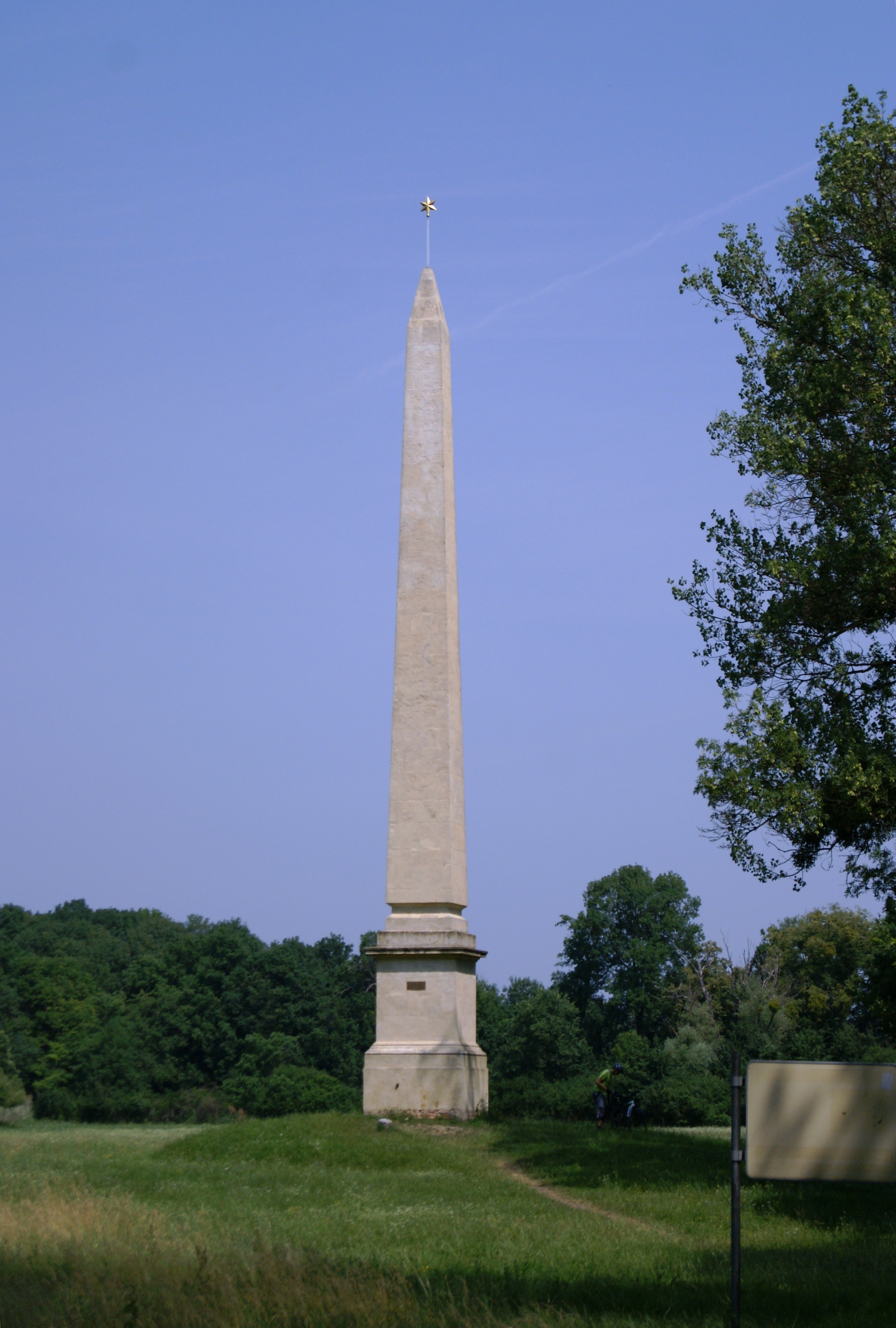
Obelisk

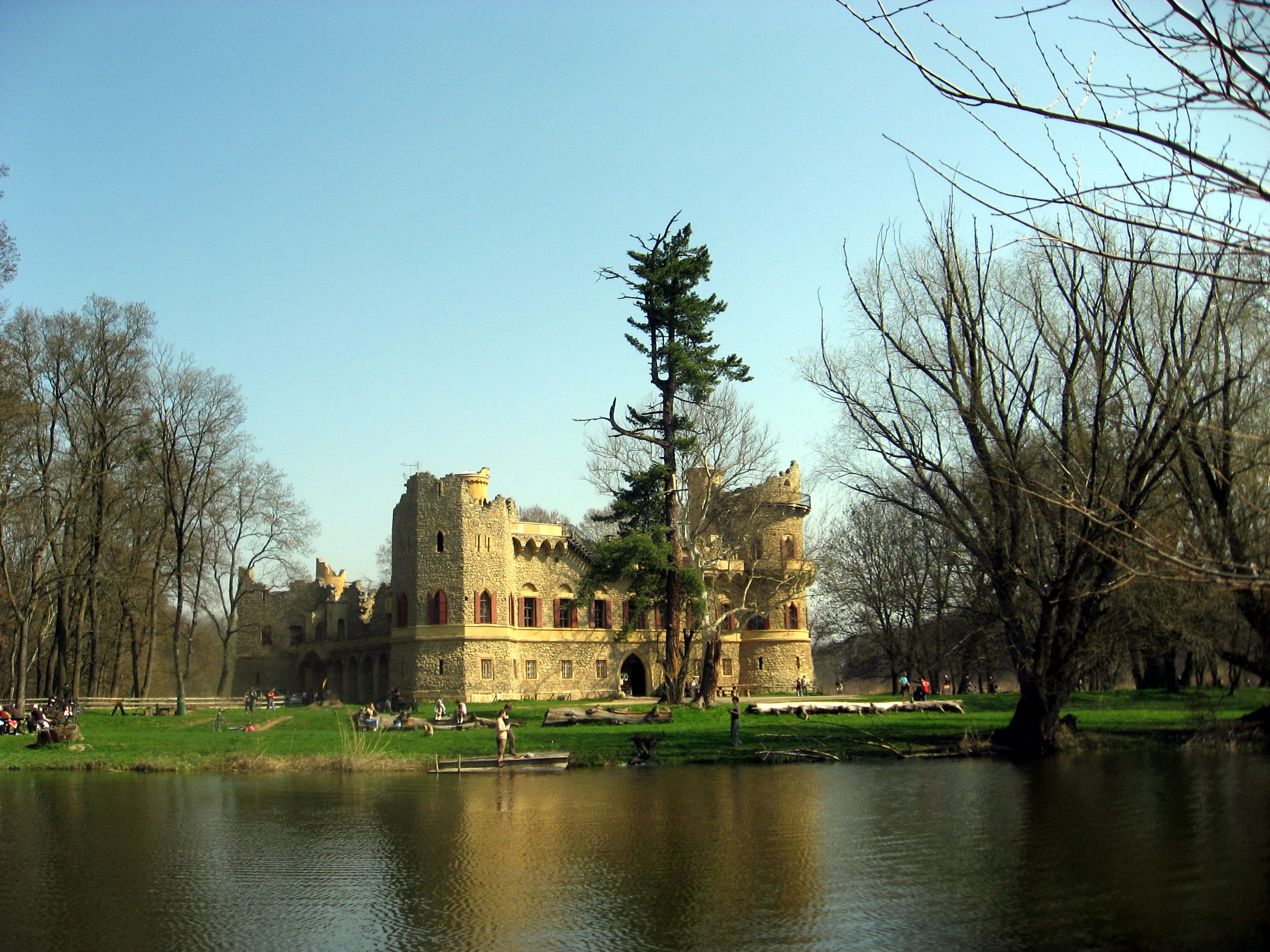
Jan's Castle

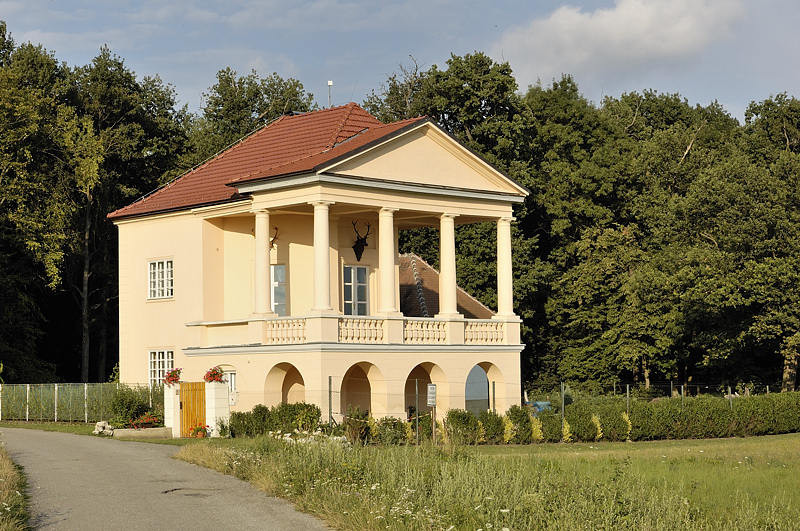
Hunting Lodge

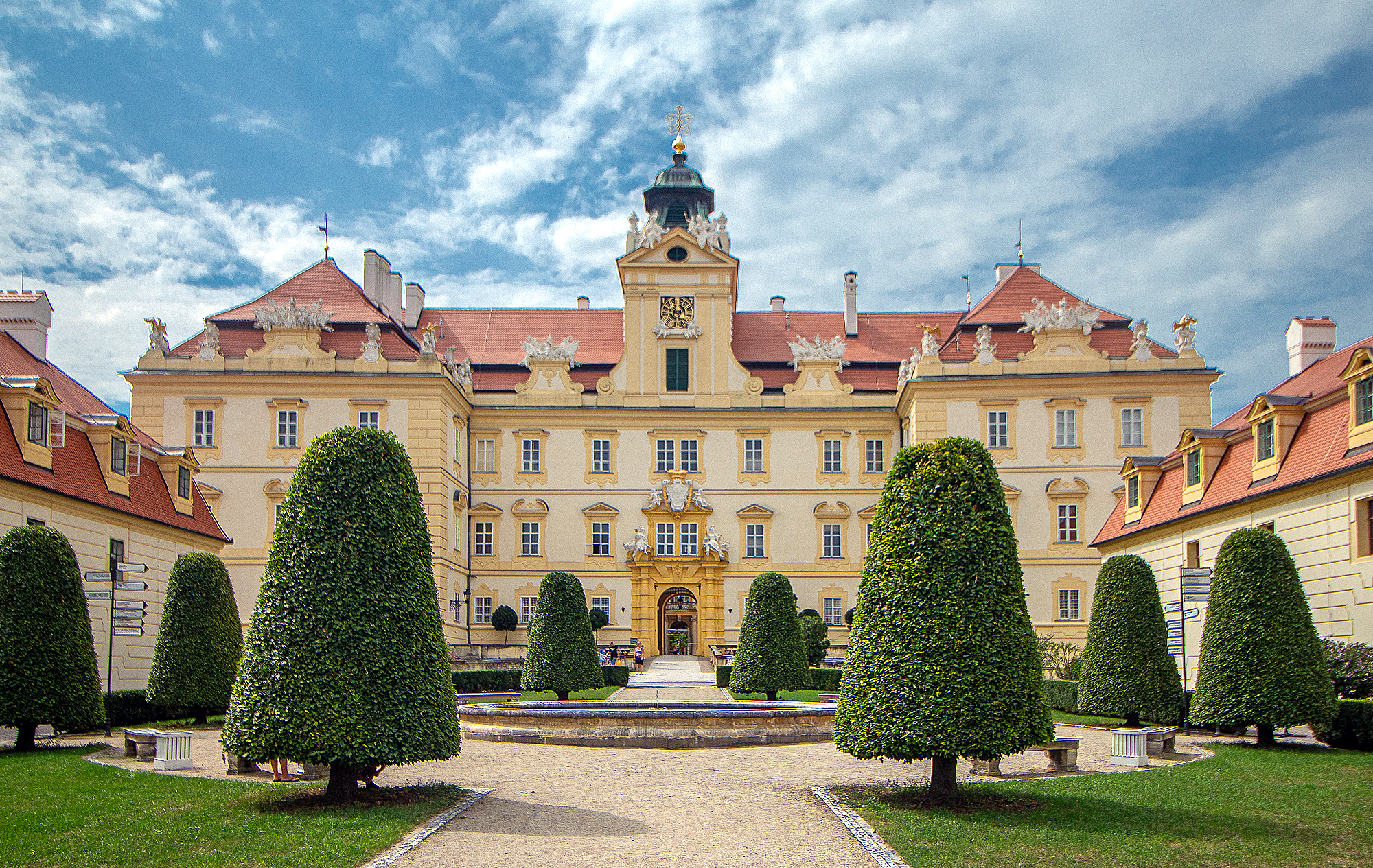
Valtice Castle

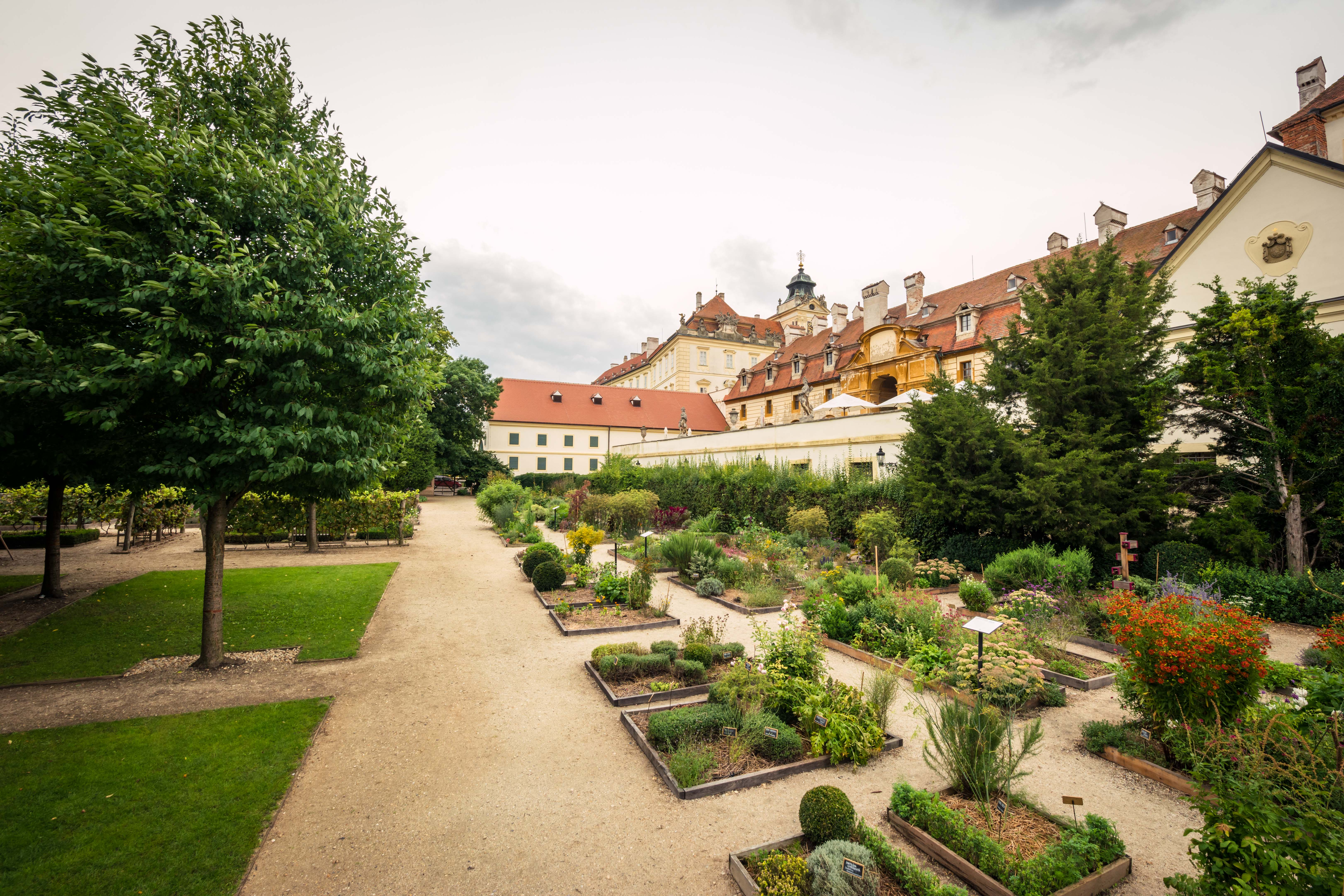
Herb Garden at Valtice Castle

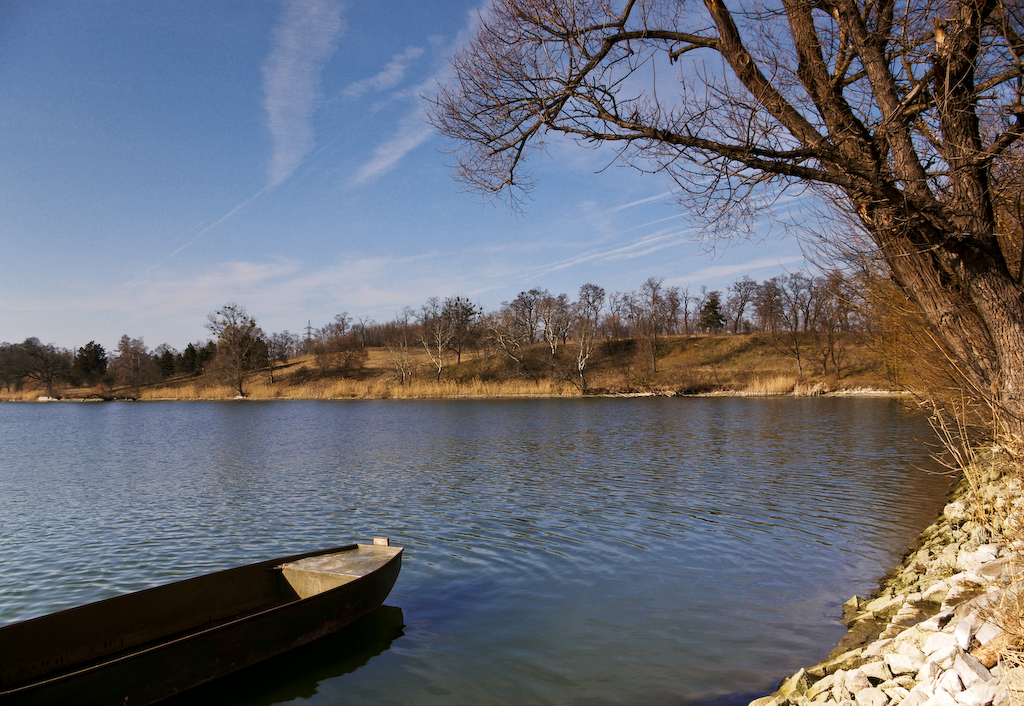
The Prostřední (Middle) one of the Lednice Ponds

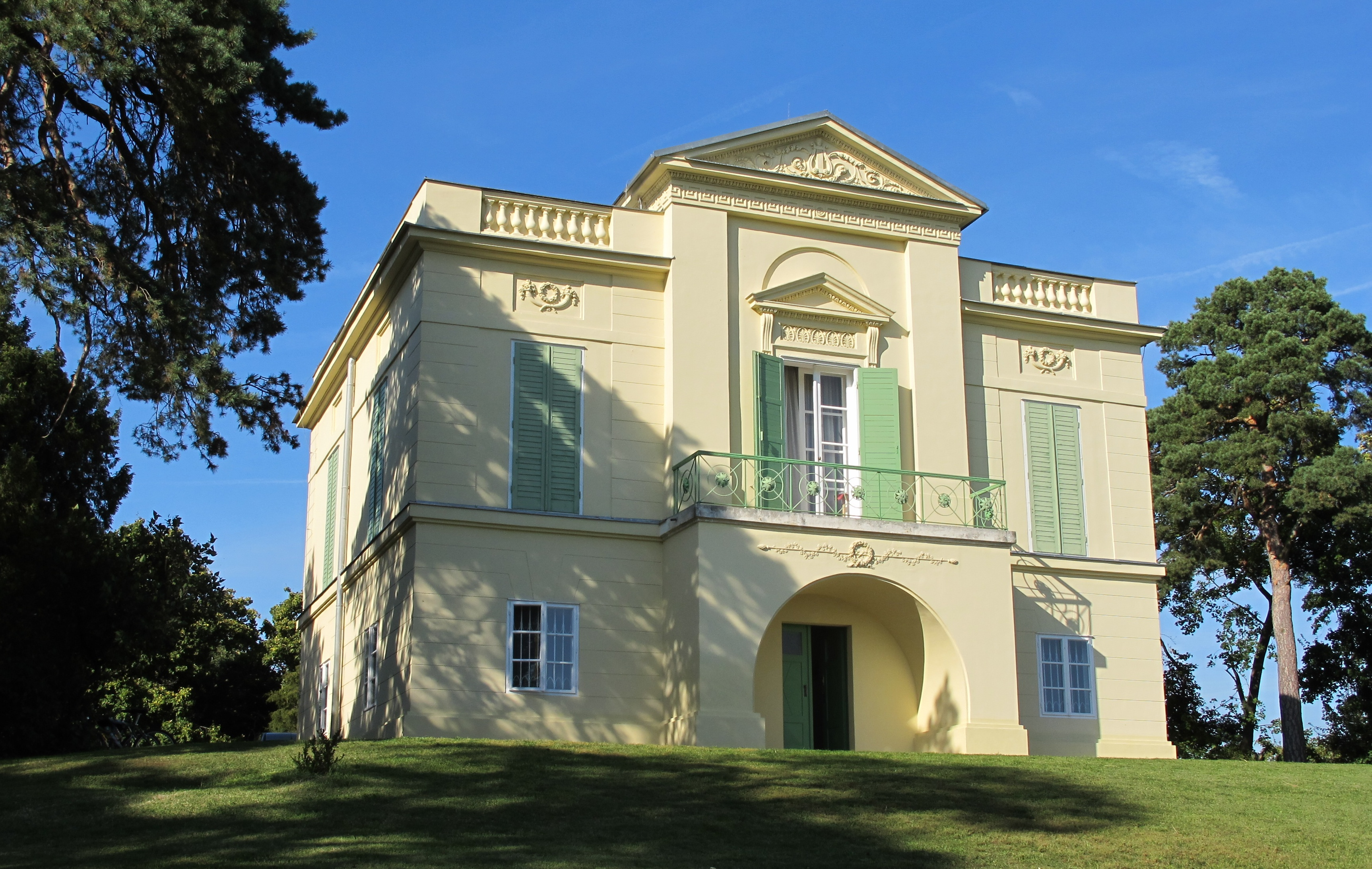
Pond House

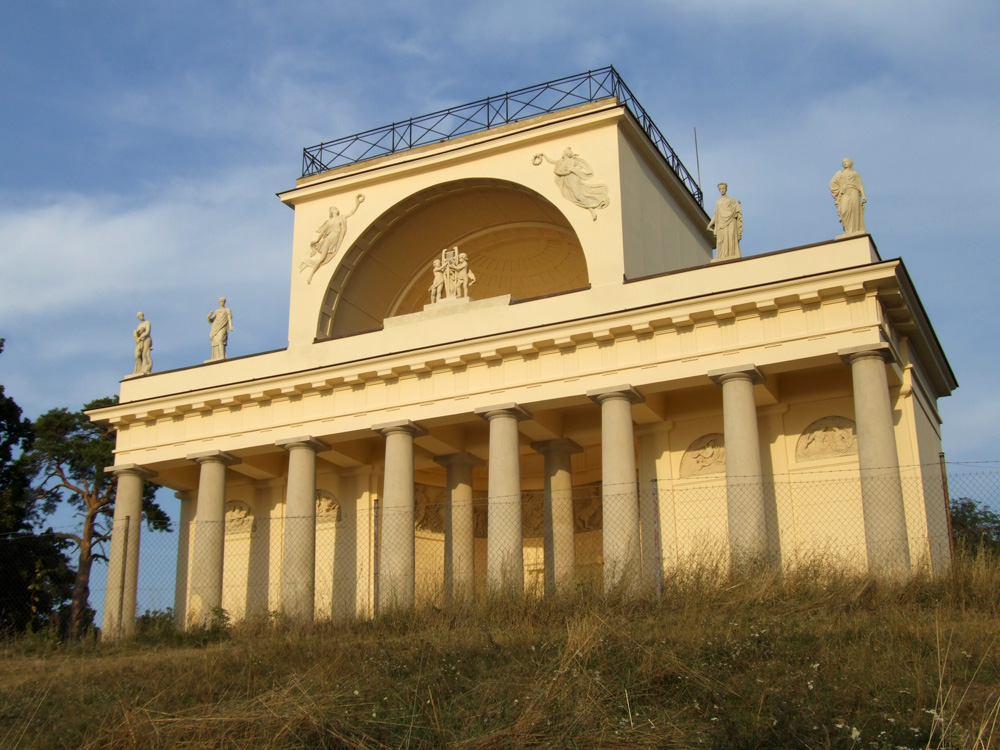
Apollo Temple

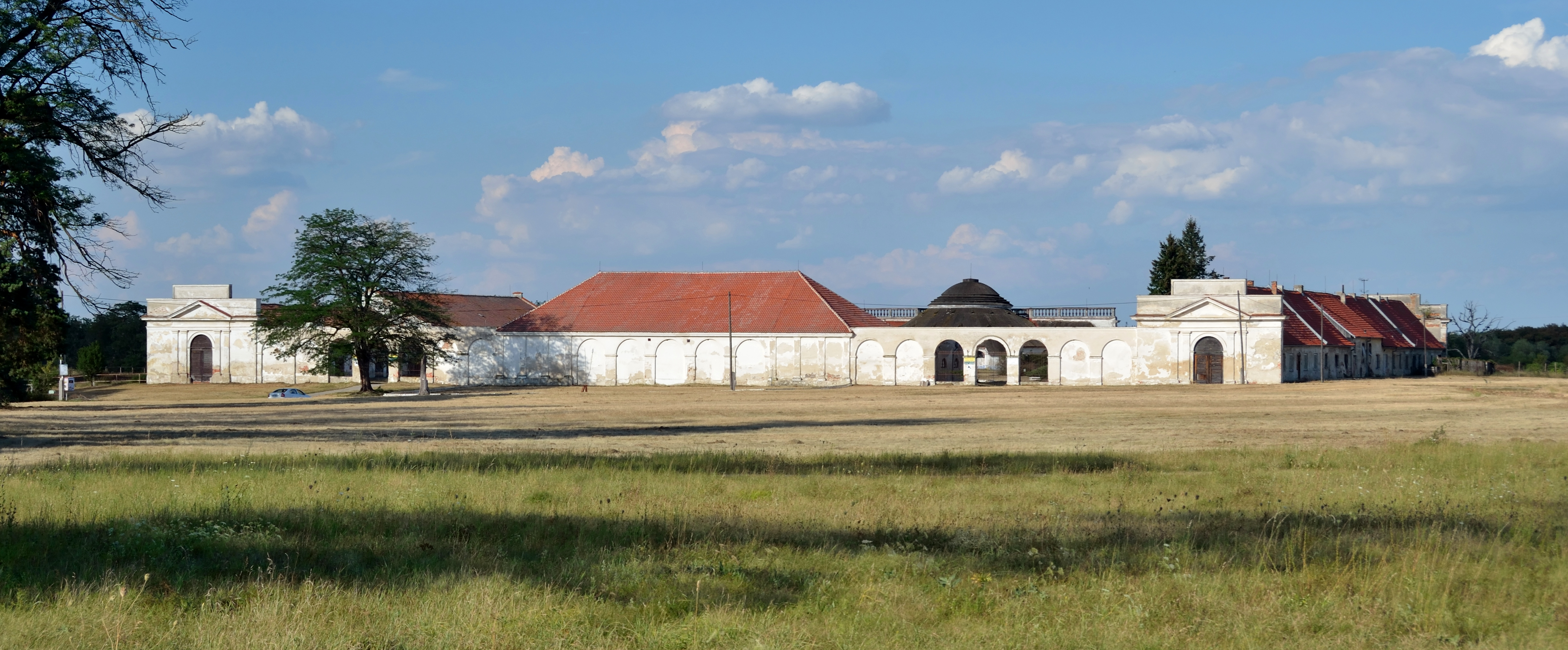
Nový dvůr

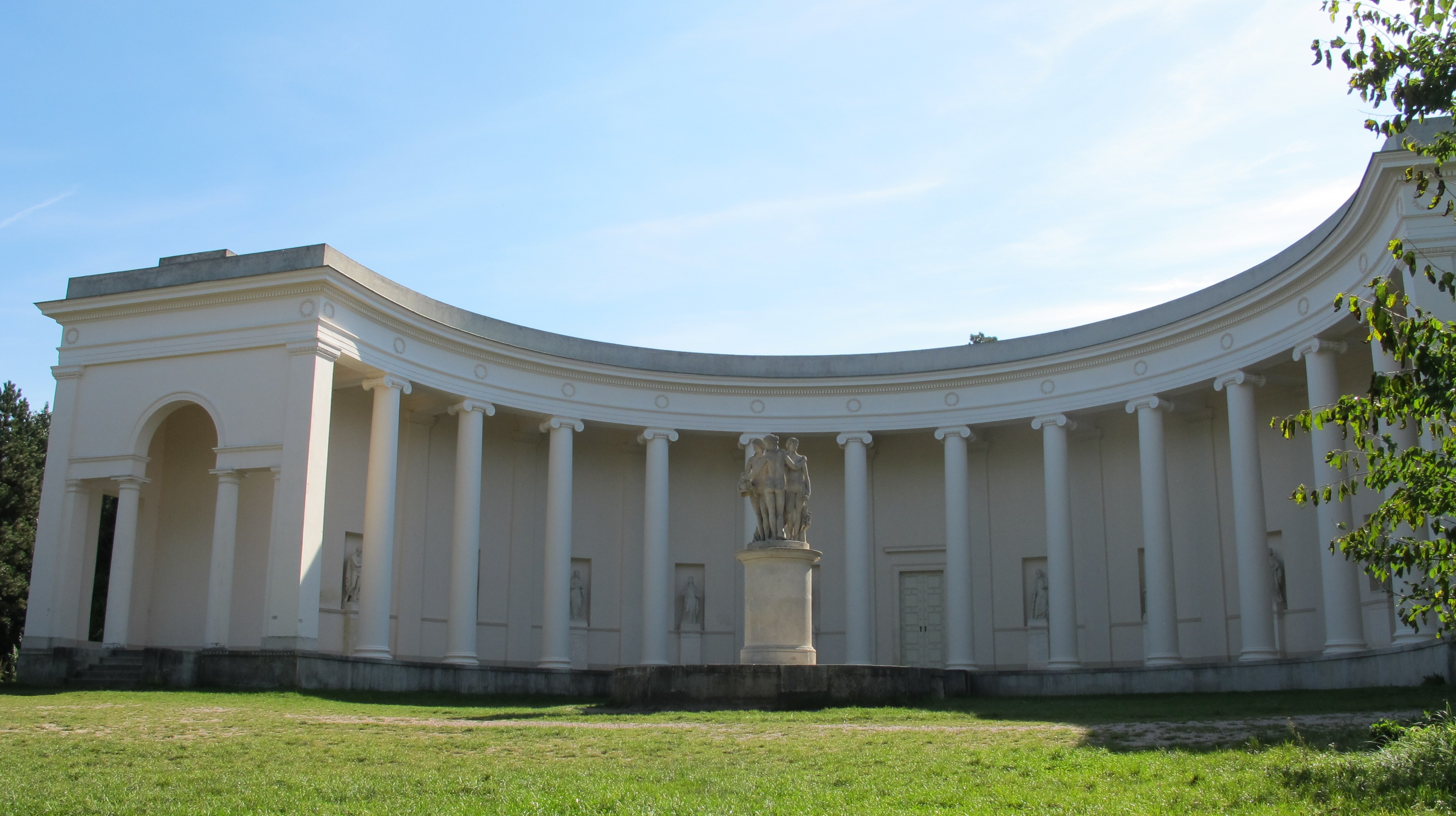
Temple of the Three Graces

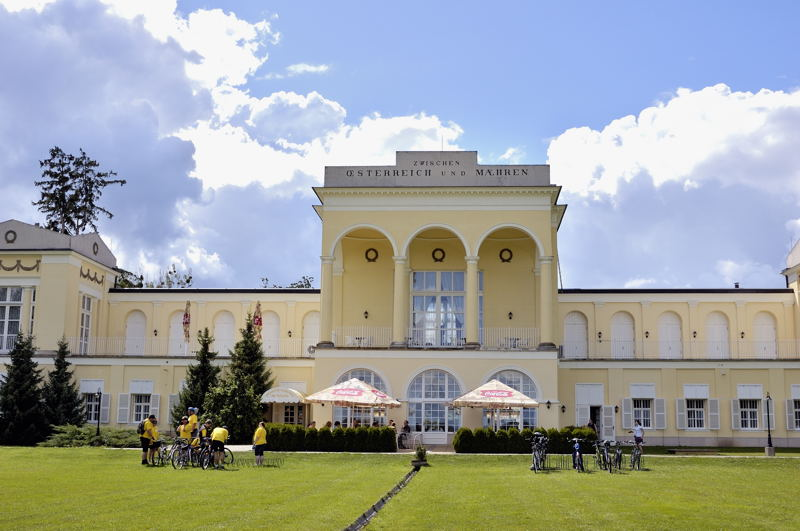
Border House

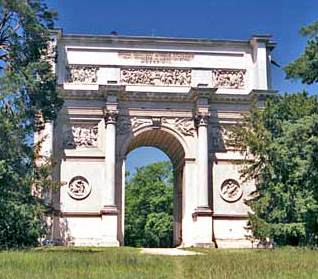
Rendezvous (Temple of Diana)

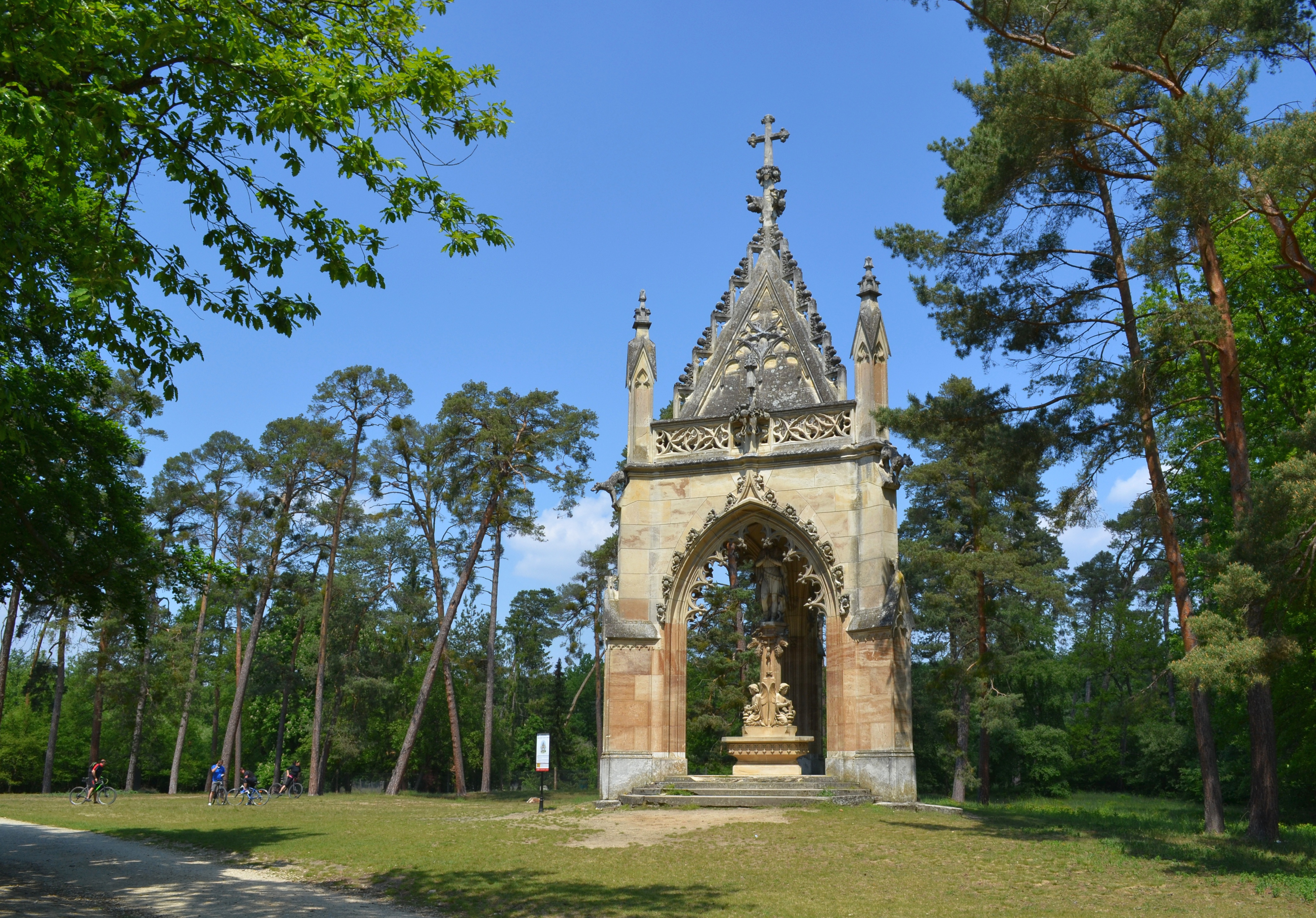
St Hubert Chapel

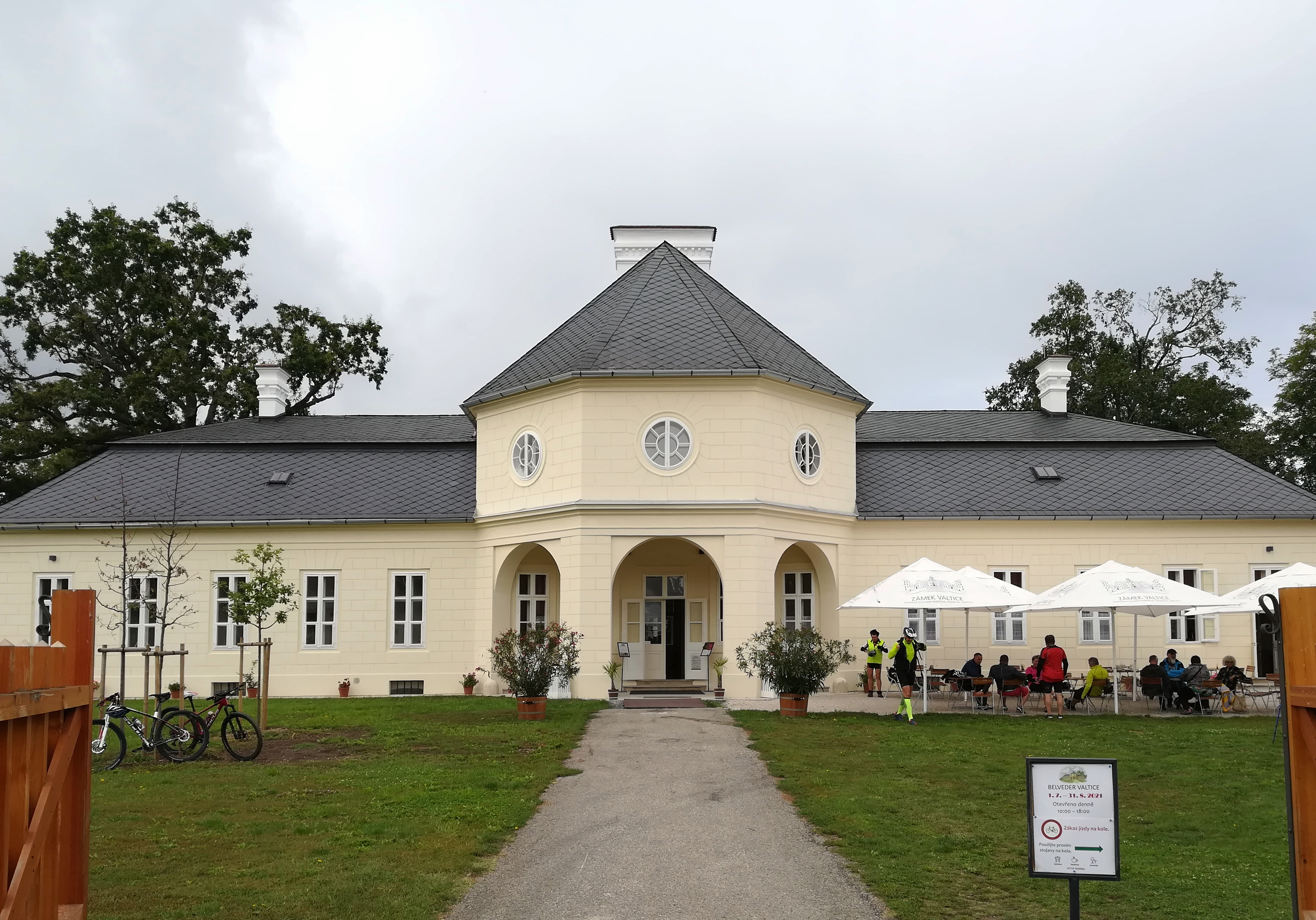
Belvedere

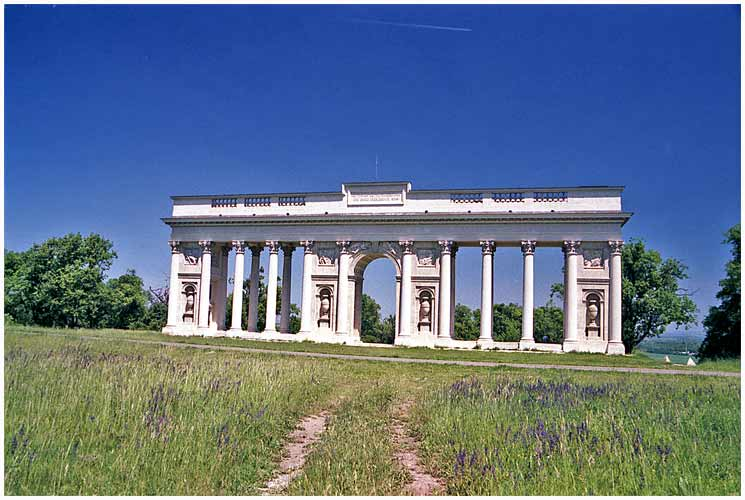
The Colonnade − Rajsna

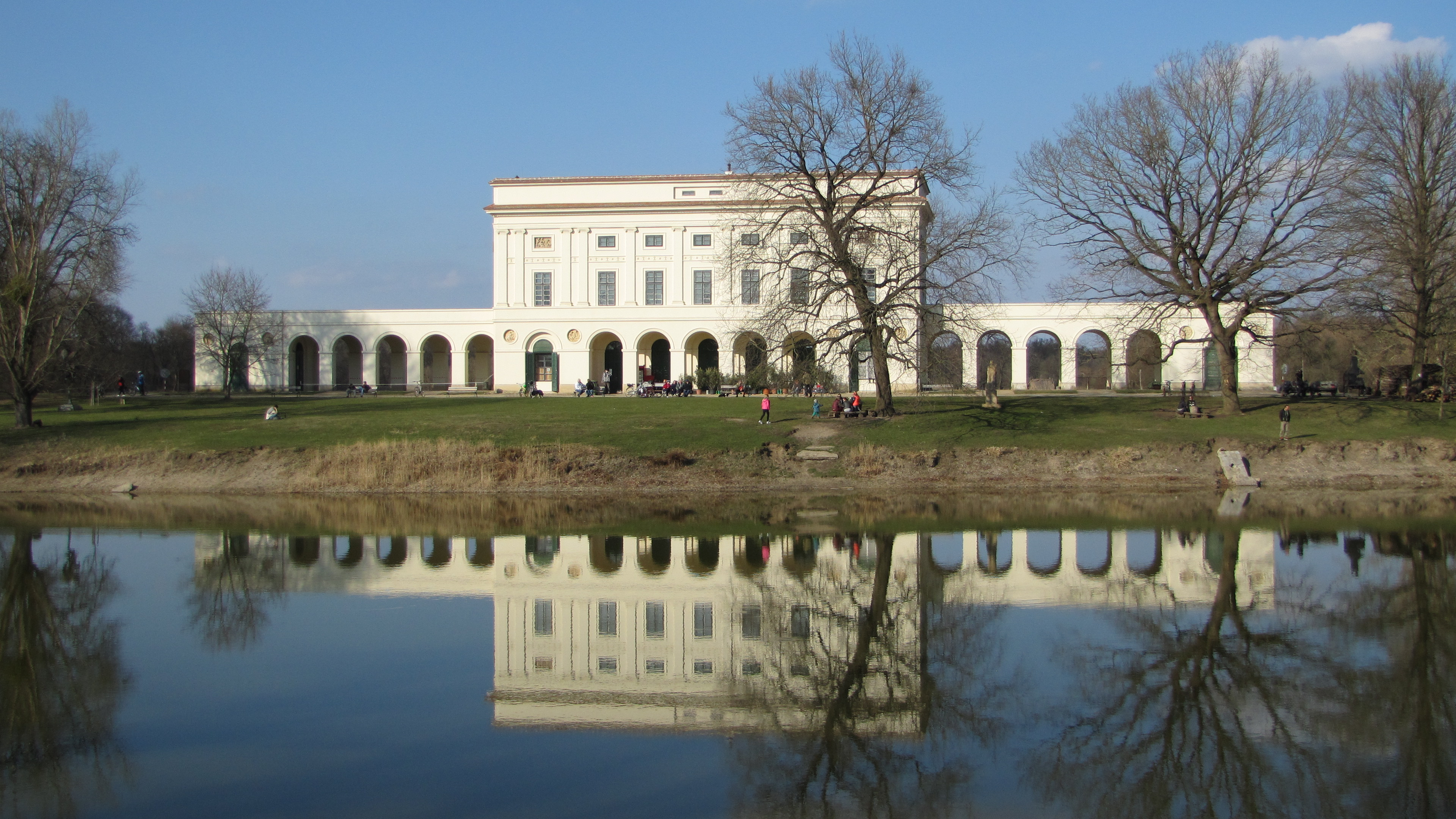
Pohansko

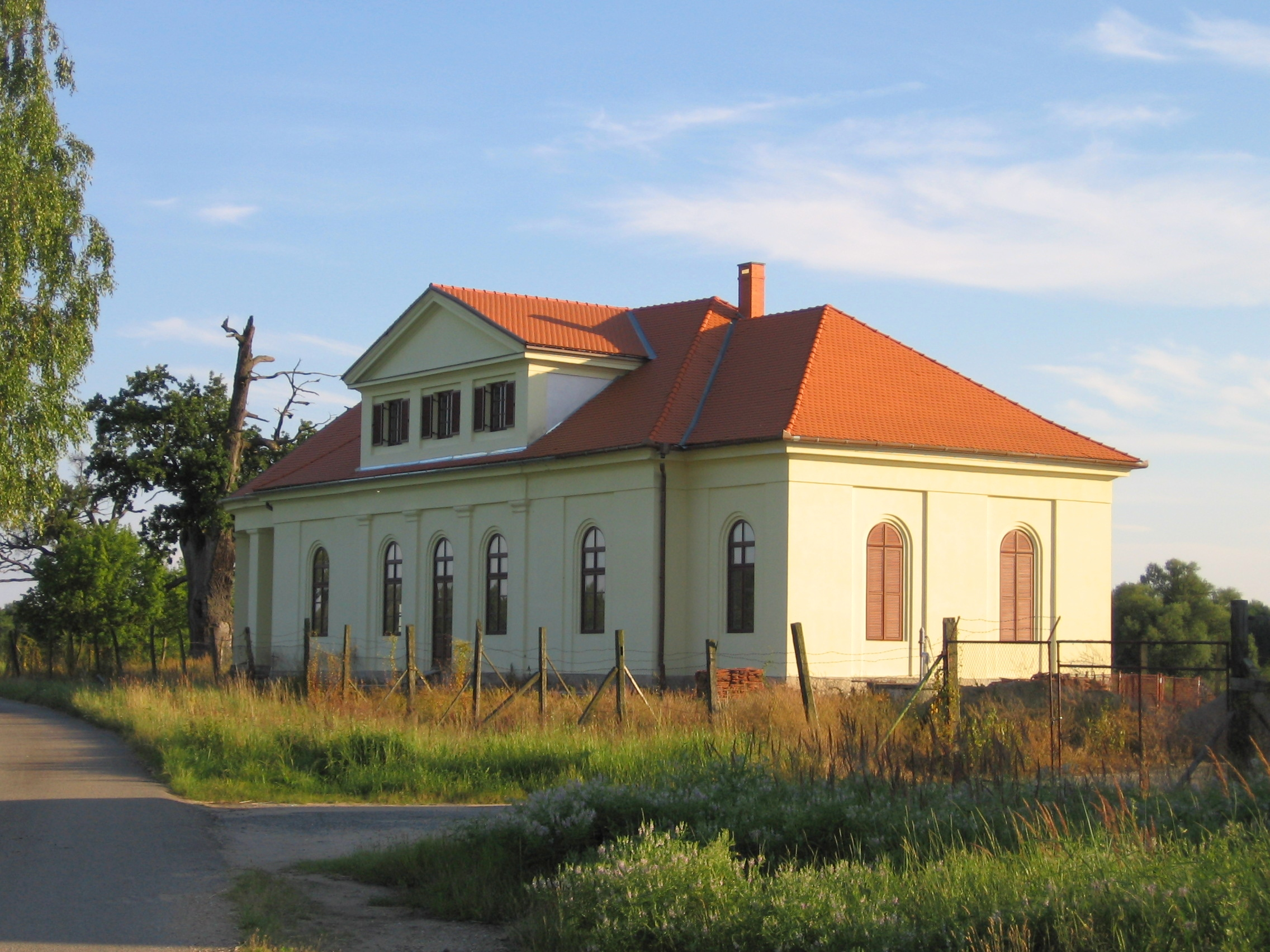
Lány
