= Hugo Zuckermann =

Jewish-Austrian poet and Zionist (1881–1914)

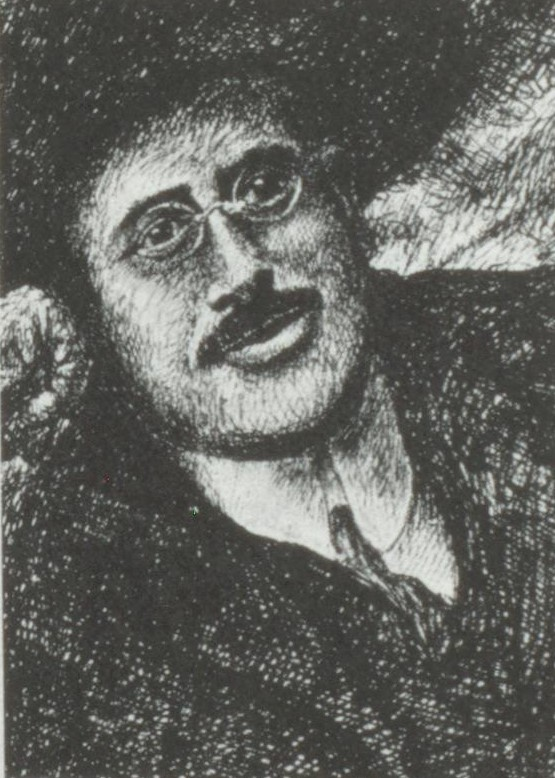
- Born: May 15, 1881; Cheb (then Austria-Hungary)
- Died: December 23, 1914; Eger (then Austria-Hungary)
- Occupations: Poet, lawyer
- Known for: Zionist poetry; Österreichisches Reiterlied

Hugo Zuckermann (15 May 1881 – 23 December 1914) was a Jewish-Austrian poet and Zionist.

Zuckermann was born in Cheb.

During his studies in Vienna, he became a member of the Theodor Herzl Association of Zionist University Students and later of the Jewish academic fraternity Libanonia.

In 1907 he founded, together with writer Oskar Rosenfeld, Egon Brecher and others a Jewish theatre group to play modern Yiddish dramas in the German language. The initiative lasted for one or two years. Later he became a lawyer in Meran. He fell early in the First World War after having written the very popular "Österreichisches Reiterlied". His work, published in one volume with an introduction by Otto Abeles in 1915, consists of poems including some translations from the Bible (Shir Hashirim, psalms). He also translated poems by Isaac Leib Peretz, Sholem Asch, Abraham Reisen, S. Schneir and other Yiddish authors. He died in Eger.

== Literature ==
- Meier M. Reschke, Hugo Zuckermann: A Great Jewish Leader, Vantage Pr., 1985. ISBN 0-533-06136-9
- Hugo Zuckermann, Gedichte (edited by Otto Abeles), R. Löwit Verlag, Wien, 1915.
