= Kyjovka =

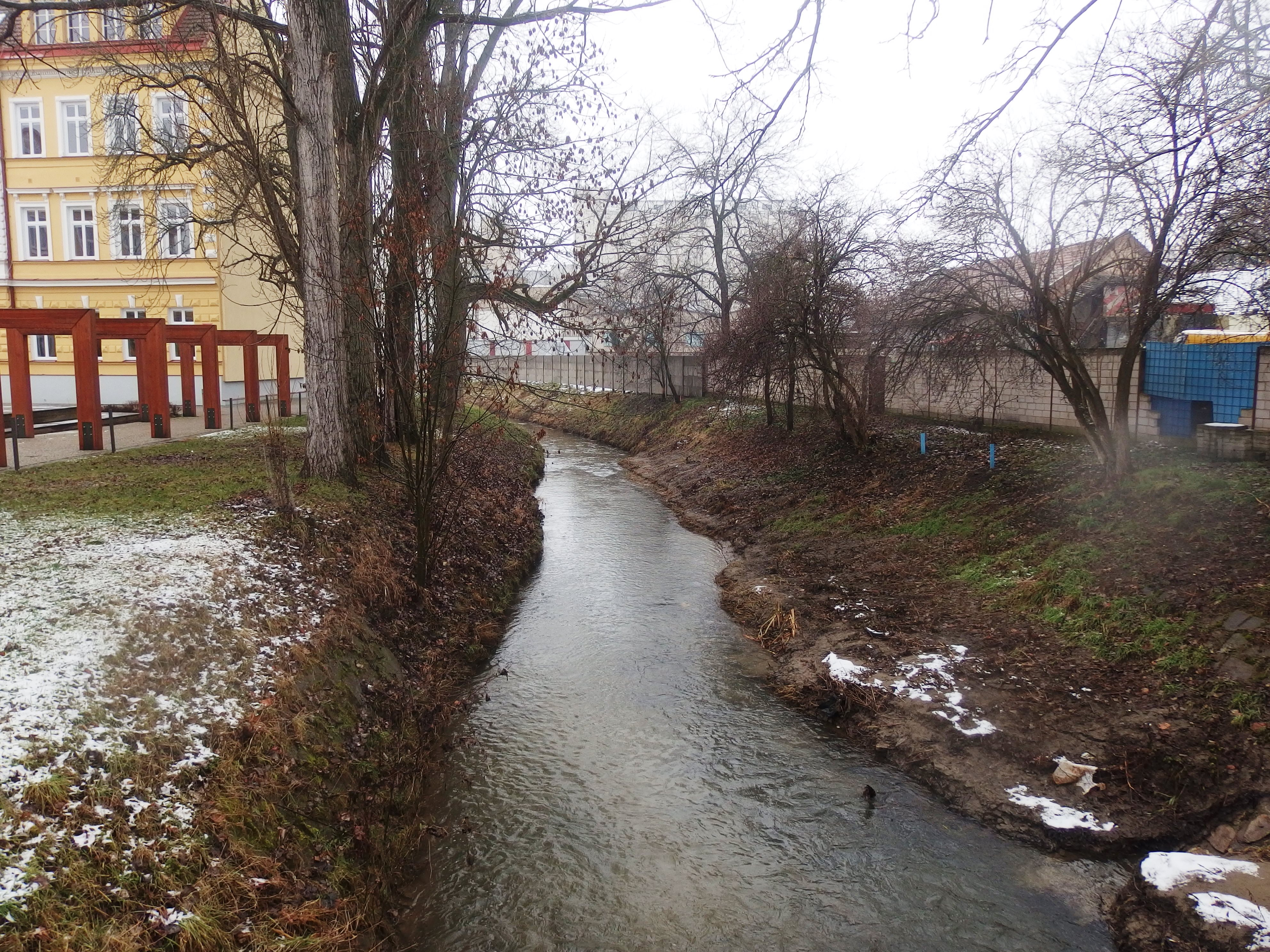
- The Kyjovka in Kyjov

Location
- Country: Czech Republic
- Regions: South Moravian; Zlín

Physical characteristics
- Source
  - location: Staré Hutě, Chřiby
  - coordinates: 49°9′37″N 17°17′5″E
  - elevation: 526 m (1,726 ft)
- Mouth
  - location: Thaya
  - coordinates: 48°38′57″N 16°55′15″E
  - elevation: 152 m (499 ft)
- Length: 88.1 km (54.7 mi)
- Basin size: 678.3 km^{2} (261.9 sq mi)
- Discharge
  - average: 0.82 m^{3}/s (29 cu ft/s) near estuary

Basin features
- Progression: Thaya→ Morava→ Danube→ Black Sea

The Kyjovka (Czech pronunciation: [ˈkɪjofka]; also known as Stupava) is a river in the Czech Republic, a left tributary of the Thaya River. It flows through the South Moravian and Zlín regions. It is 88.1 km (54.7 mi) long.

== Etymology ==
The river is named after the town of Kyjov.

== Characteristic ==
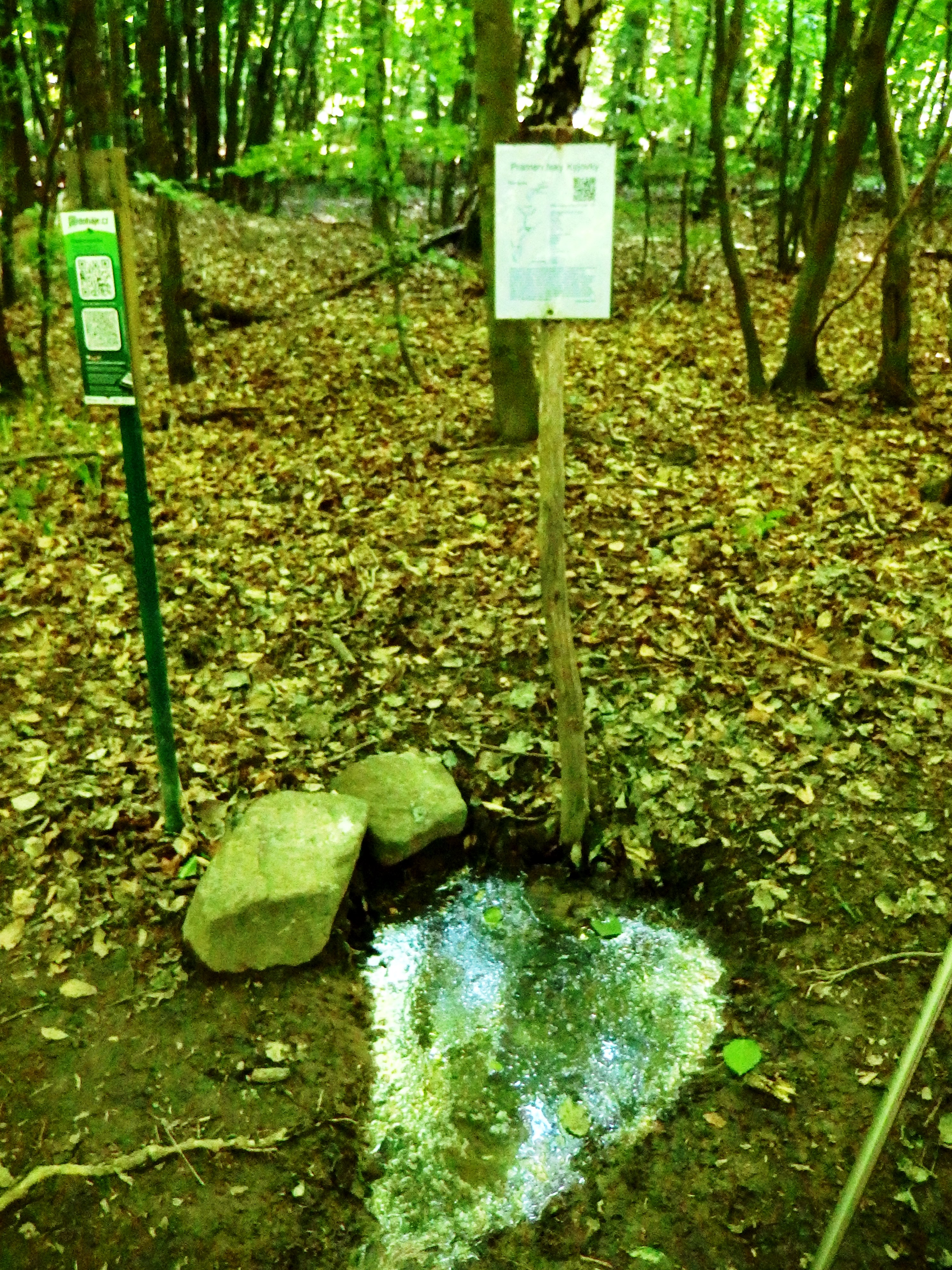
Spring of the Kyjovka

The Kyjovka originates in the territory of Staré Hutě in the Chřiby range at an elevation of 526 m (1,726 ft) and flows to Lanžhot, where it enters the Thaya River at an elevation of 152 m (499 ft). It is 88.1 km (54.7 mi) long. Its drainage basin has an area of 678.3 km^{2} (261.9 sq mi).

The longest tributaries of the Kyjovka are:

Tributary	Length (km)	Side
Kopanice	31.9	left
Hruškovice	24.7	right
Prušánka	24.5	right
Svodnice	18.5	right
Šardický potok	11.2	right
Sobůlský potok	7.6	right

== Course ==
The most notable settlement on the river is the town of Kyjov. The river also flows along the municipal border of Hodonín. The river flows through the municipal territories of Staré Hutě, Stupava, Koryčany, Mouchnice, Nemotice, Snovídky, Kyjov, Svatobořice-Mistřín, Dubňany, Mutěnice, Hodonín, Lužice, Mikulčice, Moravská Nová Ves, Týnec, Tvrdonice, Kostice and Lanžhot.

== Bodies of water ==
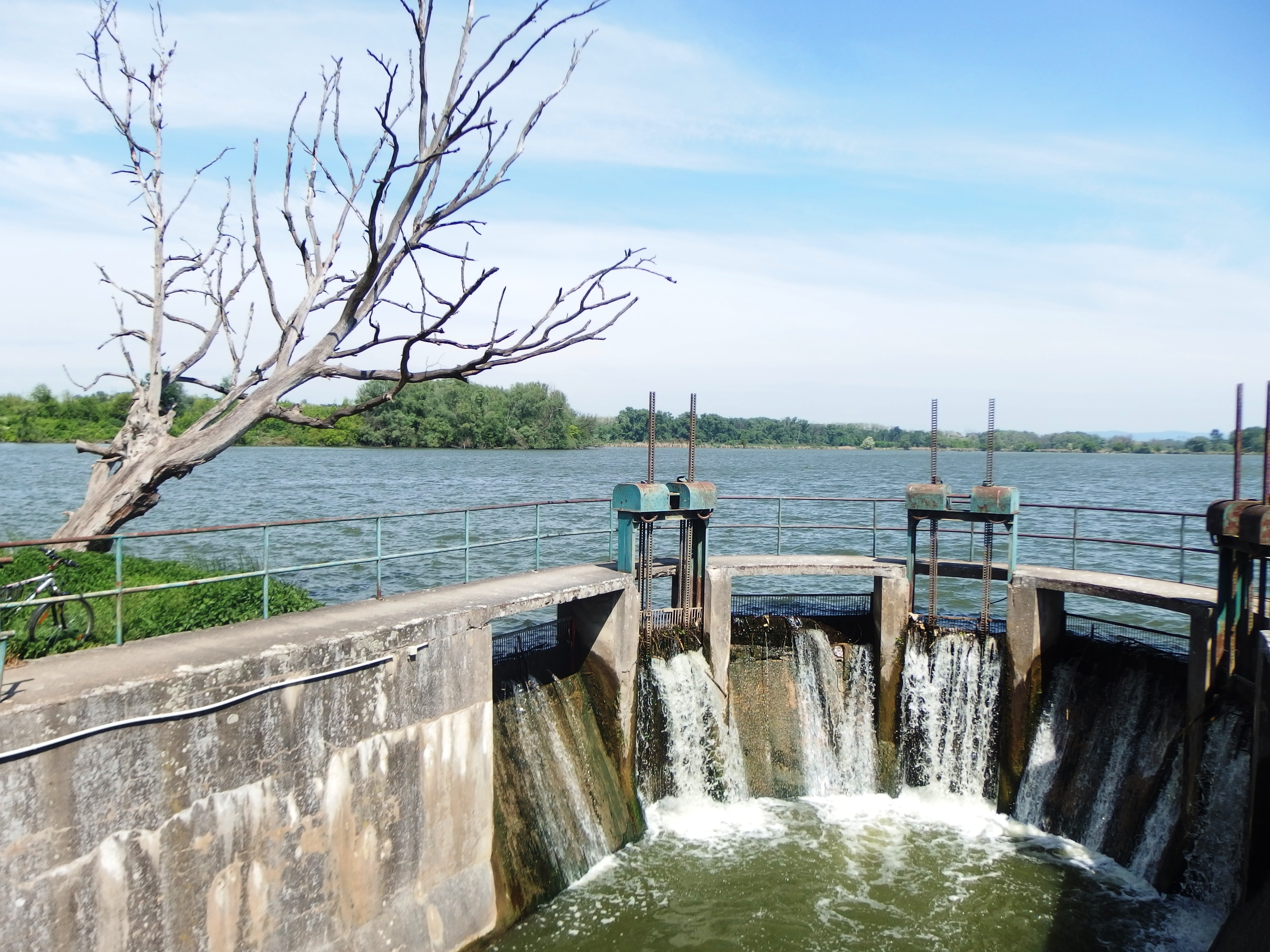
Jarohněvický rybník

There are 324 bodies of water in the basin area. The Koryčany Reservoir and many fishponds are constructed on or near the river. The largest body of water is the fishpond Jarohněvický rybník with an area of 88.9 ha (220 acres), built directly on the Kyjovka. The Hodonín and Mutěnice pond systems are notable for their total area and importance for fish breeding and as a nesting and refuge area for birds.

== Fauna ==
Common species of fish in the river are Eurasian carp, northern pike and wels catfish. Among the rare species is the Amur bitterling.

== See also ==
- List of rivers of the Czech Republic
