= Stupava =

Stupava may refer to:

- Stupava, Slovakia, a town in Slovakia
- Stupava, Czech Republic, a village in the Czech Republic
