= Dubňany =

- Town
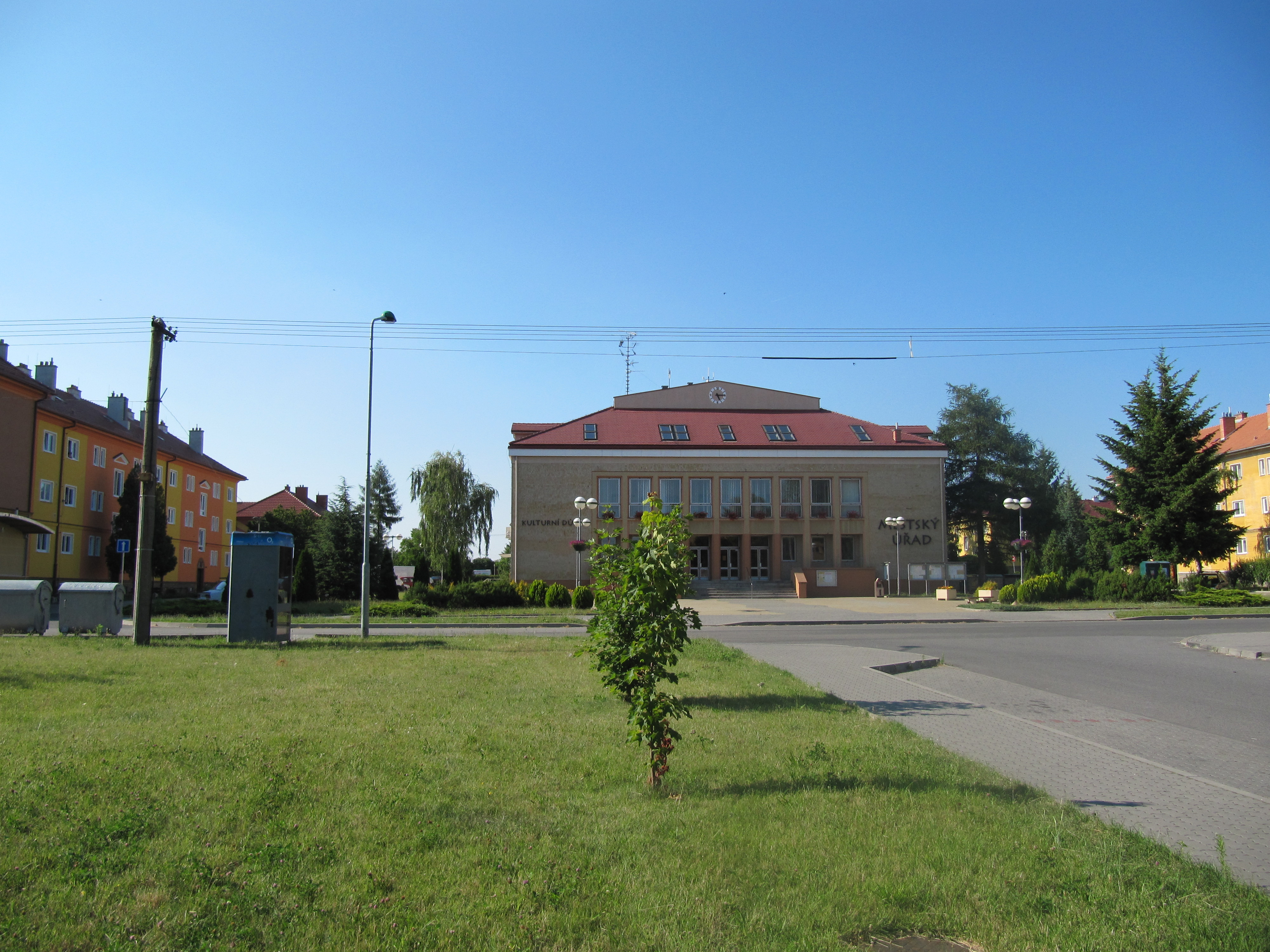
- Town square with the town hall

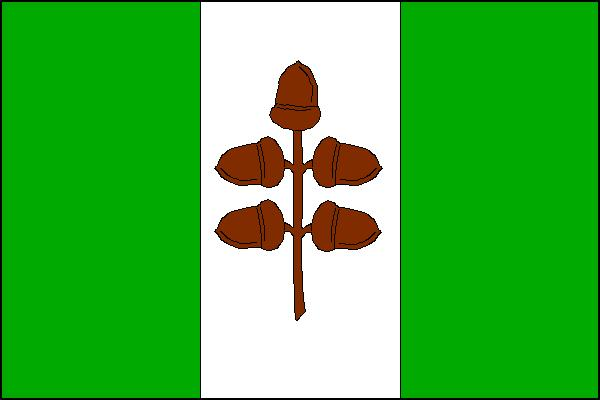
- Flag Coat of arms

- Location in the Czech Republic
- Coordinates: 48°55′1″N 17°5′24″E
- Country: Czech Republic
- Region: South Moravian
- District: Hodonín
- First mentioned: 1349

Government
  - Mayor: Zbyněk Lysý

Area
  - Total: 22.58 km^{2} (8.72 sq mi)
- Elevation: 200 m (660 ft)

Population (2026-01-01)
  - Total: 6,179
  - Density: 273.6/km^{2} (708.7/sq mi)
- Time zone: UTC+1 (CET)
  - Summer (DST): UTC+2 (CEST)
- Postal code: 696 03
- Website: www.dubnany.eu

Dubňany (Czech pronunciation: [ˈdubɲanɪ]) is a town in Hodonín District in the South Moravian Region of the Czech Republic. It has about 6,200 inhabitants. The town is located near the Kyjovka River in the Lower Morava Valley.

== Geography ==
Dubňany is located about 7 kilometres (4 mi) north of Hodonín and 45 km (28 mi) southeast of Brno. It lies in a flat landscape in the Lower Morava Valley. The Kyjovka River flows west of the town and supplies several fishponds there. The pond Jarohněvický rybník has an area of 88.9 hectares (220 acres) and is one of the largest bodies of water in the region.

== History ==
The first written mention of Dubňany is from 1349. Dubňany became economically significant in the 19th century, when coal mining and glassmaking developed. It was promoted to a town in 1964.

== Demographics ==
Historical population

Year	Pop.	±%
1869	2,001	—
1880	2,449	+22.4%
1890	2,792	+14.0%
1900	3,154	+13.0%
1910	3,842	+21.8%

Year	Pop.	±%
1921	4,067	+5.9%
1930	3,557	−12.5%
1950	3,924	+10.3%
1961	6,418	+63.6%
1970	6,784	+5.7%

Year	Pop.	±%
1980	6,912	+1.9%
1991	6,512	−5.8%
2001	6,661	+2.3%
2011	6,208	−6.8%
2021	6,017	−3.1%

Source: Censuses

== Economy ==
In Dubňany is one of the largest photovoltaic power stations in the Czech Republic. It has an instantaneous power of 2100 kW.

== Transport ==
There are no railways or major roads passing through the municipal territory.

== Sights ==
The main landmark od Dubňany is the Church of Saint Joseph from 1885.

== Notable people ==
- Ludwig Dupal (1913–?), football player and manager
- Ludvík Podéšť (1921–1968), composer and conductor
