= Egon Brecher =

Austrian-American actor and director (1880–1946)

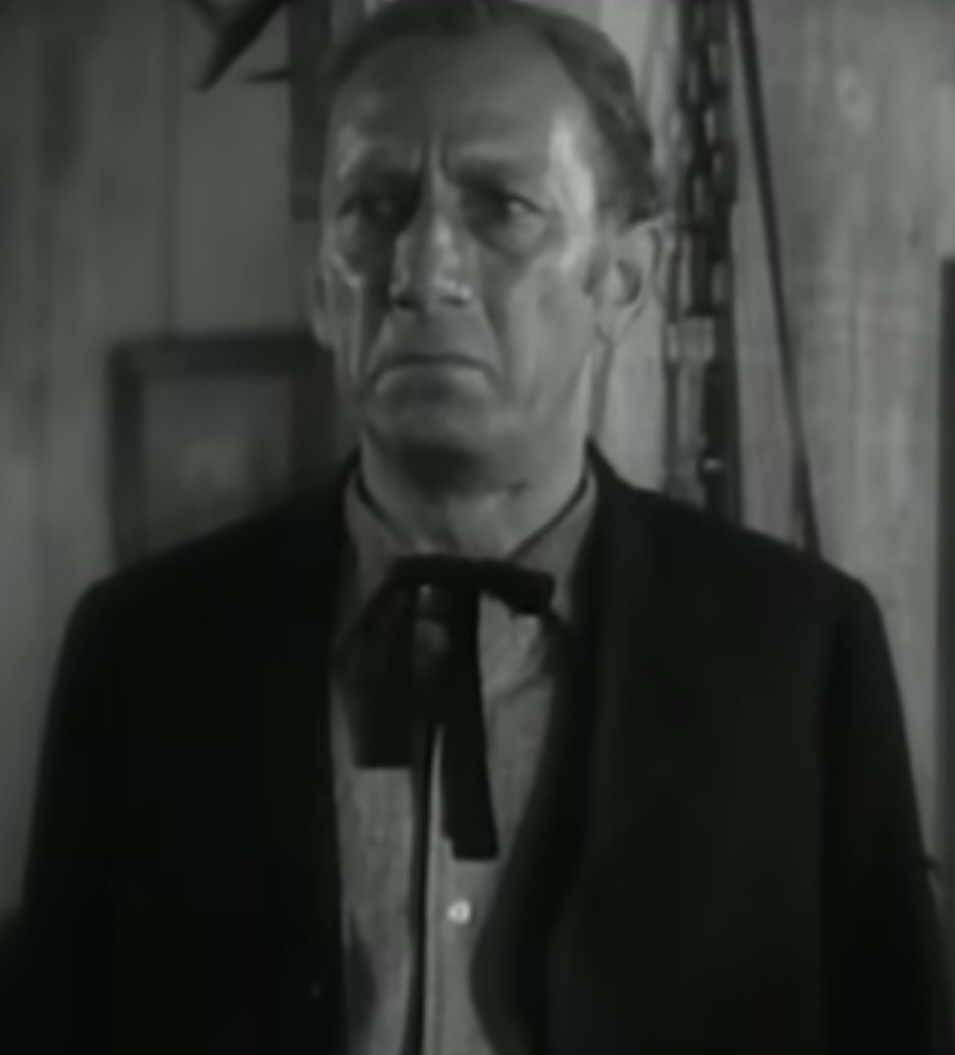
- Brecher in To the Last Man (1933)
- Born: 18 February 1880; Olomouc, Austria-Hungary
- Died: 12 October 1946 (aged 66); Hollywood, California, U.S.
- Resting place: Hollywood Forever Cemetery
- Occupation: Actor
- Years active: 1903–1946
- Spouse: Else Vogelhut
- Children: 1

Egon Brecher (18 February 1880 – 12 August 1946) was an Austrian-born American actor and director. He also served as the chief director of Vienna's Stadttheater, before entering the motion picture industry.

== Early years ==
Brecher was born on 18 February 1880 in Olomouc, Moravia, Austria-Hungary (now the Czech Republic). The son of a professor, Brecher began studying philosophy in 1899 at the University of Heidelberg in Germany. He did not finish his studies, deciding instead to become an actor.

== Career ==
He appeared on several provincial stages in Germany and Austria until 1910, and then played in Vienna on various occasions, directed by Josef Jarno until 1921.

In 1907, he founded an initiative (which lasted for one or two years) to play modern Yiddish theatre in German language with Siegfried Schmitz and members of the student club ‘Theodor Herzl’ like Hugo Zuckermann and Oskar Rosenfeld. In 1919, he was a co-founder, along with Isaak Deutsch, Jacob Mestel, and others, of the Freie Jüdische Volksbühne in Vienna, a Yiddish theatre, which existed until 1922.

In 1906 and 1911, he visited New York to act in plays in that city's robust Yiddish Theatre. In 1921, he moved to New York to act on Broadway. In the latter half of the 1920s, he was stage director and leading man for the theatrical troupe headed by Eva Le Gallienne. He moved to Hollywood in the late 1920s to appear in foreign-language versions of American films. In the mid-1930s he appeared in classic horror films The Black Cat, Werewolf of London, The Black Room, Mark of the Vampire and The Devil-Doll, and worked steadily in the espionage films of the 1930s and 1940s, his Slavic accent landing him roles both noble and villainous. One of his largest screen roles was in 1946's So Dark the Night.

== Death ==
Brecher died on 12 August 1946, aged 66, of a heart attack at Cedars of Lebanon Hospital in Hollywood, California. He is buried at Hollywood Forever Cemetery in Hollywood.

== Selected filmography ==
- The Spendthrift (1917)
- Don Cesar, Count of Irun (1918) - Don Jose
- The Royal Box (1929) - Count Toeroek
- To the Last Man (1933) - Mark Hayden
- Convention City (1933) - Zorb
- As the Earth Turns (1934) - Mr. Janowski
- No Greater Glory (1934) - Professor Racz
- The Black Cat (1934) - The Majordomo
- Many Happy Returns (1934) - Dr. Otto von Strudel
- Now and Forever (1934) - Doctor (uncredited)
- The Florentine Dagger (1935) - Karl
- Black Fury (1935) - Alec Novak
- Mark of the Vampire (1935) - Coroner (uncredited)
- Air Hawks (1935) - Leon - Hideout Caretaker (uncredited)
- Werewolf of London (1935) - Priest (uncredited)
- The Awakening of Jim Burke (1935) - Mahler (uncredited)
- The Black Room (1935) - Karl - Lead Villager (uncredited)
- Here's to Romance (1935) - Descartes
- Three Live Ghosts (1936) - German Officer (uncredited)
- Charlie Chan's Secret (1936) - Ulrich
- Paddy O'Day (1936) - Russian Musician (uncredited)
- Boulder Dam (1936) - Pa Vangarick
- Till We Meet Again (1936) - Schultz
- Sins of Man (1936) - Doctor
- The White Angel (1936) - Pastor Fliedner
- The Devil-Doll (1936) - Detective (uncredited)
- Anthony Adverse (1936) - Innkeeper (uncredited)
- Alibi for Murder (1936) - Sir Conrad Stava
- Ladies in Love (1936) - Concierge
- Come and Get It (1936) - Mr. Schwerke (uncredited)
- Love on the Run (1936) - Dr. Stefan Gorsay (uncredited)
- One in a Million (1936) - Olympic Chairman (uncredited)
- Black Legion (1937) - Old Man Dombrowski
- Stolen Holiday (1937) - Deputy Bergery
- The Great O'Malley (1937) - Morris - the Pawnbroker (uncredited)
- Espionage (1937) - Chief of Police
- Thin Ice (1937) - Janitor
- I Met Him in Paris (1937) - Emile - Upper Sled Run Tower Control
- The Emperor's Candlesticks (1937) - Czakova - Chief of Police (uncredited)
- The Life of Emile Zola (1937) - Brucker (uncredited)
- Love Under Fire (1937) - Civilian (uncredited)
- The Women Men Marry (1937) - John (uncredited)
- Lancer Spy (1937) - Bendiner (uncredited)
- Heidi (1937) - Inn Keeper
- Beg, Borrow or Steal (1937) - Antique Shop Proprietor (uncredited)
- The Spy Ring (1938) - General A. R. Bowen
- Blondes at Work (1938) - J.Z. Beckman (uncredited)
- Arsène Lupin Returns (1938) - Vasseur (uncredited)
- Invisible Enemy (1938) - Kirman
- Cocoanut Grove (1938) - Pawnbroker (uncredited)
- You and Me (1938) - Mr. Levins
- Racket Busters (1938) - Peters (uncredited)
- I'll Give a Million (1938) - Citizen
- Gateway (1938) - Rabbi (uncredited)
- Spawn of the North (1938) - Erickson (uncredited)
- Suez (1938) - Doctor
- Spring Madness (1938) - Soviet Travel Bureau Agent (uncredited)
- Devil's Island (1939) - Debriac
- The Three Musketeers (1939) - Landlord
- Hotel Imperial (1939) - Pograncz (uncredited)
- Juarez (1939) - Baron von Magnus (uncredited)
- Confessions of a Nazi Spy (1939) - Fritz Muller - German Agent (uncredited)
- Chasing Danger (1939) - Naval Doctor (uncredited)
- The Angels Wash Their Faces (1939) - Mr. Smith
- Nurse Edith Cavell (1939) - Dr. Gunther
- Espionage Agent (1939) - Larsch
- We Are Not Alone (1939) - Mr. Adolf Schiller (uncredited)
- Judge Hardy and Son (1939) - Mr. Anton Volduzzi
- Calling Philo Vance (1940) - Austrian Judge (uncredited)
- Dr. Ehrlich's Magic Bullet (1940) - Martl (uncredited)
- Rebecca (1940) - Hotel Desk Clerk (uncredited)
- I Was an Adventuress (1940) - Jacques Dubois
- Four Sons (1940) - Richter
- All This, and Heaven Too (1940) - Doctor (uncredited)
- The Man I Married (1940) - Czech
- Knute Rockne All American (1940) - Elder in Norway (uncredited)
- A Dispatch from Reuters (1940) - Von Konstat (uncredited)
- Four Mothers (1941) - Music Foundation Director (uncredited)
- They Dare Not Love (1941) - Prof. Keller
- Man Hunt (1941) - Pawnbroker
- Underground (1941) - Herr Director
- Manpower (1941) - Pop Duval
- All Through the Night (1942) - Art Gallery Watchman (uncredited)
- Kings Row (1942) - Dr. Candell
- Berlin Correspondent (1942) - Prisoner (uncredited)
- Isle of Missing Men (1942) - Richard Heller
- The Navy Comes Through (1942) - U-Boat Commander (uncredited)
- Hitler's Children (1943) - Mr. Müller (uncredited)
- Chetniks! The Fighting Guerrillas (1943) - Chetnik (uncredited)
- The Purple V (1943) - Clerk (uncredited)
- Mission to Moscow (1943) - Heinrich Sahm (uncredited)
- They Came to Blow Up America (1943) - Kirschner (uncredited)
- Above Suspicion (1943) - Gestapo Official (uncredited)
- The Desert Song (1943) - French Colonel (uncredited)
- The Hitler Gang (1944) - Landsberg Warden (uncredited)
- The Hairy Ape (1944) - Refugee Violinist (uncredited)
- The Seventh Cross (1944) - Sexton (uncredited)
- U-Boat Prisoner (1944) - Prof. Van der Brek (uncredited)
- They Live in Fear (1944) - Heinrich Graffen (uncredited)
- A Royal Scandal (1945) - Wassilikow (uncredited)
- White Pongo (1945) - Dr. Gerig
- Cornered (1945) - Insurance Man (uncredited)
- The Diary of a Chambermaid (1946) - The Postman (uncredited)
- Just Before Dawn (1946) - Dr. Evans (uncredited)
- The Wife of Monte Cristo (1946) - Proprietor
- O.S.S. (1946) - Marcel Aubert
- Sister Kenny (1946) - Frenchman (uncredited)
- So Dark the Night (1946) - Dr. Boncourt
- Temptation (1946) - Ibrahim (uncredited)
- The Return of Monte Cristo (1946) - Island Doctor (uncredited) (final film role)

== Literature ==
- Brigitte Dalinger: Verloschene Sterne. Geschichte des jüdischen Theaters in Wien. (History of Jewish theatre in Vienna) Picus Verlag, Wien 1998, pp. 65, 198
