= Bohumil Sekla =

Bohumil Sekla (16 May 1901 – 7 August 1987) was a Czech biologist. He specialised in genetics and was known as an expert in determining parenthood by the biological-hereditary method.

== Life ==
Sekla was born in Bohuslavice, Moravia, Austria-Hungary (today a part of Kyjov, Czech Republic). He studied at Charles University in Prague, first history, then psychology and finally biology. After his studies he worked at the university and became one of the founders of modern genetics in Czechoslovakia. During 1933–1945, Sekla was the leader of Czechoslovak Eugenic Society (Československá eugenická společnost). During the 1950s, he needed to defend genetics against Lysenkoism. When this theory got discredited he got the chance to establish and lead modern research institutes (Department of Human and Medical Genetics of the Biological Institute in 1969 and Department of Medical Genetics of the Teaching Hospital in 1970). Due to political activity during Prague Spring, Sekla was forced into retirement but he continued to work as physician-specialist until 1985. He died on 7 August 1987 in Prague.
