= Ludwig Dupal =

Czech football player and coach (born 1913)

Personal information
- Date of birth: 17 April 1913
- Place of birth: Dubňany, Moravia, Austria-Hungary
- Positions: Striker; attacking midfielder

Senior career*
Years	Team	Apps	(Gls)
- SK Bata Zlin
1946–1947	Sochaux	37	(18)
1947–1949	RC Besançon	70	(17)

Managerial career
- 1947–1949: Besançon RC
- 1949–1950: Urania Genève
- 1950–1953: Lens
- 1953–1956: Monaco
- 1956–1959: Nantes
- 1960–1962: Sochaux
- 1962–1965: Forbach
- 1965–1967: Club Brugge
- 1967–1968: R.F.C. de Liège
- 1969–1970: Club Sportif de Hammam-Lif
- 1970–1971: Olympique Avignonnais
- * Club domestic league appearances and goals

Ludwig Dupal (born 17 April 1913, date of death unknown), also known as Louis Dupal, Ludvík Dupal or Ludwick Dupal, was a Czech football player and manager.

He played for SK Bata Zlin, FC Sochaux-Montbéliard and RC Besançon. After his playing career he became a coach in France, Switzerland, Belgium and Tunisia.
