= Ervin Rössler =

Croatian zoologist (1876–1933)

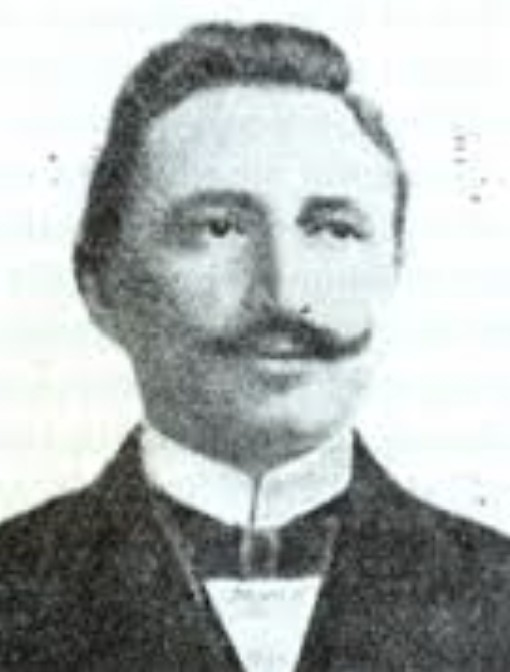
Ervin Rössler (c. 1905)

Ervin Rössler or Erwin Rößler (20 August 1876 – 6 January 1933) was a Croatian zoologist. He founded the Croatian ornithological centre and was involved in studies on bird migration. He also worked on fish biology and pisciculture. He was a professor at the Zagreb Forestry Academy.

Rössler was born in Kyjov, Moravia, and went to school in Osijek before going to the University of Zagreb. In 1893 he began to study bird migration in the Osijek area. He then worked a school teacher for a while and in 1900 he received a doctorate for his research on birds. In 1901 he founded the Croatian ornithological centre. In 1902 he published a list of the birds of Croatia. He also studied the lacertid lizards of the south Dalmatian islands. In 1904 he began to work on ornithology at the university while teaching in the faculty of agriculture and forestry zoology. In 1910 he organized systematic bird ringing in Croatia. From 1910 to 1928 he edited the hunting magazine Lovački vjesnik. In 1927–1929 he worked on fisheries, examining the prospect of carp breeding.
