= Oskar Rosenfeld =

Austrian writer and journalist

- Born: 13 May 1884; Koryčany, Kingdom of Bohemia, Austria-Hungary
- Died: August 1944 (age 60); Auschwitz-Birkenau, German-occupied Poland
- Cause of death: murdered in gas chamber
- Spouse: Henriette

Oskar Rosenfeld (13 May 1884 – August 1944) was an Austrian-Jewish writer killed at Auschwitz concentration camp.

== Biography ==
=== Early life and education ===
Oskar Rosenfeld was born on 13 May 1884 in Koryčany, Moravia to Jeanette Rosenfeld (Jellinek). Finished his studies in 1908 and earned a doctorate in Vienna on Philipp Otto Runge in the Romantics. Active in different Zionist organizations. Wrote for Jewish papers and journals such as Die Welt and Juedische Volkssimme, culture critics, about art, theater and literature. Was a member of Jewish “Hochschuelerverein Theodor Herzl”.

=== Career ===
1904 he was one of the founders of the Jewish youth and student newspaper Unsere Hoffnung ('Our Hope'). 1907 he founded, together with writer Hugo Zuckermann, Egon Brecher and others a Jewish theatre initiative, to play modern Yiddish dramas in German language. His first novel was Die vierte Galerie, published in 1910. In the First World War he served in the Austro-Hungarian Army in Sofia in the Austrian-Bulgarian Chamber of Commerce and was the chief editor of the Bulgarische Handelszeitung 1916–1918.

In 1920 six of Rosenfeld's novels were published under the title Tage und Naechte. He was active in the Judenstaatspartei. He worked as an editor of the Wiener Morgenzeitung. He co-founded the new Jewish theater in Vienna, Jüdische Künstlerspiele and translated classical and modern Yiddish literature, works of Mendele Mocher Sforim, Sholem Aleichem, Isaac Leib Peretz and Joshua Singer.

Rosenfeld started to work for the illustrated weekly Die neue Welt in 1929, later becoming its editor in chief. The 1938 Anschluss brought Rosenfeld's work in Vienna to an end. He and his wife, Henriette, emigrated to Prague, where he became a correspondent for The Jewish Chronicle.

=== World War II ===
In 1939, Rosenfeld's wife emigrated to England in anticipation of him following, but the outbreak of Second World War made his emigration impossible. In November 1941, Rosenfeld was deported to the Łódź Ghetto in Poland, along with 5,000 Jews from Prague. From June 1942 on, he worked in the Ghetto archive, where he took part in publication of the community's chronicle and wrote for its lexicon. His notebooks from this time were later published.

=== Death and afterward ===
In August 1944, Oskar Rosenfeld was deported to Auschwitz, where he was killed in a gas chamber.

His diary, written in the ghetto between 17 February 1942 and 28 July 1944 in a series of fifteen school notebooks, is kept at Yad Vashem in Jerusalem.

== Published works ==
- Philipp Otto in der Romantik, 1908
- Die vierte Galerie. Ein Wiener Roman, 1910
- Mendl Ruhig. Erzaehlung, 1914
- Tage und Nächte. Novellen, 1920
- Komoedianten. Nach Scholem Alechems Roman Irrende Sterne. 1930

Diary:

- Wozu noch Welt. Aufzeichnungen aus dem Getto Lodz“, Herausgegeben von Hanno Loewy, Verlag Neue Kritik, Frankfurt am Main, 1994
- In the beginning was the ghetto: notebooks from Łódź”, edited and with an introduction by Hanno Loewy; translated from the German by Brigitte M. Goldstein, Evanston, Ill. : Northwestern University Press, c2002
