= Staré Hutě =

- Municipality
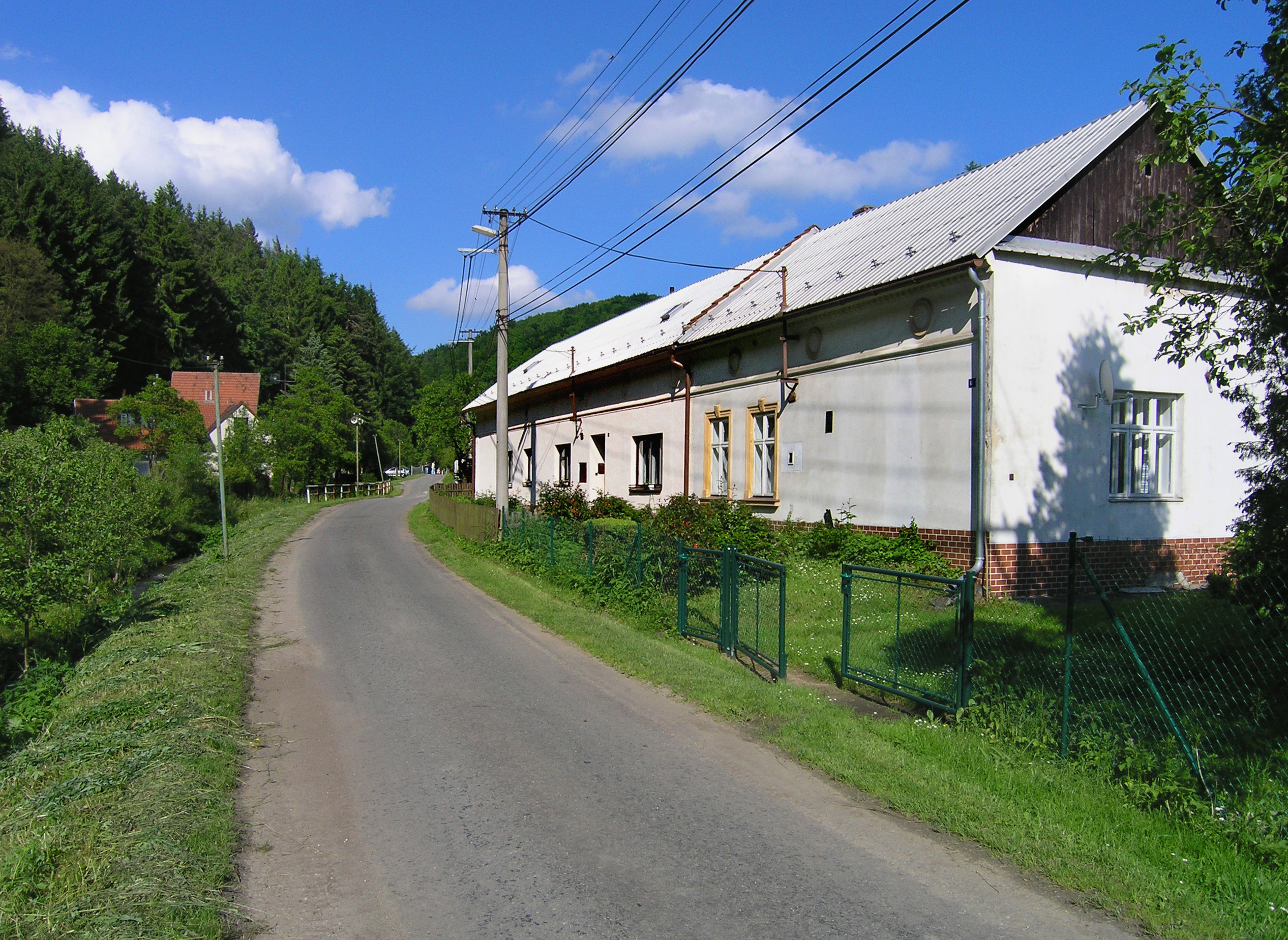
- Main street

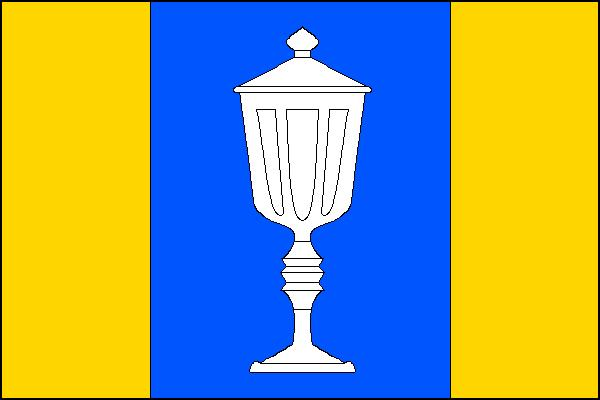
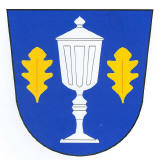
- Flag Coat of arms

- Location in the Czech Republic
- Coordinates: 49°7′45″N 17°16′40″E
- Country: Czech Republic
- Region: Zlín
- District: Uherské Hradiště
- First mentioned: 1665

Area
  - Total: 7.34 km^{2} (2.83 sq mi)
- Elevation: 393 m (1,289 ft)

Population (2026-01-01)
  - Total: 131
  - Density: 17.8/km^{2} (46.2/sq mi)
- Time zone: UTC+1 (CET)
  - Summer (DST): UTC+2 (CEST)
- Postal code: 686 01
- Website: www.starehute.cz

Staré Hutě (German: Althütten) is a municipality and village in Uherské Hradiště District in the Zlín Region of the Czech Republic. It has about 100 inhabitants.

Staré Hutě lies approximately 16 kilometres (10 mi) north-west of Uherské Hradiště, 31 km (19 mi) west of Zlín, and 232 km (144 mi) south-east of Prague. The Kyjovka River originates in the municipal territory.

== Demographics ==
Historical population
Year	Pop.	±%
1869	390	—
1880	333	−14.6%
1890	320	−3.9%
1900	282	−11.9%
1910	280	−0.7%
1921	261	−6.8%
1930	249	−4.6%
1950	240	−3.6%
1961	233	−2.9%
1970	191	−18.0%
1980	169	−11.5%
1991	120	−29.0%
2001	124	+3.3%
2011	127	+2.4%
2021	126	−0.8%
Source: Censuses
