= Snovídky =

Municipality in the South Moravian Region, Czech Republic

- Municipality
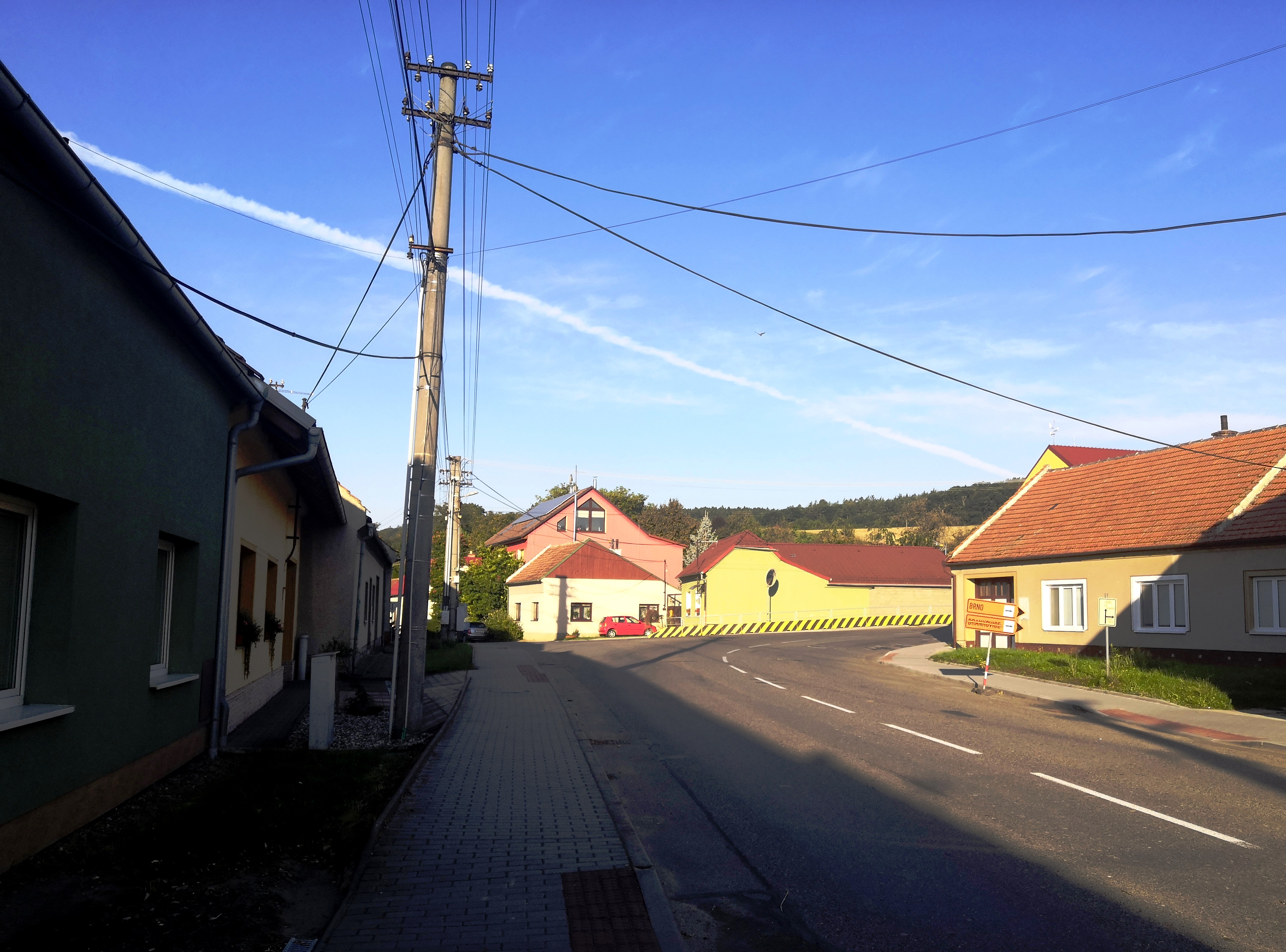
- Centre of Snovídky

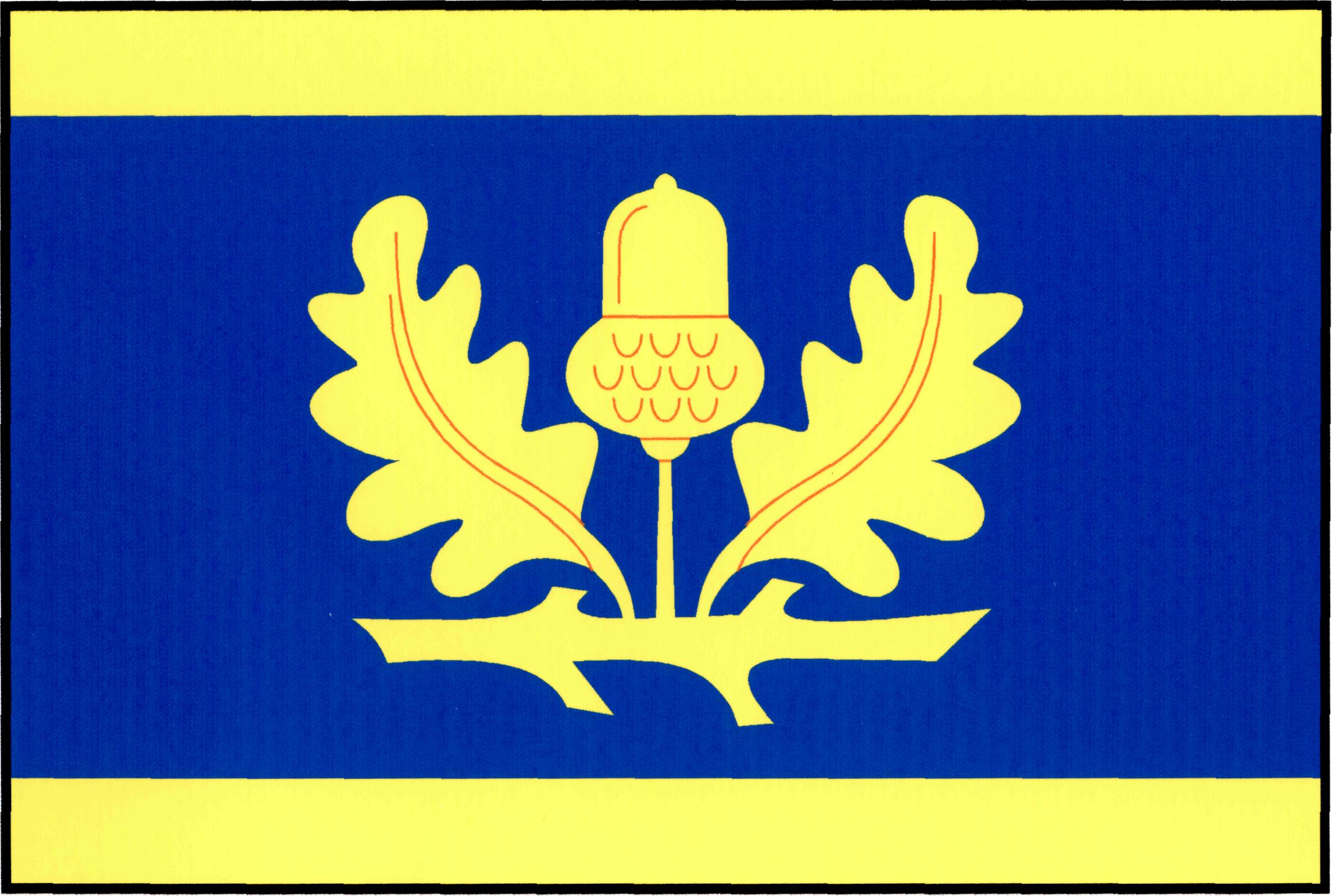
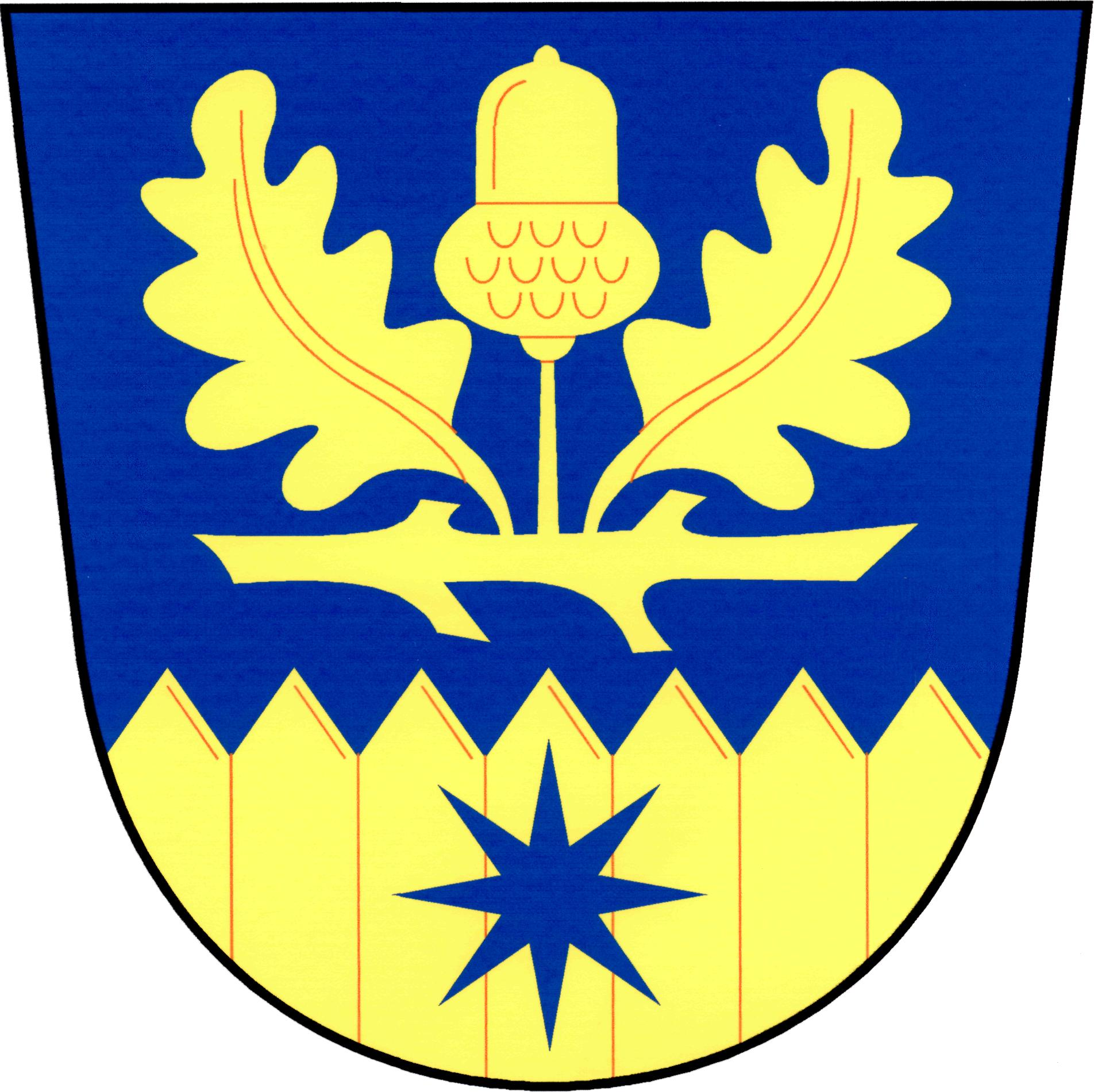
- Flag Coat of arms

- Location in the Czech Republic
- Coordinates: 49°7′58″N 17°6′23″E
- Country: Czech Republic
- Region: South Moravian
- District: Vyškov
- First mentioned: 1360

Area
  - Total: 10.57 km^{2} (4.08 sq mi)
- Elevation: 261 m (856 ft)

Population (2026-01-01)
  - Total: 316
  - Density: 29.9/km^{2} (77.4/sq mi)
- Time zone: UTC+1 (CET)
  - Summer (DST): UTC+2 (CEST)
- Postal code: 683 33
- Website: www.snovidky.eu

Snovídky is a municipality and village in Vyškov District in the South Moravian Region of the Czech Republic. It has about 300 inhabitants.

== Geography ==
Snovídky is located about 18 kilometres (11 mi) southeast of Vyškov and 34 km (21 mi) east of Brno. It lies mostly in the Ždánice Forest range, only a small part of the municipal territory in the north extends into the Litenčice Hills. The highest point is a nameless hill at 392 m (1,286 ft) above sea level. The Kyjovka River and several small streams flow through the municipality.

== History ==
The first written mention of Snovídky is from 1360. From the mid-15th century, the village belonged to the Bučovice estate and shared its owners.

== Demographics ==
Historical population

Year	Pop.	±%
1869	332	—
1880	400	+20.5%
1890	452	+13.0%
1900	485	+7.3%
1910	517	+6.6%

Year	Pop.	±%
1921	567	+9.7%
1930	572	+0.9%
1950	473	−17.3%
1961	510	+7.8%
1970	469	−8.0%

Year	Pop.	±%
1980	451	−3.8%
1991	378	−16.2%
2001	348	−7.9%
2011	348	+0.0%
2021	317	−8.9%

Source: Censuses

== Transport ==
The railway line Brno–Uherské Hradiště runs through the municipality, but there is no train station.

== Sights ==
There are no protected cultural monuments in the municipality. The main cultural landmark is the Chapel of the Virgin Mary, located in the centre of Snovídky.
