= Koryčany =

Town in the Zlín Region of the Czech Republic

- Town
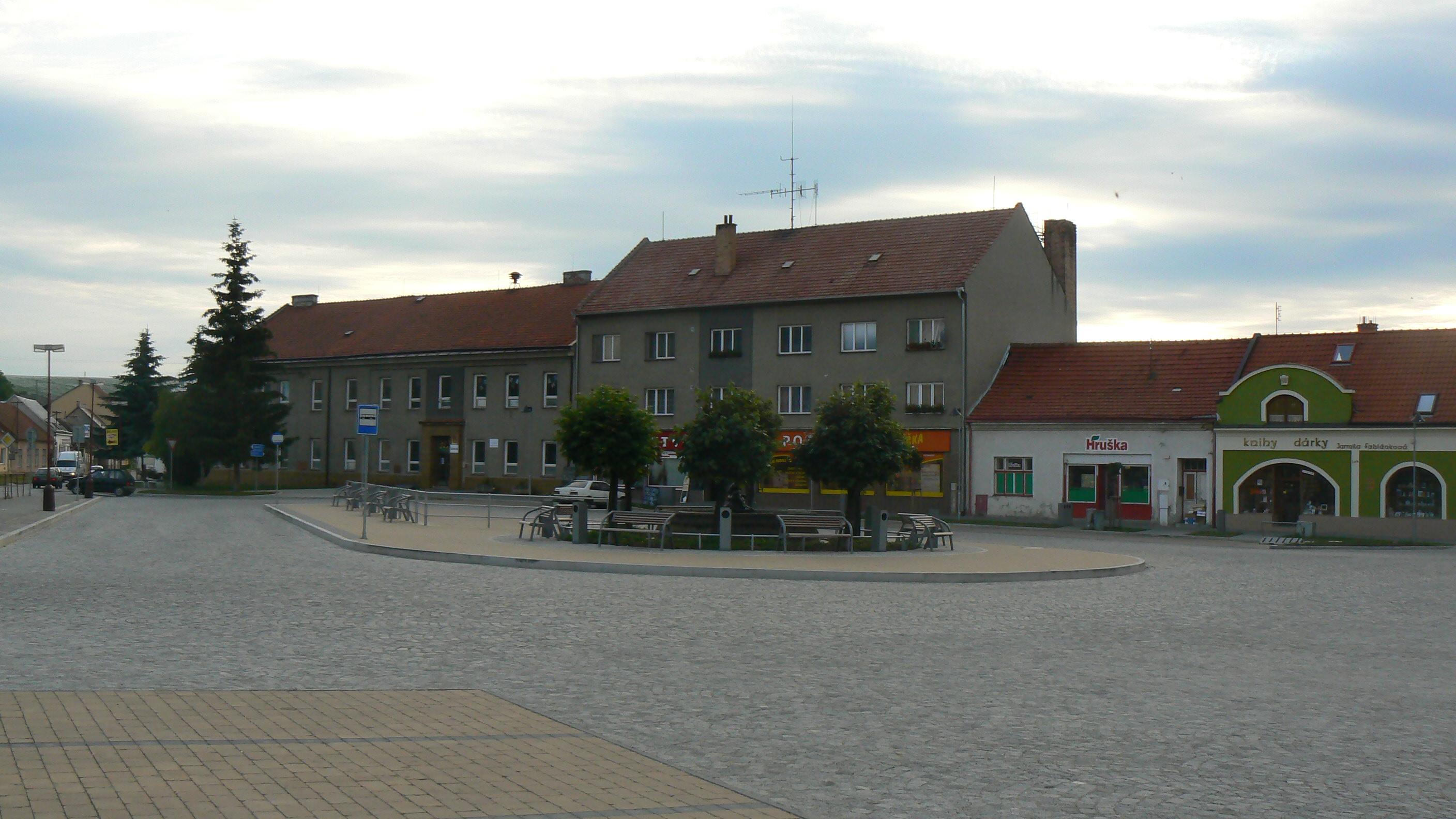
- Town square

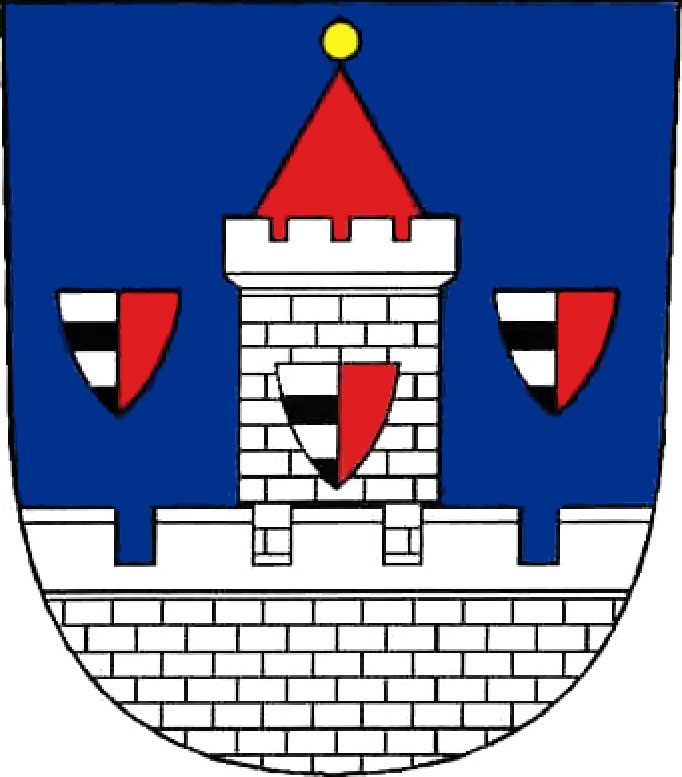
- Flag Coat of arms

- Location in the Czech Republic
- Coordinates: 49°6′23″N 17°9′52″E
- Country: Czech Republic
- Region: Zlín
- District: Kroměříž
- First mentioned: 1321

Government
  - Mayor: Hana Jamborová

Area
  - Total: 41.13 km^{2} (15.88 sq mi)
- Elevation: 280 m (920 ft)

Population (2026-01-01)
  - Total: 2,744
  - Density: 66.72/km^{2} (172.8/sq mi)
- Time zone: UTC+1 (CET)
  - Summer (DST): UTC+2 (CEST)
- Postal code: 768 05
- Website: www.korycany.cz

Koryčany (Czech pronunciation: [ˈkorɪtʃanɪ]; German: Koritschan) is a town in Kroměříž District in the Zlín Region of the Czech Republic. It has about 2,700 inhabitants. The town is located on the Kyjovka River, on the border between the Litenčice Hills and Chřiby range.

== Administrative division ==
Koryčany consists of four municipal parts (in brackets population according to the 2021 census):

- Koryčany (1,925)
- Blišice (206)
- Jestřabice (257)
- Lískovec (272)

== Geography ==
Koryčany is located about 26 kilometres (16 mi) southwest of Kroměříž and 40 km (25 mi) east of Brno. The eastern part of the municipal territory lies in the Litenčice Hills. The western part lies in a forested landscape of the Chřiby range and includes the highest point of Koryčany, the hill Ocásek at 553 m (1,814 ft) above sea level.

The Kyjovka River flows through the town. The Koryčany Reservoir was built on the river in 1953–1958 for supplying the region with drinking water and as flood protection.

== History ==
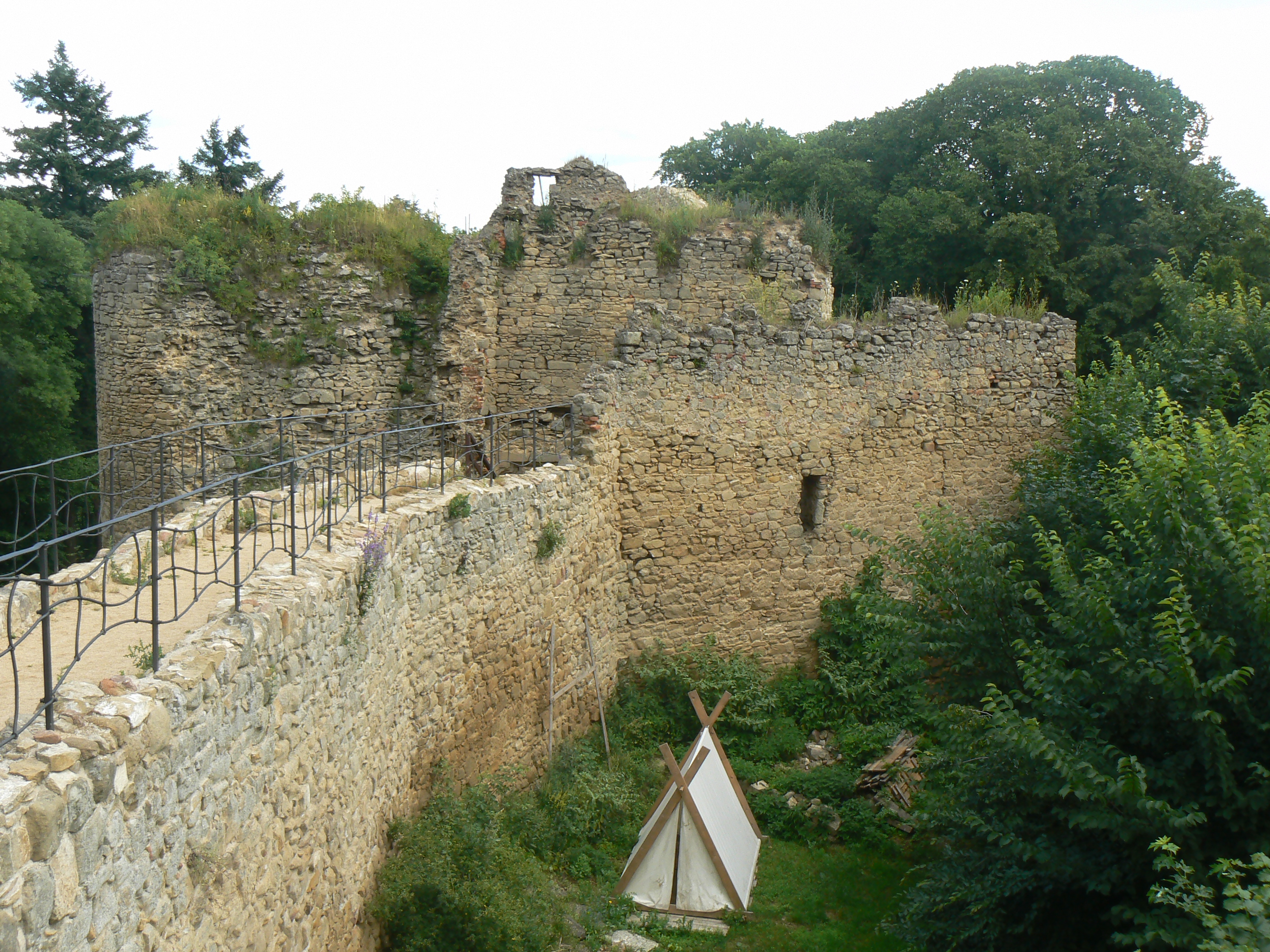
Cimburk Castle

The first written mention of Koryčany is from 1321. In 1349, Koryčany was first referred to as a market town. The Cimburk Castle was built here between 1327 and 1333 and became the centre of the estate. In the 17th century, the castle lost its importance, and was abandoned in 1720.

The Jewish population was first documented in 1567. The community was at its peak in the mid-19th century. The last four families disappeared as a result of the Holocaust.

In 1967, Koryčany was promoted to a town. The formerly separate municipalities of Jestřabice and Lískovec were joined to Koryčany in 1976.

== Demographics ==
Historical population

Year	Pop.	±%
1869	3,292	—
1880	3,950	+20.0%
1890	4,399	+11.4%
1900	4,234	−3.8%
1910	4,823	+13.9%

Year	Pop.	±%
1921	4,626	−4.1%
1930	4,482	−3.1%
1950	3,739	−16.6%
1961	3,954	+5.8%
1970	3,597	−9.0%

Year	Pop.	±%
1980	3,243	−9.8%
1991	2,950	−9.0%
2001	2,840	−3.7%
2011	2,837	−0.1%
2021	2,660	−6.2%

Source: Censuses

== Transport ==
There are no major roads passing through the municipality. The railway that starts here is unused.

== Sights ==
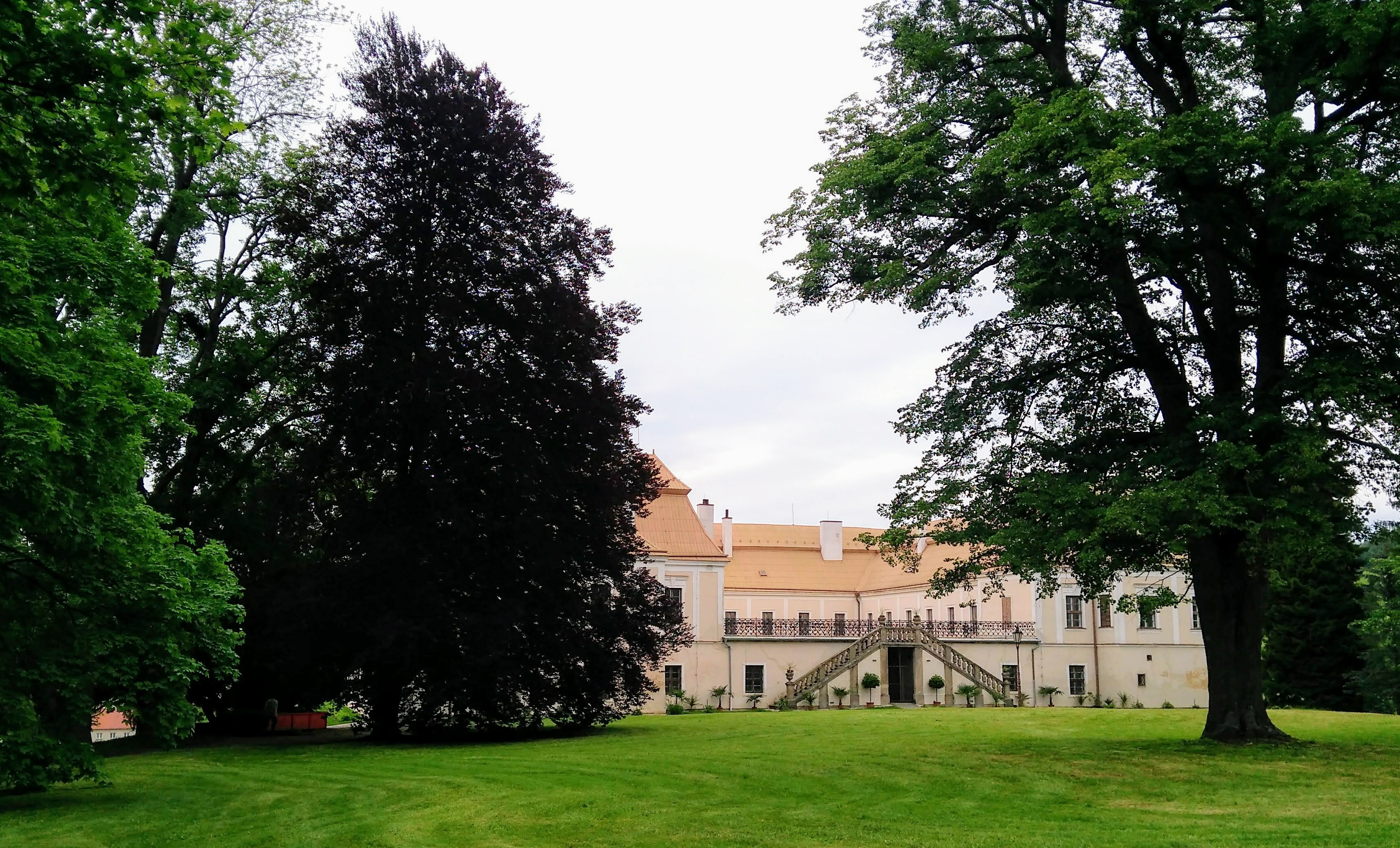
Koryčany Castle

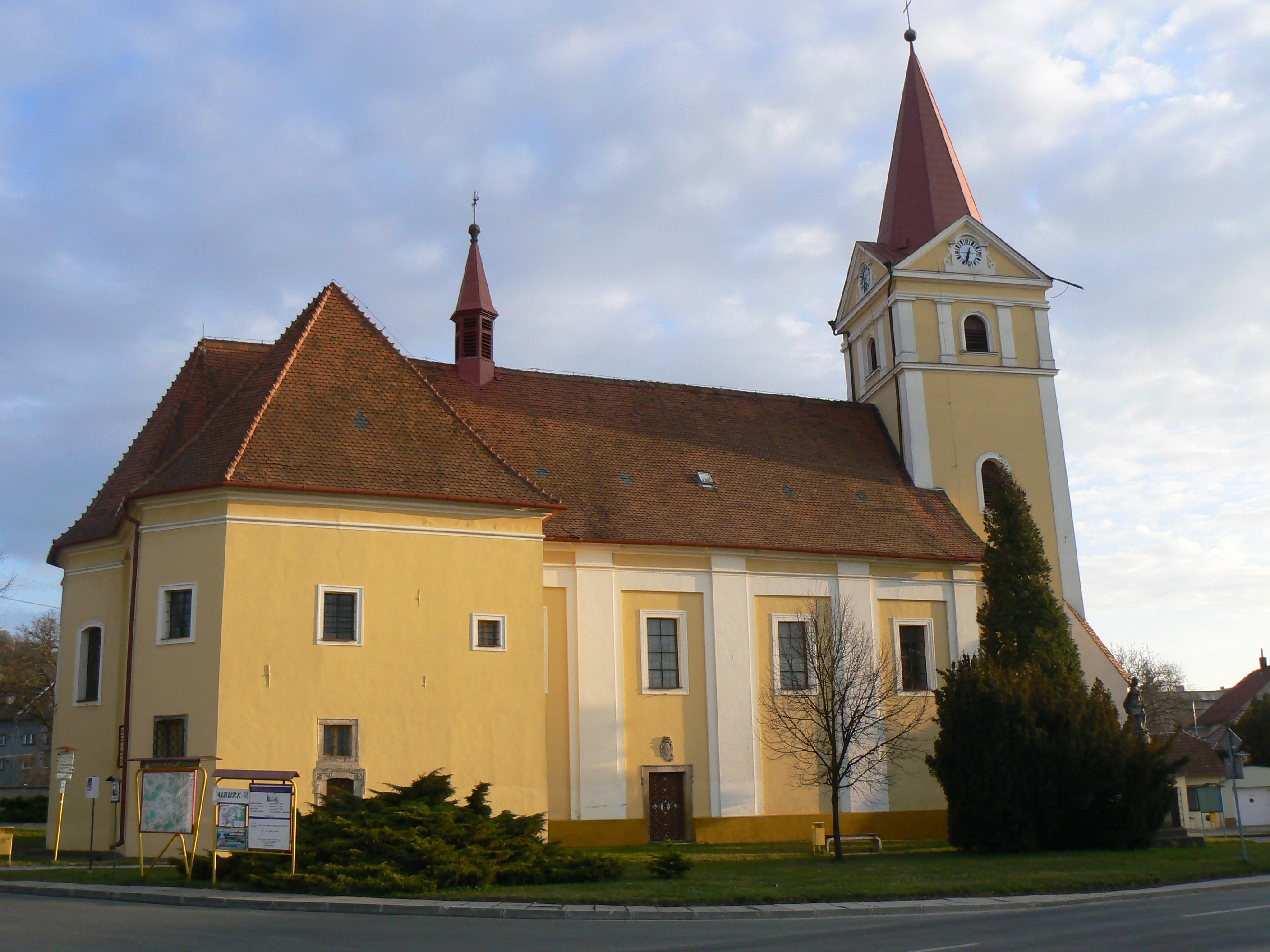
Church of Saint Lawrence

The Cimburk Castle is a ruin of a Gothic-Renaissance castle. Today it is gradually repaired and is open to the public.

The Koryčany Castle was first mentioned 1611 as a fortress and manor house. It was built to replace the remote Gothic castle as the seat of the lordship. The fortress was rebuilt to a Baroque castle in 1677. In the late 18th century, the castle was extended, and ornamental garden and English park were founded. Today the castle complex is privately owned.

The Church of Saint Lawrence was first mentioned in 1350. Its present appearance dates from the second half of the 17th century.

The Jewish cemetery has about 200 tombstones. The oldest preserved tombstone is from 1674.

== Notable people ==
- Ignaz Grossmann (1825–1897), rabbi; served here in 1863–1866
- Oskar Rosenfeld (1884–1944), Austrian-Jewish writer
- Rudolf Rafael Kolisch (1867–1922), Austrian medical doctor

== Twin towns – sister cities ==
Koryčany is twinned with:

- Lehota, Slovakia
