= Kyjov =

- Town
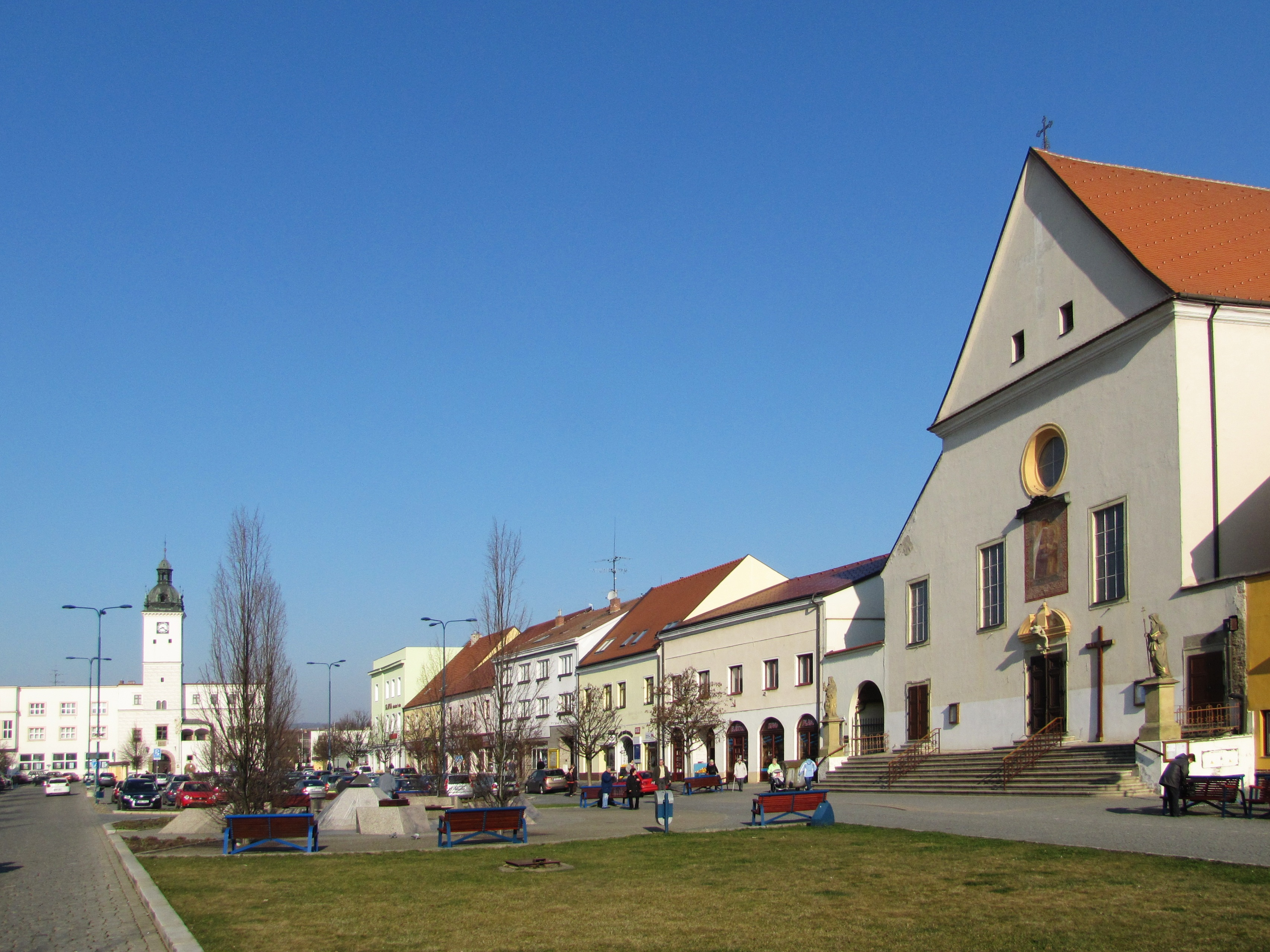
- The square Masarykovo náměstí

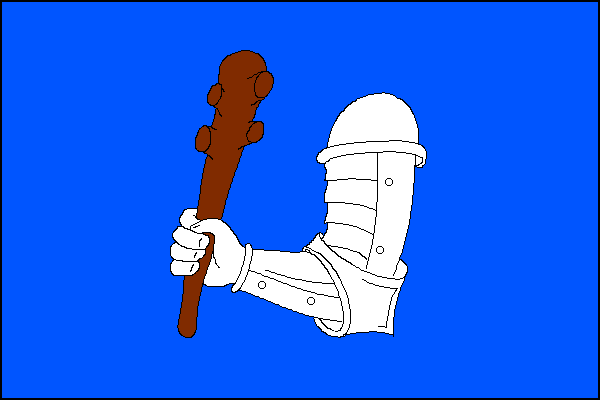
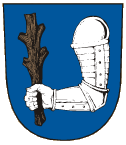
- Flag Coat of arms

- Location in the Czech Republic
- Coordinates: 49°0′37″N 17°7′21″E
- Country: Czech Republic
- Region: South Moravian
- District: Hodonín
- First mentioned: 1126

Government
  - Mayor: František Lukl

Area
  - Total: 29.88 km^{2} (11.54 sq mi)
- Elevation: 192 m (630 ft)

Population (2026-01-01)
  - Total: 10,537
  - Density: 352.6/km^{2} (913.3/sq mi)
- Time zone: UTC+1 (CET)
  - Summer (DST): UTC+2 (CEST)
- Postal code: 697 01
- Website: www.mestokyjov.cz

Kyjov (Czech pronunciation: [ˈkɪjof]; German: Gaya or Geyen) is a town in Hodonín District in the South Moravian Region of the Czech Republic. It has about 11,000 inhabitants. The town is located in the valley of the Kyjovka River.

Kyjov became a town in the 16th century, when it was purchased by the royal chamber and the period of its greatest development began. The historic town centre is well preserved and is protected as an urban monument zone. The main landmark of the town centre is the Renaissance town hall, which is a national cultural monument.

== Administrative division ==
Kyjov consists of four municipal parts (in brackets population according to the 2021 census):

- Kyjov (7,904)
- Bohuslavice (645)
- Boršov (716)
- Nětčice (1,737)

== Geography ==
Kyjov is located about 17 kilometres (11 mi) north of Hodonín. Most of the municipal territory lies in the Kyjov Hills, only a small northern part lies in the Chřiby highlands. The highest point is the hill Lenivá hora at 463 m (1,519 ft) above sea level. The town is situated in the valley of the Kyjovka River.

== History ==
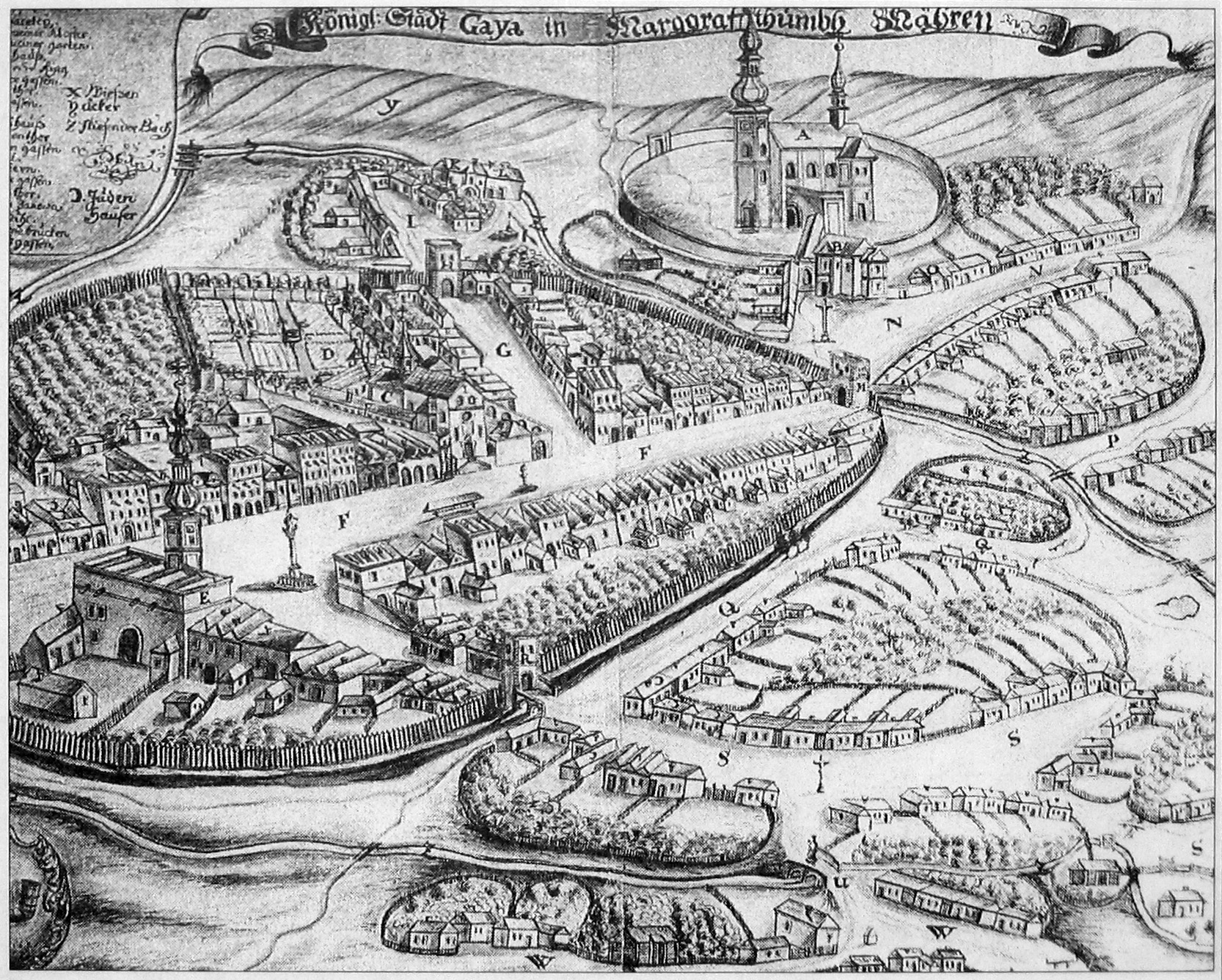
Kyjov in 1727

The first written mention of Kyjov is from 1126. Until 1539, it was a property of the Hradisko Monastery. In the 12th century, a Romanesque church and new market place were established here. In 1201, Kyjov was first referred to as a market town. In 1284, King Wenceslaus II allowed to fortify the market town. Kyjov had no funds for the stone walls and built only wooden palisades.

Due to financial difficulties of the monastery, in the 14th and 15th centuries, Kyjov was pawned to various lower nobles. In 1515, Kyjov became a town. The monastery sold the town in 1539. After it changed its owners few times, in 1548, Kyjov became a royal town, received a royal promise not to be sold or pawned again, and gained an advantageous position that led to further development. The town repaired buildings, built three town gates and new Renaissance town hall, and acquired new properties.

In 1710, the first Capuchins came to Kyjov. They had a new church built. In 1784, the Capuchin monastery was abolished. From 1784 to 1848, the town was in good economic condition and expanded. In the second half of the 19th century, Kyjov had a German speaking minory, which included Jewish population.

Until 1918, Kyjov was part of Austria-Hungary, head of the district with the same name, one of the 34 Bezirkshauptmannschaften in Moravia.

== Demographics ==
As of 31 December 2025, with an average age of 47.2 years, the town has one of the oldest populations in the country, and the oldest among the cities and towns with a population of over 10,000.

Historical population

Year	Pop.	±%
1869	5,185	—
1880	5,564	+7.3%
1890	6,079	+9.3%
1900	6,819	+12.2%
1910	7,397	+8.5%

Year	Pop.	±%
1921	7,265	−1.8%
1930	7,299	+0.5%
1950	7,644	+4.7%
1961	9,081	+18.8%
1970	10,792	+18.8%

Year	Pop.	±%
1980	12,632	+17.0%
1991	12,920	+2.3%
2001	12,413	−3.9%
2011	11,462	−7.7%
2021	11,002	−4.0%

Source: Censuses

== Transport ==
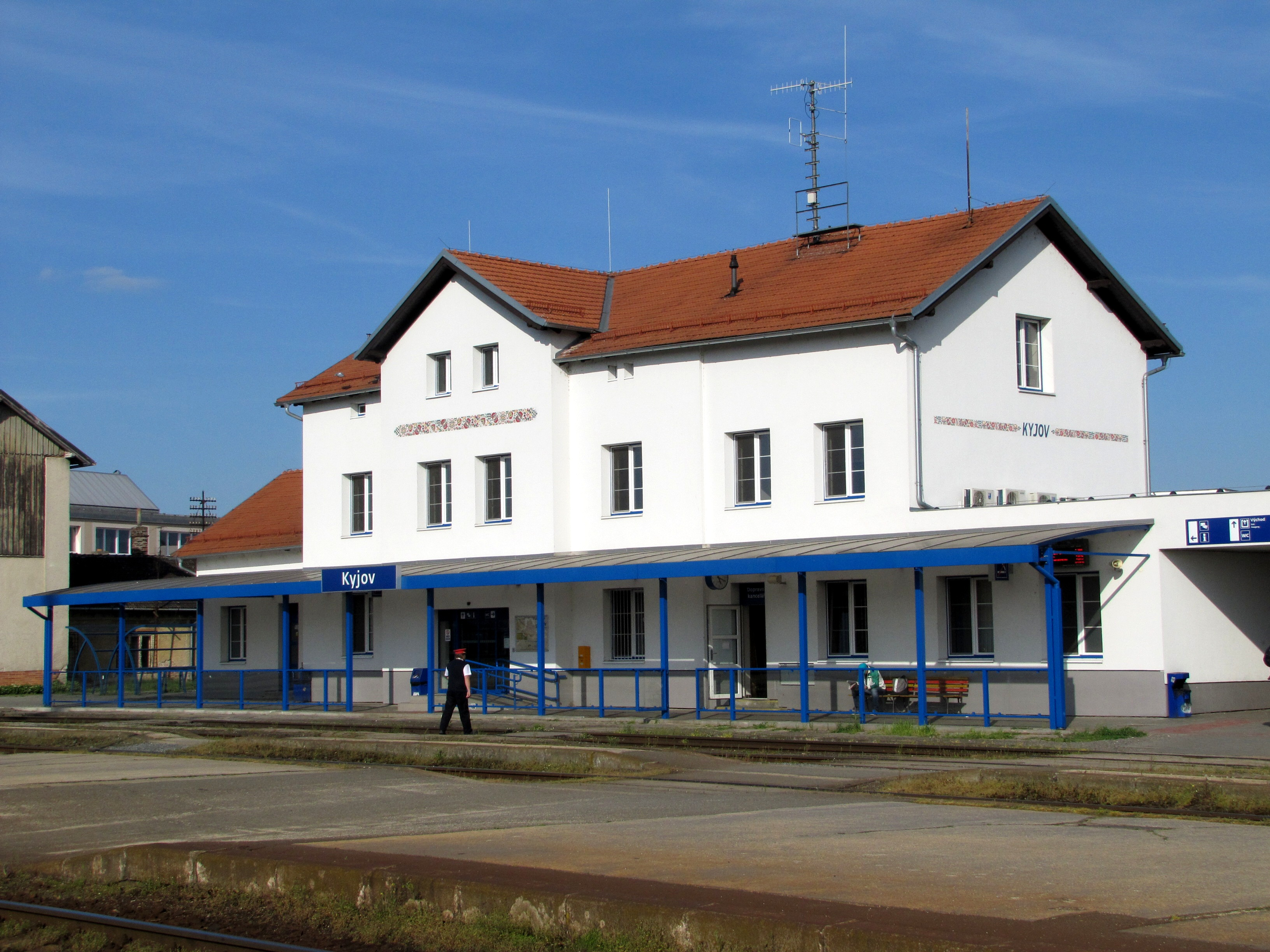
Kyjov train station

Kyjov is located on the railway line from Brno to Uherské Hradiště. It is served by three train stations and stops: Kyjov, Kyjov zastávka and Bohuslavice u Kyjova.

== Culture ==
Kyjov is a centre of regional folklore. The town lies in the cultural region of Moravian Slovakia. The festival Slovácký rok ('Moravian Slovak Year') is the oldest Moravian folklore festival. It has taken place here since 1921 every four years.

Kyjov participated and won silver in the 2008 Entente Florale Europe, which is an international horticultural competition.

== Sights ==
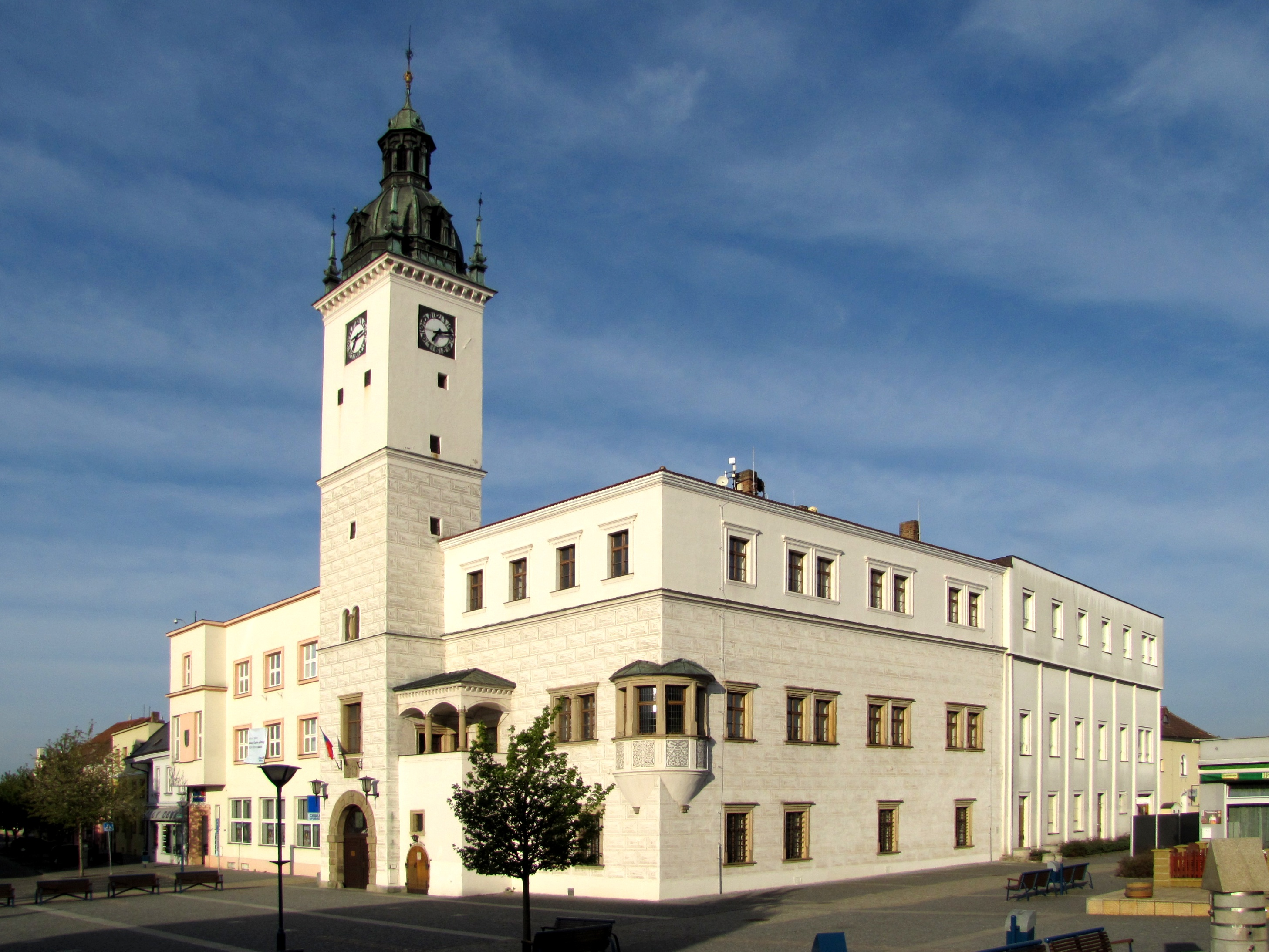
Town hall

The historic centre is formed by the square Masarykovo náměstí and the nearest surroundings. In the middle of the square is a Marian column from the 1720s. The square is dominated by the Renaissance town hall. Built by Italian architects in 1561–1562, it is decorated with sgraffiti and has a 39 metres (128 ft)-high tower. Since 2024, it has been protected as a national cultural monument.

The Church of the Assumption of the Virgin Mary is also located on the town square. It was built in 1713–1720 and extended in 1734. Under the church is a Capuchin tomb with 40 coffins.

The Chateau is the oldest preserved building in the town. It was built in the first half of the 16th century as a manor house and gradually served various purposes. In 1911, it was reconstructed and decorated by sgraffito. Since 1928, it houses the Kyjov Ethnographic Museum with archaeological, ethnographic and natural science expositions.

== Notable people ==
- Ervin Rössler (1876–1933), Croatian zoologist
- Hugo Sonnenschein (1889–1953), Austrian writer
- Radola Gajda (1892–1948), military commander and politician; studied here
- Bohumil Sekla (1901–1987), biologist and university professor
- Miroslav Novák (1907–2000), theologian and patriarch
- Miroslav Tichý (1926–2011), painter and photographer
- Ivo Knoflíček (born 1962), footballer
- Roman Stantien (born 1964), Slovak ice hockey player
- Silvia Saint (born 1976), porn actress
- Jan Bárta (born 1984), road cyclist
- Jakub Kornfeil (born 1993), motorcycle racer

== Twin towns – sister cities ==
Kyjov is twinned with:

- Biograd na Moru, Croatia
- Hollabrunn, Austria
- Lutsk, Ukraine
- Pezinok, Slovakia
- Prizren, Kosovo
- Seravezza, Italy
- Yvetot, France
