= Stupava, Czech Republic =

Stupava
- Municipality
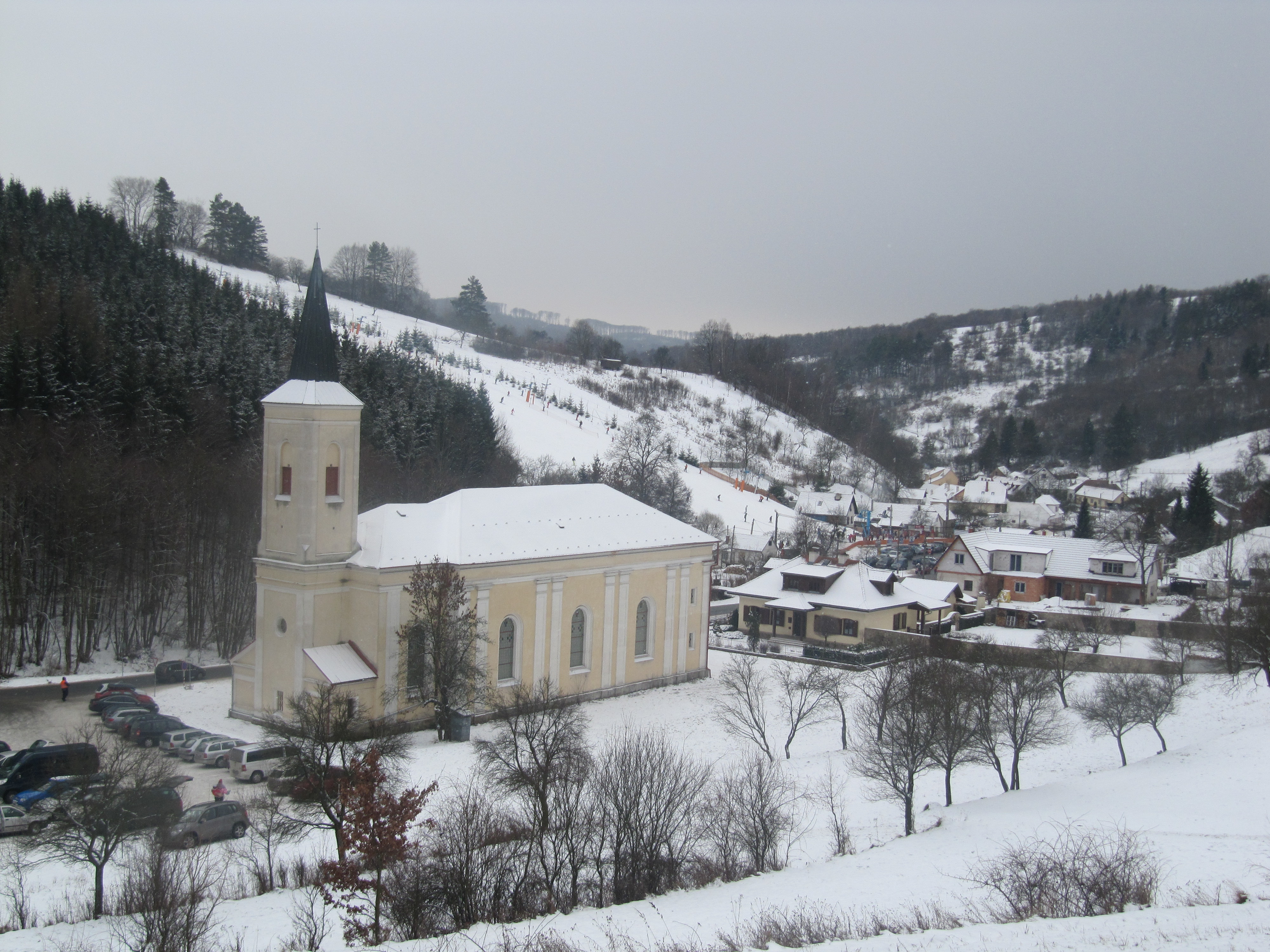
- Church of Saint Clement

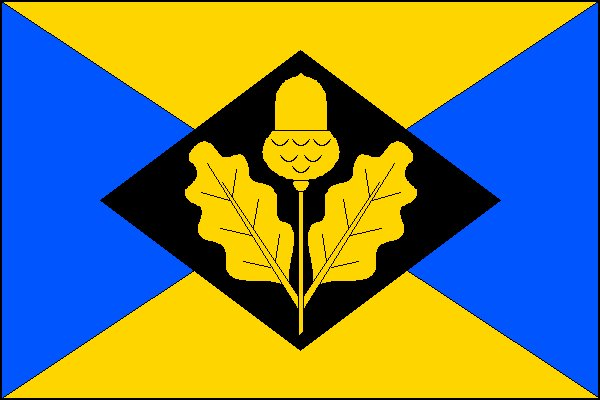
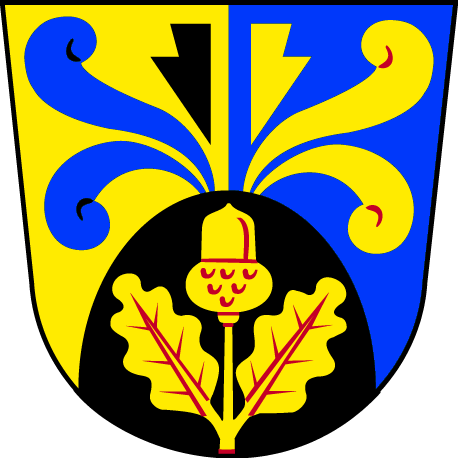
- Flag Coat of arms

- Location in the Czech Republic
- Coordinates: 49°7′2″N 17°14′55″E
- Country: Czech Republic
- Region: Zlín
- District: Uherské Hradiště
- First mentioned: 1690

Area
  - Total: 7.11 km^{2} (2.75 sq mi)
- Elevation: 345 m (1,132 ft)

Population (2026-01-01)
  - Total: 162
  - Density: 22.8/km^{2} (59.0/sq mi)
- Time zone: UTC+1 (CET)
  - Summer (DST): UTC+2 (CEST)
- Postal code: 686 01
- Website: www.obec-stupava.cz

Stupava is a municipality and village in Uherské Hradiště District in the Zlín Region of the Czech Republic. It has about 200 inhabitants.

Stupava lies approximately 16 kilometres (10 mi) west of Uherské Hradiště, 33 km (21 mi) south-west of Zlín, and 231 km (144 mi) south-east of Prague.

== Demographics ==
Historical population
Year	Pop.	±%
1869	768	—
1880	856	+11.5%
1890	755	−11.8%
1900	718	−4.9%
1910	680	−5.3%
1921	672	−1.2%
1930	581	−13.5%
1950	470	−19.1%
1961	532	+13.2%
1970	474	−10.9%
1980	352	−25.7%
1991	213	−39.5%
2001	157	−26.3%
2011	152	−3.2%
2021	151	−0.7%
Source: Censuses
