= Churches of Brno =

The majority of church buildings in Brno belong to the Roman Catholic Church, others mainly to Protestant churches. In addition, there are a synagogue and a mosque. To describe the more notable ones, we can divide Brno into three areas: the city centre (inside the former walls), the early suburbs (from the 1850s until after World War I), and former villages and large housing estates incorporated after World War I, including post-World War II developments.

== City centre ==
=== Catholic ===
- Cathedral of Sts. Peter and Paul

– Petrov Hill; Gothic church rebuilt in the Baroque style during the 18th century, later partially reconstructed in the Neo-Gothic style; two characteristic towers (81 m high) dating from 1905; cathedral since 1777

- St. Michael's Church

– Dominikánské Square; a Baroque church from the 17th century, until the Edict on Idle Institutions in the 1780s, a church of the Dominican Order; later (1905 to 1950) used by the Redemptorists; some of the former monastery buildings serve as the New Town Hall (Nová radnice) of Brno.

- Church of the Holy Cross

– church of the Order of Friars Minor Capuchin, a Baroque building from the 17th century; the crypt under the church is a unique air-circulation system providing natural mummification of buried bodies.

- St. Mary Magdalene's Church

– a Baroque church from the 1650s, built for the Franciscans on the site of an older church that originated from a synagogue closed after expulsion of the Jews in the 15th century; the Franciscans resided here until the Edict on Idle Institutions; later the church (and adjacent monastery) belonged to the Congregation of the Blessed Sacrament (1912-1950); since 1991 it has been administered by the Congregatio Fratrum Sanctissimi Sacramenti.

- St. Joseph's Church

– former Ursuline church, nowadays closed.

- St. Johns' Church with the Loreto Chapel

– Church of Sts. John the Baptist and John the Evangelist, since the Middle Ages a part of the Franciscan monastery; the originally Gothic church was renovated in the Baroque style during the 1720s-1730s, when the Loreto Chapel with the Holy Stairs was built next to the church.

- Church of the Assumption

– a Baroque church of the Jesuits, the only remnants of a Jesuit College from the 16th/17th centuries, interior partly from the 18th century.

- Church of St. James the Great

– originally the parish church of the non-Slavonic inhabitants of Brno, built from 14th to 16th centuries predominantly in the Gothic style; the spire (from 1592) is 92m high (the 7th highest building in the Czech Republic and the tallest in Brno).

- St. Thomas's Church

– a Baroque church with a monumental facade from 1665 to 1675 on the spot of the Gothic one damaged in the Thirty Years' War; since 1350 a part of an Augustinian monastery, planned as a burial place of Moravian rulers (Margrave Jobst is buried there); in the 1780s the Augustinians moved to Staré Brno.

=== Protestant and Orthodox ===
- Bethlehem Church

– built in the 19th century for Czech-speaking Protestants

- Comenius Church

– built in the 1860s in Neo-Gothic style for especially German-speaking Protestants (till the expulsion of Germans from Czechoslovakia after World War II)

- St. Wenceslaus (Orthodox) Church

– built in 1930–1931 at the foot of Špilberk Hill

=== Gallery ===
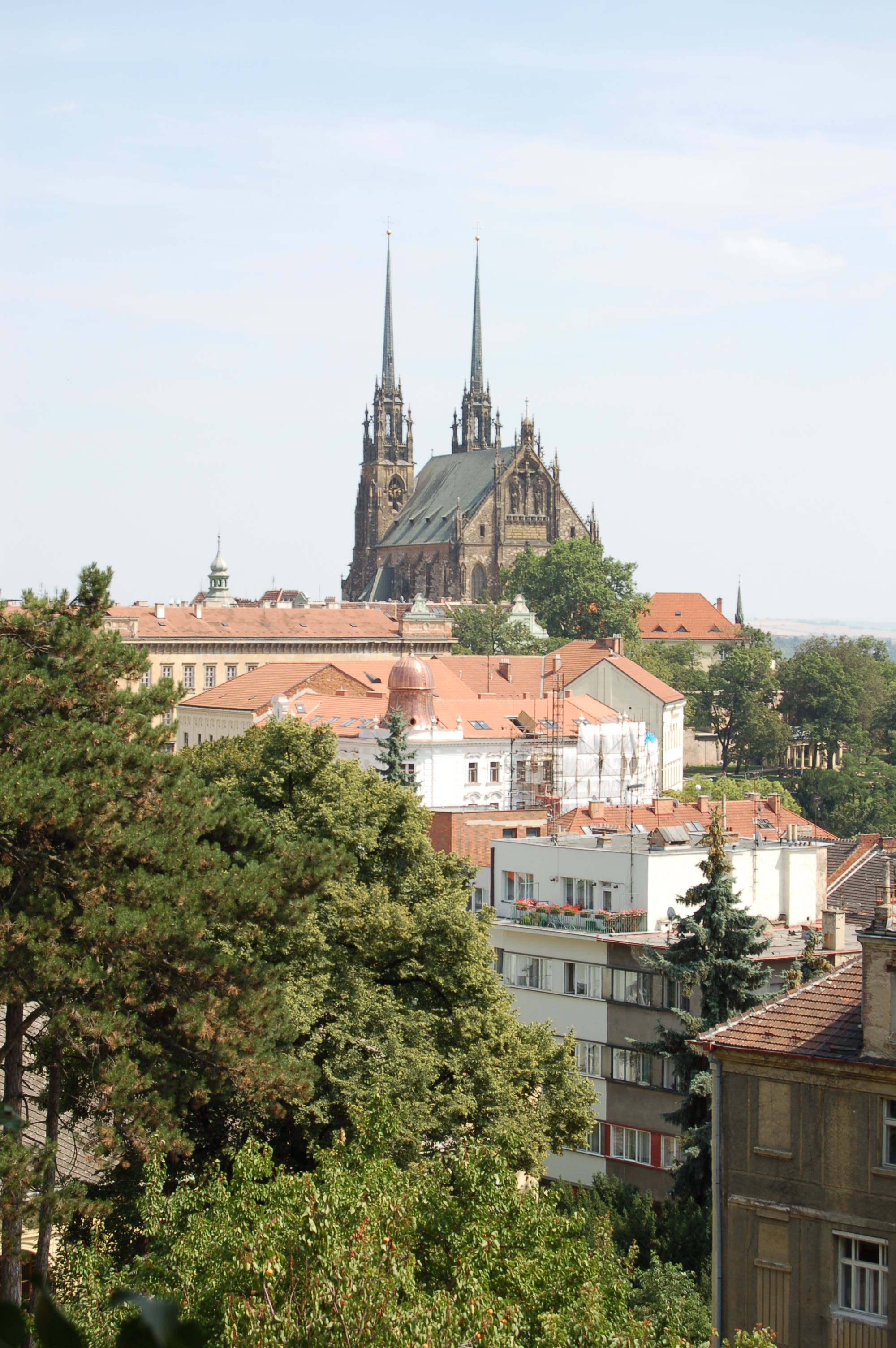
Cathedral of Sts. Peter and Paul

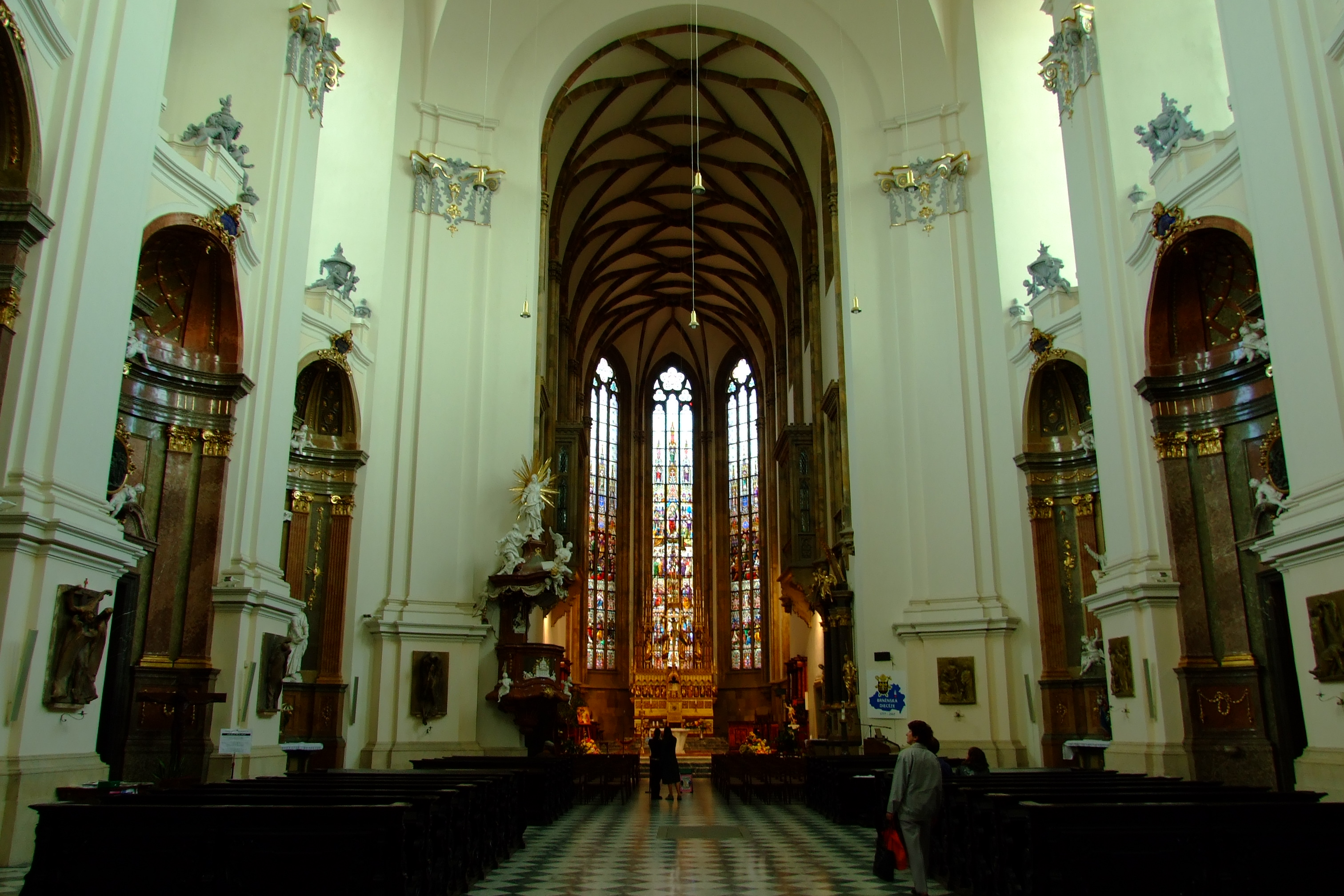
Cathedral of Sts. Peter and Paul - interior

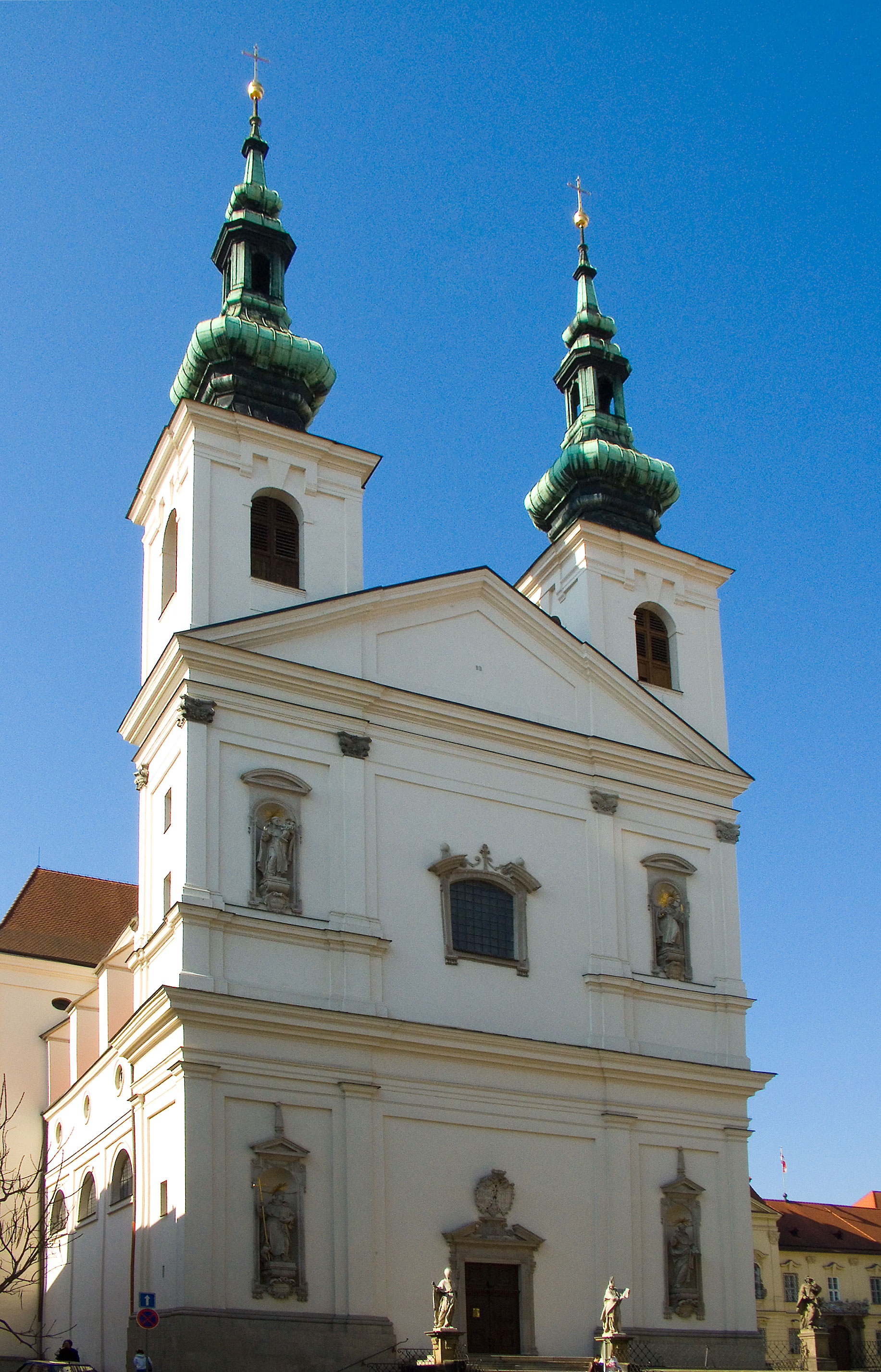
St. Michael's Church

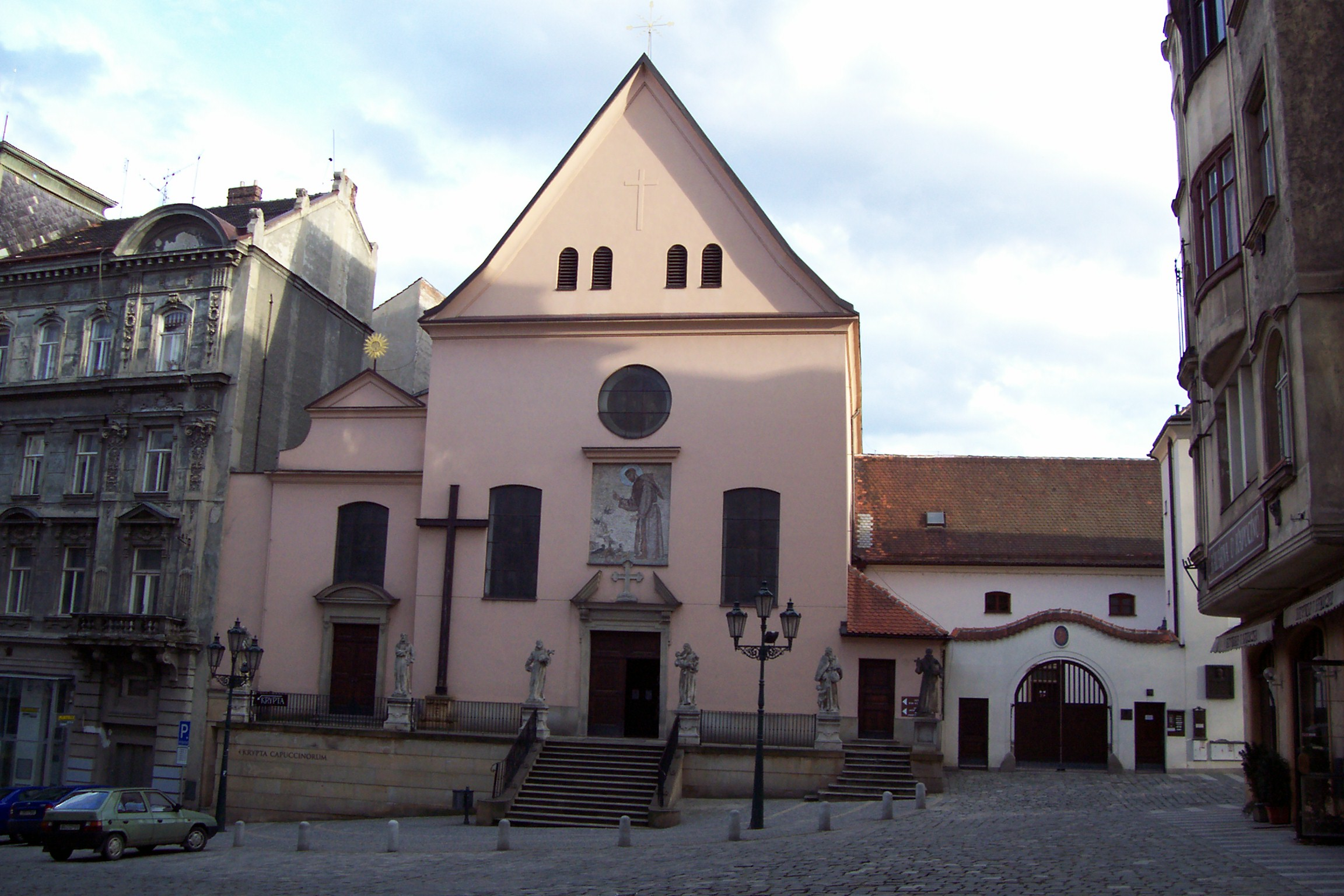
Capuchin Church

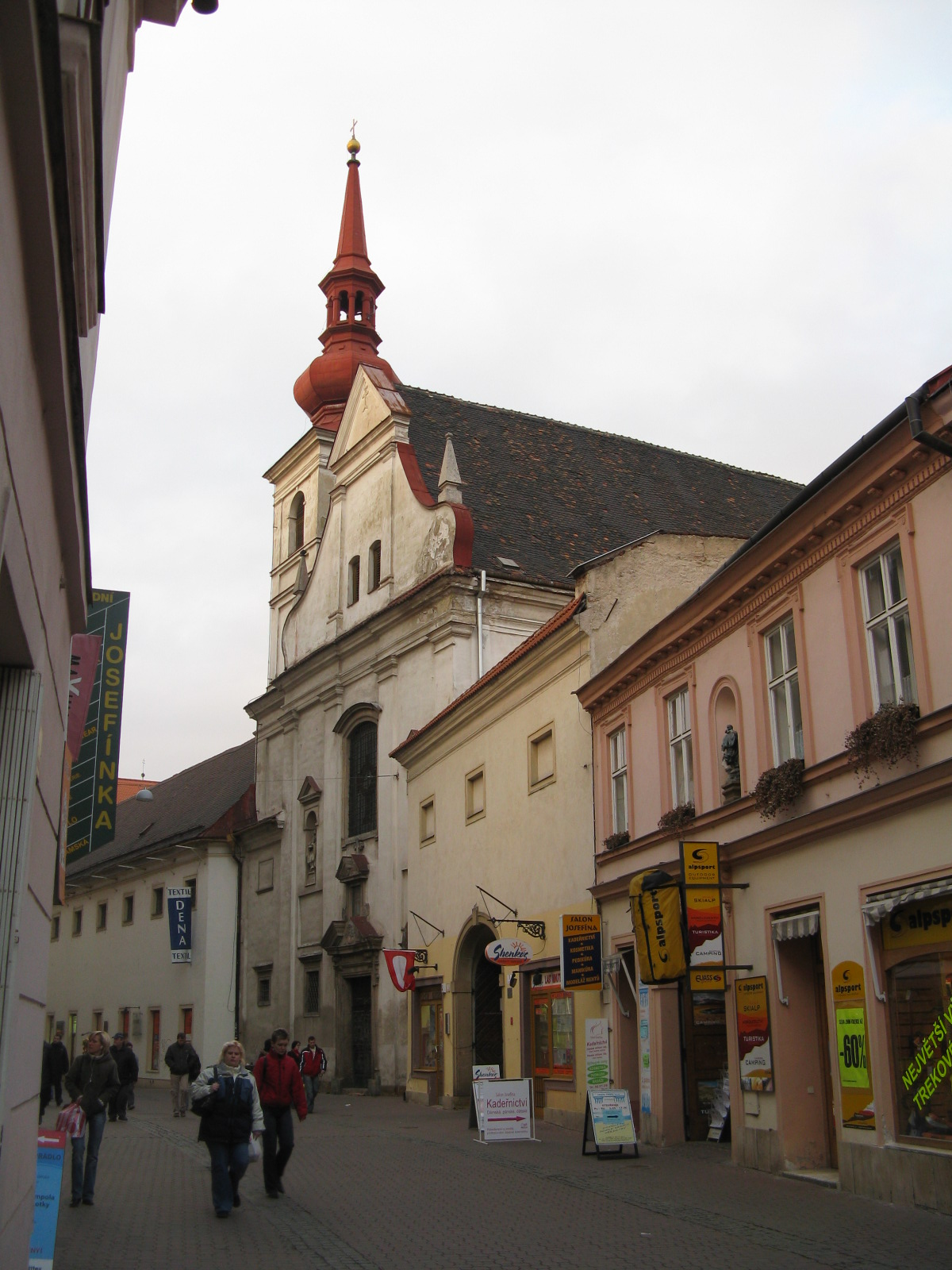
St. Joseph's Church

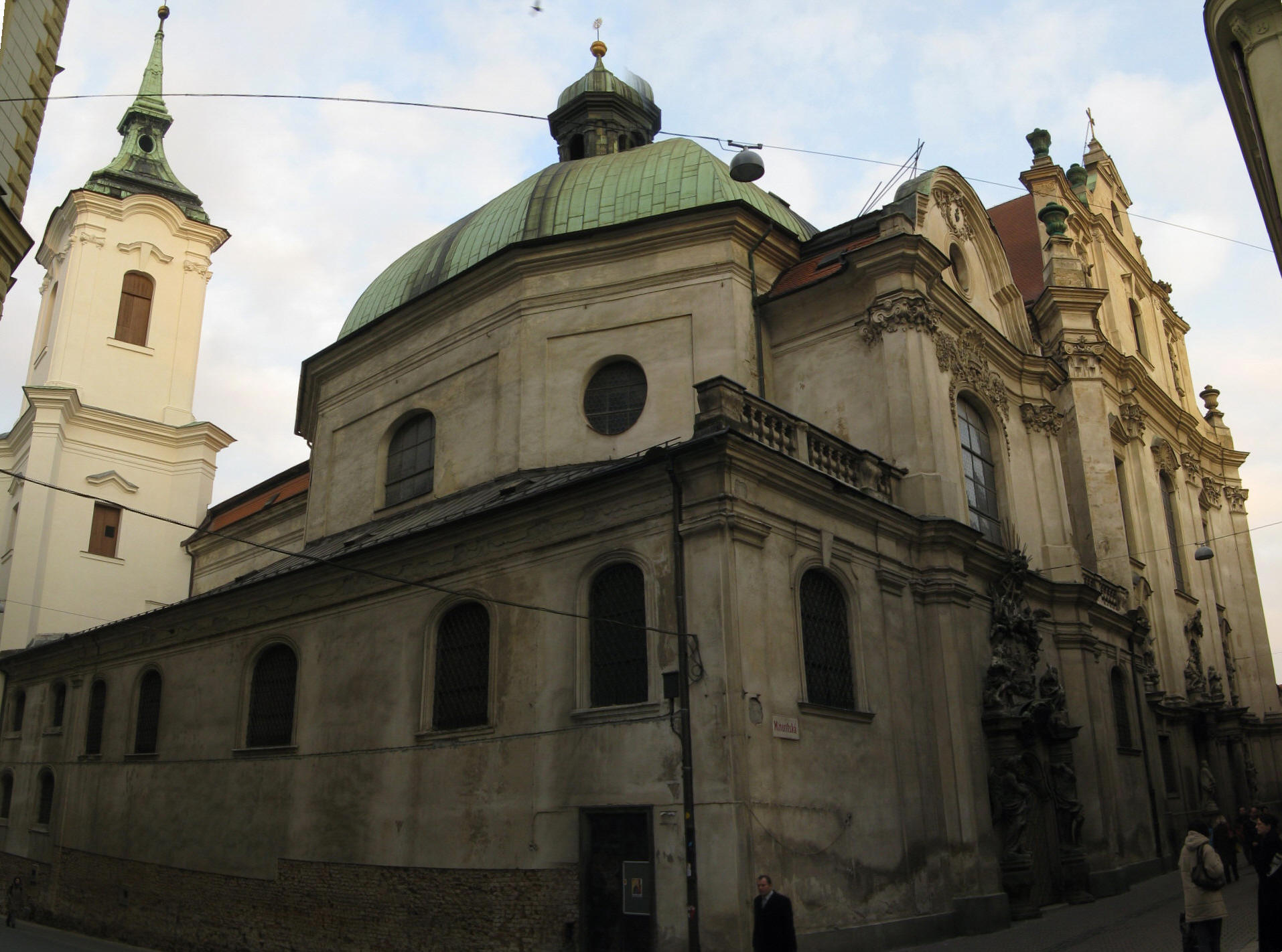
Minorite Church and Loreto Chapel (with cupola)

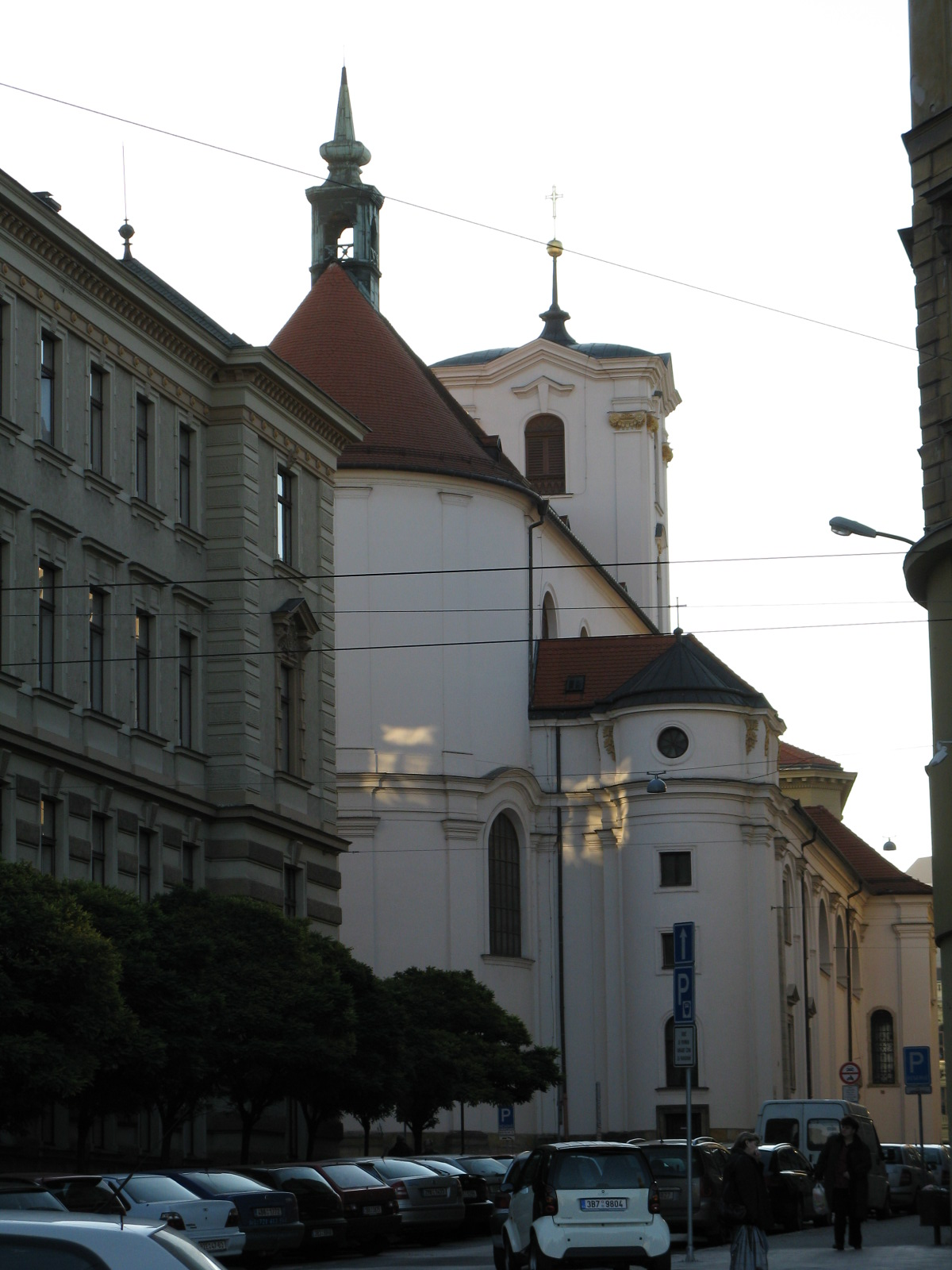
Jesuit Church

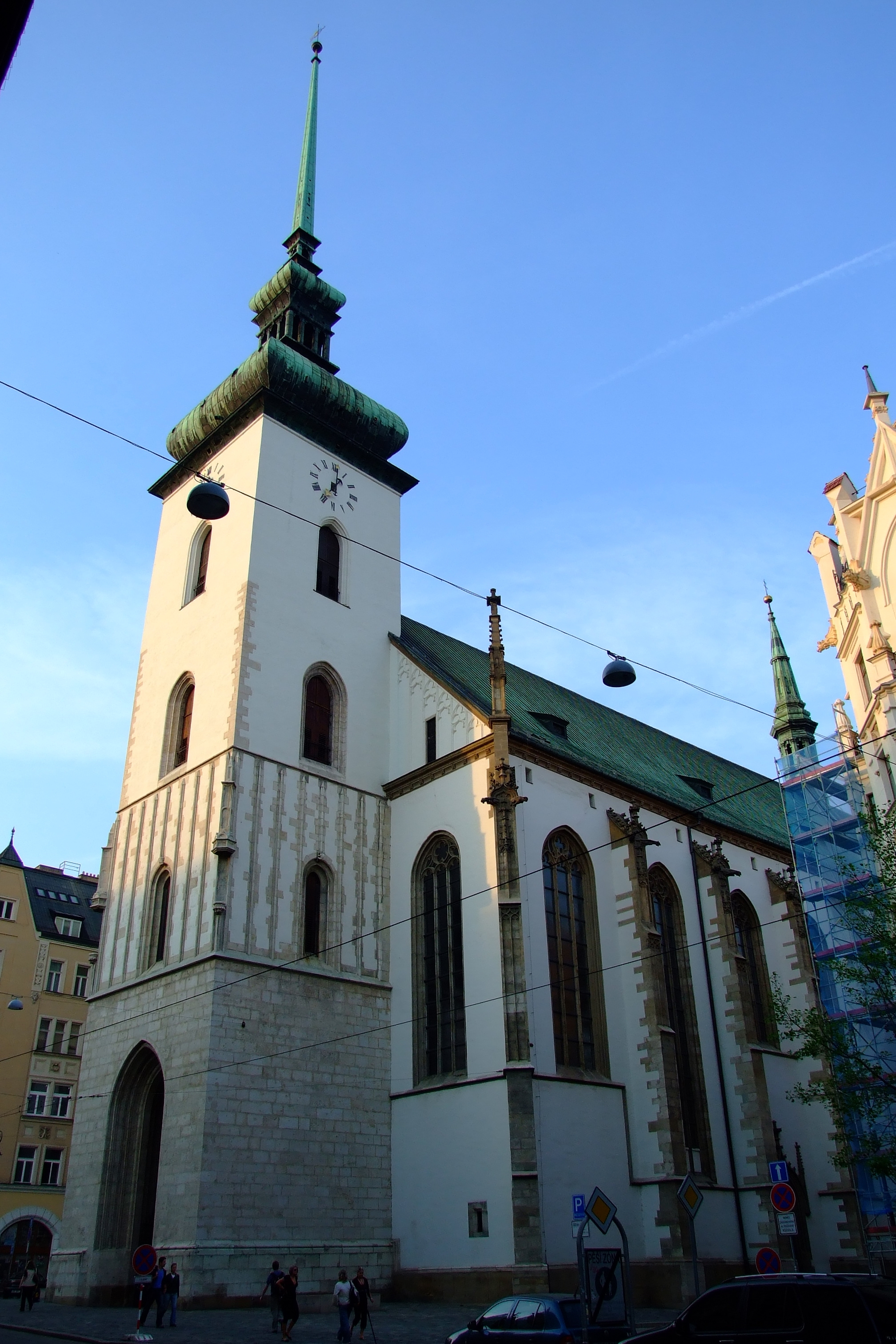
Church of St. James the Great

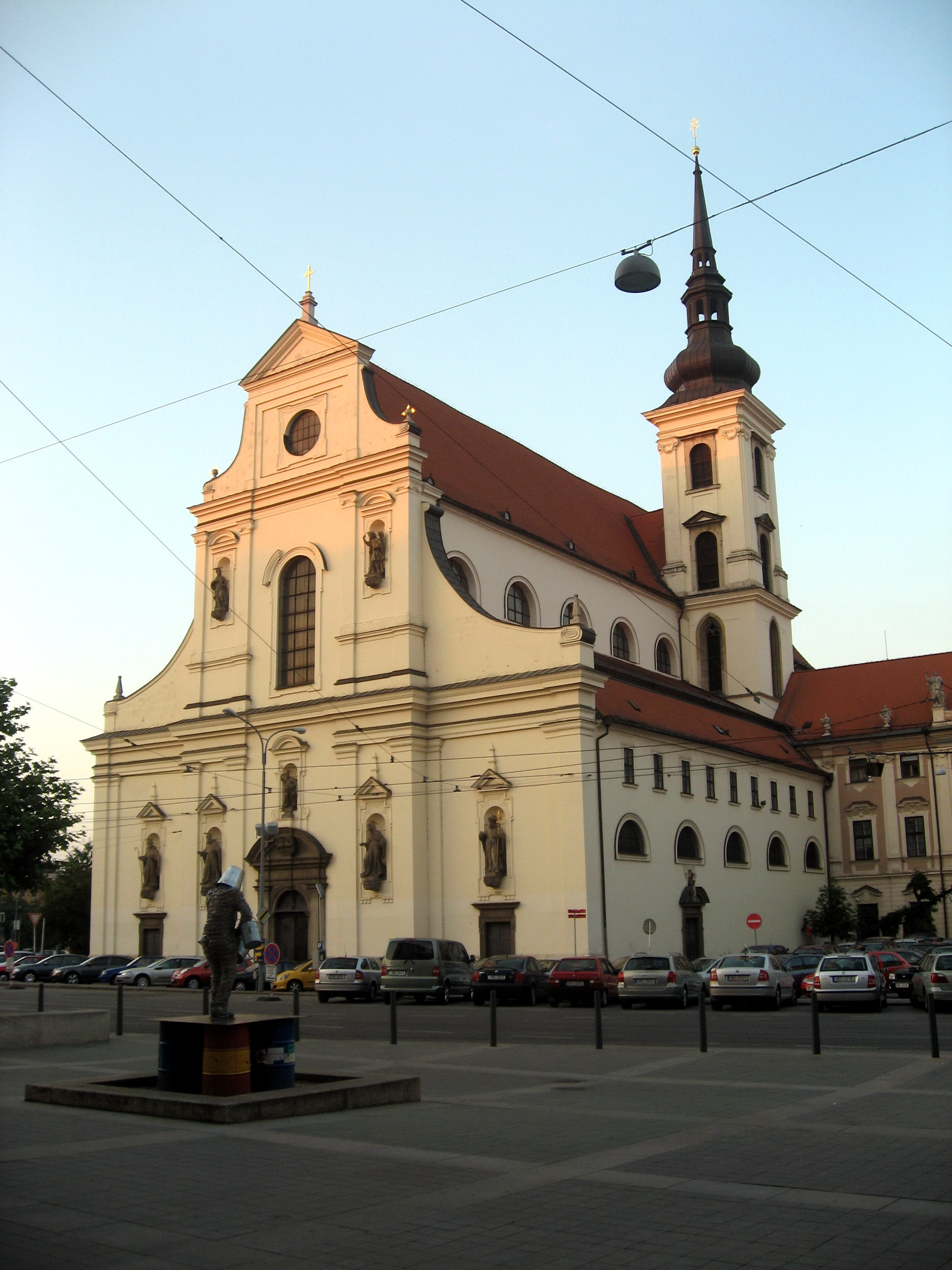
St. Thomas's Church

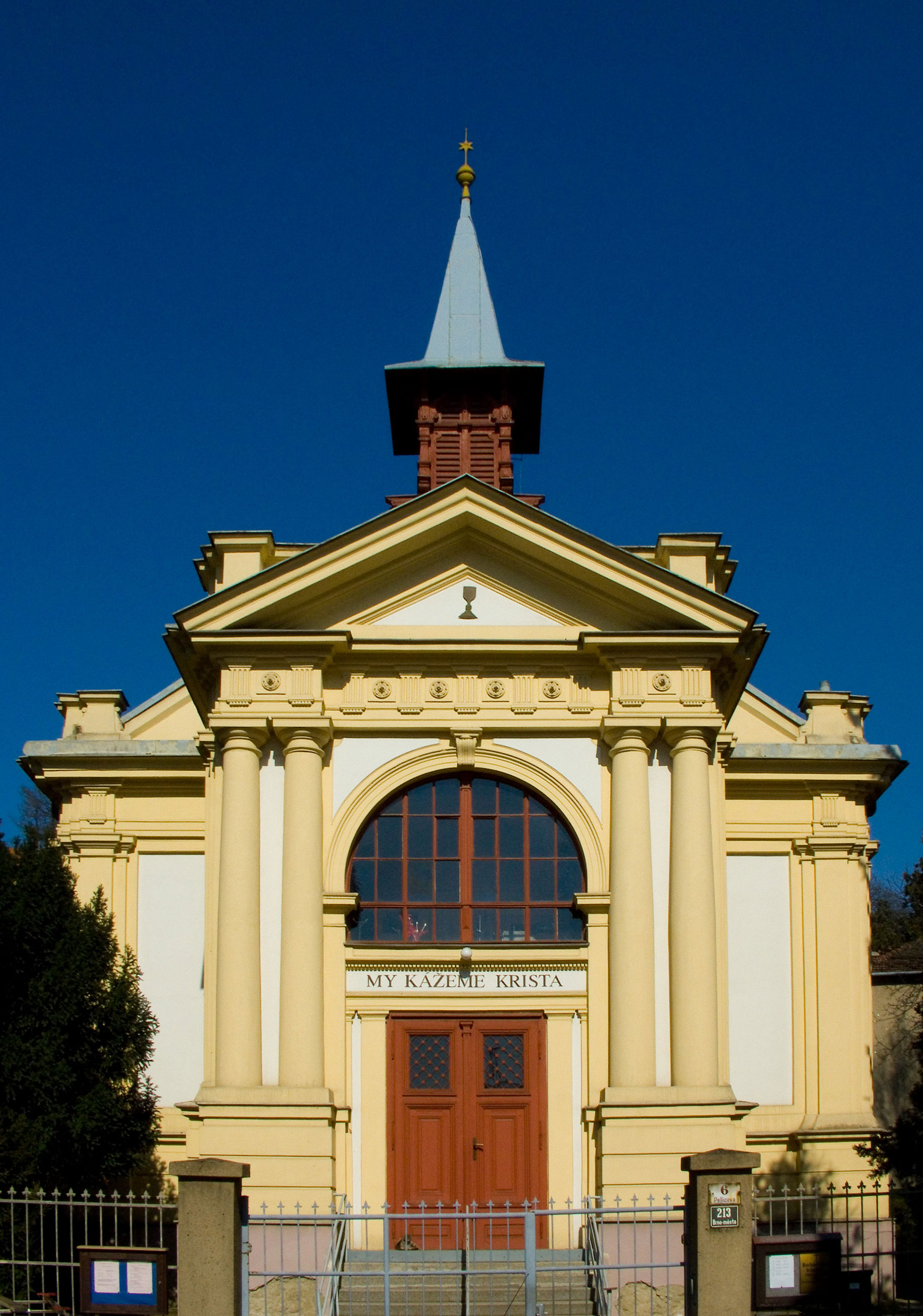
Bethlehem Church

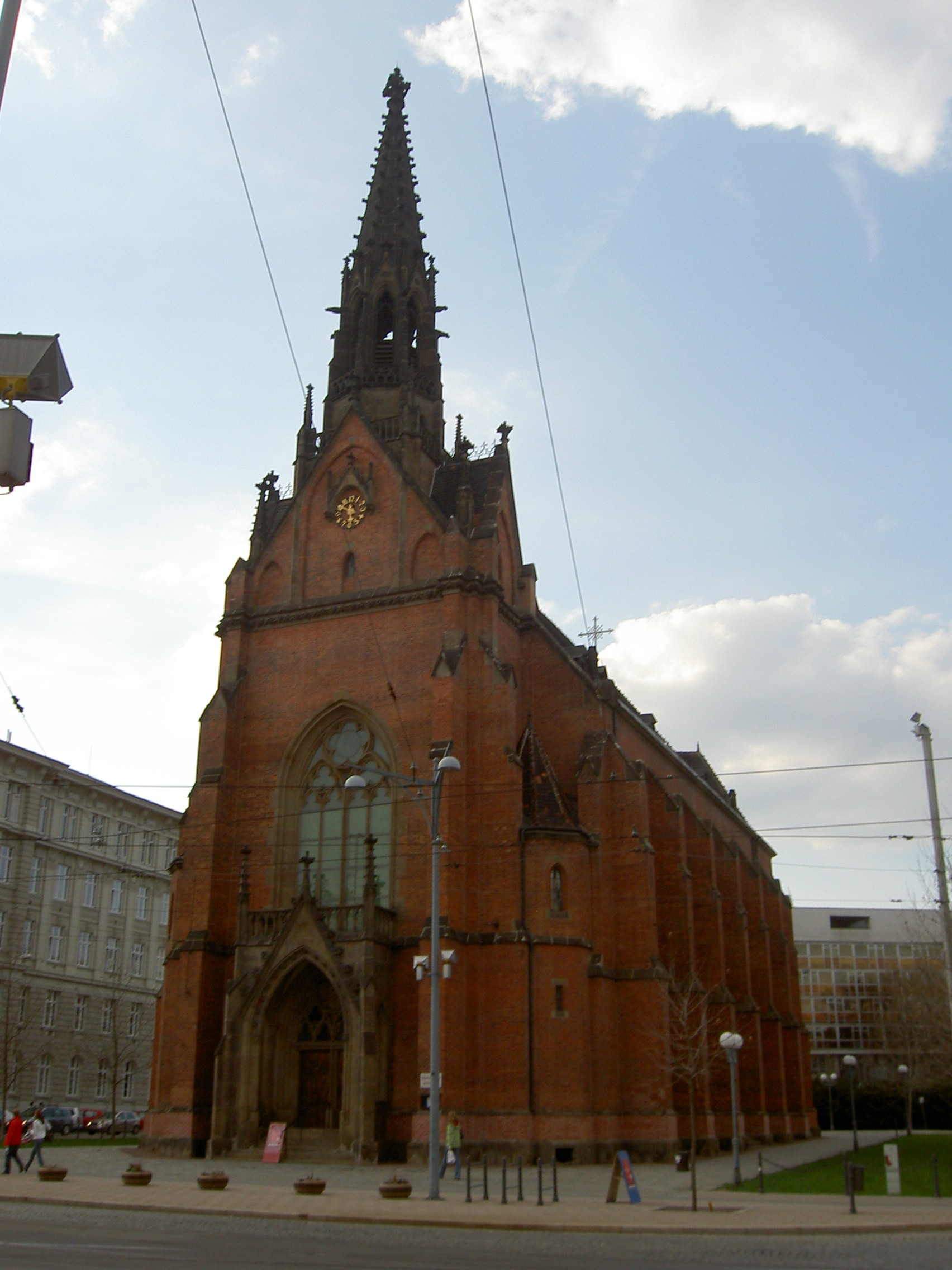
Comenius Church

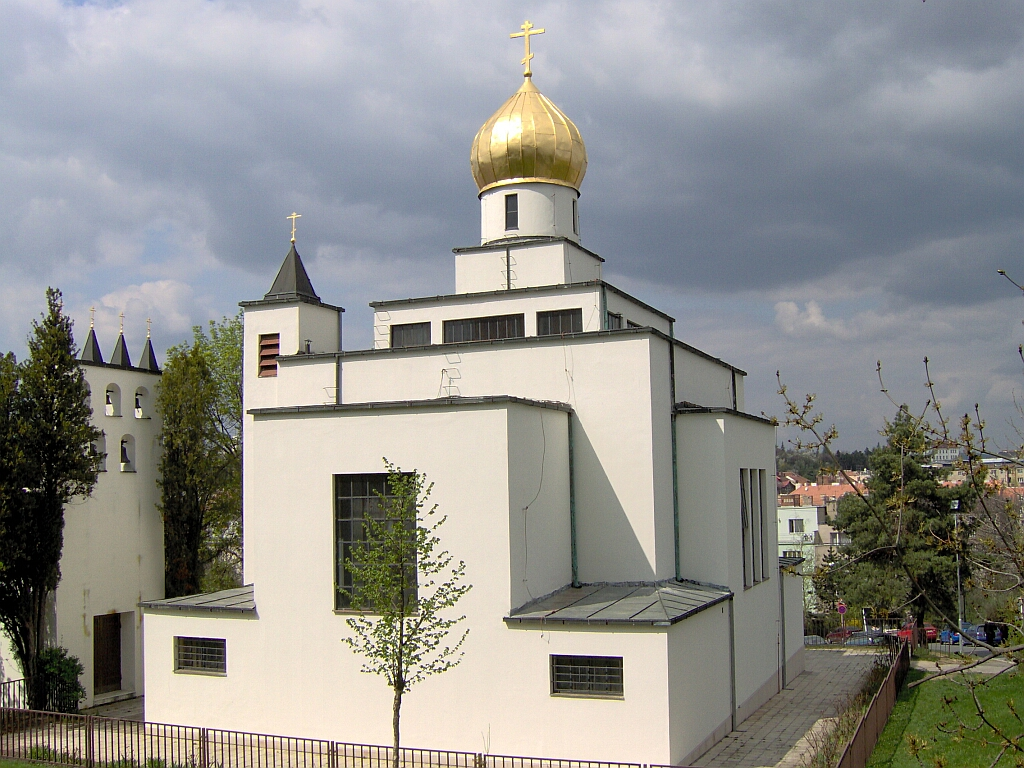
St. Wenceslaus Orthodox Church

== Former suburbs ==
=== Catholic ===
- Staré Brno (Augustinian Abbey)

– originally a Cistercian Convent, from the 1780s a monastery of Augustinians transferred from St. Thomas Church in the city centre; famous for its association with Gregor Mendel, who served as its abbot from 1868 to 1884

- St. Leopold's Church

– a Baroque church of the Brothers Hospitallers with a hospital in the Vienna (Vídeňská) Street

- St. Augustine's Church

– finished in 1935

- Salesian church of Our Lady

– situated in Žabovřesky, Help of Christians from the 1990s

- Holy Trinity Church (former Charterhouse)

– situated in Královo Pole, built in the 1370s as a part of Carthusian monastery (founded 1375, abolished 1782), later reconstructed in Baroque style

- Assumption of the Virgin Mary Church (former Premonstratensian Abbey)

– situated in Zábrdovice, a Baroque church from the 1660s (interior from the 18th century), a part of the former Premonstratensian monastery abolished in 1780s with St. Cunigunde Church (dedicated 1211); as of 2010 it serves as a hospital

- Church of the Sacred Heart

– situated in Husovice, with Art Nouveau elements, finished 1910; since the 1990s administered by the Franciscans

- Church of St. Cyril and Methodius

– situated in Židenice, finished 1935

- Church of the Immaculate Conception

– situated in Trnitá, built in the 1910s in Art Nouveau style to replace the demolished St. Stephen Church

- St. Giles's Church

– situated in Komárov, started in the beginning of the 12th century (the oldest church in Brno), later rebuilt

=== Protestant ===
- Hussite Church in Botanická Street

– a functionalistic building from 1928 to 1929

- Hussite Church in Královo Pole
- Hussite Church in Židenice
- Evangelical Church in Židenice

=== The Church of Jesus Christ of Latter-day Saints ===
- Meetinghouse on Sochor Street in the Žabovřesky District.

=== Non-Christian places of worship ===
- 'Agudas Achim' Synagogue in Skořepka Street

- The only remaining one of Brno' synagogues, a functionalistic building from the 1930s

- In late January 2024, two youths attempted to set fire to the synagogue using an improvised incendiary device, an act that police investigated as a hate-motivated and terror-linked offence. One of the accused was later charged with attempted arson and other violent crimes, including attempted murder, and the case was brought before the Regional Court in Brno. Police uncovered the plot during an investigation into a group spreading extremist content online and promoting terrorist organisations.

- Mosque

- In Vienna (Vídeňská) Street; the first mosque in the Czech Republic (opened 1998), with no minaret

=== Gallery ===
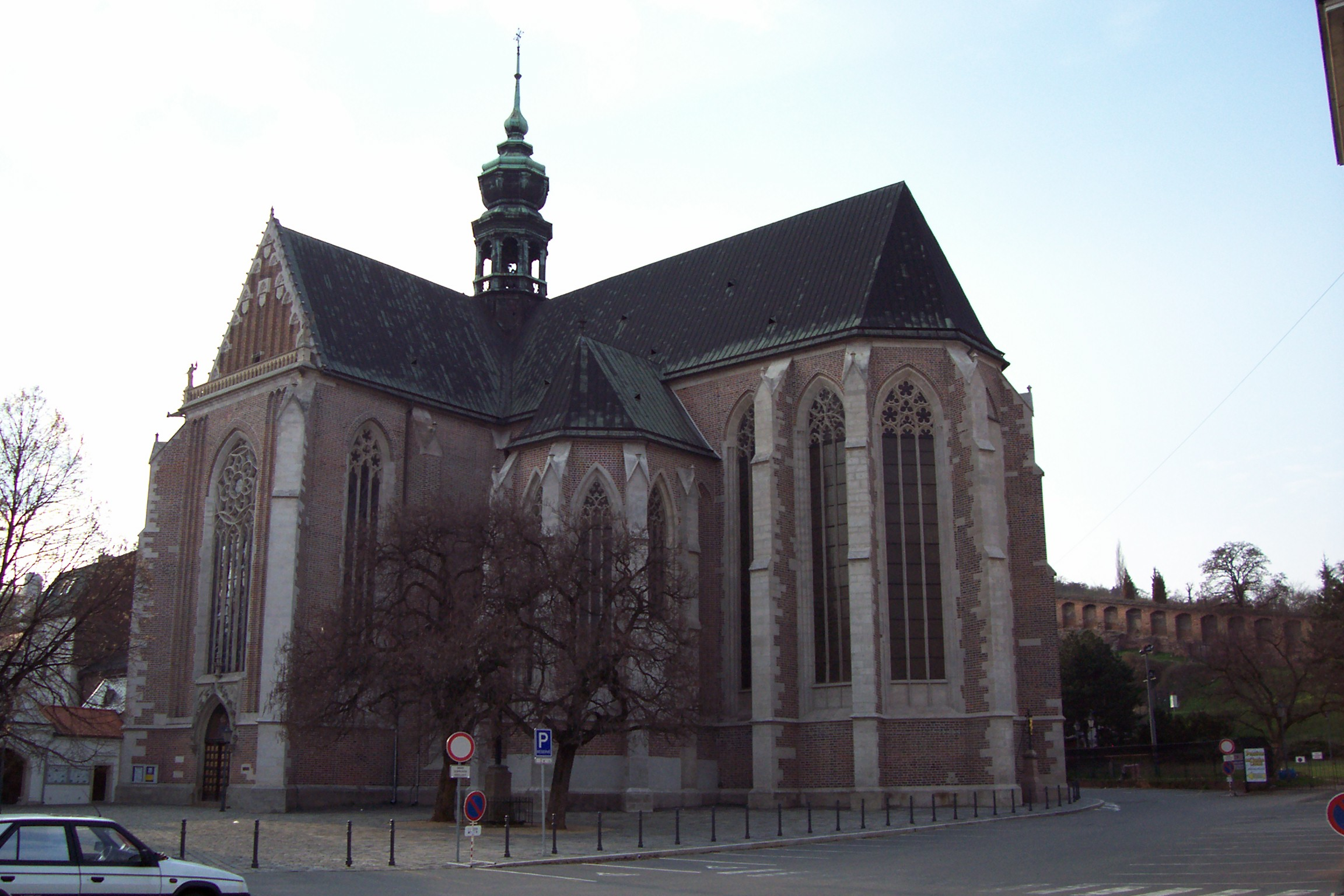
The Augustinian Abbey

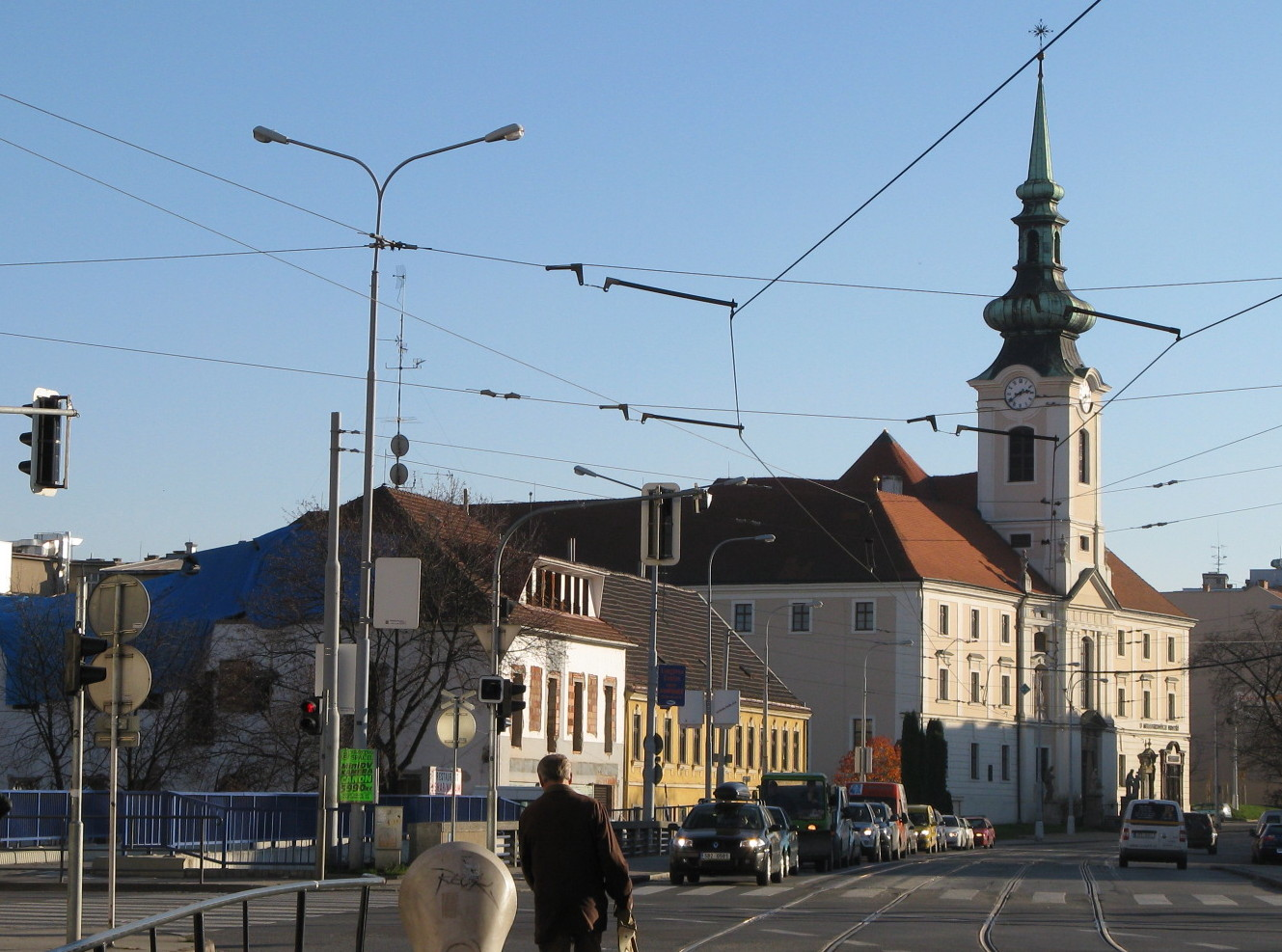
St. Leopold Church

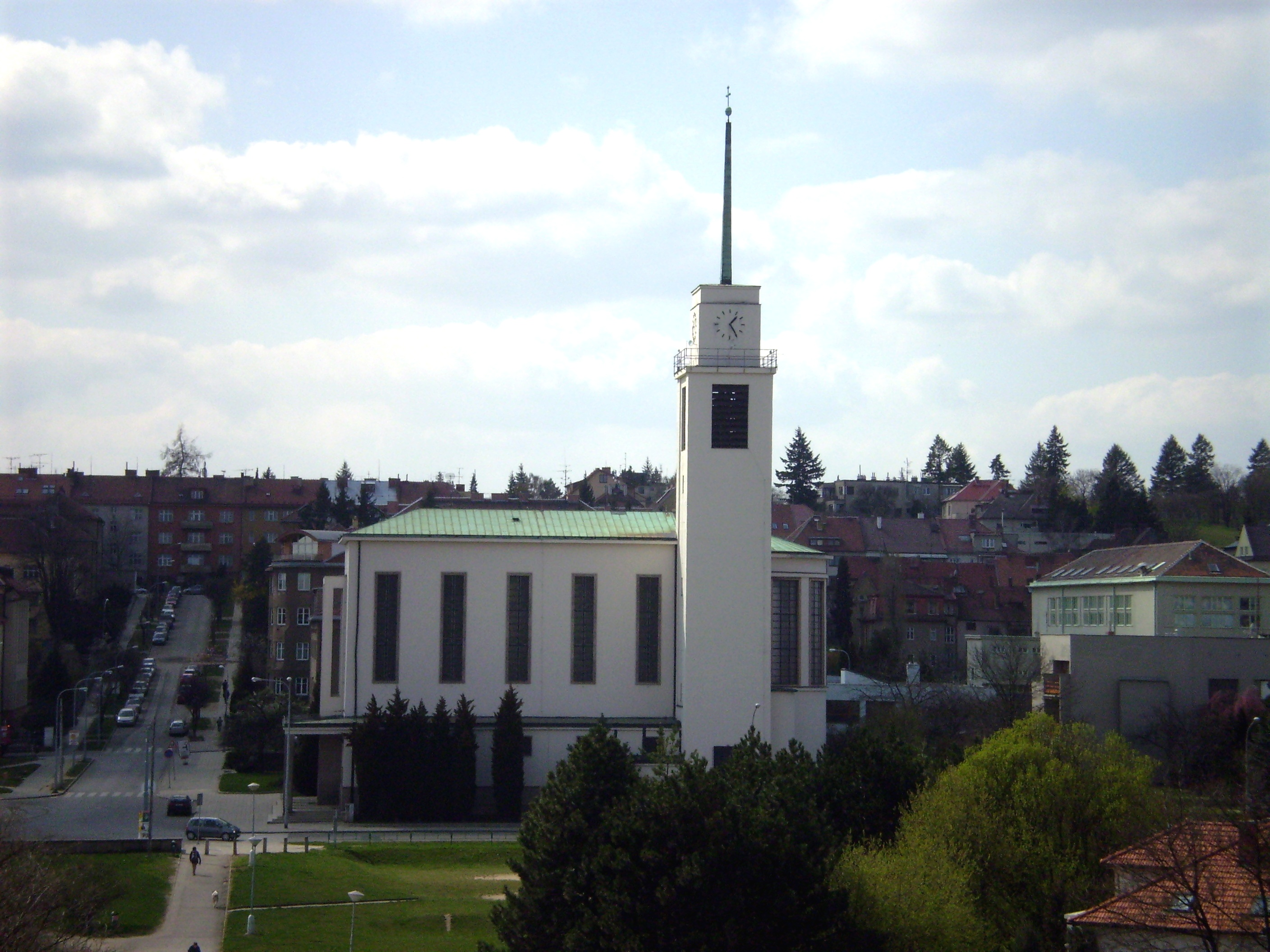
St. Augustine Church

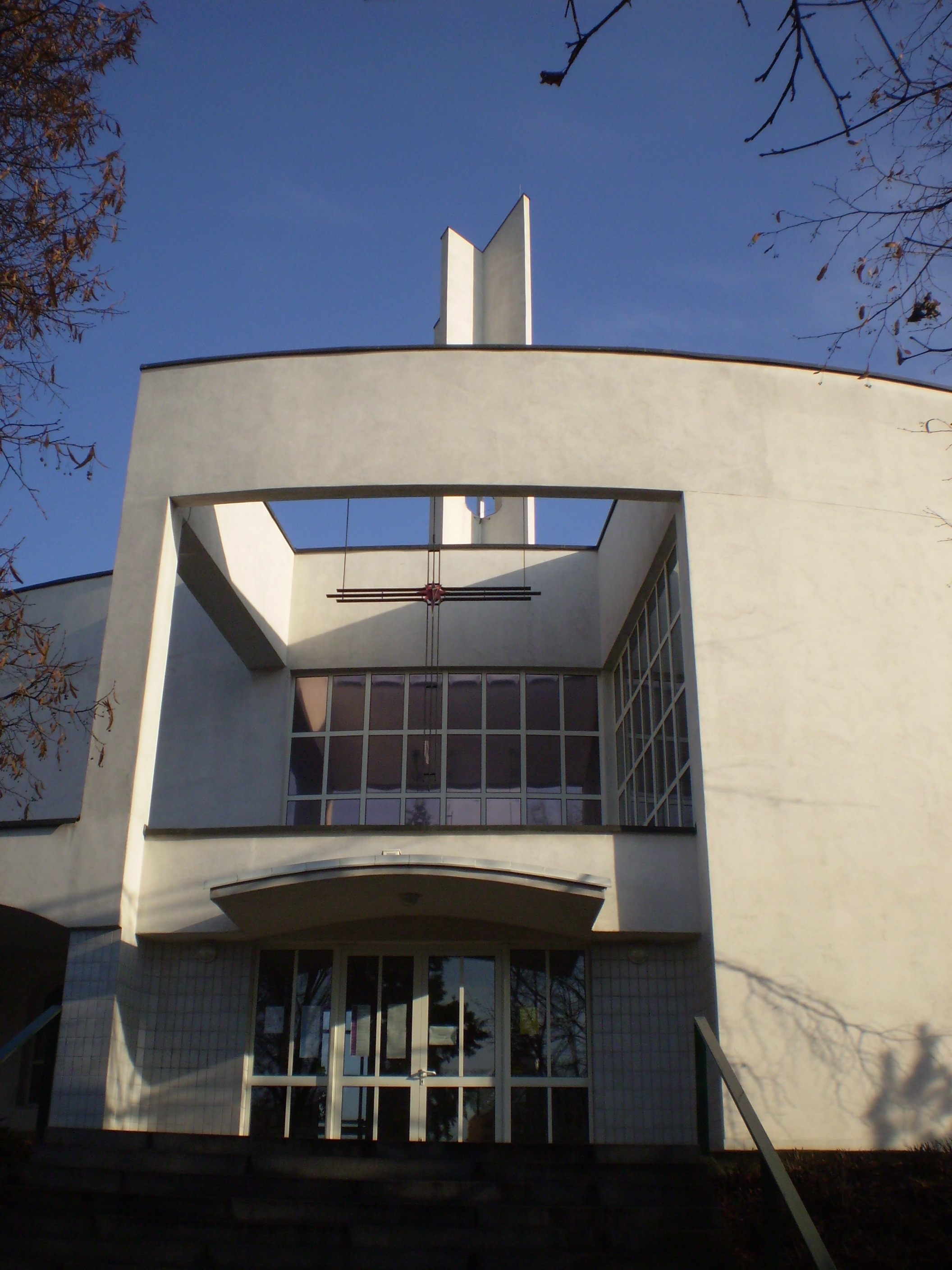
Salesian Church in Žabovřesky

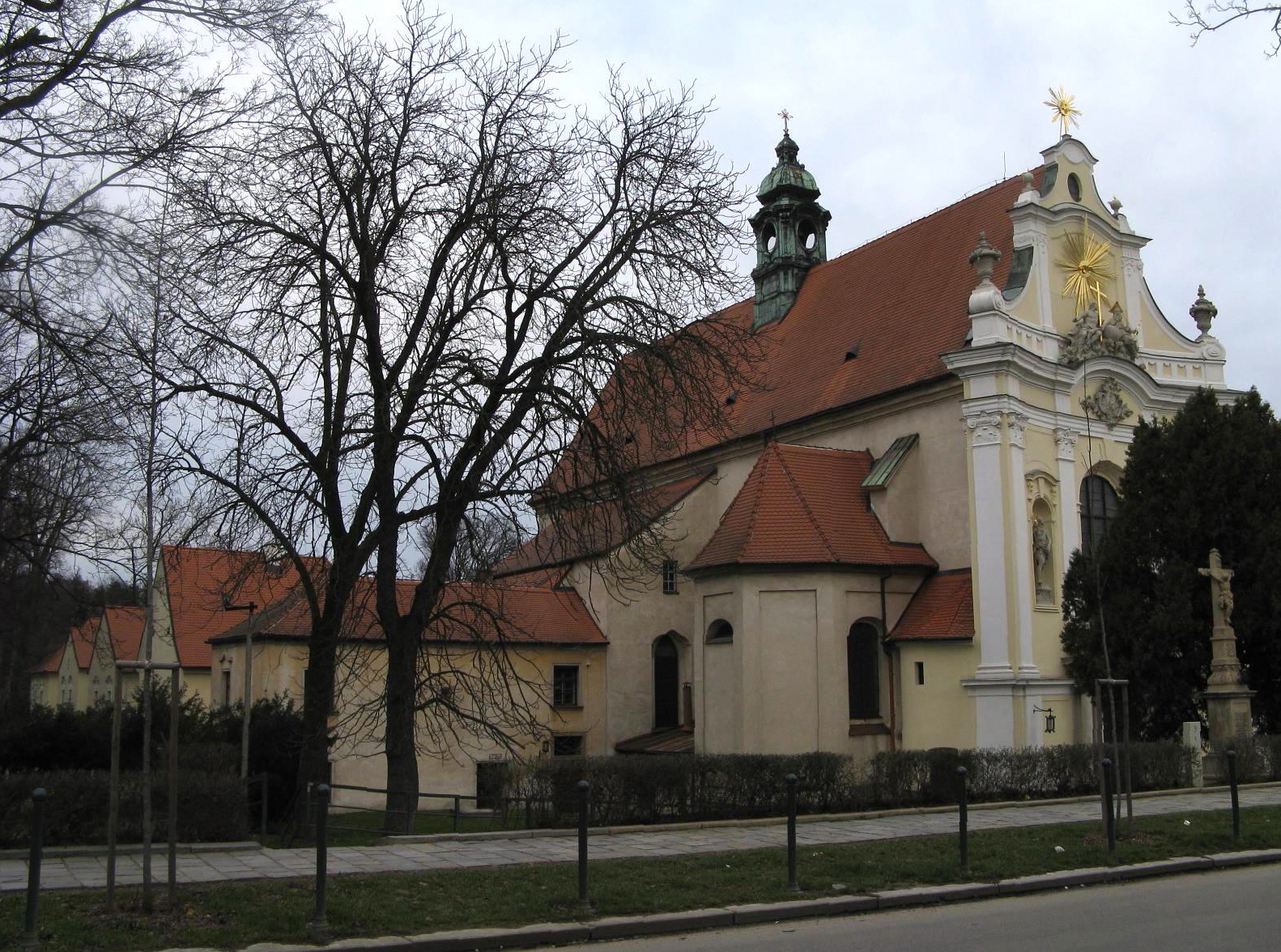
Church in Královo Pole with a part of former Charterhouse

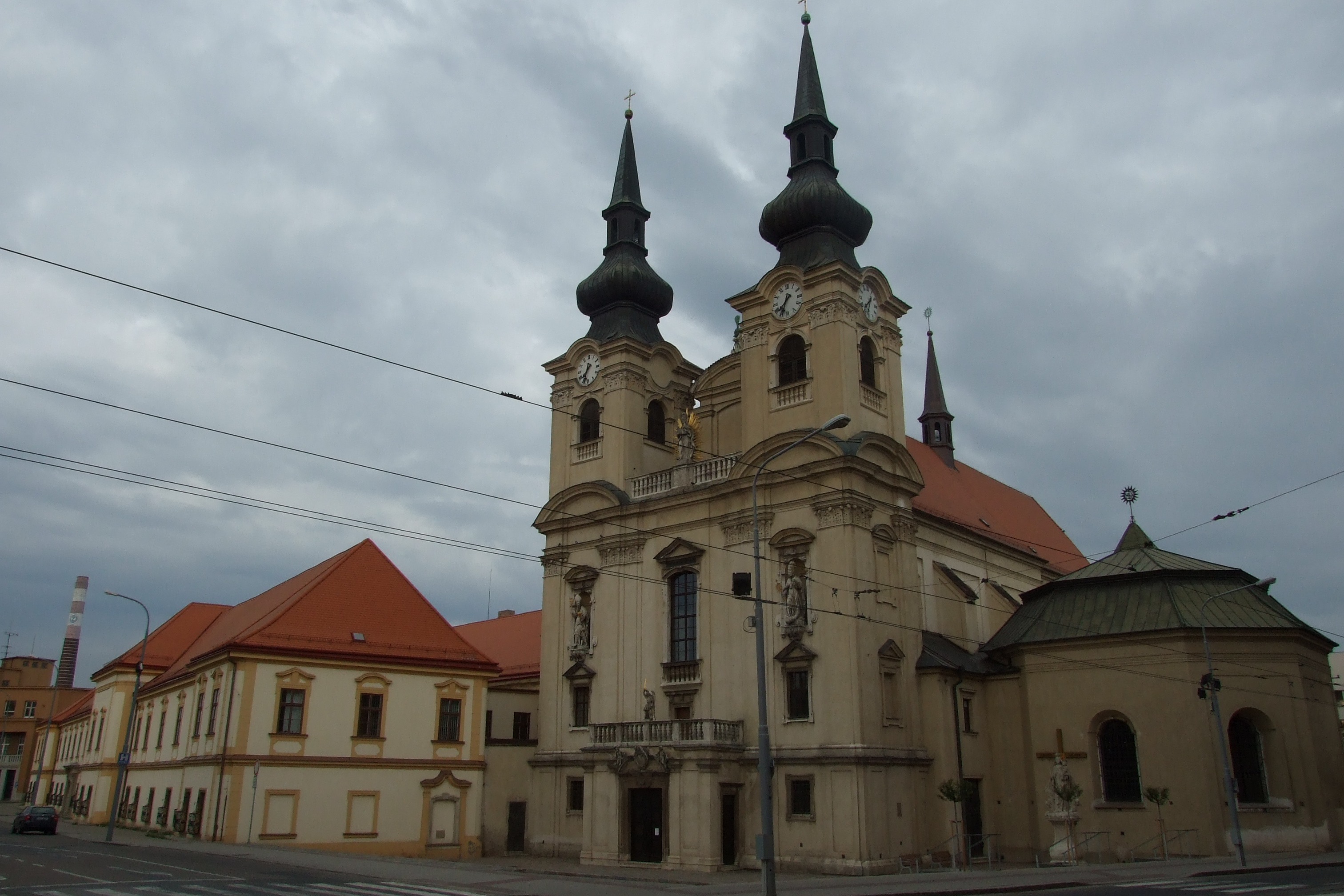
Church in Zábrdovice

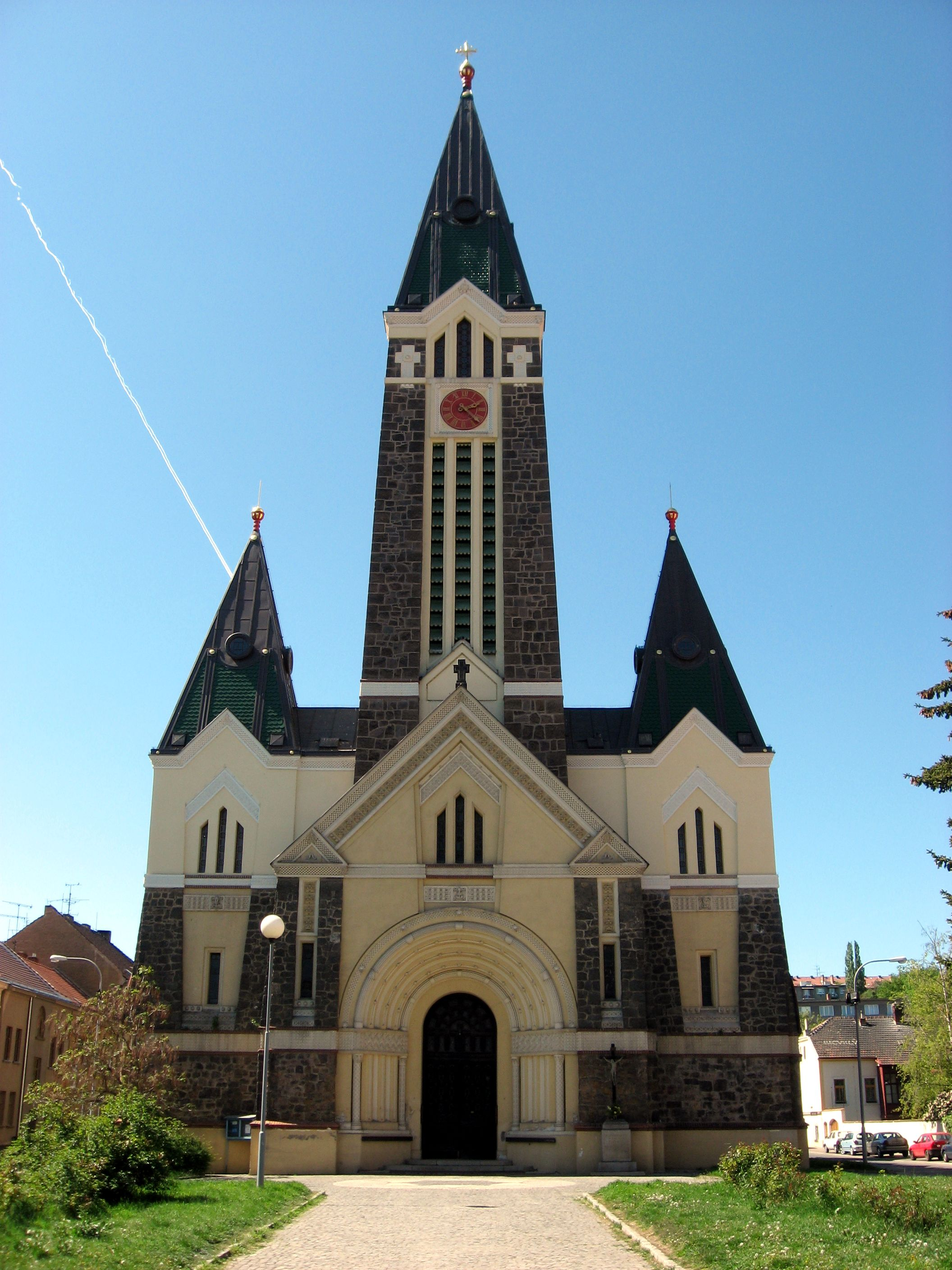
Church in Husovice

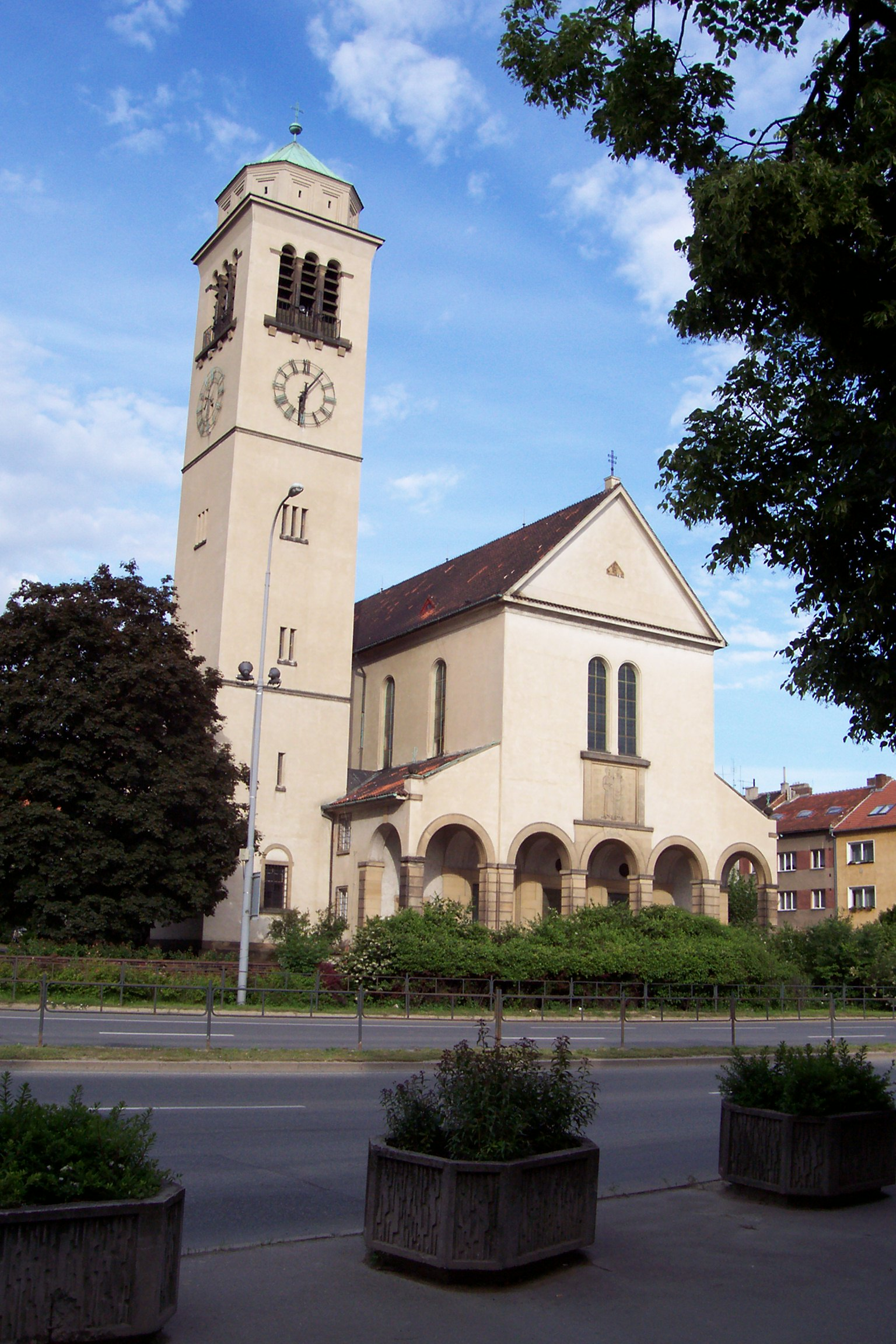
Roman Catholic Church in Židenice

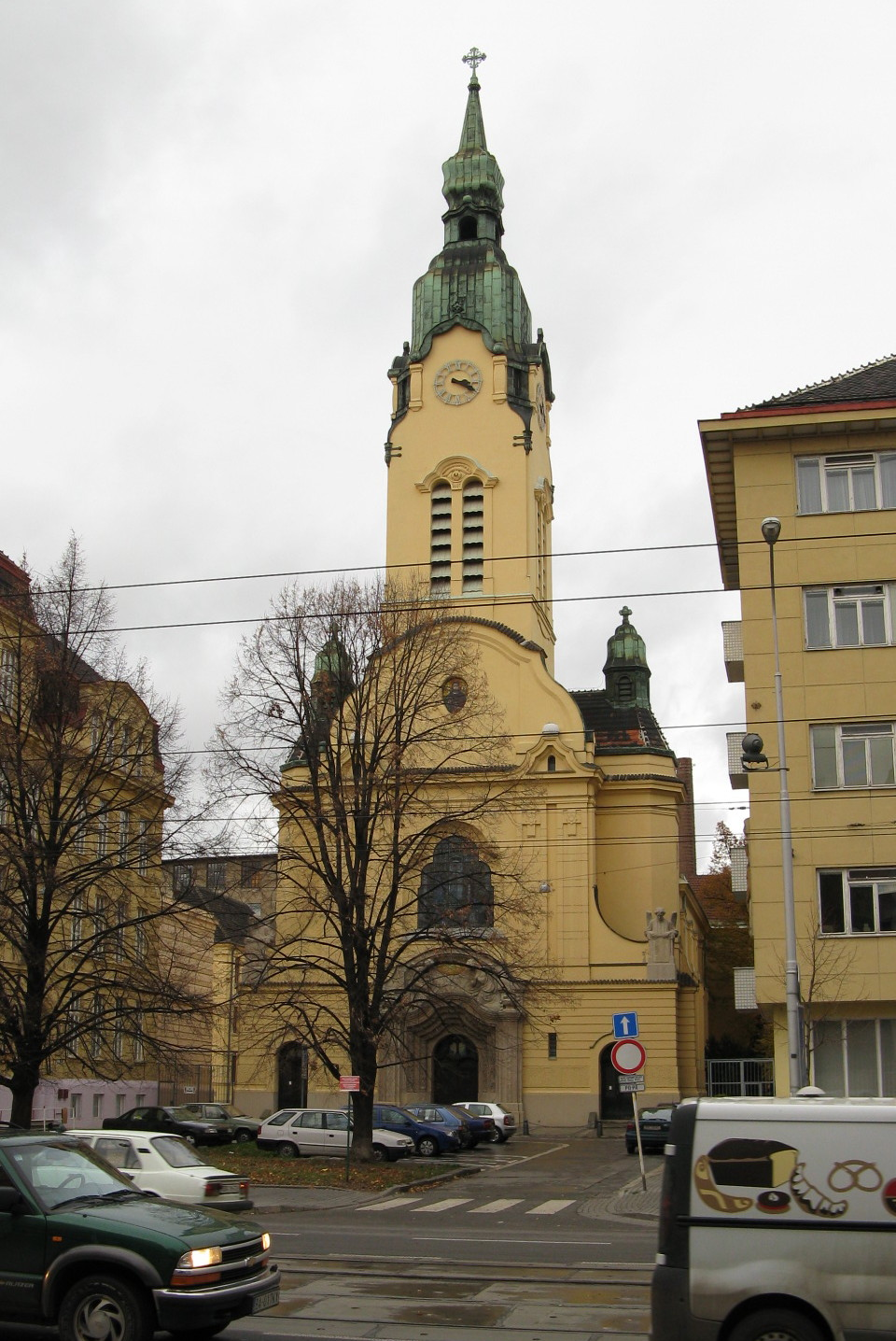
Church of the Immaculate Conception

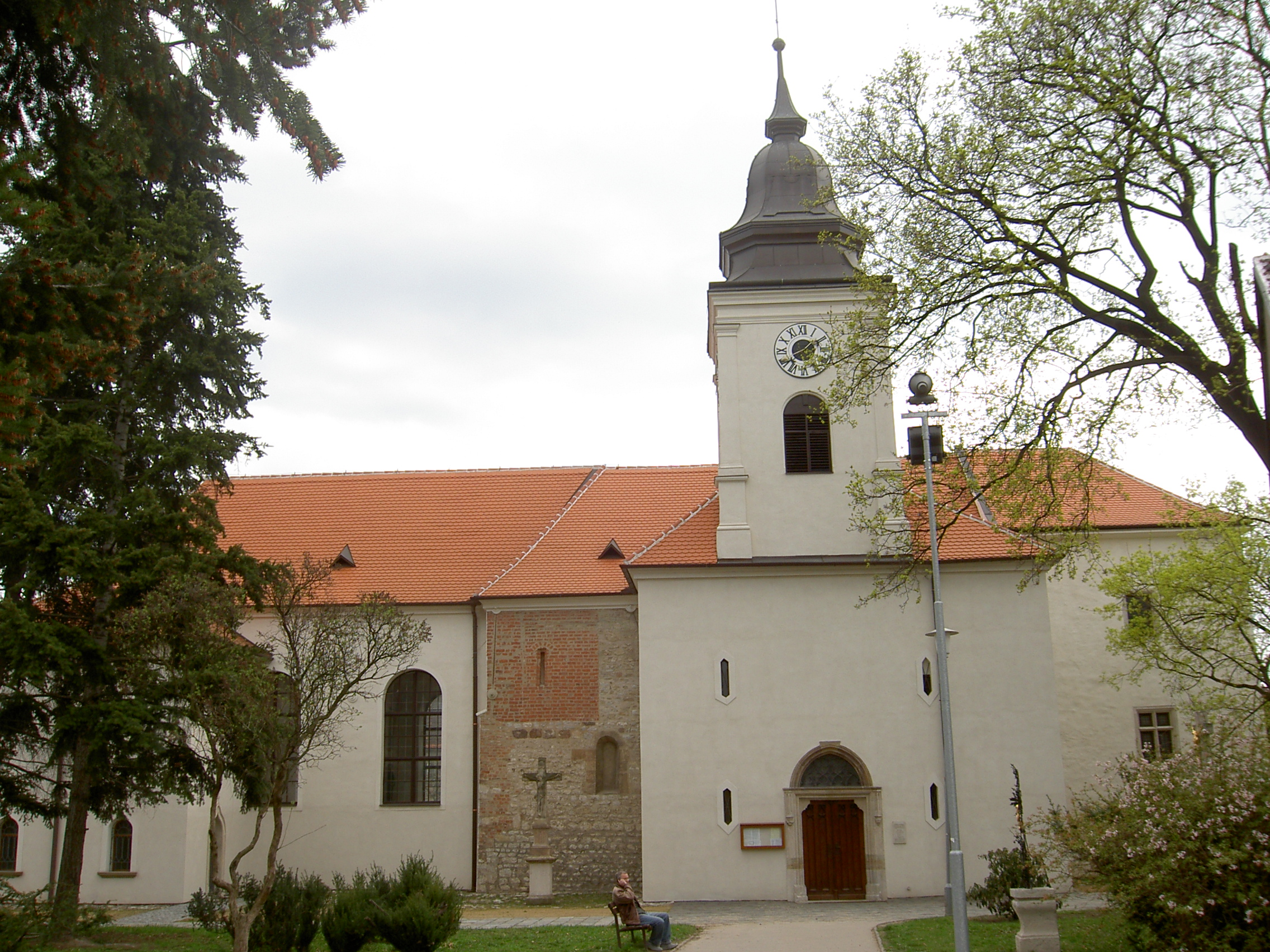
Church in Komárov

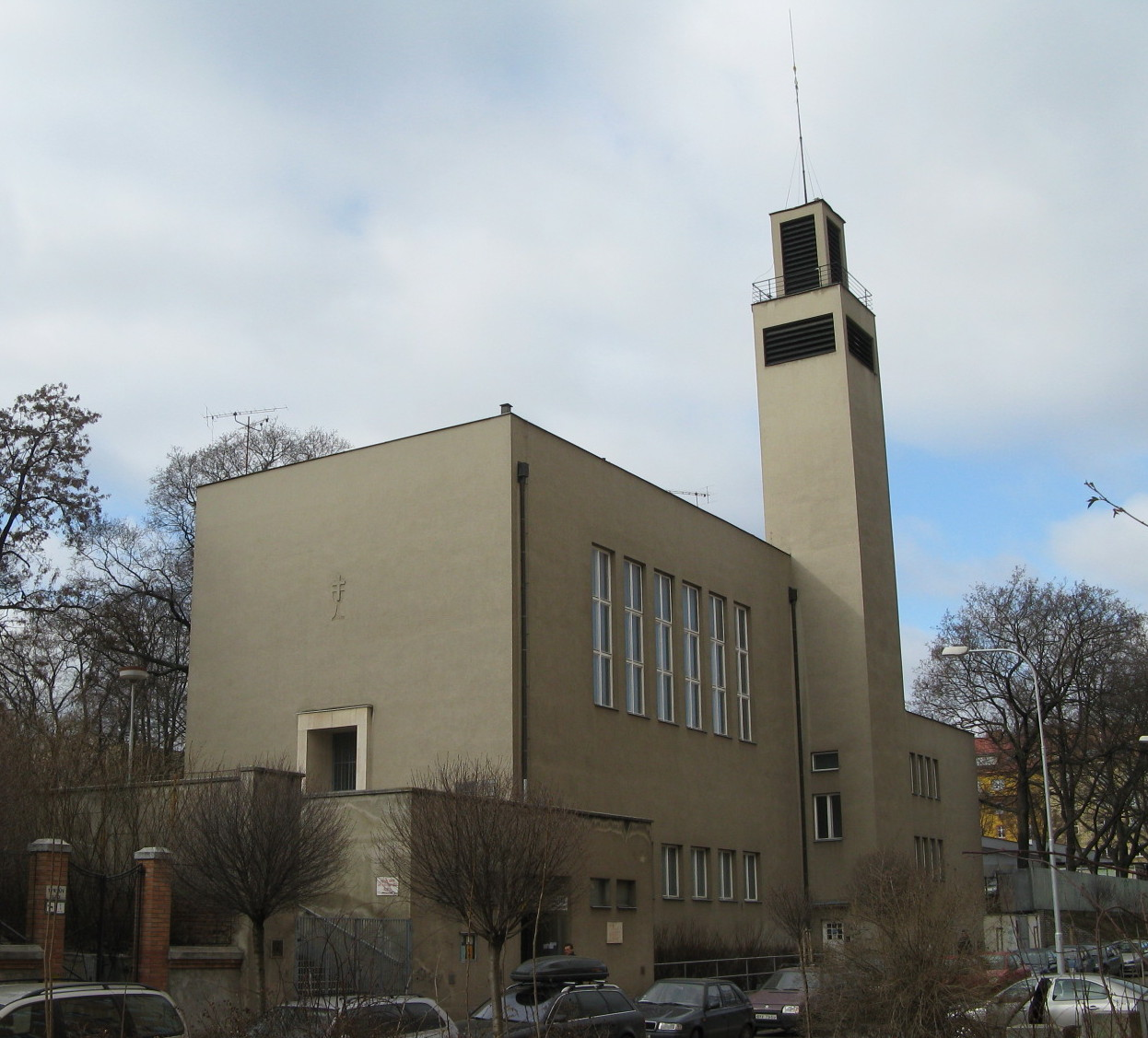
Hussite church on Botanická Street

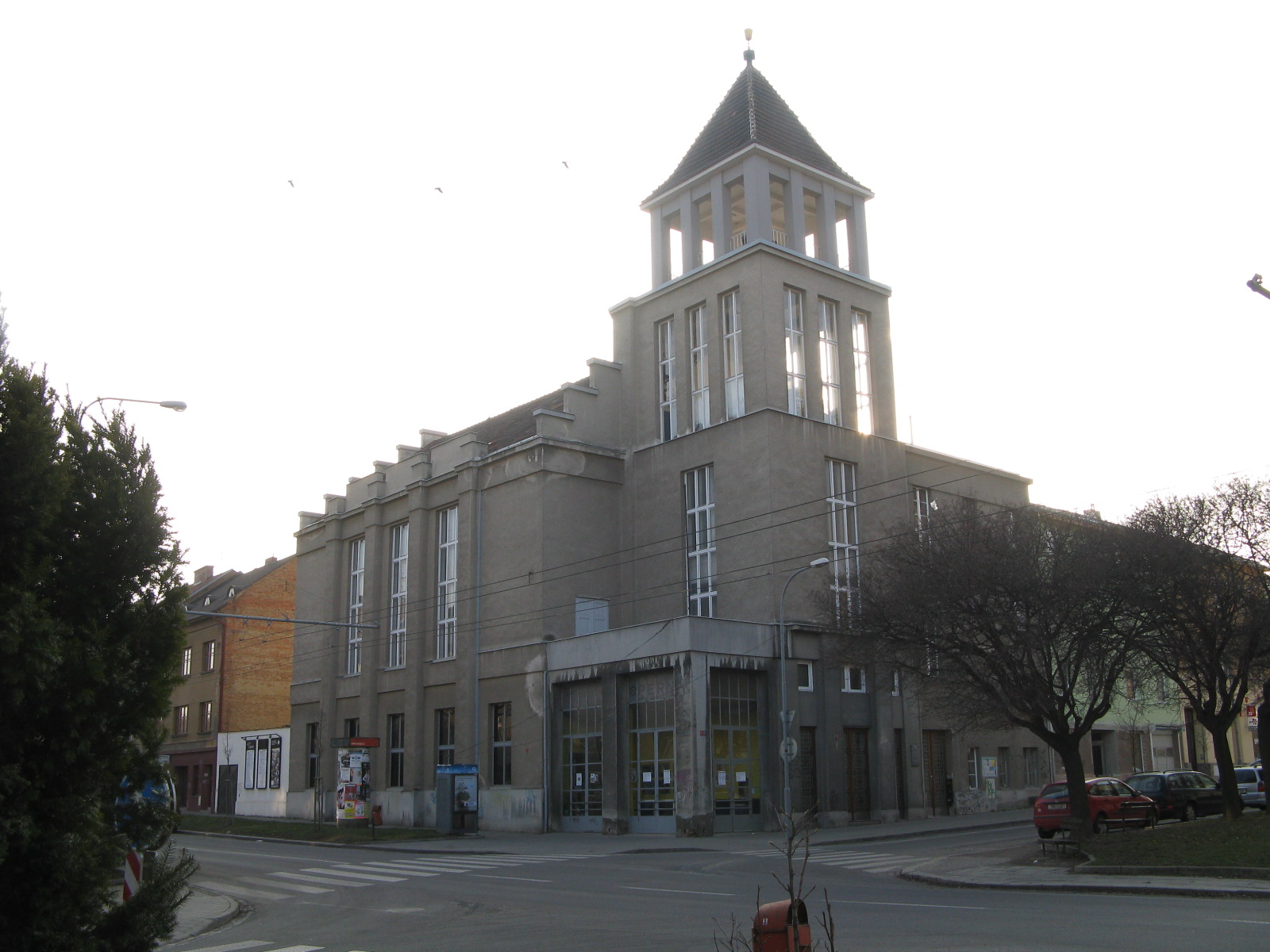
Hussite church in Královo Pole

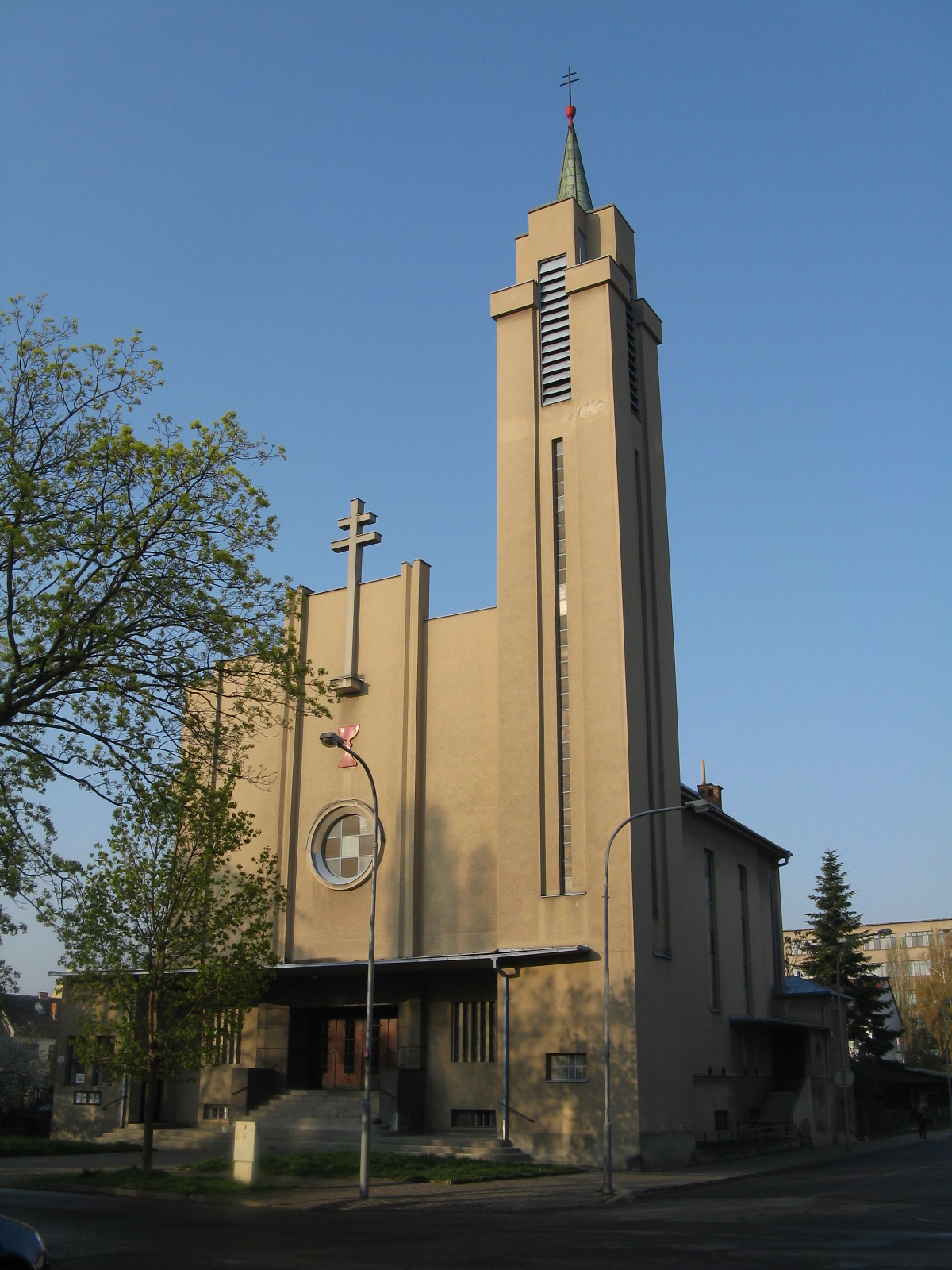
Hussite church in Židenice

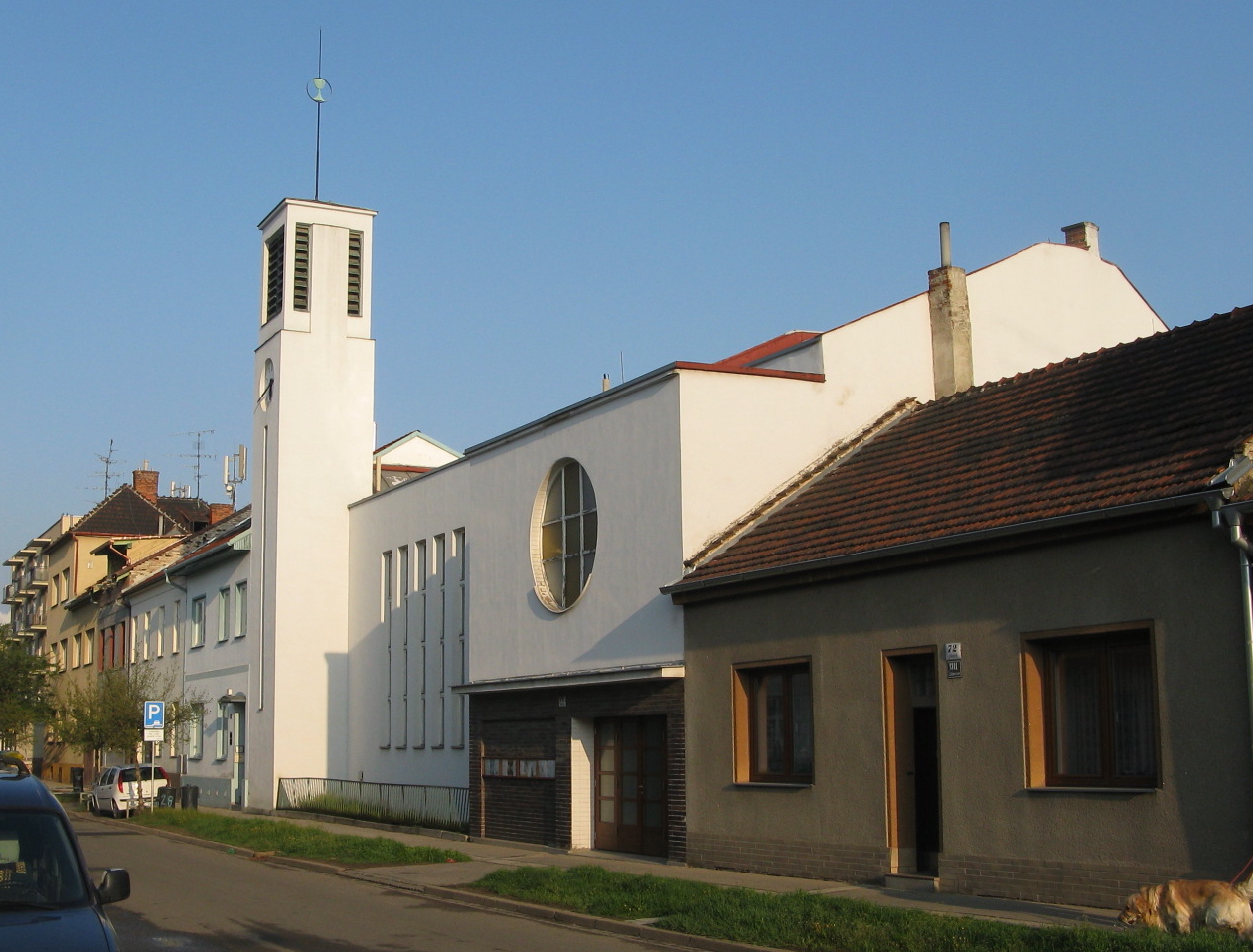
Evangelical church in Židenice

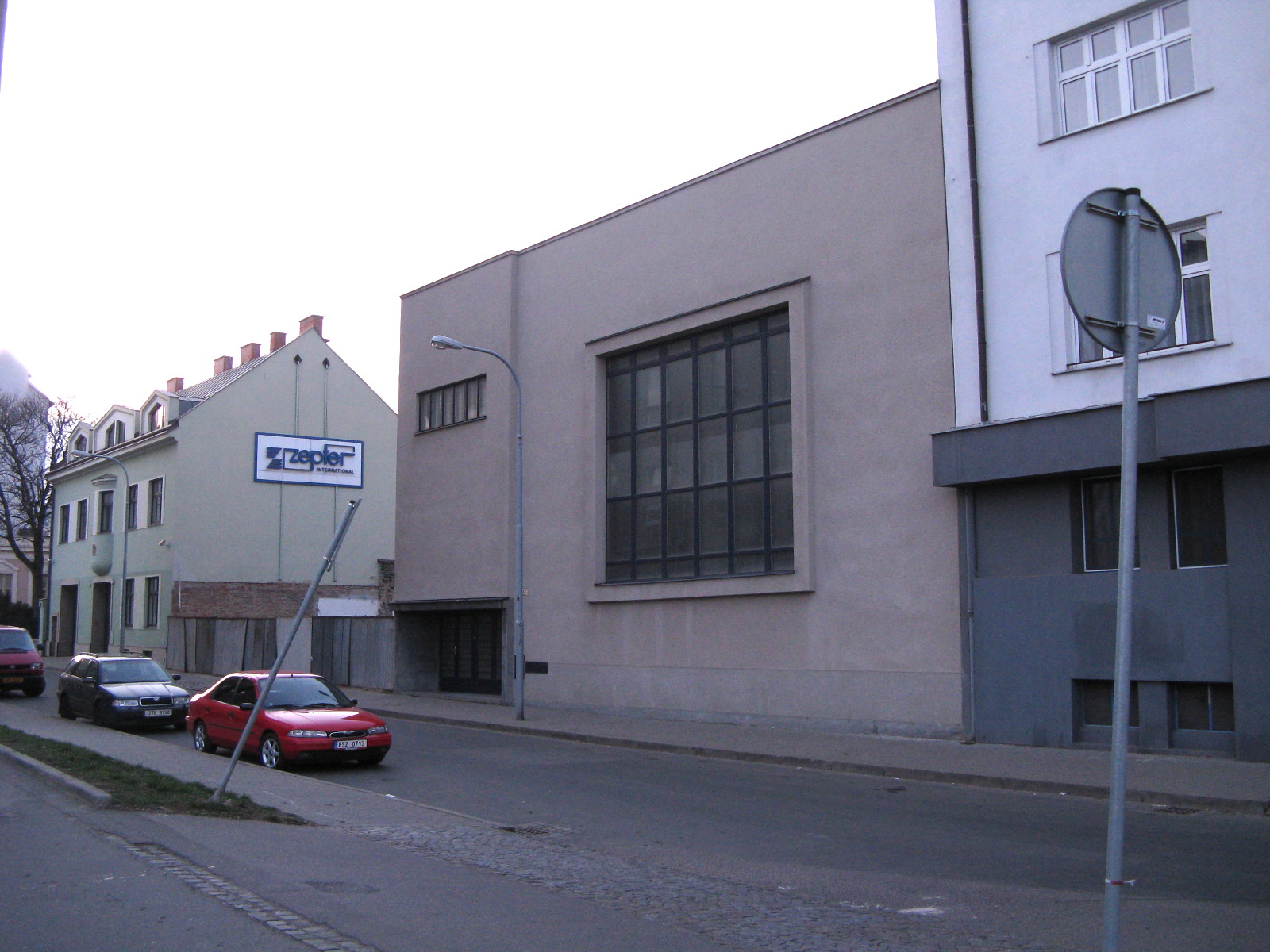
Brno Synagogue

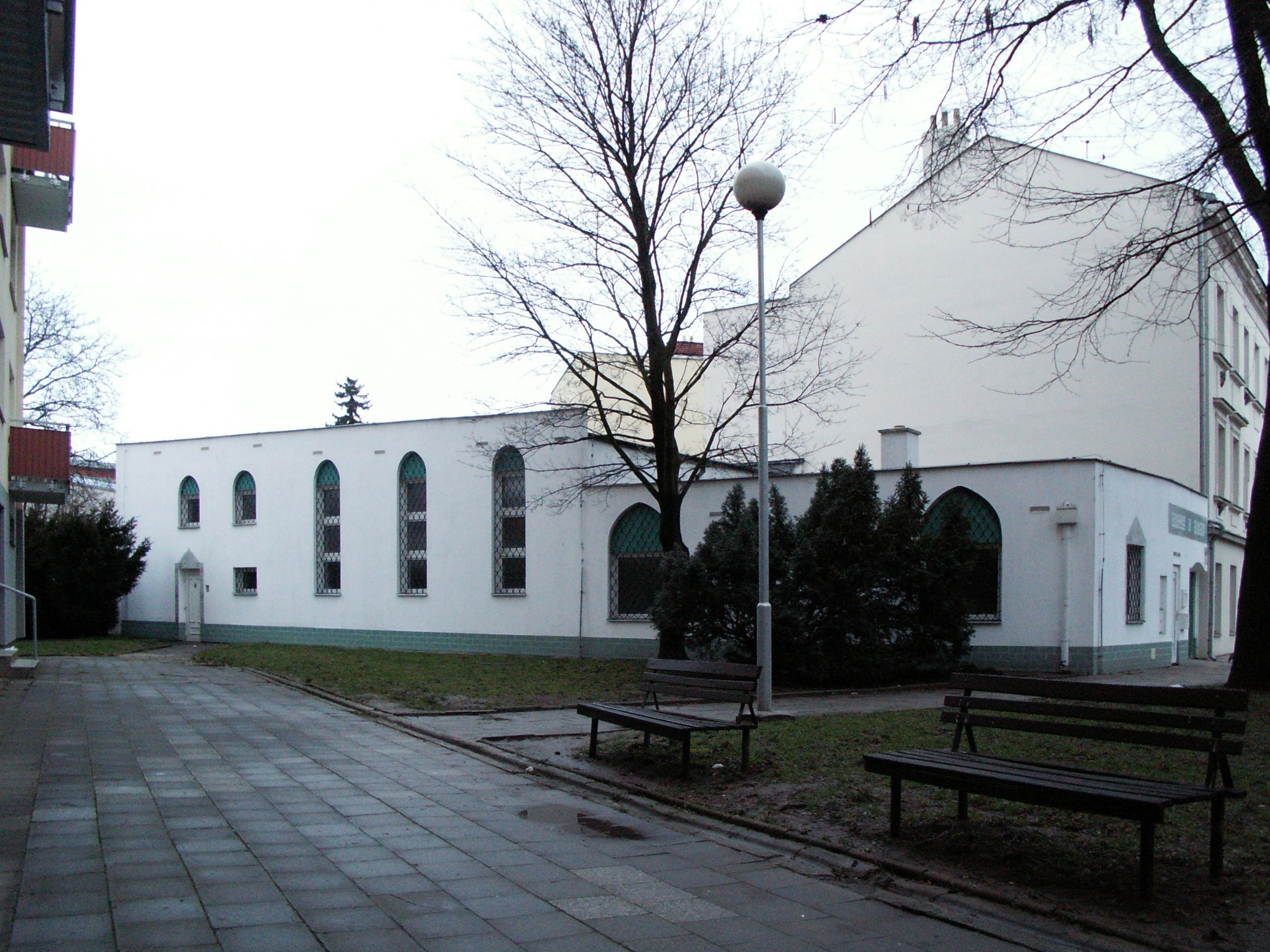
Brno Mosque

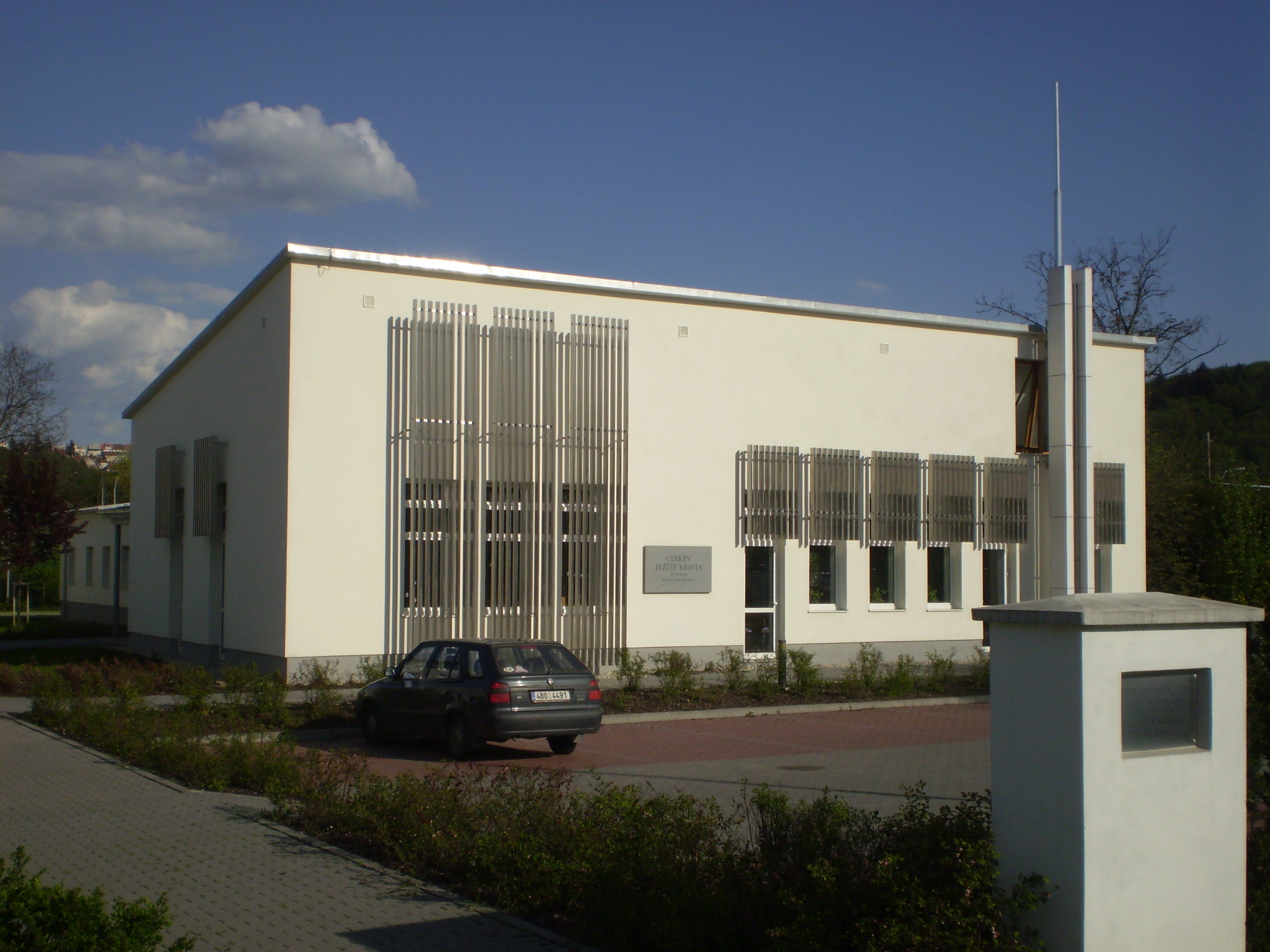
LDS (Mormon) meetinghouse

== Joined villages and large housing estates ==
- Horní Heršpice – St. Clement Hofbauer Church
- Přízřenice – St. Margaret Church
- Starý Lískovec – St. John of Nepomuk Church
- Komín – St. Lawrence Church
- Bystrc – Church of Sts. John the Baptist and John the Apostle
- Žebětín – St. Bartholomew Church
- Řečkovice – St. Lawrence Church
- Soběšice – Church of the Immaculate Conception
- Obřany – St. Wenceslaus Church
- Líšeň – St. Giles Church
- Slatina – Holy Cross Church
- Tuřany – Church of the Annunciation
- Tuřany – Hussite Church

=== Gallery ===
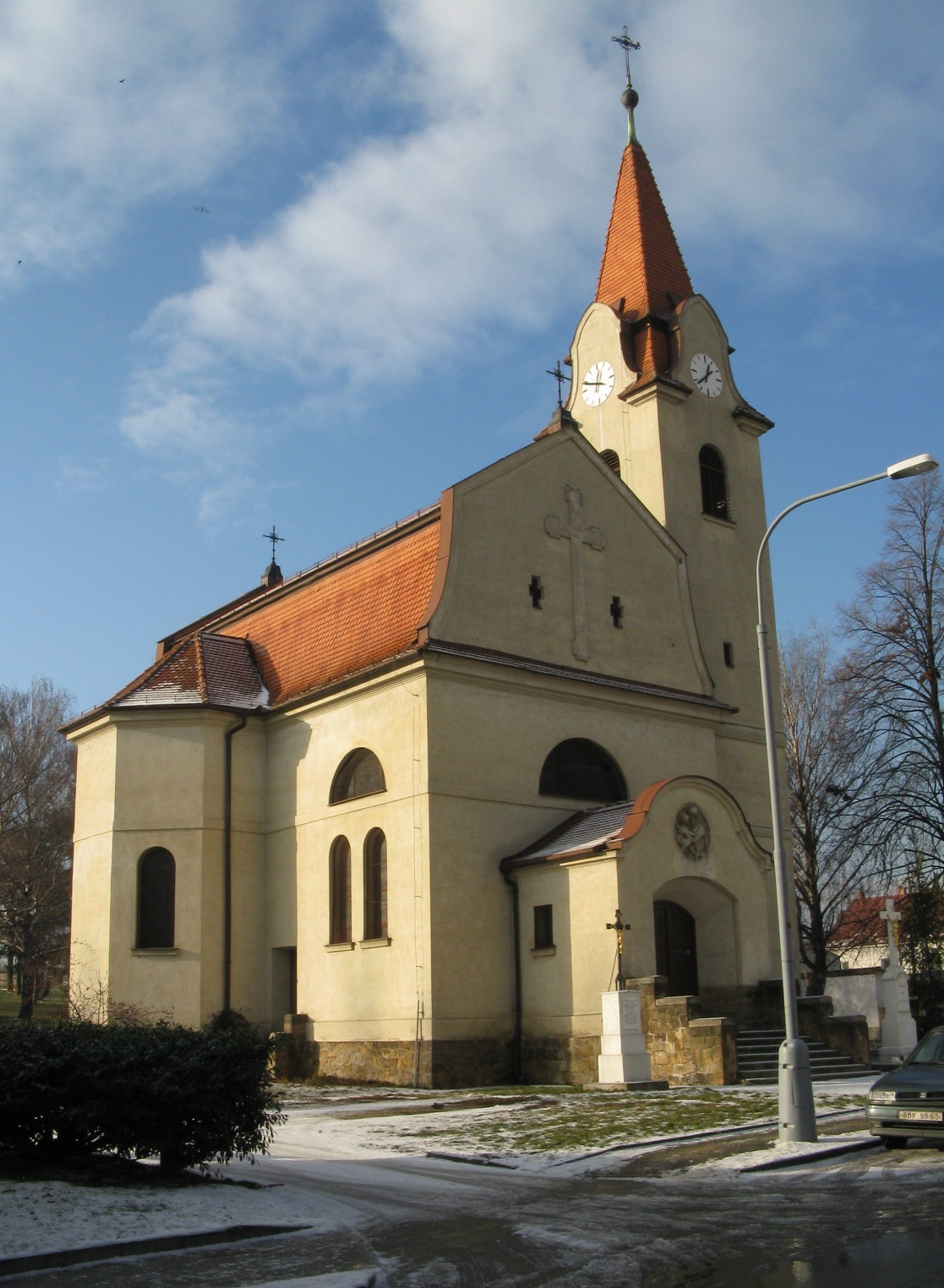
Church in Horní Heršpice

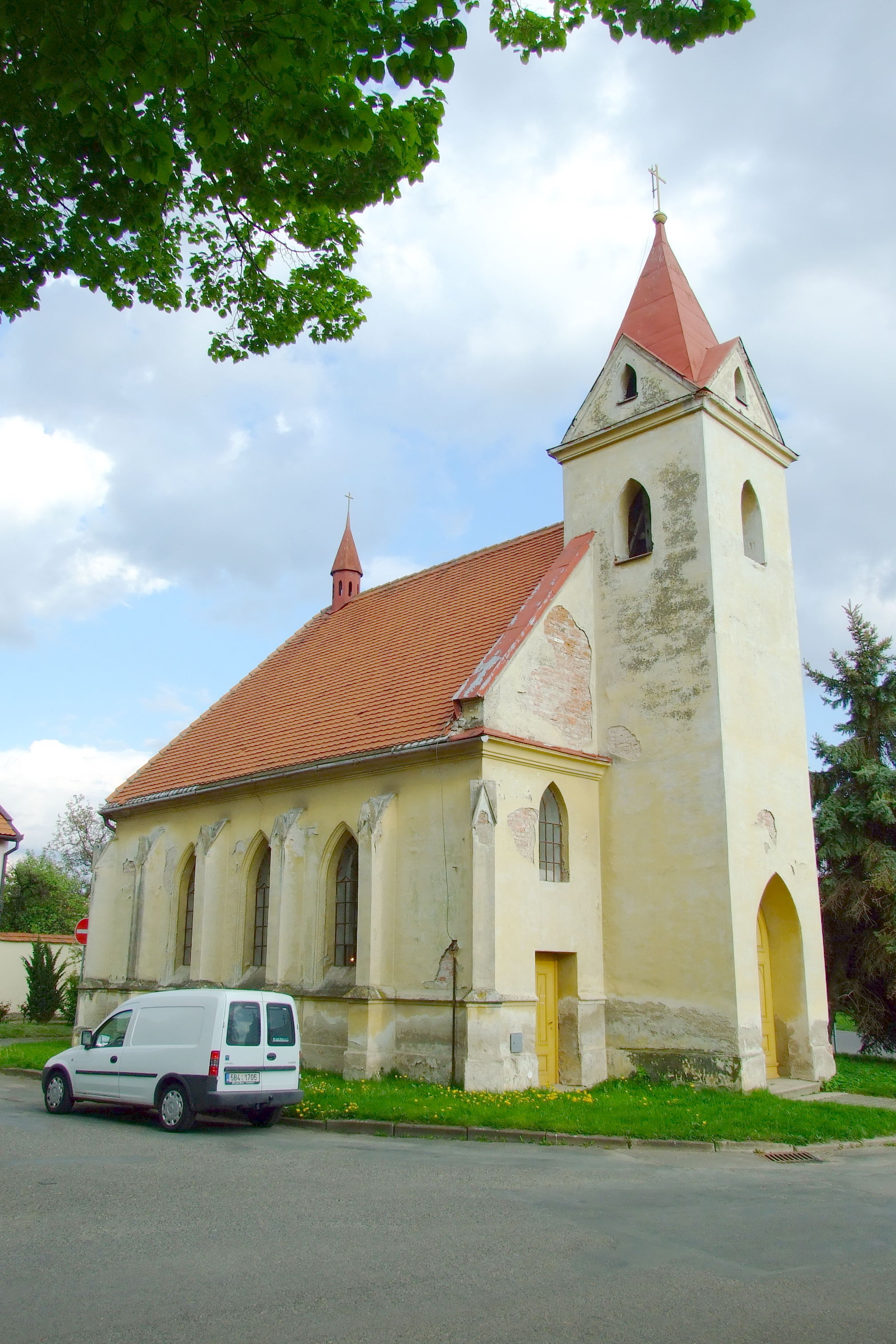
Church in Přízřenice

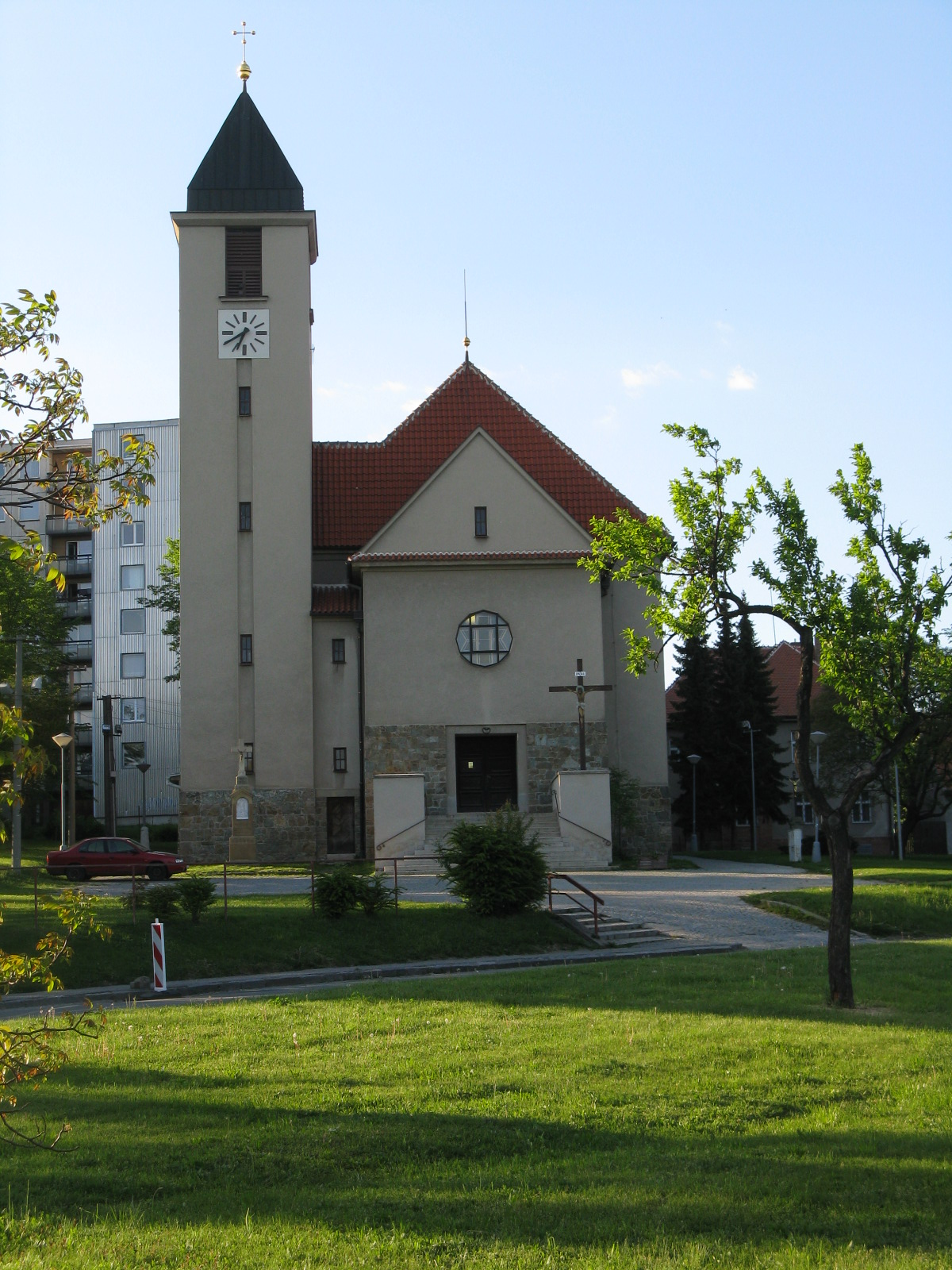
Church in Starý Lískovec

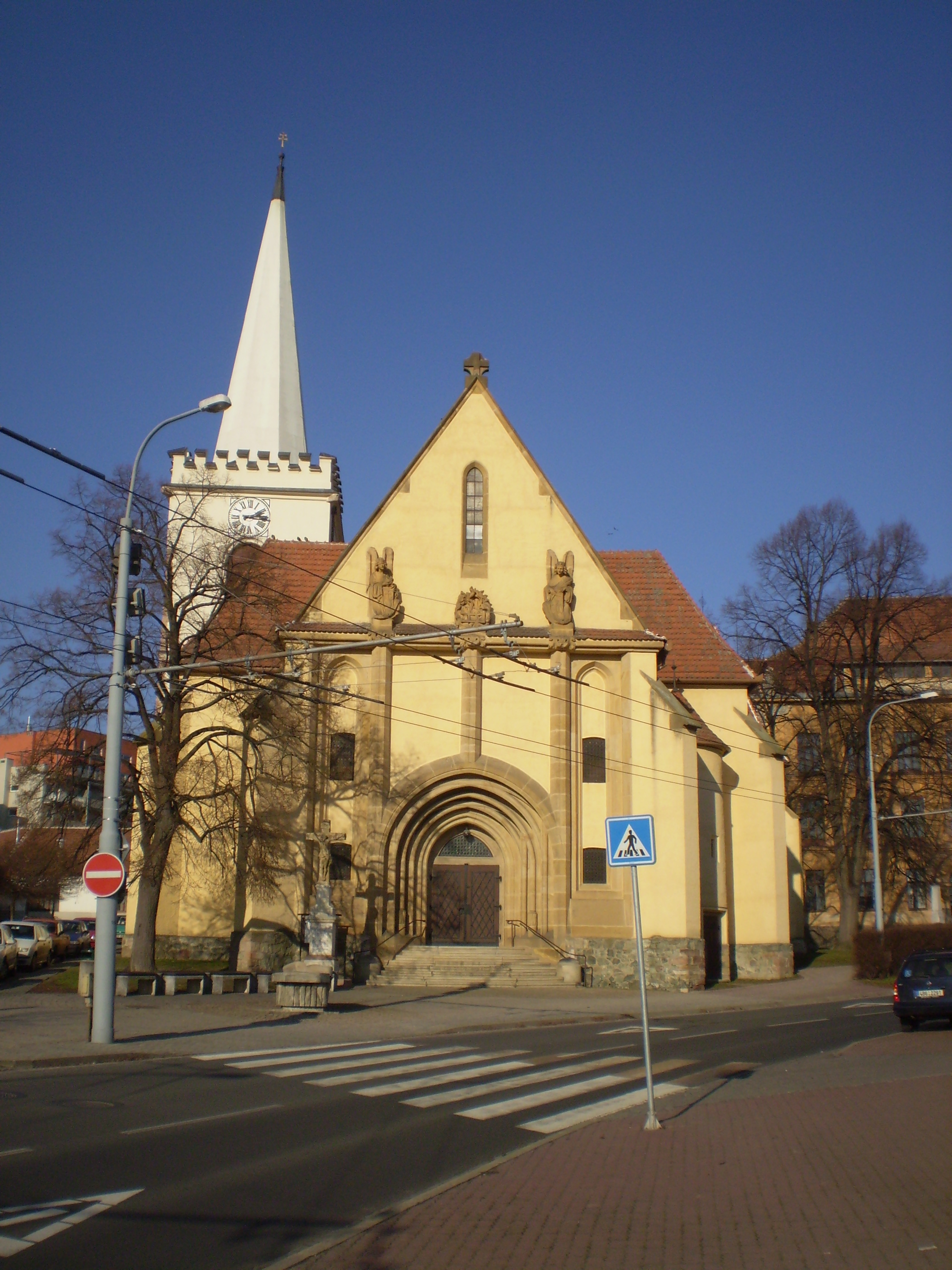
Church in Komín

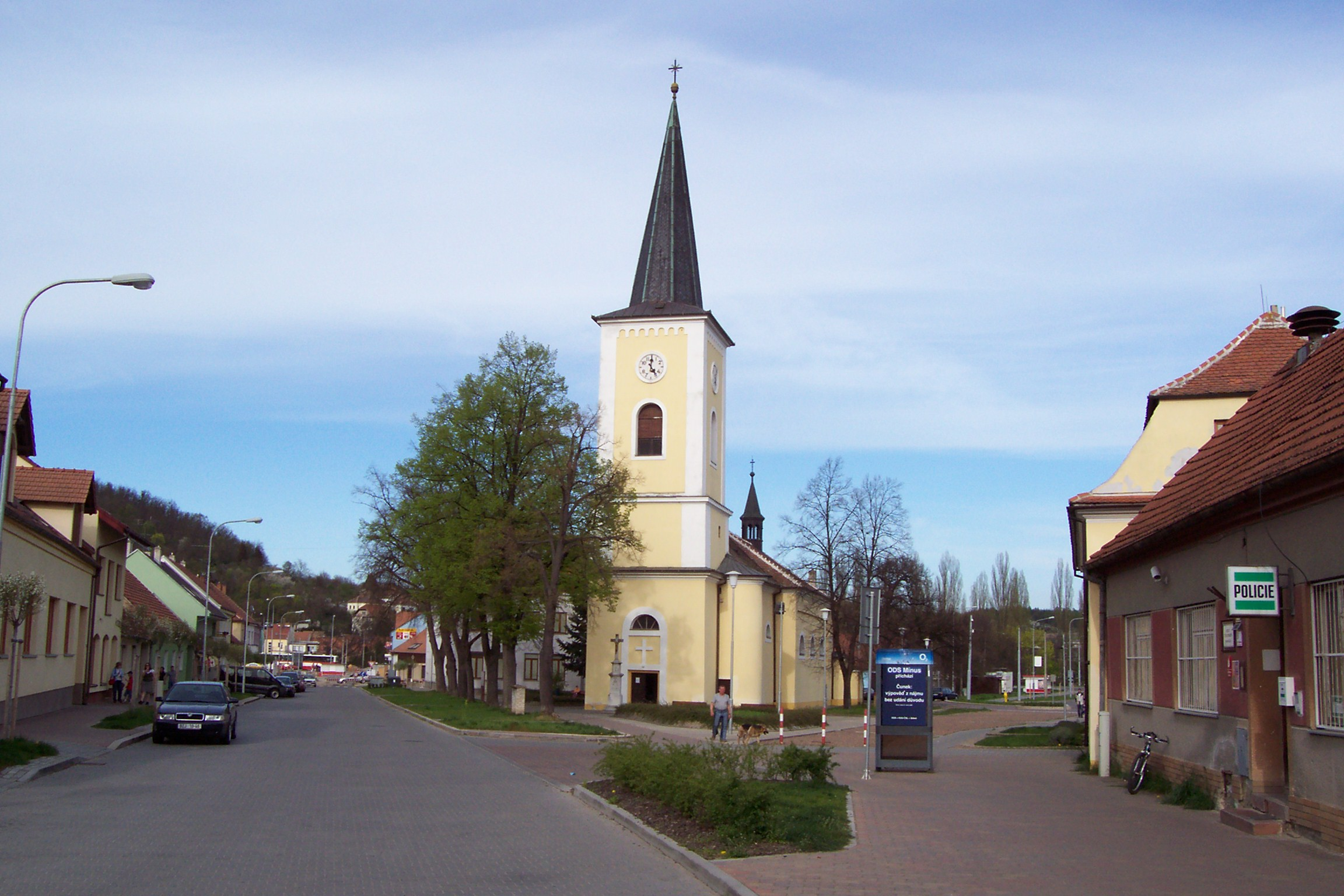
Church in Bystrc

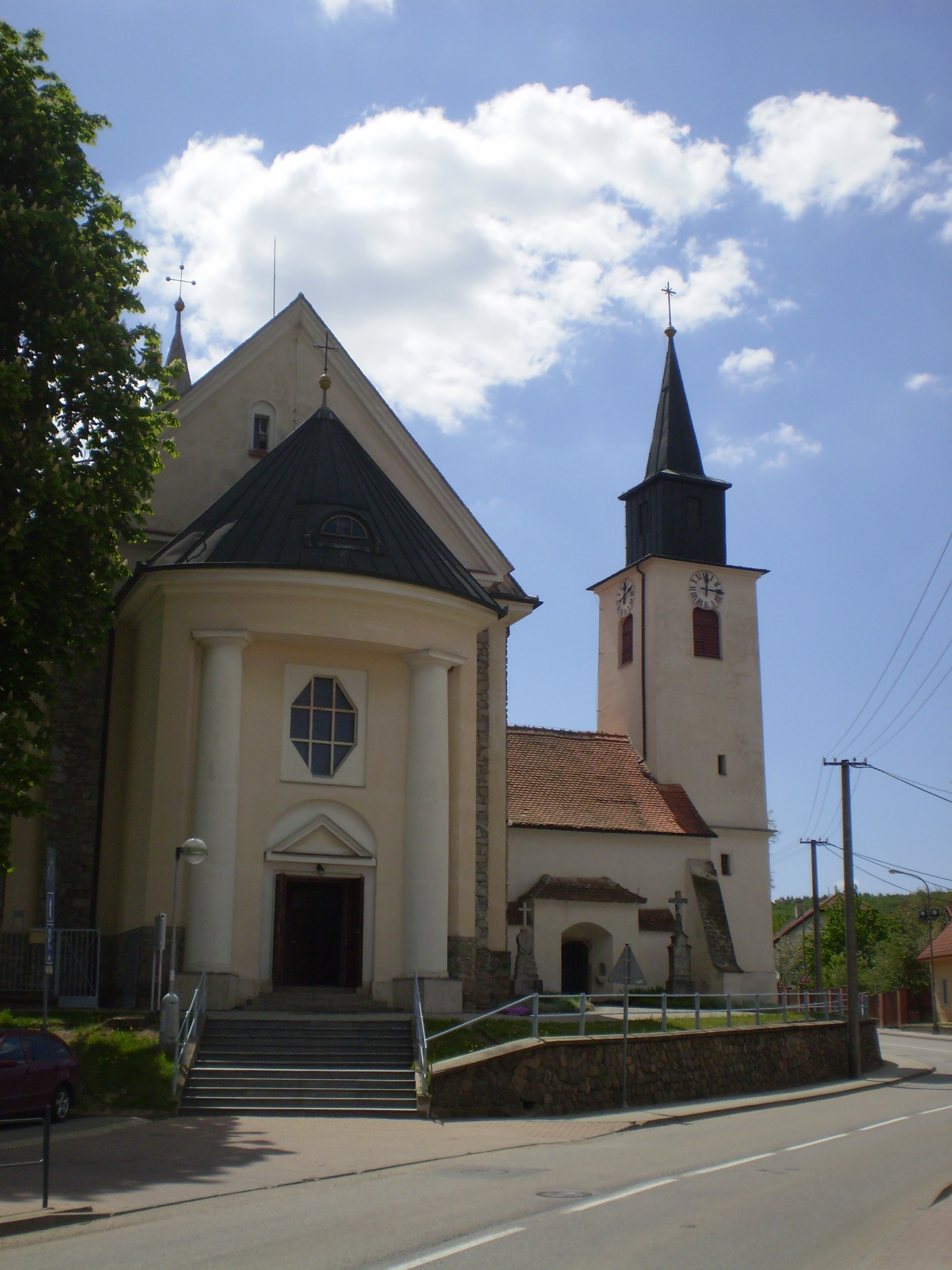
Church in Žebětín

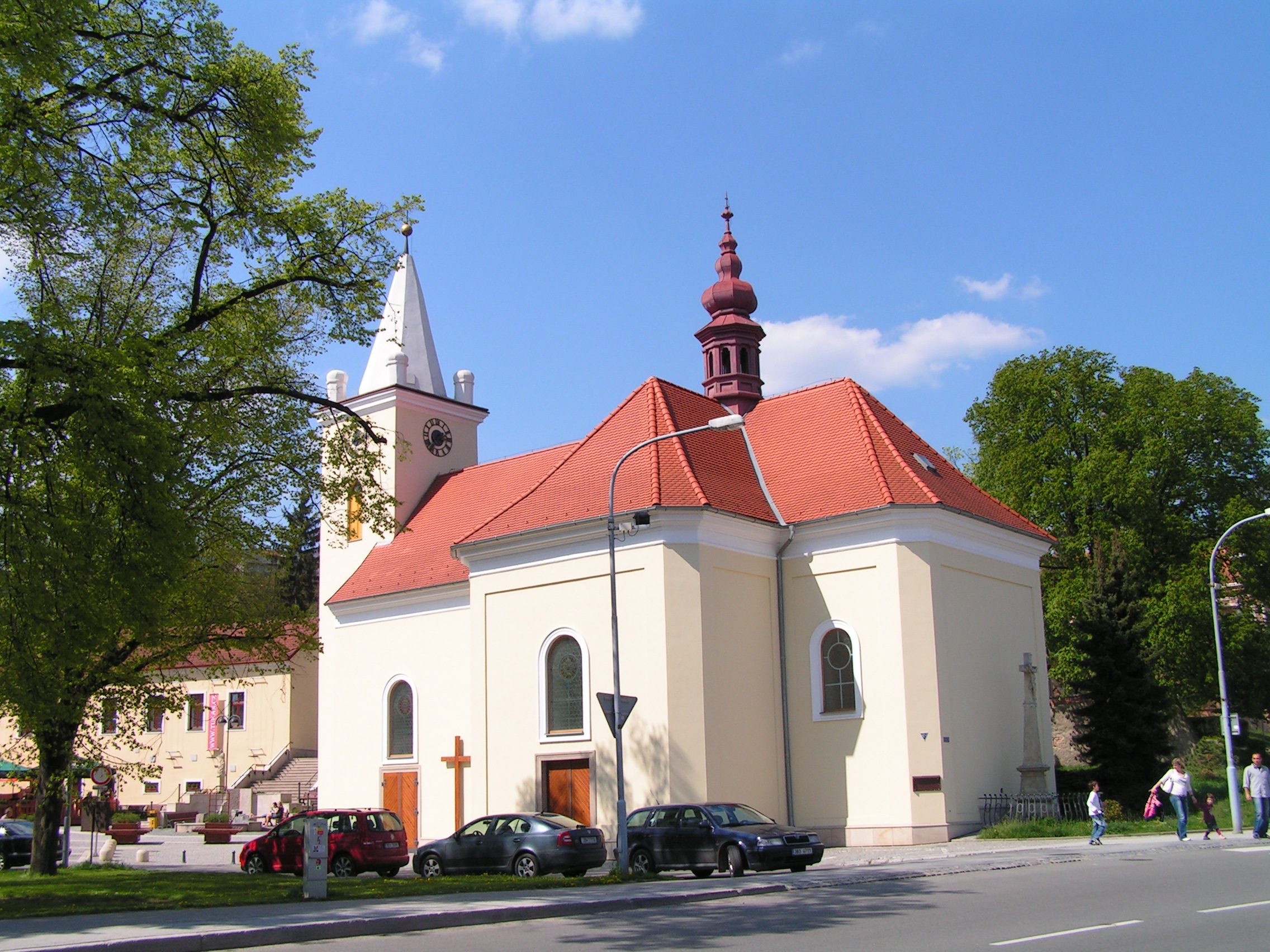
Church in Řečkovice

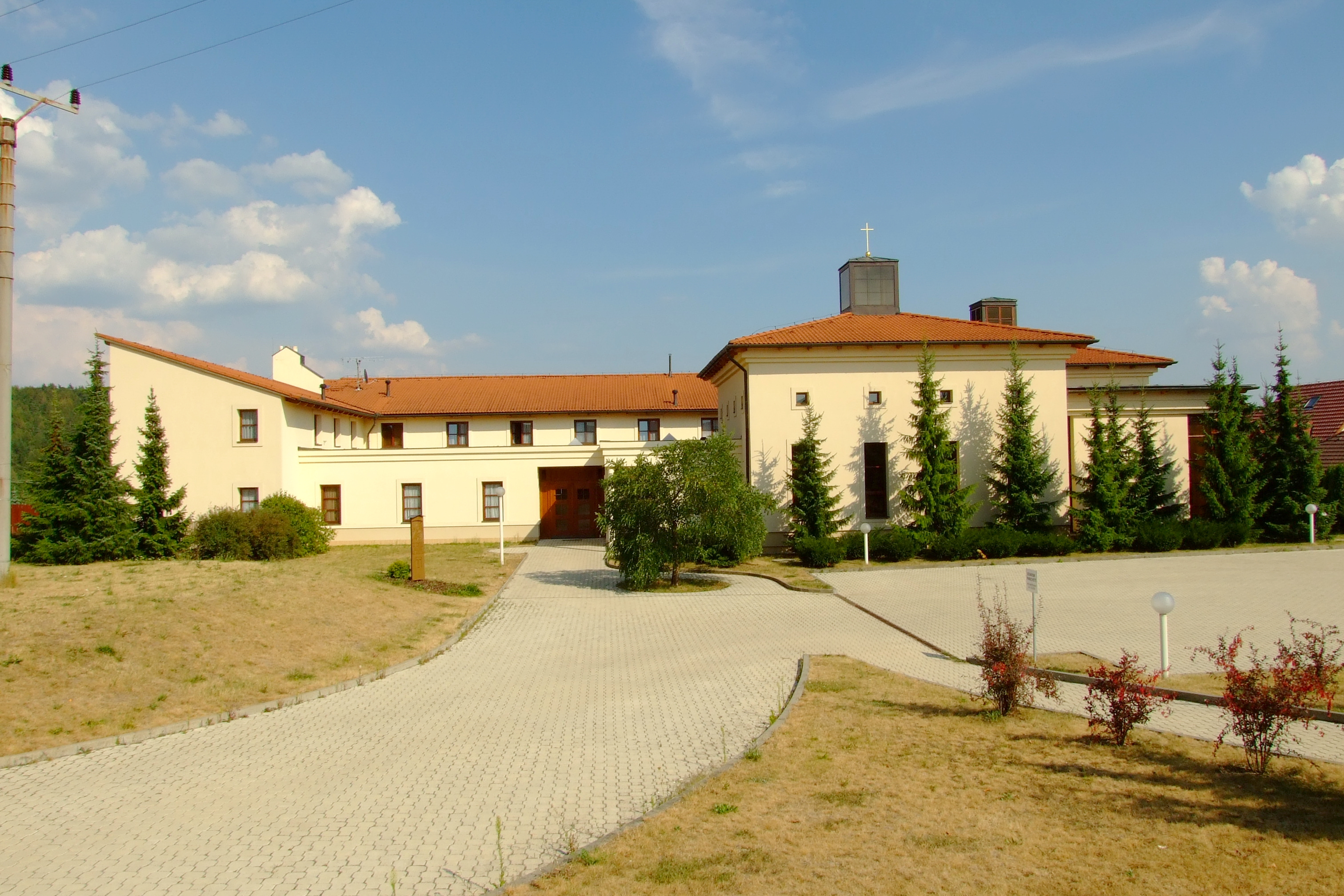
Clarisse Convent with church in Soběšice

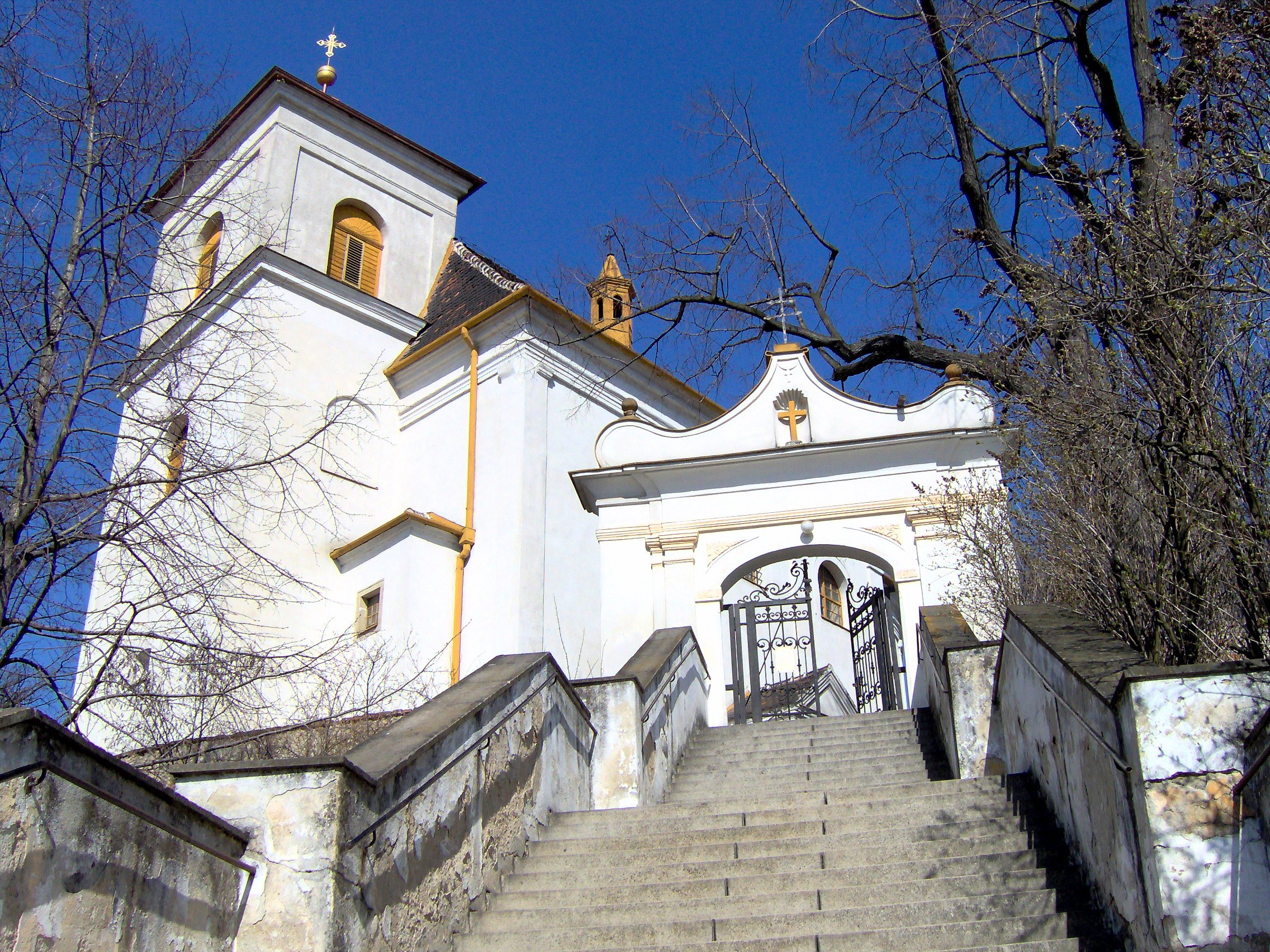
Church in Obřany

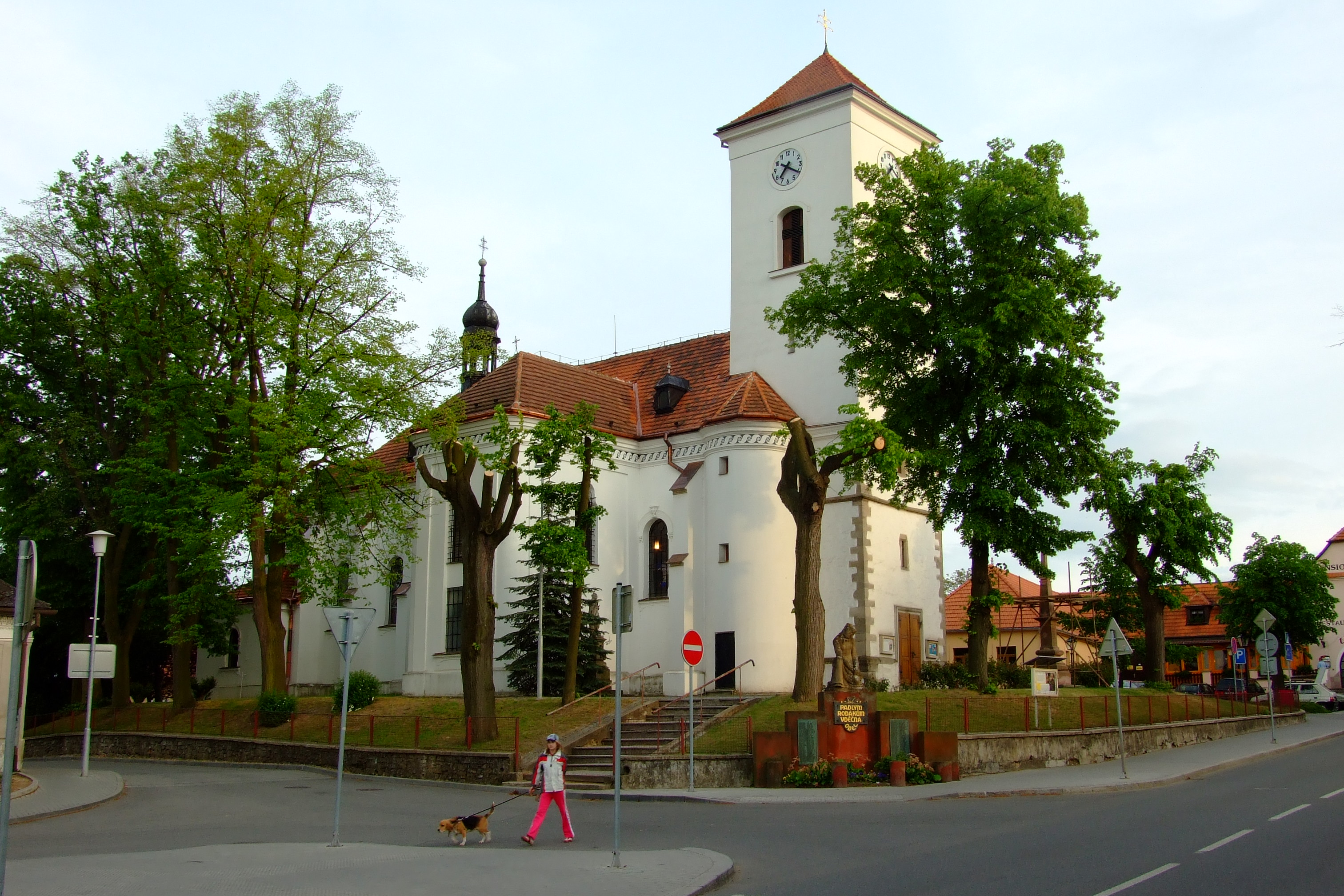
Church in Líšeň

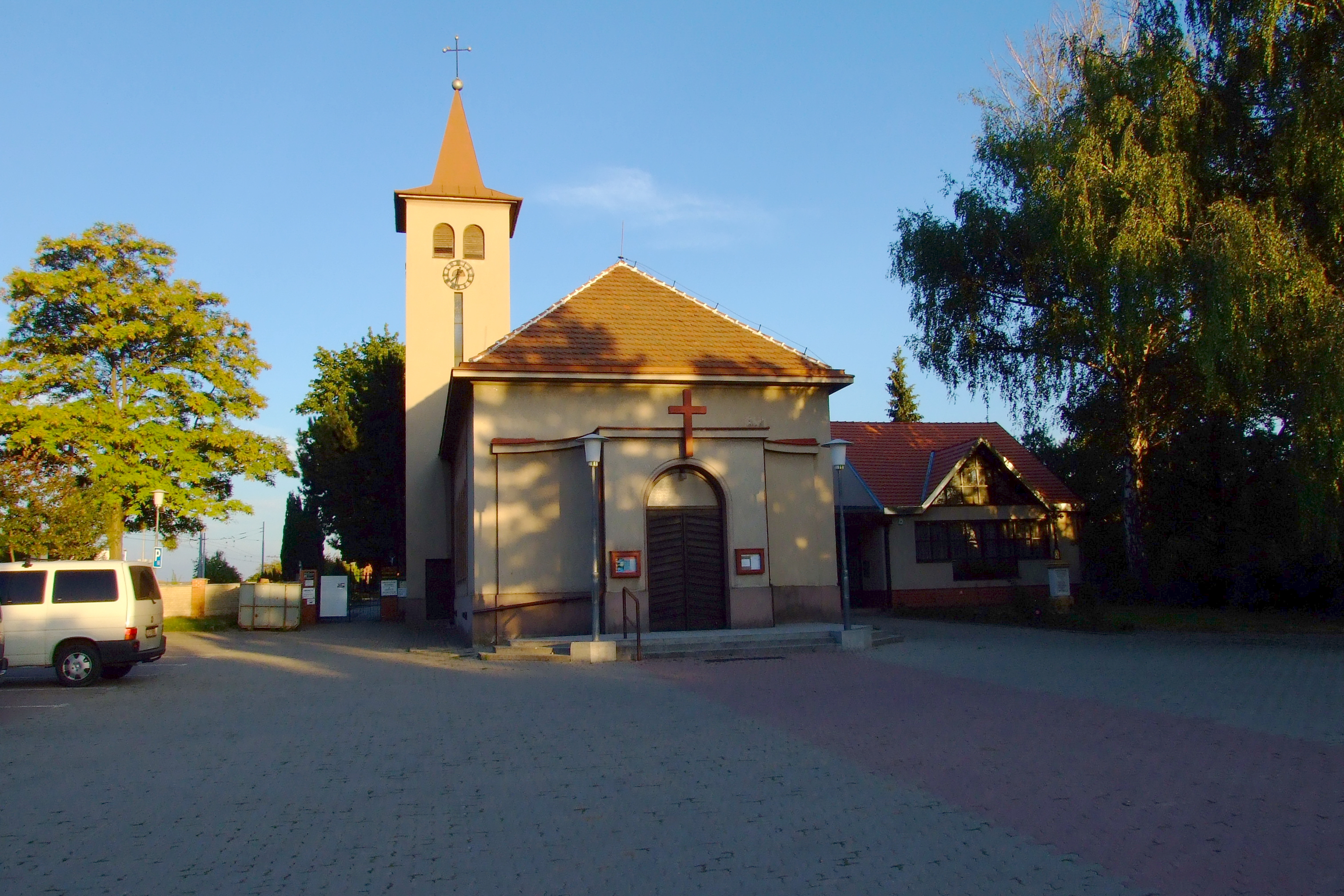
Church in Slatina

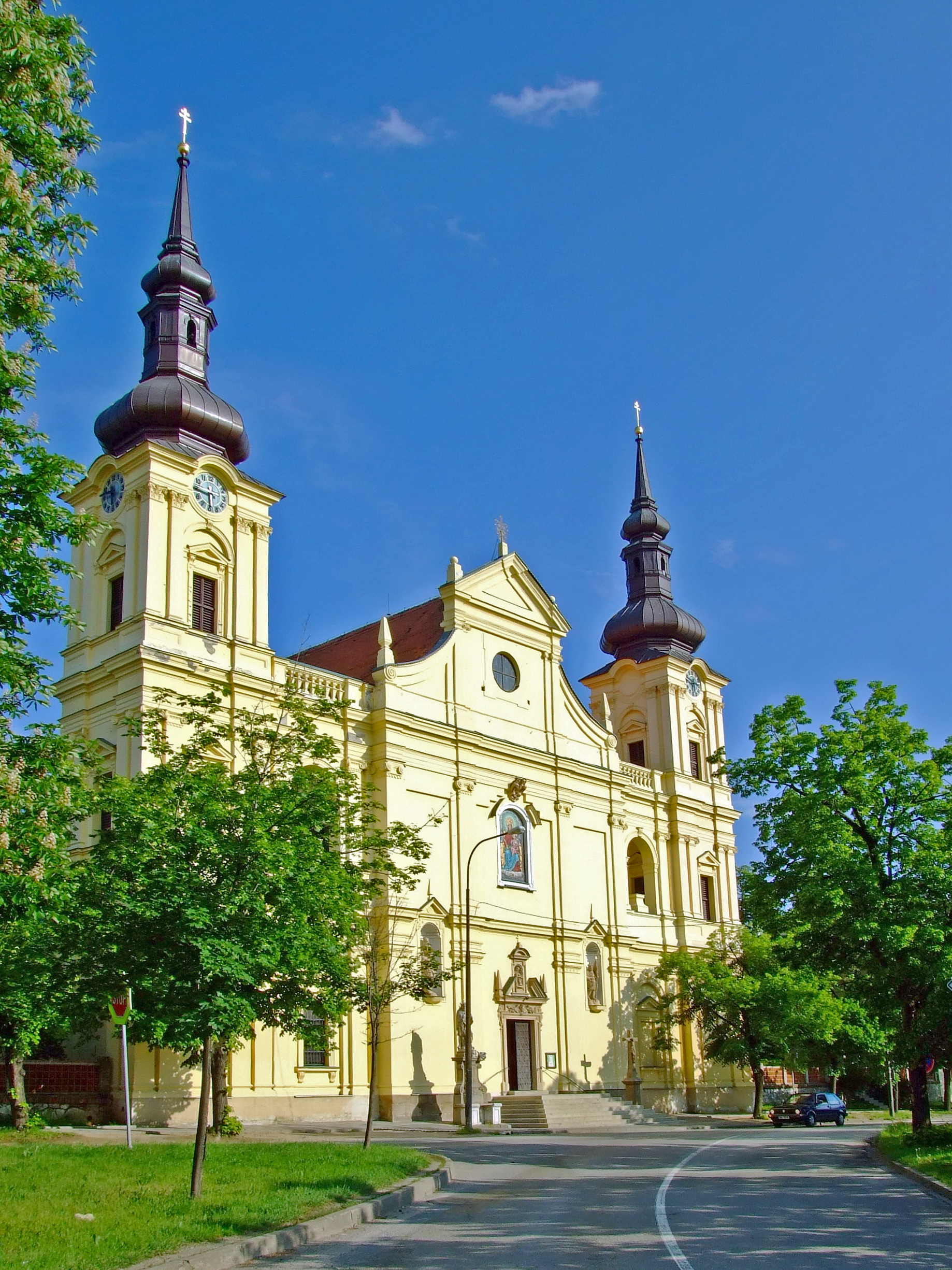
Catholic pilgrim church in Tuřany

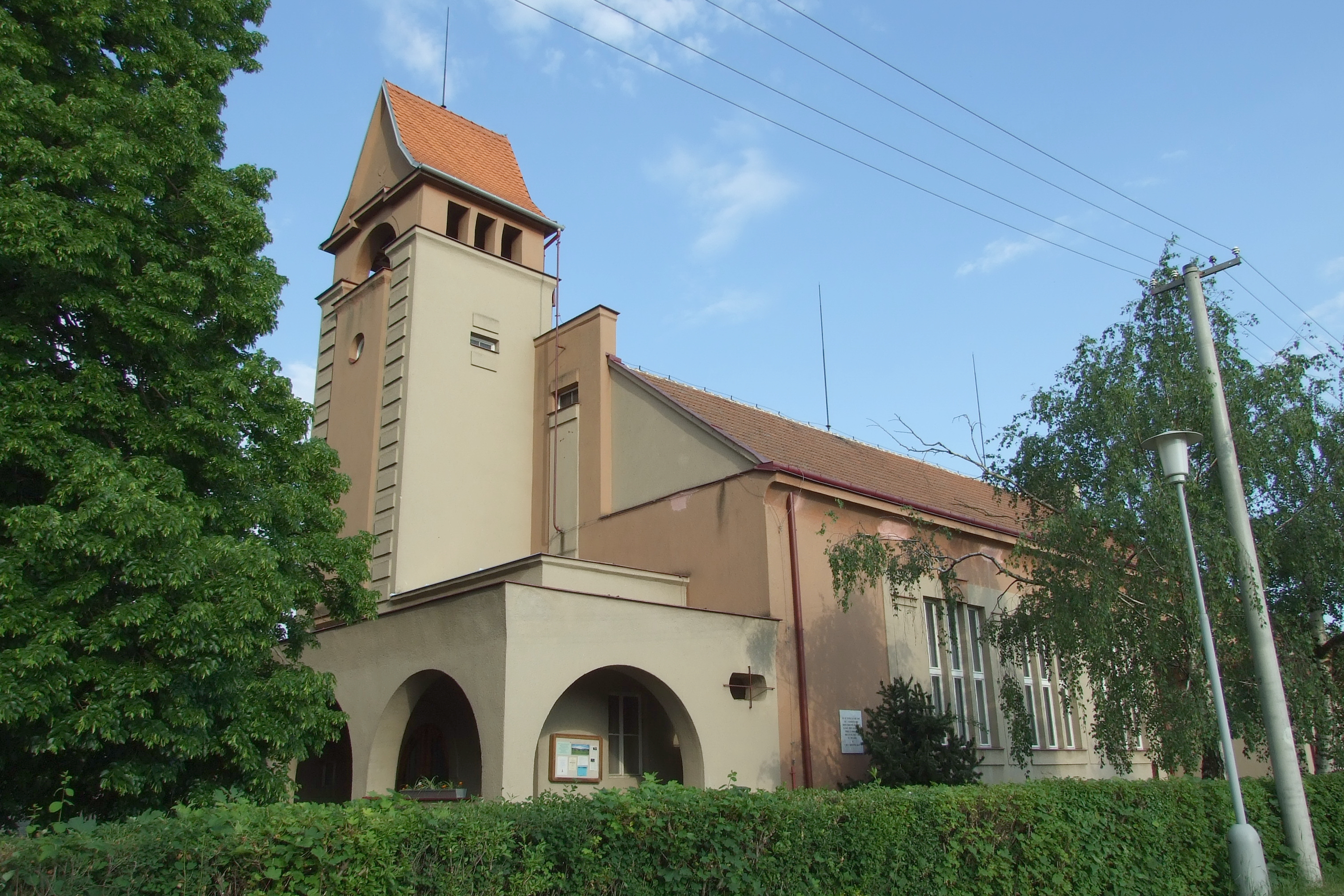
Hussite church in Tuřany
