= Štýřice =

- Cadastral territory of Brno
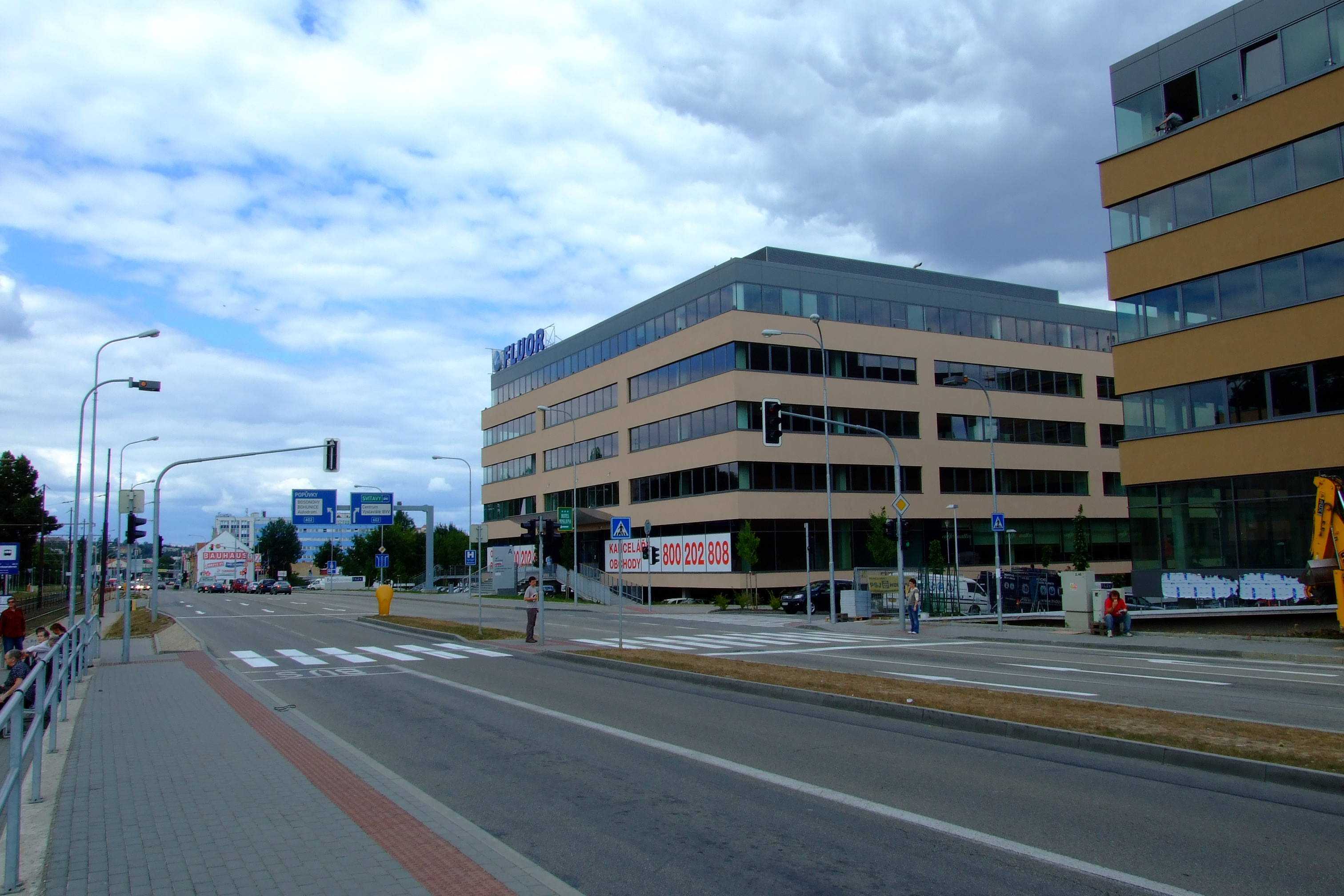
- Vídeňská street

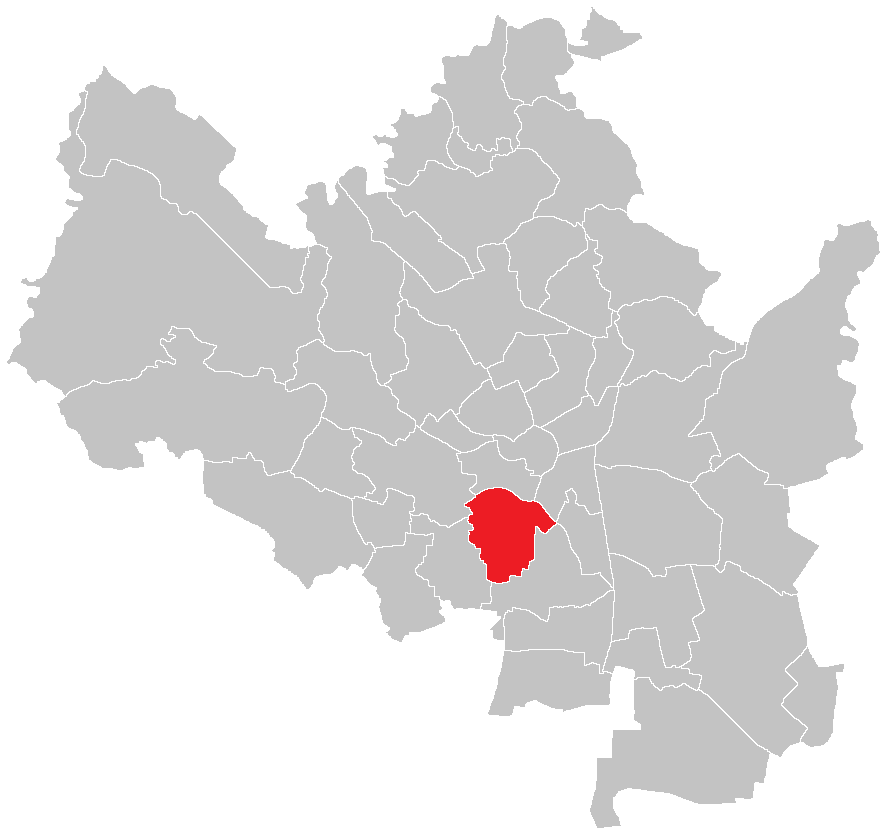
- Location of Štýřice in Brno 49°10′53″N 16°35′42″E
- Country: Czech Republic
- Region: South Moravian Region
- City: Brno
- City district: Brno-střed

Area
  - Total: 3.33 km^{2} (1.29 sq mi)

Population (2021)
  - Total: 8,665
  - Density: 2,600/km^{2} (6,740/sq mi)
- Time zone: UTC+1 (CET)
  - Summer (DST): UTC+2 (CEST)
- Postal code: 639 00

Štyřice is a municipal part and cadastral territory southwest of the center of the Brno, Czech Republic. It has an area of 3.33 km². The territory of modern Štýřice was annexed to Brno in 1850. Since November 24, 1990, Štýřice has been part of the city district of Brno-střed. About 8,600 people live here.

It lies south of the river Svratka.

== History ==
In 2017, during research on Vojtová street, archaeologists discovered the remains of a temporary camp for the Roman legions, which apparently protected the ford over the Svratka for a short time. A moat with a rampart approximately 70 meters long that protected the site and several Roman objects were uncovered. The camp was dated to the years 172–180, i.e. to the period of the Marcomannic Wars.

== Description ==
The axis of Štýřice is represented by Vídeňská street, which is home to a number of large companies and several shops, including a Albert hypermarket. Together with the local Jihlavská and Heršpická streets, it is also an important traffic artery, which is also crossed by tram lines 2 to Modřice and 6 to neighboring Starý Lískovec. The northern part of the district is made up of older buildings, and the central part is a panel housing estate, the construction of which insensitively destroyed a large part of the original buildings. Kamenná kolonie (Stone colony), a former workers' colony of the First Republic, is located in the northwest of Štýřice. The southernmost part of the quarter is occupied by the extensive grounds of the Brno central cemetery. In recent years, Štýřice has been among the most dynamically changing parts of Brno-střed. Modern business parks are being created in the eastern and southern parts, and in the eastern part, large stores of the Bauhaus and Hornbach companies were also built in the recent past, which contrasts greatly with the state that prevailed here until the mid-1990s, when there were undeveloped areas. Štýřice is home to the tallest building not only in Brno, but also in the entire Czech Republic, AZ Tower (111 m).

== Geography ==
In the north, Štýřice is bordered by Staré Brno, in the northeast by Trnitá, in the east by Komárov and mainly by Horní Heršpice, in the southwest and west by Bohunice, and in the northwest by Pisárky.

== Territorial divisions ==
The cadastral territory of Štýřice is further divided into 8 basic settlement units.

Basic settlement unit	Population		
Basic settlement unit	2011	2021	Change
Kamenná	1,499	1,873	+25.0%
Bakalovo nábřeží	906	813	-10.3%
Stráň	121	16	-86.8%
Havlenova	3,555	3,475	-2.3%
Vsetínská	2,494	2,409	-3.4%
Nákladové nádraží	1	40	+3,900.0%
Heršpická	29	39	+34.5%
Ústřední hřbitov	0	0	+0%

== Demographics ==
Historical population
Year	Pop.	±%
1970	14,057	—
1980	11,480	−18.3%
1991	9,190	−19.9%
2001	8,635	−6.0%
2011	8,605	−0.3%
2021	8,665	+0.7%
Source: Censuses

As of the 2021 census, the population is 8,665, up almost 1% from 8,605 in the 2011 census, but still only less than two-thirds of the peak population of 14,057 in 1970.
