= Pisárky =

- Cadastral territory of Brno
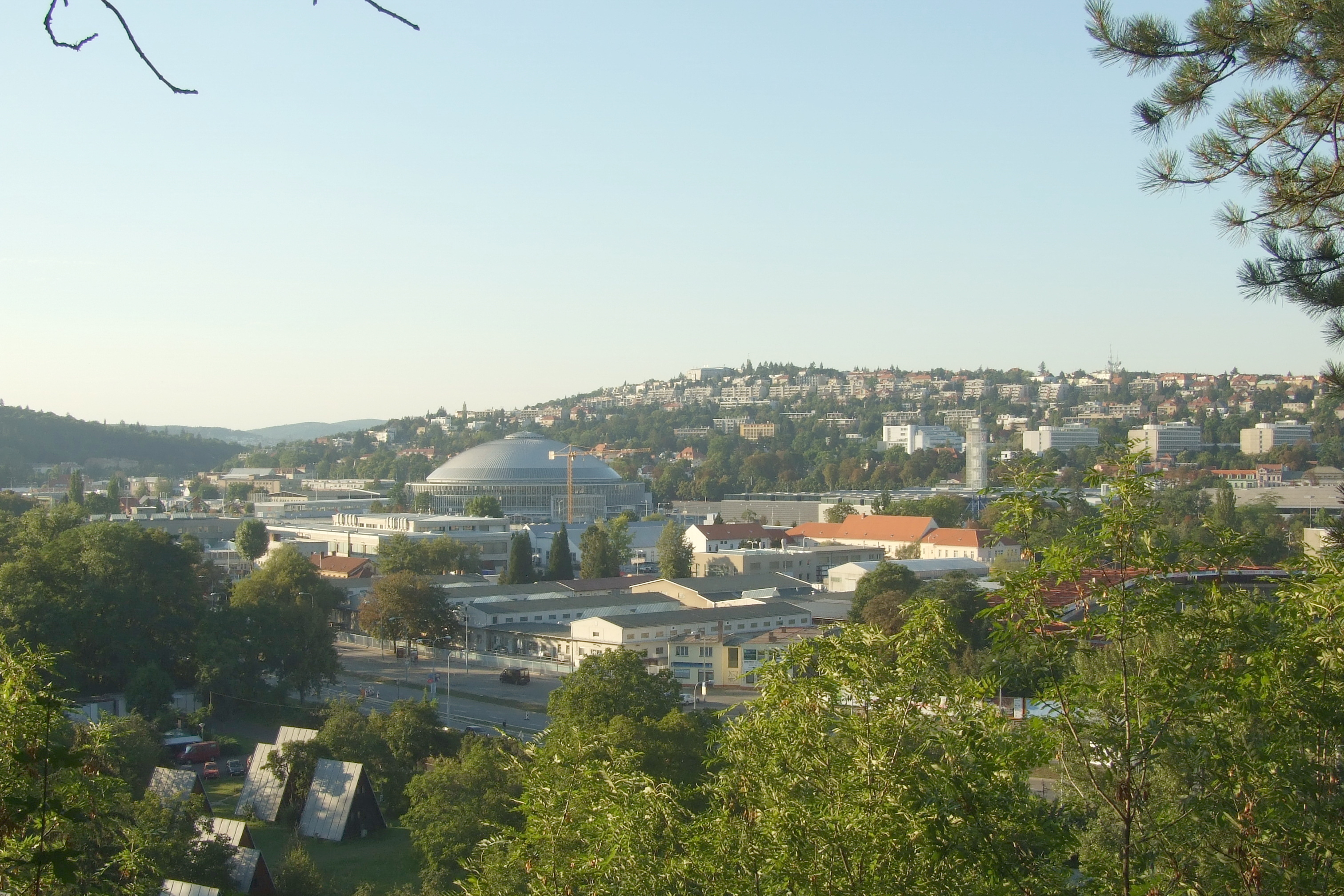
- View of the Brno Exhibition Centre with Pisárky in the background

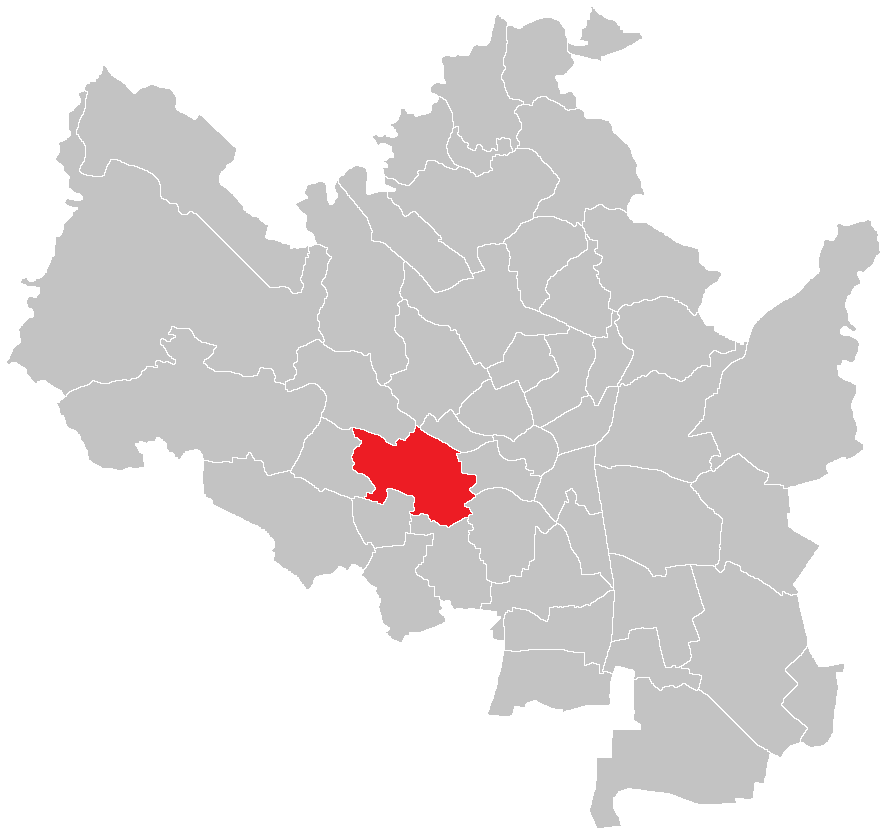
- Location of Pisárky in Brno 49°11′30″N 16°34′38″E
- Country: Czech Republic
- Region: South Moravian Region
- City: Brno
- City district: Brno-střed, Brno-Kohoutovice, Brno-Jundrov

Area
  - Total: 4.67 km^{2} (1.80 sq mi)

Population (2021)
  - Total: 2,606
  - Density: 558/km^{2} (1,450/sq mi)
- Time zone: UTC+1 (CET)
  - Summer (DST): UTC+2 (CEST)
- Postal code: 603 00, 623 00, 634 00, 637 00

Pisárky (German: Schreibwald, Hantec: Šrajbec) is a cadastral territory in Brno, Czech Republic, west of the historical center. It has an area of 4.67 km². The majority of the territory of modern Pisárky was annexed to Brno in 1850. Since November 24, 1990, Pisárky has been divided between the city districts of Brno-střed (most of the area), Brno-Kohoutovice (western part) and Brno-Jundrov (a small part in the northwest) . About 2,600 people live here.

== History ==
Until the 18th century, the area of today's Pisárky was almost devoid of buildings, which until the construction of houses in Hlinky Street consisted originally only of the defunct Kamenný mlýn, which was first mentioned in 1366.

Before 1815, the empire-style Bauer mansion was built in the southwestern part of the area of the later Brno Exhibition Centre. Sugar factory buildings were soon built near it, demolished in 1954. In 1850, the parts of modern Pisárky, which then belonged to the cadastral territory of Staré Brno, were annexed to Brno. In 1892, a small part of Pisárky, including the house at Pisárecká 4 and the vicinity of the adjacent intersection, was added to Brno from Jundrov. In the seventies of the 18th century, the construction of villas began in Veslařská street, then belonging to Jundrov, which culminated here in the eighties of the 18th century. Since the eighties of the 19th century, the central and western part of Hlinky Street has also seen the development of residential housing, which has existed in almost its current form since 1909. In those years, the Hecht villa, which today houses the Consulate General of the Russian Federation, was also on display on this street. In 1919, the rest of the Pisárky cadastral territory was added to Brno.

In the years 1926–1928, the world-famous Brno Exhibition Centre was built in the west of the Pisarecká floodplain near the Bauer mansion, which was heavily damaged during World War II and restored in 1949–1950. In the years 1955–1959, the area of the exhibition center was increased from the original 26 hectares to 54 hectares.

As an independent cadastral territory, Pisárky only emerged during the second cadastral reform of Brno at the end of the sixties of the 20th century. In 1990, their territory was divided between the modern city districts of Brno-Kohoutovice and Brno-střed. On September 1, 1995, based on an agreement with the city district of Brno-Kohoutovice signed on August 25, 1995, the city district of Brno-Jundrov acquired a small part of Pisárky in exchange for a small part of the cadastral territory of Jundrov. On February 12, 2014, a minor change in the border between Pisárky and Bohunice took effect, and at the same time a change in the border of Brno-Bohunice and Brno-střed in Vinohrady Street, when they moved from Bohunice to Pisárky (and thus to Brno-střed) plots with new numbers 2334, 2335, 2336 and 2337, having a total area of 42 m². Until the sixties of the 20th century, these plots of land newly attached to Pisárky belonged to the Staré Brno a Vídeňka cadastral territory. Currently, the implementation of the Pisárky sports-recreational area, which should be located behind the Anthropos Pavilion, is being considered. Its authors are architects from the Brno architectural office A PLUS, who, among other things, are behind the design of the Bohunice University Campus.

== Description ==
In the western part of Pisárky, there is a forest, formerly known as "Pisárky", after which the cadastral territory is named. Since 1928, a significant part of the cadastral territory Pisárky has belonged to the area of the international Brno Exhibition Centre. The Svratka river flows through Pisárky, on the right bank of which there is a wooded slope with a bicycle path passing by the Anthropos Pavilion. The district is also home to the Riviera recreation area and swimming pool, the Holiday Inn hotel, the Consulate General of the Republic of Lithuania, and there is also one of the two tram depots, the Pisárky depot, which also houses the Brno public transport company. There are a number of villas on the north side of Hlinky Street and Veslařská Street. There are a number of family houses in Libušino údolí Street.

== Territorial divisions ==
The cadastral territory of Pisárky is further divided into 10 basic settlement units.

Basic settlement unit	Population		
Basic settlement unit	2011	2021	Change
Vinařská	890	604	-32.1%
Výstaviště	11	115	+945.5%
Neumannova	601	661	+10.0%
Kamenomlýnská	489	450	-8.0%
Libušino údolí	432	481	+11.3%
Anthropos	0	0	+0%
Myslivna	20	11	-45.0%
Červený kopec	95	111	+16.8%
Riviéra	0	1	-
Výšina	103	172	+67.0%

== Demographics ==
Historical population
Year	Pop.	±%
1970	3,434	—
1980	2,734	−20.4%
1991	2,865	+4.8%
2001	2,261	−21.1%
2011	2,641	+16.8%
2021	2,606	−1.3%
Source: Censuses

As of the 2021 census, the population is 2,606, down 1% from 2,641 in the 2011 census. The population peaked at 3,434 in 1970.

== Notable buildings ==
- Anthropos Pavilion
- Brno Exhibition Centre
- Faculty of Economics and Administration of Masaryk University
- Consulate General of the Republic of Lithuania
- Hecht villa
- Reissig villa
- Pisárky tram depot
- Hotel Holiday Inn Brno
- Hošna mansion
- Haas mansion
