= Zábrdovice =

- Cadastral territory of Brno
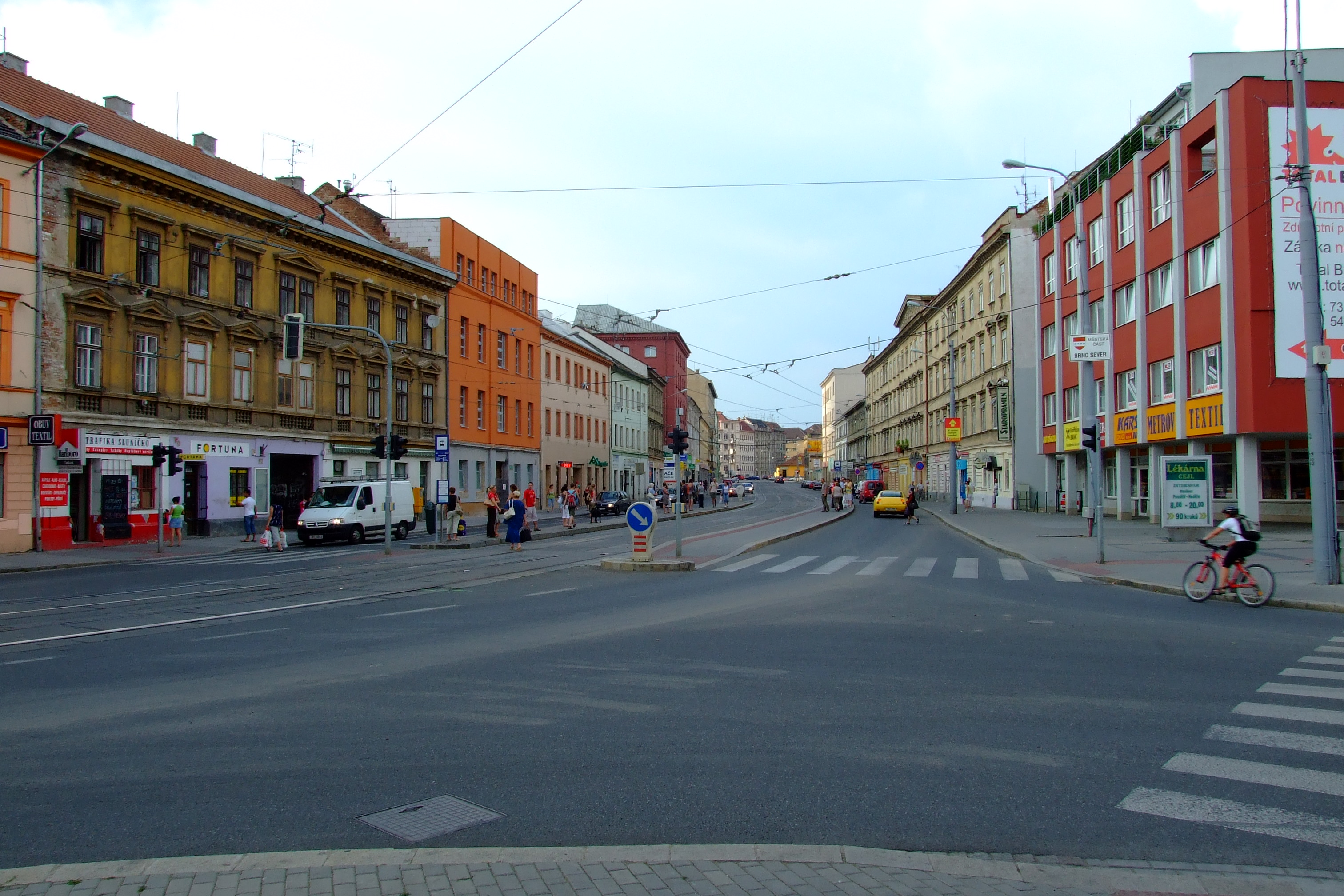
- Cejl street

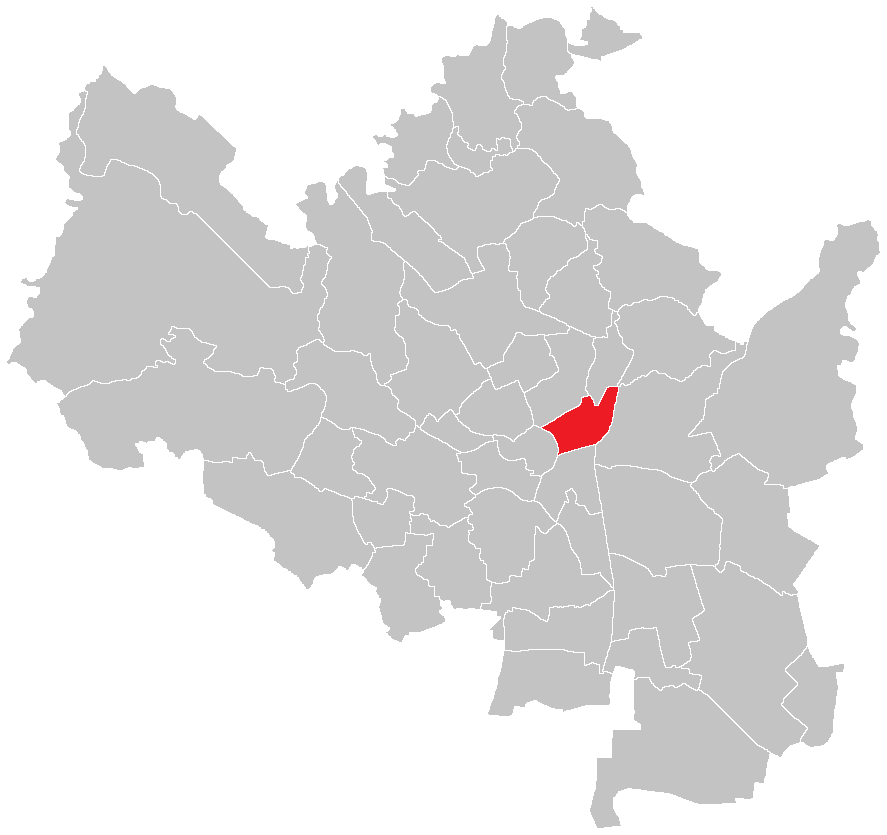
- Location of Zábrdovice in Brno 49°12′8″N 16°37′28″E
- Country: Czech Republic
- Region: South Moravian Region
- City: Brno
- City district: Brno-sever, Brno-střed, Brno-Židenice

Area
  - Total: 1.64 km^{2} (0.63 sq mi)

Population (2021)
  - Total: 12,632
  - Density: 7,700/km^{2} (19,900/sq mi)
- Time zone: UTC+1 (CET)
  - Summer (DST): UTC+2 (CEST)
- Postal code: 602 00, 614 00, 615 00

Zábrdovice (German: Obrowitz) is a cadastral territory northeast of the center of the city of Brno, Czech Republic. It has an area of 1.64 km². Originally an independent village, it was annexed to Brno in 1850. Since November 24, 1990, the territory of Zábrdovice has been divided between the city districts of Brno-střed and Brno-Židenice, and since May 1, 1998, also between Brno-sever. Over 12,000 people live here.

== Etymology ==
The name of its inhabitants zabrdovici was transferred to the settlement - "people (living) behind the hill, i.e. behind the hill". Perhaps the inhabitants of Staré Brno could have given the designation, and that hill could have been Petrov.

== History ==
Zábrdovice itself was originally a village annexed to Brno on July 6, 1850. In the immediate vicinity of the original Zábrdovice, the small village of Radlas has existed since the Middle Ages on the original and current Zábrdovice cadastral territory. Zábrdovice itself consisted of two village settlements, which were separated by the Svitava: smaller buildings on the left bank of the river south of the monastery and larger villages located further west on the right bank of the river. In 1824, in the south of the original Zábrdovice cadastral territory (but on the territory of the modern Trnitá cadastral territory), a new settlement, Olomoucká street, was created to the east of today's Křenová street.

On September 22, 1850, the first manned balloon took off in Brno on Radlas Street (the name derived from the settlement of Radlany, which was established near the Radlín mill on the site of the later street).

Zábrdovice acquired its current area and borders only at the end of the 1960s as a result of the second cadastral reform of Brno. Until then, they had completely different borders. It follows from historical maps that they also originally included the part of the modern Husovice cadastral territory bordered to the north by Svitavská, Nováčková and Dačického streets (originally this street bore the distinctive name "Hraniční"), they also included part of the modern Černá Pole cadastral territory, the northeastern part of Trnitá, several blocks in the northwest of Černovice and the edge of the modern Židenice cadastral territory.

After the end of communist rule, there were two redistributions of the cadastral territory between city districts. Currently, Zábrdovice is divided between the city districts of Brno-střed, Brno-Židenice in 1990, and Brno-sever in 1998. The largest part (0.70 km²) of the Zábrdovice cadastre falls into the Brno-střed district. The eastern part (0.48km²) on the left bank of the Svitava is part of the Brno-Židenice district, and the smaller northern part (0.44km²) belongs to the Brno-sever district.

== Description ==
The district is directly adjacent to the historic core of Brno and therefore has a distinctly urban character with very dense buildings with several streets with high traffic. Historic multi-story residential buildings predominate here, which, however, often show signs of insufficient maintenance.

The axis and at the same time the most important street of the quarter is Cejl Street, which has a number of smaller shops, pubs and restaurants. The administrative buildings of the Brno-Country District Court and the Financial Office Brno I and III are located in the district. The local Albert hypermarket is also located at the intersection of Tkalcovská and Cejl streets, in the premises of the former Vlněna factory, whose building burned down in 2001. The extension of Cejl in the Brno-Židenice part of Zábrdovice is represented by the no less important Zábrdovická street, near which is the site of the Brno Military Hospital, the former Zábrdovice monastery with the Church of the Assumption of the Virgin Mary, the extensive site of the once important Zbrojovka Brno factory, or the famous Zábrdovice municipal spa, or the Brno trauma hospital.

Other streets important for traffic include Francouzská, Vranovská, Jugoslávská, and Merhautova streets forming the northern border of the Zábrdovice cadastral territory. In the central part of Zábrdovice there is also the office of the Brno-sever city district. The last preserved Brno river drive, Svitavský náhon, flows through Zábrdovice. The district is infamous among the residents of Brno for its large Roma community, mainly concentrated on Cejl Street. which is why it is nicknamed the Bronx of Brno. The Museum of Romani Culture is also located in this part.

== Territorial divisions ==
The cadastral territory of Zábrdovice is further divided into 11 basic settlement units.

Basic settlement unit	Population		
Basic settlement unit	2011	2021	Change
Příční	1,831	2,081	+13.7%
Bratislavská	1,043	1,011	-3.1%
Hvězdová	1,114	1,214	+9.0%
Tkalcovská	298	432	+45.0%
Vranovská	2,451	2,734	+11.6%
Špitálka	1,750	1,351	-22.8%
Radlas	74	58	-21.6%
Zábrdovická	1,620	1,665	+2.8%
Svitavská strouha	8	7	-12.5%
Soudní	696	434	-37.6%
Spolková	1,308	1,645	+25.8%

== Demographics ==
Historical population
Year	Pop.	±%
1970	19,353	—
1980	14,155	−26.9%
1991	11,259	−20.5%
2001	11,224	−0.3%
2011	12,193	+8.6%
2021	12,632	+3.6%
Source: Censuses

As of the 2021 census, the population is 12,632, up 3% from 12,193 in the 2011 census. The population peaked at 19,353 in 1970.
