= Stránice =

- Cadastral area of Brno
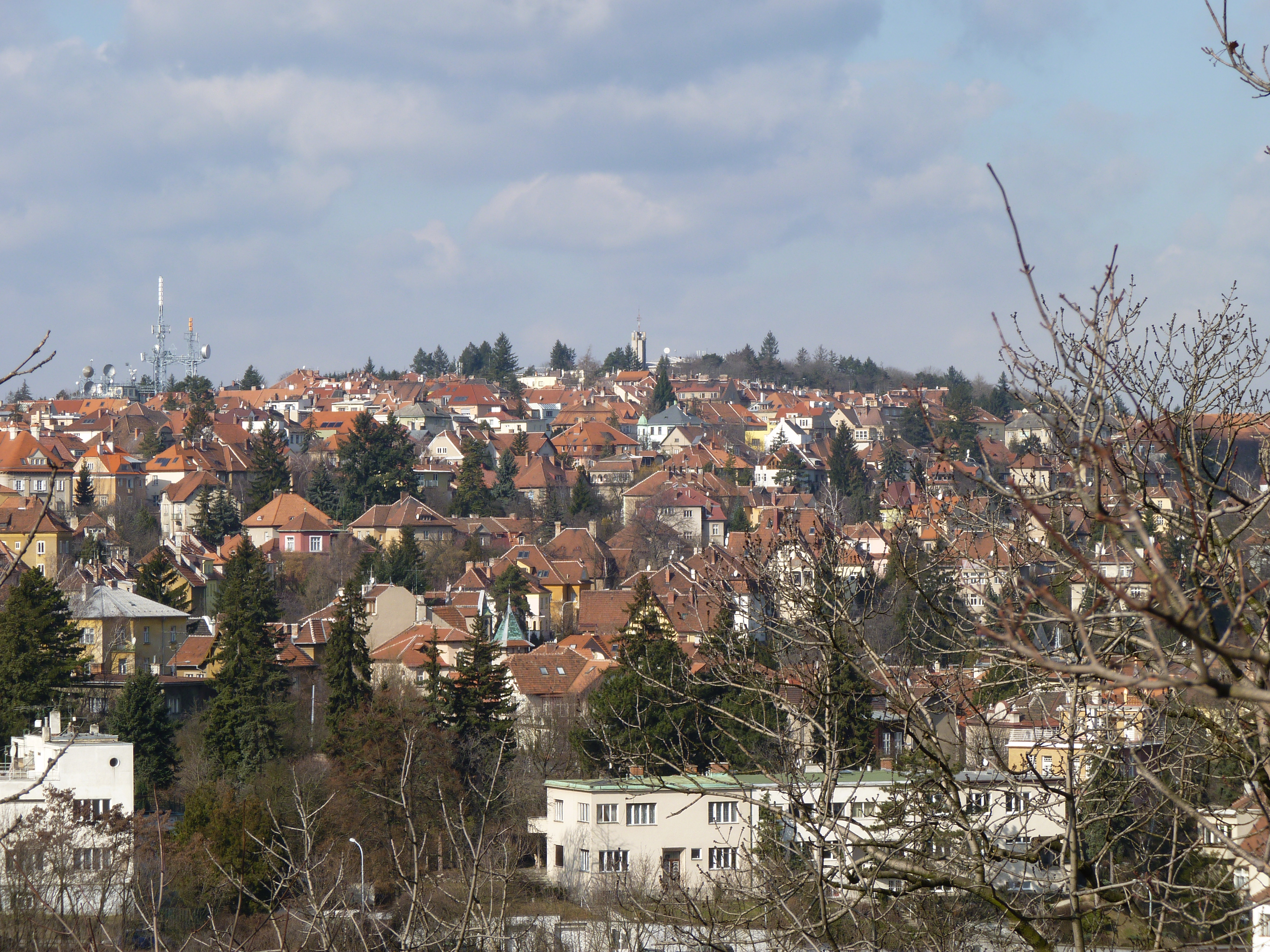
- View of Stránice from Špilberk Castle

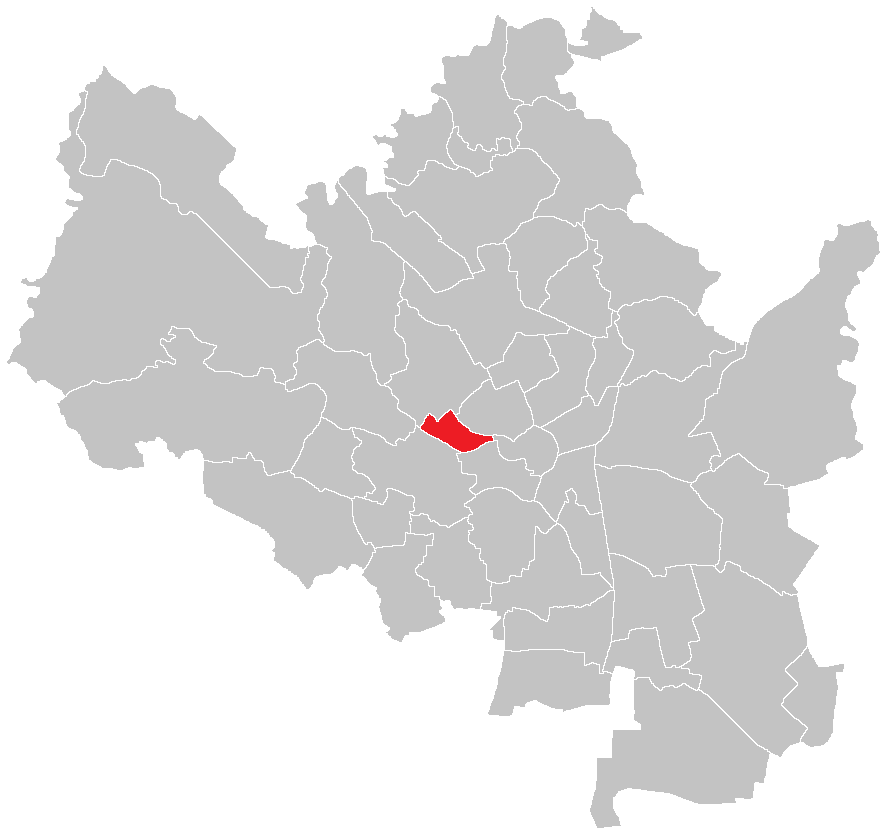
- Location of Stránice in Brno 49°12′4″N 16°34′44″E
- Country: Czech Republic
- Region: South Moravian Region
- District: Brno-City
- City: Brno
- City district: Brno-střed

Area
  - Total: 0.93 km^{2} (0.36 sq mi)

Population (2021)
  - Total: 4,552
  - Density: 4,900/km^{2} (13,000/sq mi)
- Time zone: UTC+1 (CET)
  - Summer (DST): UTC+2 (CEST)
- Postal code: 602 00

Stránice is a cadastral area in Brno-střed, a city district of Brno in the Czech Republic. It has an area of 0.93 km^{2}. Most of the area of modern-day Stránice was annexed to Brno in 1850. Since 24 November 1990, Stránice has been part of Brno-střed. About 4,500 people live here.

The entire area of Stránice, located on the slopes of Žlutý kopec and Kraví hora, is almost exclusively covered by high-quality family and apartment buildings with a number of villas, often surrounded by smaller gardens.

== History ==
Most of the cadastre of the district was annexed to Brno on July 6, 1850, as part of the then Křížová cadastral area, while the western peripheral part (previously belonging to the Žabovřesky cadastral area) on April 16, 1919. The entire area of the district was without any buildings until the 1860s . Modern building activity began here only in the 1890s, before 1918 an office district, later called Masaryk's quarter (Masarykova čtvrť), began to emerge here. Until the extensive cadastral adjustments of Brno, carried out as part of the reambulation, in the second half of the 1960s of the 20th century, the areas of the current Stránice were part of both above-mentioned cadastral areas, while in 1927 and 1939 the border between the two cadastres was adjusted twice. It was only during the aforementioned reambulation that the new cadastral area of Stránice was created, the name of which was chosen fittingly according to the steep slopes that line its borders in many places.

== Geography ==
Stránice borders the cadastral areas of Veveří to the northeast, Brno-město to the east, Staré Brno to the southeast, Pisárky to the southwest, and Žabovřesky to the north and northwest.

The eastern border is formed by Úvoz street, then it turns to the northwest and leads through Údolní, náměstí Míru and Krondlova streets, then it turns in a southwesterly direction to Foustkova street, continues along the edge of Wilson's forest, and then turns to the southeast to Preslova street, continues to the exit along Lipová and Tvrdého streets.

=== Territorial divisions ===
The cadastral area of Stránice is statistically divided into 3 basic settlement units.

Basic settlement unit	Population			Area (km²)	Density
Basic settlement unit	2011	2021	Change	Area (km²)	Density
Náměstí Míru	1,969	1,778	-9.7%	0.28	6,350.0
Rezkova	1,577	1,613	+2.3%	0.34	4,744.1
Vaňkovo náměstí	1,255	1,161	-7.5%	0.30	3,870.0

== Demographics ==
Historical population
Year	Pop.	±%
1970	5,691	—
1980	5,552	−2.4%
1991	5,508	−0.8%
2001	4,896	−11.1%
2011	4,801	−1.9%
2021	4,552	−5.2%
Source: Censuses

The population of Stránice has been declining in every census since 1970.
