= Brno-Kohoutovice =

- City District of Brno
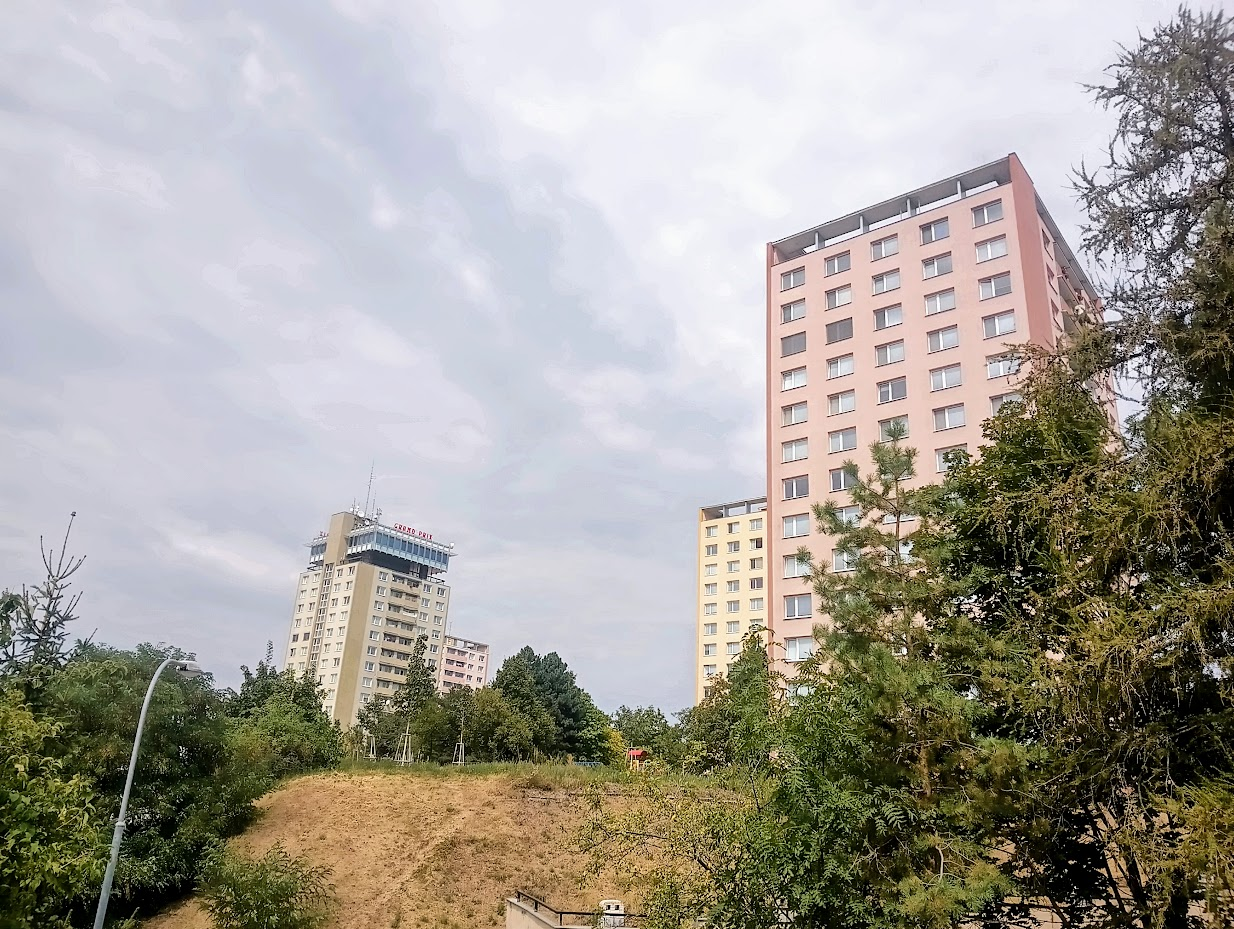
- Housing estate on Stamicova and Voříškova streets. The Grand Prix building can be seen on the left.

- Flag Coat of arms

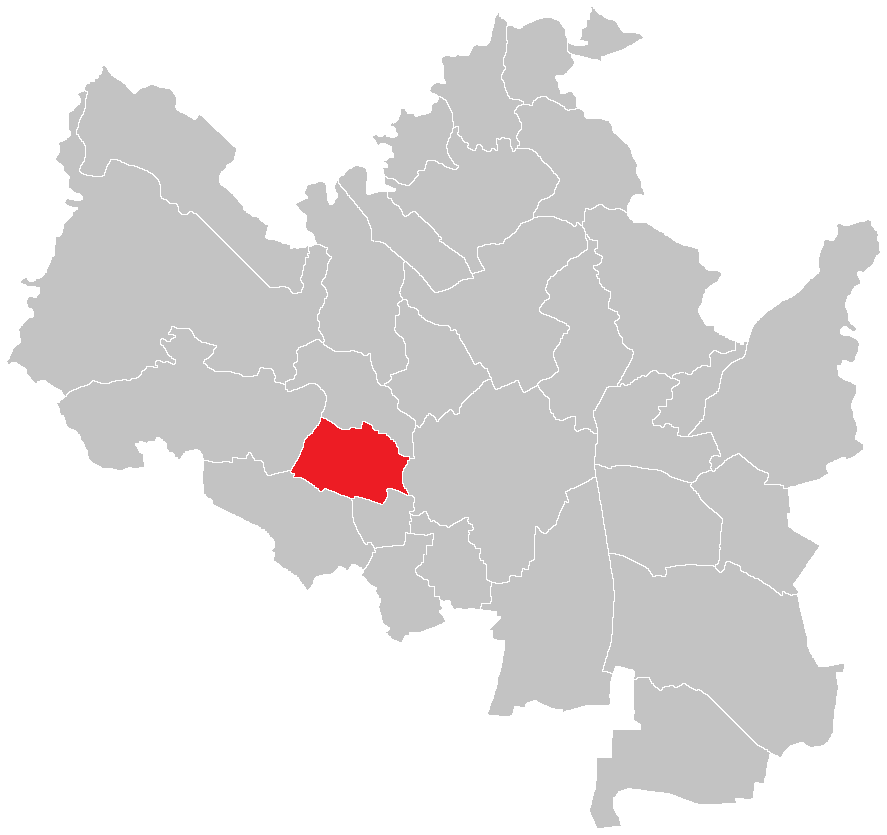
- Location of Brno-Kohoutovice in Brno 49°11′36″N 16°32′13″E
- Country: Czech Republic
- Region: South Moravian Region
- City: Brno

Government
  - Mayor: Jakub Hruška (KDU-ČSL)

Area
  - Total: 4.09 km^{2} (1.58 sq mi)

Population (2021)
  - Total: 12,078
  - Density: 2,950/km^{2} (7,650/sq mi)
- Time zone: UTC+1 (CET)
  - Summer (DST): UTC+2 (CEST)
- Postal code: 623 00, 637 00
- Website: https://www.kohoutovice.brno.cz/

Brno-Kohoutovice is a city district of Brno, Czech Republic, located in the western part of the city. It consists of almost the entire cadastral territory of Kohoutovice, the western part of Pisárky and a small southern part of Jundrov. The total area is 4.09 km^{2}. The city district was established on November 24, 1990. Over 12,000 inhabitants live here.

For the purposes of the senate elections, Brno-Kohoutovice is included in electoral district number 59 of the Brno-City District.

== History ==
The territory of the modern city district of Brno-Kohoutovice originally belonged to the cadastres of five former municipalities, which are Kohoutovice (almost the entire cadastral territory of Kohoutovice and the adjacent part of Pisárky bounded in the north by the streets Libušina třída and Libušino údolí, and in the southeast by the middle of the course of the Kohoutovice stream), Old Brno ( part of Pisárky south of the center of the course of the Kohoutovice stream), Jundrov (the northern part of the local part of Pisárky, and part of the local part of the modern cadastral territory of Jundrov), Bosonohy (houses along Pavlovská Street) and Žebětín (a narrow, almost undeveloped strip of land on the western edge of the modern cadastral Kohoutovice, with the local grove, while the division into these five cadastral territories remained unchanged from 1892 until the radical cadastral reform of Brno in the second half of the 20th century. After the abolition of serfdom, Kohoutovice became an independent municipality in 1850, while neighboring Jundrov was connected with Vinohrádky and Žabovřesky to the unified village of Žabovřesky, to which it belonged until 1868, when it became independent again. For a change, on July 6, 1850, Old Brno was permanently annexed to Brno, in 1892, a small part of the original cadastre of Jundrova was annexed to it on the territory of the current district of Brno-Kohoutovice. In 1854, the village of Kohoutovice was attached to Žebětín, but in 1867 it became independent again. On April 16, 1919, Kohoutovice and Jundrov, together with a number of other suburban municipalities, were permanently annexed to Brno.

Since 1949, Kohoutovice was part of the Brno V municipal district. Since 1957, the cadastral territory of Kohoutovice and the territory roughly identical to the modern Pisárka cadastral territory were part of the Brno I municipal district, while the remaining part of Jundrov belonged to the Brno VII municipal district.

In the second half of the 1960s, during the cadastral reform of Brno, a small eastern part of the cadastral territory of Kohoutovice, the southern part of the cadastral territory of Jundrov and the western part of the cadastral territory of Old Brno were incorporated into the new cadastral territory of Pisárky in the territory of the modern district of Brno-Kohoutovice. In 1979, the northern marginal part of the original cadastre of the then municipality of Bosonohy and the eastern edge of the original cadastre of the then municipality of Žebětín were added to the cadastre of Kohoutovice. On the contrary, Kohoutovice lost the parcel with today's number 2957, which was attached to the Žebětín cadastre.

In the years 1971 to 1990, the cadastral territories of Pisárky and Kohoutovice were part of the Brno I municipal district, while the Jundrov cadastral territory belonged to the Brno II municipal district. On November 24, 1990, the cadastral territory of Kohoutovice and the western part of the cadastral territory of Pisárky became part of the modern self-governing district of Brno-Kohoutovice, and the cadastral territory of Jundrov also became an independent district as the district of Brno-Jundrov. On August 25, 1995, the representatives of both city districts signed an agreement, which changed the border between the two city districts with effect from September 1, 1995. According to this agreement, the city district of Brno-Jundrov acquired a smaller part of Pisárky with buildings on the western side of Veslařská street, while the city district of Brno-Kohoutovice acquired a smaller southern part of the cadastral territory of Jundrov, including garden plots near Mladá Hora.

== Demographics ==
As of the 2021 census, the population is 12,078, down 4% from 12,621 in the 2011 census. The population peaked at 14,339 in 1991.

Historical population

Year	Pop.	±%
1869	310	—
1880	365	+17.7%
1890	458	+25.5%
1900	588	+28.4%
1910	776	+32.0%

Year	Pop.	±%
1921	742	−4.4%
1930	1,089	+46.8%
1950	1,042	−4.3%
1961	1,344	+29.0%
1970	1,893	+40.8%

Year	Pop.	±%
1980	9,615	+407.9%
1991	14,339	+49.1%
2001	13,339	−7.0%
2011	12,621	−5.4%
2021	12,078	−4.3%

Source: Censuses

== Character ==
The surface of the township, which is largely forested, rises slowly from the east. The Kohoutovice stream flows through the town. Most of the local forests are located in the eastern Pisárky part of the city district, however, many forests are also located in the cadastre of the Kohoutovice district itself, whose built-up area is surrounded by them. This district is made up of the lower-lying, relatively small development of the original village, which, due to the highly fragmented terrain, is surrounded by the discontinuous development of the local panel housing estate, which is located mainly on the hills above it. The Pisárky part of the urban area is made up of houses which, with one exception, are located on the northern slope of Antonína Procházky and Libušino údolí streets, and several panel houses adjacent to the northeastern part of the Kohoutovice cadastre on the southern side of Libušino údolí, and then the isolated building of the local hunting lodge located further south. The development of the Jundrov part of the cadastre consists of cottages. The dominant feature of the town, easily visible from many parts of Brno, is the object of the local Kohoutovice reservoir, located in the western part of the Kohoutovice cadastral territory.
