= Brno-střed =

- City district of Brno
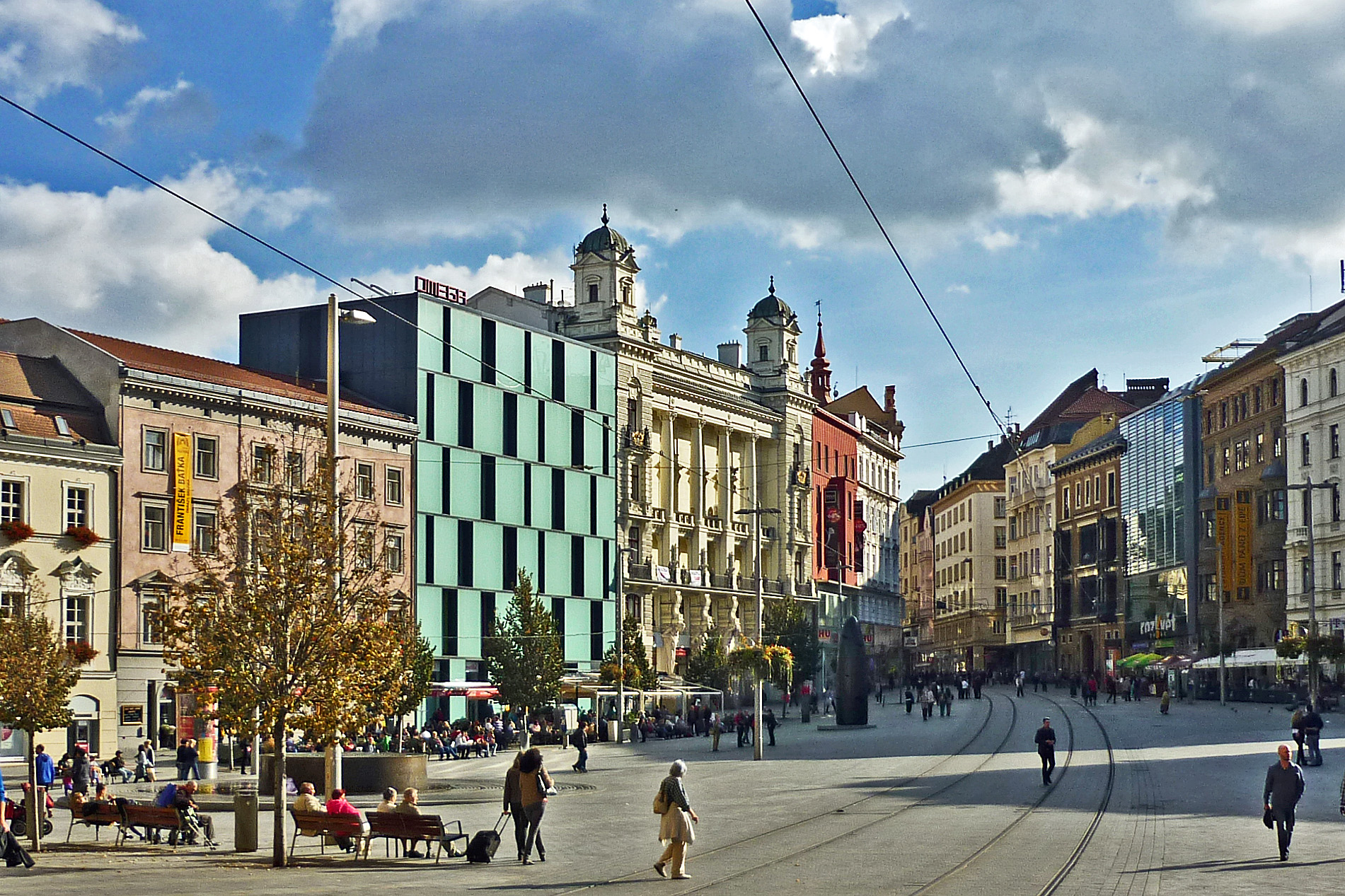
- Náměstí Svobody (Liberty Square)

- Flag Coat of arms

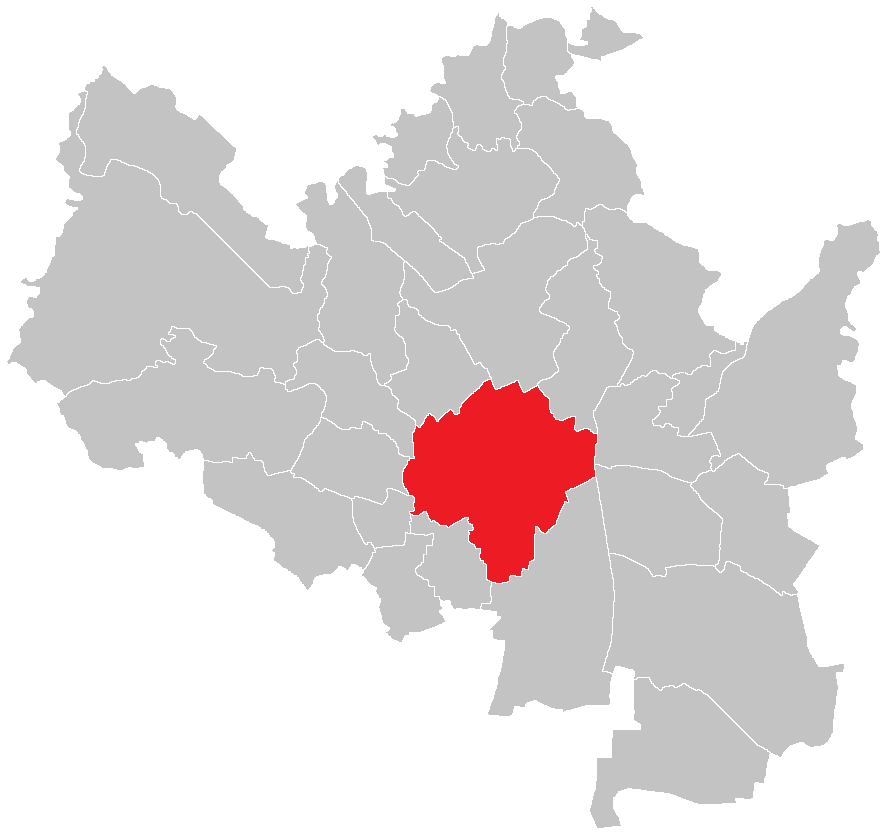
- Location of Brno-střed in Brno 49°11′39″N 16°36′31″E
- Country: Czech Republic
- Region: South Moravian Region
- District: Brno-City
- City: Brno

Government
  - Mayor: Vojtěch Mencl (ODS)

Area
  - Total: 14.64 km^{2} (5.65 sq mi)

Population (2021)
  - Total: 70,857
  - Density: 4,840/km^{2} (12,540/sq mi)
- Time zone: UTC+1 (CET)
  - Summer (DST): UTC+2 (CETCEST)
- Postal code: 602 00, 603 00, 616 00, 634 00, 639 00
- Website: www.brno-stred.cz

Brno-střed (lit. 'Brno-Center') is one of the 29 city districts of Brno, a city in the South Moravian Region of the Czech Republic. It consists of the municipal parts and cadastral areas of Brno-město (the historic center of the city), Staré Brno, Stránice, Štýřice and Veveří and parts of Černá Pole, Pisárky, Trnitá and Zábrdovice. The city district thus overlaps to a certain extent with the area of the city of Brno in the years 1850-1919. The city district was established on November 24, 1990, its office is located in Brno-město. With a population of 70,857, it is the most populated city district of Brno.

The city district of Brno-střed is a relatively disparate whole of a number of neighbourhoods with dense but differently old buildings. In addition to the oldest buildings in Brno in the historic core of Brno, there are also modern high-rise buildings and panel housing estates. The dominant features of the city are the Cathedral of St. Peter and Paul on Petrov hill and Špilberk Castle. The important Lužánky park in Brno and the Central Cemetery in Brno are also located on the territory of the district. Due to its location within Brno and above all to the fact that it also includes the original historical center of the city, Brno-střed is the most important part of Brno and its administrative, economic and cultural center, where a number of offices and institutions, a number of basic, secondary and universities, many companies and shops. It is also an important transport hub.

Most of the city district lies between the rivers Svratka and Svitava. For the purposes of the senate elections, Brno-střed is included in electoral district number 59 of Brno-City District.

== History ==
The oldest documents (charm burial sites) of the Slavic settlement of the modern Brno-střed district come from the modern cadastral territory of Pisárky from the 6th century. The core of the city district is the Brno-město cadastral territory, but the oldest development of the modern city district was already established in the times of the Great Moravian Empire in the territory of modern Staré Brno (lit. 'Old Brno') and in the northern part of Štýřice, which originally also partly belonged to Staré Brno.

In 1641, after the conquest of Olomouc by Swedish troops, Brno became the de facto capital of Moravia, among other things, because the Zemské desky was quickly moved here from Olomouc. However, it was not until 1782 that the Margrave and Emperor Joseph II put an end to the dispute between the two cities, who definitively recognized Brno as the capital city. In 1643 and 1645, Brno was unsuccessfully besieged by the 18,000-strong Swedish army of General Torstenson, who wanted to use Brno as a base for the final attack on Vienna. During the first Swedish siege of Brno, its defenders set fire to the Franciscan monastery under Petrov to prevent the Swedes from possibly using it during the siege of Brno. But the fire also spread to the monastery of the Franciscans of St. Joseph and finally hit the cathedral of St. Peter and Paul, where he destroyed, among other things, the library and archive. The Swedes themselves did not do much damage at that time. Later, Torstenson's army was joined by the ten-thousand-strong army of George II Rákóczi of Transylvania, part of which was soon recalled to Lednice. During this siege, the city was defended by only 1,476 inhabitants, with soldiers making up less than half. However, thanks to the hardness and commitment of the defenders and the brilliant organization of the defense by Jean-Louis Raduit de Souches, the Swedes did not succeed and with eight thousand losses they were forced to end the siege.

In the 18th century, industrial development took place in the area of modern Brno-střed, which led in the last third of the 18th century to the creation of new suburbs: Horní Cejl, Hráze, Jircháře, Josefov, Kožená, Příkop, Silniční. In 1786, by the decision of Joseph II founded in the northeast of today's Brno-střed, in the then cadastral territory of Velká Nová Ulice, the largest park in Brno to date, Lužánky.

On July 6, 1850, the territory of Brno was expanded to include 19 other cadastral territories (Dolní a Horní Cejl, Josefov, Kožená, Křenová, Křížová, Malá Nová Ulice, Náhon, Na Hrázi a Příkop, Nové Sady, Pekařská, Silniční, Staré Brno, Špilberk, Švábka, Trnitá, U Svatá Anny, V Jirchářích, Velká Nová Ulice a Červená and Zábrdovice) and its area increased to 17.32 square km; its extended territory (the so-called Inner Brno) roughly overlapped with the modern city district of Brno-střed. With this expansion, the land of the modern city district began to be connected to Brno, which was completed in 1919. The original city itself, together with the neighboring cadastral territory of Špilberk, became the first of 4 newly established city districts, which were headed by district committees headed by a superior and a deputy. In the years 1859–1864, almost the entire city fortifications of Brno were gradually demolished, of which only short sections, adjacent to the streets of Husova, Bašty, Denisovy Sady and in the courtyard of the Jezuitská 13 house, have been preserved to this day, together with the rebuilt Měnín gate. After the demolition, the construction of a new development began in 1864 in its place, and in addition to it, several parks were created in the northeast of the district. Furthermore, there was a rapid industrial development in Brno. In August 1869, the horse-drawn railway began operation. The year 1873 brought the first university in Brno, the technical institute. In 1881 and 1882, the newly built city theater was the first European theater to be lit with Thomas Edison's electric bulbs, and the very next year, the first Czech bookstore by Josef Barvič was founded. The Brno University of Technology was founded in 1899. Between 1896 and 1916, the district underwent a large-scale redevelopment, which saw the demolition of 238 old houses and other buildings, including the Royal Chapel (demolished in 1908), while the original plan included 429 houses. Reconstruction was preceded in 1870 by the demolition of the church of St. Nicholas on Náměstí Svobody. From the third third of the 19th century, the development of the new neighborhoods of Veveří, Lužánky, Masarykova čtvrť and the development of the suburbs of Křenová, Dolní Cejl and Horní Cejl began to develop in the territory of modern-day Brno-střed. In 1883, the Brno central cemetery was founded on the land originally in Horní Heršpice, whose territory also became the new cadastral territory of Staré Brno II. the part that was separated from the rest of Brno; at the same time, the existing cadastral territory of Staré Brno was renamed to Staré Brno I. In the years 1898 and 1903, the Staré Brno II part of it in connection with the expansion of the cemetery was expanded in the southern direction by other plots originally in Horní Heršpice. According to the indicative sketch of the cadastral territory of Černovice dated 1873, on March 31, 1898, lands in the northwest of the-then municipality of Černovice, which now form the southeast of the city district Brno-střed and the northeast of the neighboring city district of Brno-jih, were annexed to Brno (Hladíkova street, a short section of Mlýnská street and parts of Zvonařka and Masná streets).

On April 16, 1919, Brno was further expanded, after which all land in the modern Brno-střed city district already belonged to Brno. The newly acquired, previously outside Brno, lands of the modern district belonged to the cadastres of the following municipalities: Bohunice, Horní Heršpice, Kamenný Mlýn, Komárov and Žabovřesky. In 1928, the Brno Exhibition Centre was opened, which was later expanded. In the years 1939–1941, an extension of Husova Street was built and its connection with Nádražní Street through the then Denisový Sady area, which also divided this park and thus the Studánka Park was created on the modern cadastral territory of Staré Brno.

Under communism, fundamental urban changes took place in the area of modern Brno-střed, which are mostly understood negatively. These included, for example, the construction of a socialist market on Zelný trh or the reconstruction of Staré Brno in the years 1962-1965, during which, among other things, the last visible parts of Svratecký náhon were filled in, a number of older buildings were demolished, including the former Staré Brno town hall, and the panel housing estate Staré Brno-sever was built. The Janáček Theatre was also built between 1958 and 1965, and the Rondo Hall was completed in 1980. In the 1990s after the end of communism, other construction interventions took place in the district, some of which are considered to be quite controversial - for example, the construction of the Velký Špalíček shopping center or the pseudo-gothic purist reconstruction of Špilberk. At the same time, since the 1990s, a number of buildings that had fallen into disrepair during communism were reconstructed - for example, the House of Lords of Lipá, Petřvald house (today the Orlí shopping gallery), Klein palace, or the municipal court on Šilingrovo náměstí (Šilingrovo Square).

== Neighborhoods ==
The city district is cadastrally divided into 5 cadastral areas (coextensive with municipal parts in Brno), in addition to another 4 which partially lie in other city districts.

Cadastral area	Population (2021)	Area (km²)	Density
Fully in Brno-Střed	56,624	9.11	6,215.6
Brno-město	5,300	1.19	4,453.8
Staré Brno	17,640	1.68	10,500.0
Stránice	4,552	0.93	4,894.6
Štýřice	8,665	3.33	2,602.1
Veveří	20,467	1.98	10,336.9
Partially in Brno-Střed (in italics)	14,233	5.54	2,569.1
Černá Pole	2,304	0.46	5,008.7
Pisárky	1,942	2.89	672.0
Trnitá	4,272	1.48	2,886.5
Zábrdovice	5,715	0.71	8,049.3

== Administration ==
The Constitutional Court, the Office for the Protection of Economic Competition, the Office of the Public Defender of Rights, the Municipality of the City of Brno, the Municipal Court in Brno and the Roman Catholic Diocese of Brno are located in of Brno-město. The regional office of the South Moravian Region is located in Veveří. The Russian Consulate is also located in Pisárky.

== Demographics ==
Historical population
Year	Pop.	±%
1869	73,771	—
1880	82,660	+12.0%
1890	94,462	+14.3%
1900	109,346	+15.8%
1910	125,737	+15.0%
1921	140,576	+11.8%
1930	145,187	+3.3%
1950	144,445	−0.5%
1961	111,180	−23.0%
1970	116,851	+5.1%
1980	91,140	−22.0%
1991	75,857	−16.8%
2001	67,395	−11.2%
2011	64,316	−4.6%
2021	70,857	+10.2%
Source: Censuses

As of the 2021 census, the population is 70,857, of which 51.6% are males, and 48.4% are females. People under 15 years old make up 13.2% of the population, and people over 65 years old make up 15.3%.

Due to the relocation of people into panel housing estates in the communist era, the population of Brno-střed declined by over half after 1950, only rising again after 2011.

=== Foreigners ===
As of the 2021 census, 14.7% of the population was born in another country, and 11.7% has foreign citizenship – 2.4% has Slovak, 2.8% Ukrainian, 0.9% Russian, 0.4% Vietnamese, and 5.3% other citizenship.

=== Languages ===
As of the 2021 census, 81.9% of the population has Czech as their mother tongue, 0.5% Moravian, 3.7% Slovak, 1.5% Russian, 1.8% Ukrainian, 0.4% Vietnamese, and 10.2% other languages.

=== Religion ===
As of the 2021 census, 41.3% of the population is religious, of which 26.7% belong to the Roman Catholic Church, 0.9% to the Czechoslovak Hussite Church, and 1.4% to the Evangelical United Brethren Church, and 43.9% do not belong to a church or religious society. Another 58.7% of the population is irreligious.

== Culture ==
Important cultural institutions, such as the Moravské zemské muzeum, the Moravian Gallery, the Brno City Museum, as well as theatres: Janáček Theatre, Mahen Theatre, Brno City Theatre, HaDivadlo, Reduta Theatre, Husa na provázku Theater, etc., are located in Brno-střed. There is also the Brno Observatory and Planetarium, the Moravian Library and many others.

== Economy ==
Brno-střed is the economic heart of Brno. There are many large, medium and small companies as well as many shops. An important local company is the Brno Fairs and Exhibitions, which have a well-known exhibition center in Pisárky. Among the shops, the Interspar hypermarket on Vídeňská, the Vaňkovka shopping center located between Tesco and the central bus station, as well as the large hobby markets Hornbach and Bauhaus on Heršpická Street are important. A number of banks, such as the Czech National Bank and Komerční banka, have their branches mainly in the central district of Brno-město.

== Transport ==
Due to its location in the center of Brno, Brno-střed is an important transport hub to which not only a number of bus, tram and trolleybus lines of urban public transport, but also a number of national and international bus, rail and freight transport lines go. In the central district of Brno-město, there is the main railway station and the old bus station, from which, for example, connections of the Student Agency depart; on the other hand, in the southeast, the central bus station, from which international bus lines also depart. A significant part of the route of the large city ring road also passes through the territory of the city district.
