= Staré Brno =

- Cadastral territory of Brno
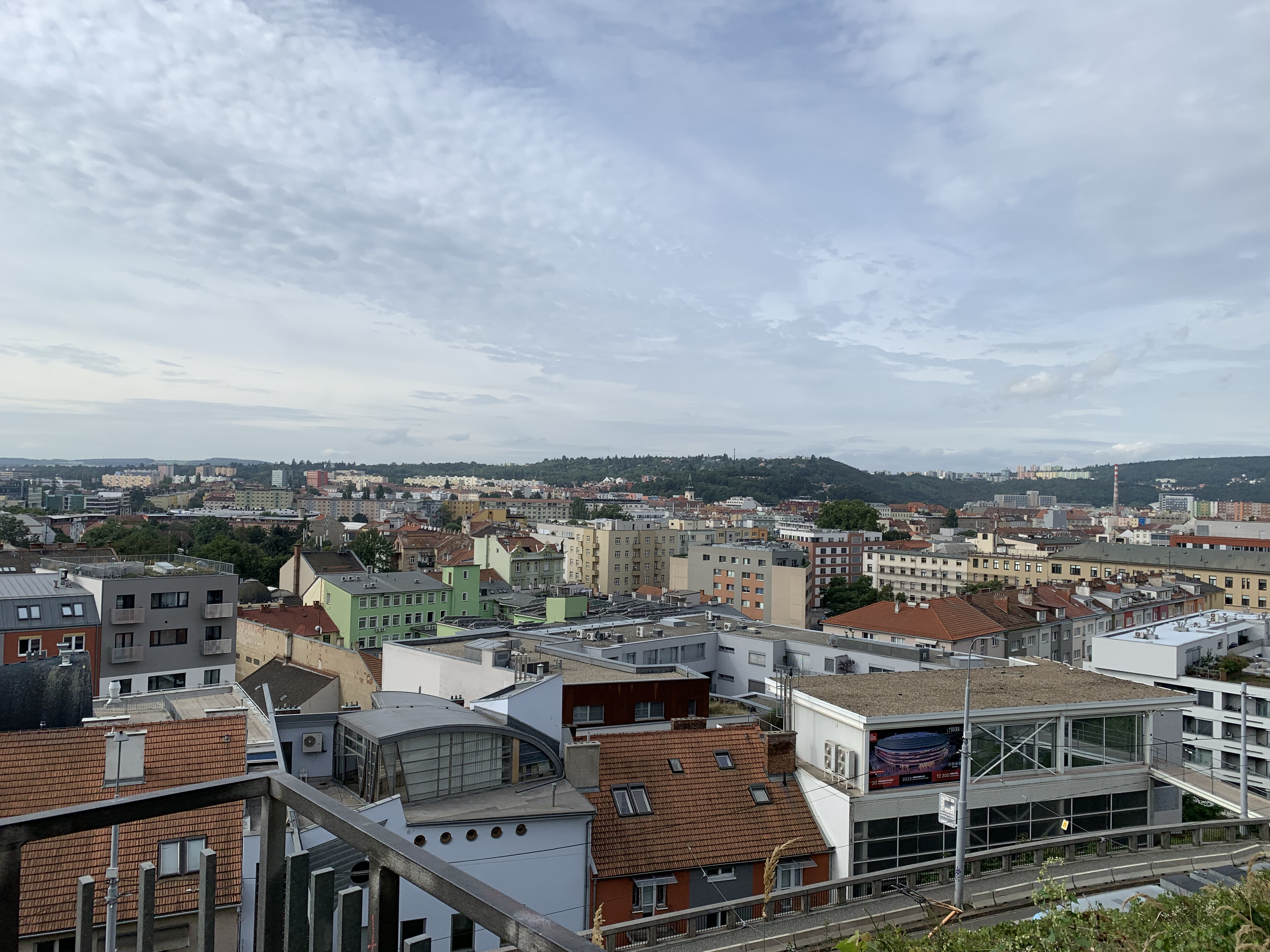
- View of Staré Brno from the Špilberk Castle

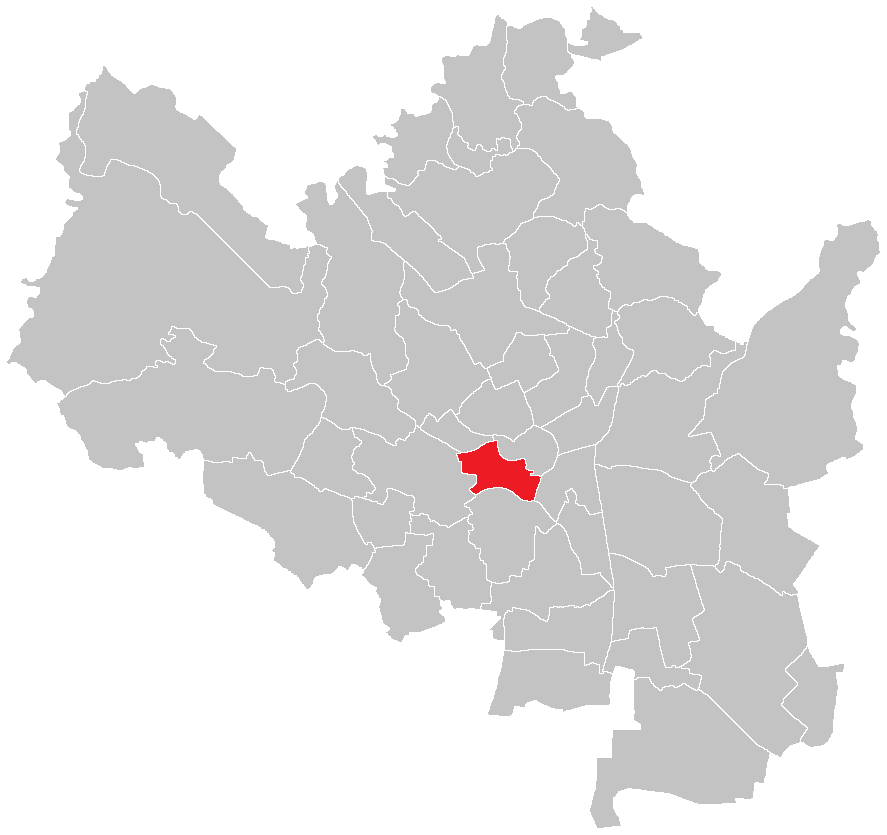
- Location of Staré Brno in Brno 49°11′24″N 16°35′39″E
- Country: Czech Republic
- Region: South Moravian Region
- District: Brno-City
- City: Brno
- City district: Brno-střed
- Established: 1969

Area
  - Total: 1.68 km^{2} (0.65 sq mi)

Population (2021)
  - Total: 17,640
  - Density: 10,500/km^{2} (27,200/sq mi)
- Time zone: UTC+1 (CET)
  - Summer (DST): UTC+2 (CEST)
- Postal code: 602 00, 603 00

Staré Brno (German: Alt-Brünn, Hantec: Oltec, lit. 'Old Brno') is a cadastral territory southwest of the historical center of the city of Brno in the Czech Republic. It has an area of 1.68 km^{2}. Originally a town, it was annexed to Brno in 1850, and since November 24, 1990 it has been part of the city district of Brno-střed. Over 17,000 people live here.

== History ==
Staré Brno was founded around the year 1000 and was probably already a town in the 14th century. It was annexed to Brno on July 6, 1850. Until the 1960s, Staré Brno had significantly different boundaries than it has today. In the past, there were several cadastral territories or parts of them on the territory of today's Staré Brno. In addition to the northeastern part of the original Staré Brno area, it was the entire cadastral territory of V Jircháří, U Svaté Anny, almost the entire cadastral territory of Pekařská and Silniční, half of the cadastral territory of Nové Sady and smaller parts of the cadastral territory of Křížová and Brno-město. However, the original cadastre of Staré Brno, including the core of modern Staré Brno, was much larger than it is today. Apart from parts of the modern cadastral territory, most of Pisárky and about a third of Štýřice belonged to it.

During the second cadastral reform of Brno from 1966 to 1969, the cadastral territory of Staré Brno a Vídeňka was canceled and divided between the renewed but newly defined cadastral territory of Staré Brno and the new cadastral territories of Pisárky and Štýřice. Žlutý kopec (originally part of the canceled Křížová cadastral territory), the area bounded on the west by Náplavka, Křídlovicka and Hybešová streets (originally part of the canceled Nové Sady cadastral territory), almost the entire territory of the Pekařská and Silniční (Hybešova) cadastral territories, which had already been abolished in 1942, became part of the newly defined Staré Brno.

== Geography ==
Staré Brno has a distinctly urban character. The center of Staré Brno is Mendlovo náměstí. The whole district consists of 3-6 storey apartment buildings, shopping centers, there are also restaurants, gaming rooms, shops, etc. Among the most important streets in Staré Brno are Poříčí, Nové Sady, Hybešova, Pekařská, Křížová, Úvoz, Hlinky and Veletržní. The St. Anna hospital, the Masaryk Oncology Institute and the Starobrno brewery are located here. Staré Brno offers the second largest number of monuments of all cadastral territories in Brno, such as the Gothic Staré Brno Monastery with the Basilica of the Assumption of the Virgin Mary, now Augustinian, founded in 1323 by Eliška Rejčka, the Mendel Museum of Masaryk University and the Letohrádek Mitrovských.

Staré Brno borders the cadastral territories of Stránice to the northwest, Brno-město to the northeast, Trnitá to the east, Štýřice to the south, and Pisárky to the west.

== Territorial divisions ==
Staré Brno is further divided into 7 basic settlement units.

Basic settlement unit	Population		
Basic settlement unit	2011	2021	Change
Pekařská	3,400	8,289	+143.8%
Fakultní nemocnice	15	5	-66.7%
Václavská	2,970	3,182	+7.1%
Nové Sady	1,634	1,666	+2.0%
Úvoz	1,150	1,319	+14.7%
Žlutý kopec	495	521	+5.3%
Rybářská	2,595	2,658	+2.4%

== Demographics ==
Historical population
Year	Pop.	±%
1970	22,108	—
1980	17,030	−23.0%
1991	13,883	−18.5%
2001	13,024	−6.2%
2011	12,259	−5.9%
2021	17,640	+43.9%
Source: Censuses

As of the 2021 census, the population is 17,640, up 43% from 12,259 in the 2011 census, making Staré Brno one of the fastest growing cadastral territories of Brno in this period.
