= Trnitá =

- Cadastral territory of Brno
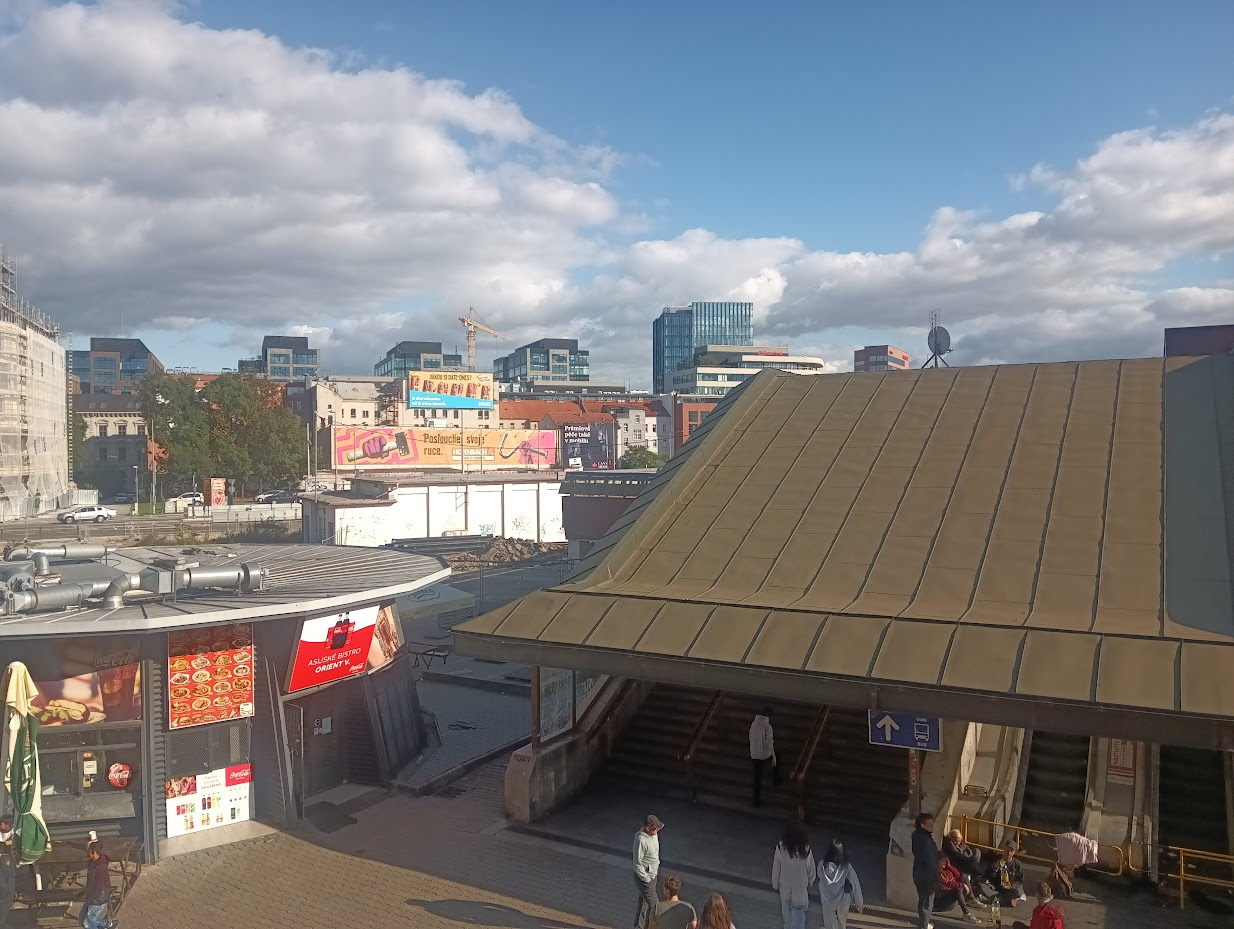
- Vlněna complex in Trnitá, seen from the main railway station

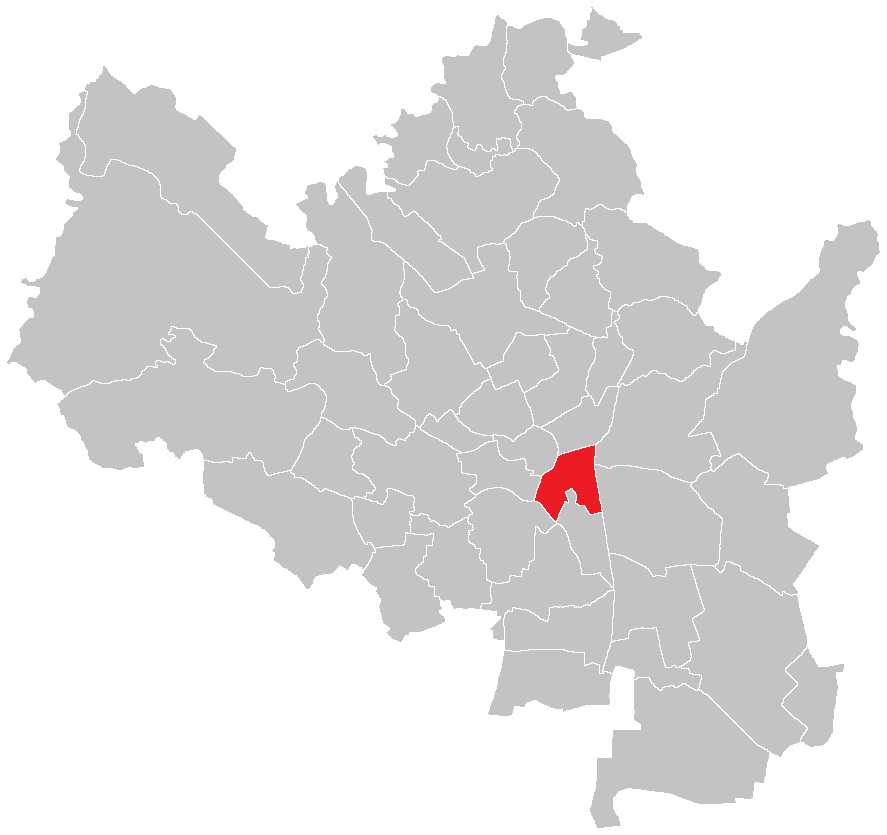
- Location of Trnitá in Brno 49°11′18″N 16°36′59″E
- Country: Czech Republic
- Region: South Moravian Region
- City: Brno
- City district: Brno-střed, Brno-jih

Area
  - Total: 1.90 km^{2} (0.73 sq mi)

Population (2021)
  - Total: 4,429
  - Density: 2,330/km^{2} (6,040/sq mi)
- Time zone: UTC+1 (CET)
  - Summer (DST): UTC+2 (CEST)
- Postal code: 602 00, 617 00

Trnitá is a cadastral territory in Brno, Czech Republic, southeast from the city center. It has an area of 1.90 km². The current district consisted of the territory of several villages, which were annexed to Brno in 1850, and is now has a highly urban character. Since November 24, 1990, most of Trnitá has been part of the city district of Brno-střed, a smaller part falls into the district of Brno-jih. About 4,400 inhabitants live here.

== Etymology ==
The name Trnitá is derived from the name of the former village, formed by the street of the same name.

== History ==
On July 6, 1850, the entire original Trnitá cadastral territory, Nové Sady and the cadastral territory north of the original Trnitá cadastral territory were annexed to Brno. In the years 1854–1856, Rosické nádraží ('Rosice railway station') was built at the southern end of Trnitá Street, from which a link to the main station was built in 1868–1870, along a high embankment (only a small part of it has been preserved due to the recent construction of the Vaňkovka shopping center) . In 1864, the initially small Vaňkovka factory was established between this junction and Trnitá Street. In the years 1883–1886, the Vlárská line was built. The construction of the aforementioned railway corridors marked the end of the development of Trnitá Street, as it became a dead end street. In 1889, the Trnitá cadastral territory was slightly expanded at the expense of Komárov, whose territory it divided into two territorially unrelated parts until 1940. In 1898, the cadastral territory of Trnitá was expanded at the expense of Černovice to the east as far as the left bank of the river Svitava, where part of the border of newly expanded Trnitá and at the same time Brno was formed by the later streets of Eliška Krásnohorská. In the late 19th century, a municipal slaughterhouse area was built primarily on the annexed territory, and in the years 1912–1913 a substation was built on the left bank of the annexed territory, which today houses the Archives of the city of Brno. In 1900, for a change, the Trnitá cadastral territory was slightly reduced in favor of Komárov north of Jeneweinova street, when the border here was moved to the bed of the Svitavský náhon (Svitava mill race). In 1905, the border between Trnitá and Komárov in today's Konopná street was further modified, when the border that had previously passed through the plot of the current house Konopná 12 was moved to the eastern border of this plot, so that it continued to run between the houses Konopná 12 and Konopná 10. North of the house Konopná 12, during this change of the border, it was further straightened. In 1906, Trnitá and Brno were further expanded south of the original area of the city slaughterhouse.

When Greater Brno was created on April 16, 1919, parts of the modern Trnitá cadastral territory were also annexed to Brno.

The western part currently forms the main development zone of Brno, in which a new modern development is to be built in connection with the planned relocation of the Brno main railway station. Its form was determined in more detail by the development company Crestyl at the end of 2019. According to it, it should be completed in 2024.

== Neighboring cadastral territories ==
Trnitá borders Staré Brno in the west, Brno-město in the northwest, Zábrdovice in the north, Židenice and Černovice in the east, Komárov in the south, and Štyřice in the southwest.

== Description ==
Trnitá's entire residential development fell into disrepair during socialism and was demolished during the 1990s and after 2000, has a distinctly urban character, marked by the development of industry in the past, and above all in the times of communism by the insensitive construction of roads, and by neglecting the maintenance and repair of houses. The residential development of the district is currently mainly concentrated around Křenová and Mlýnská streets. The Ponávka river flows through the district from north to south. Along with Šmeral Brno a.s., the district is home to the original site of the Mosilana textile factory, the buildings of several companies that went bankrupt after the Velvet Revolution, but also many small shops, the Tesco department store and the Vaňkovka shopping gallery.

== Territorial divisions ==
The cadastral territory of Trnitá is further subdivided into 6 basic settlement units.

Basic settlement unit	Population		
Basic settlement unit	2011	2021	Change
Skořepka	1,017	1,267	+24.6%
Stavební	1,380	1,275	-7.6%
Masná	1,118	1,298	+16.1%
Jatky	43	157	+265.1%
Přízová	513	395	-23.0%
Rosická	70	37	-47.1%

== Demographics ==
Historical population
Year	Pop.	±%
1961	12,863	—
1970	7,811	−39.3%
1980	5,449	−30.2%
1991	3,783	−30.6%
2001	3,467	−8.4%
2011	4,141	+19.4%
2021	4,429	+7.0%
Source: Censuses

As of the 2021 census, the population is 4,429, up 7% from 4,141 in the 2011 census, but still only about a third of the peak population of 12,863 in 1961.

== Transport ==
Important traffic arteries are Opuštená, Zvonařka, Úzká, Plotní, Dornych, Koliště and Křenová streets. However, especially in Zvonařka and Plotní streets, traffic jams often occur. Transport connections with other parts of Brno are provided by the Transport Company of the City of Brno via tram lines: 8, 9, 10, 12, bus lines: 40, 44, 47, 48, 49, 51, 60, 61, 63, 67, 76, 77, 79, 84, trolleybus lines: 31, 33, and night bus lines: 94, 95, 96, 98. In the southwest of the district, opposite of Vaňkovka, there is the area of the Brno central bus station, from which buses connecting Brno with cities, villages and towns depart not only in the Czech Republic, but also abroad. South of it, at the current border with Komárov, is the site of the Rosické railway station, where the new main station is to be built.
