= Komárov (Brno) =

- Cadastral territory of Brno
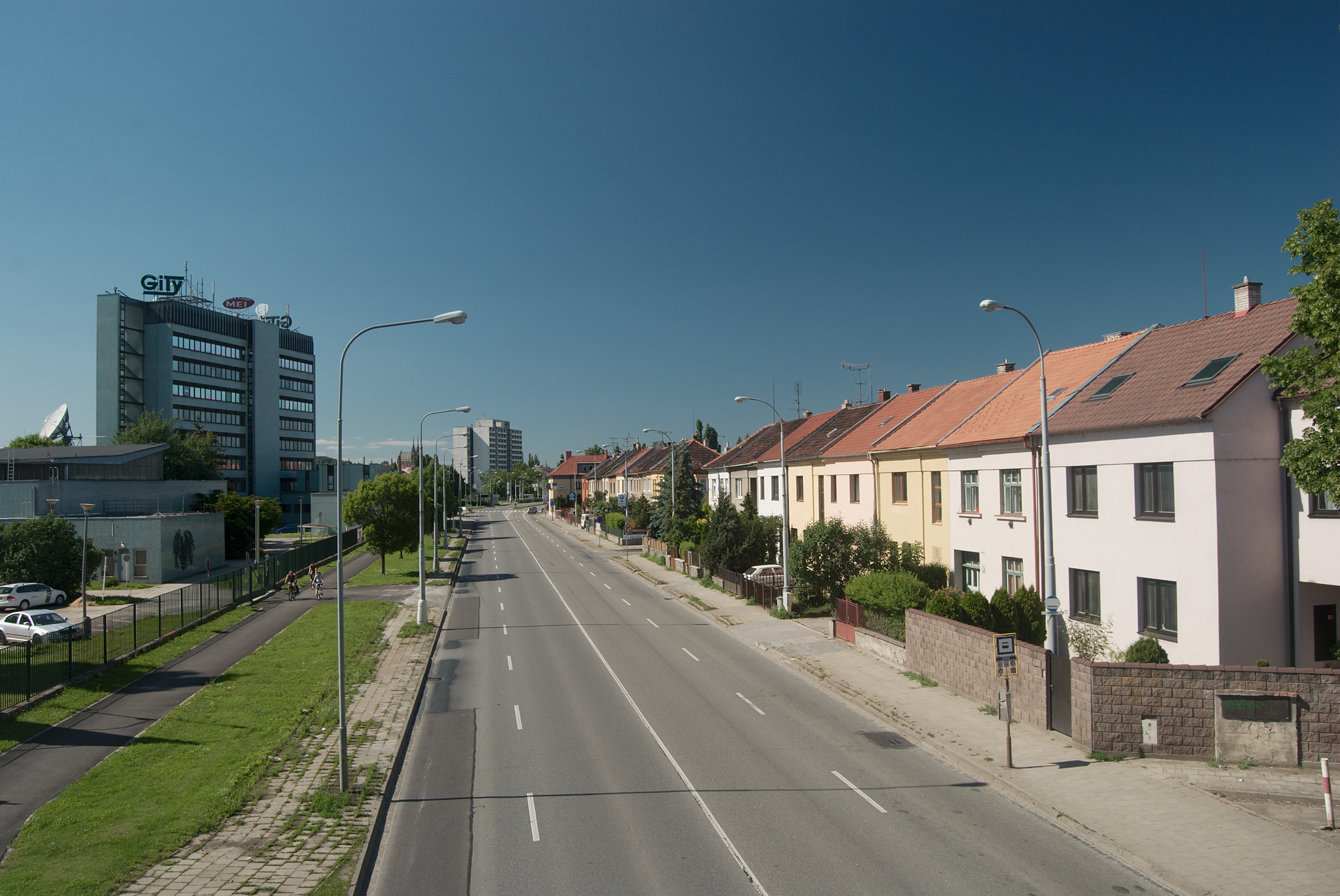
- Central part of Komárov

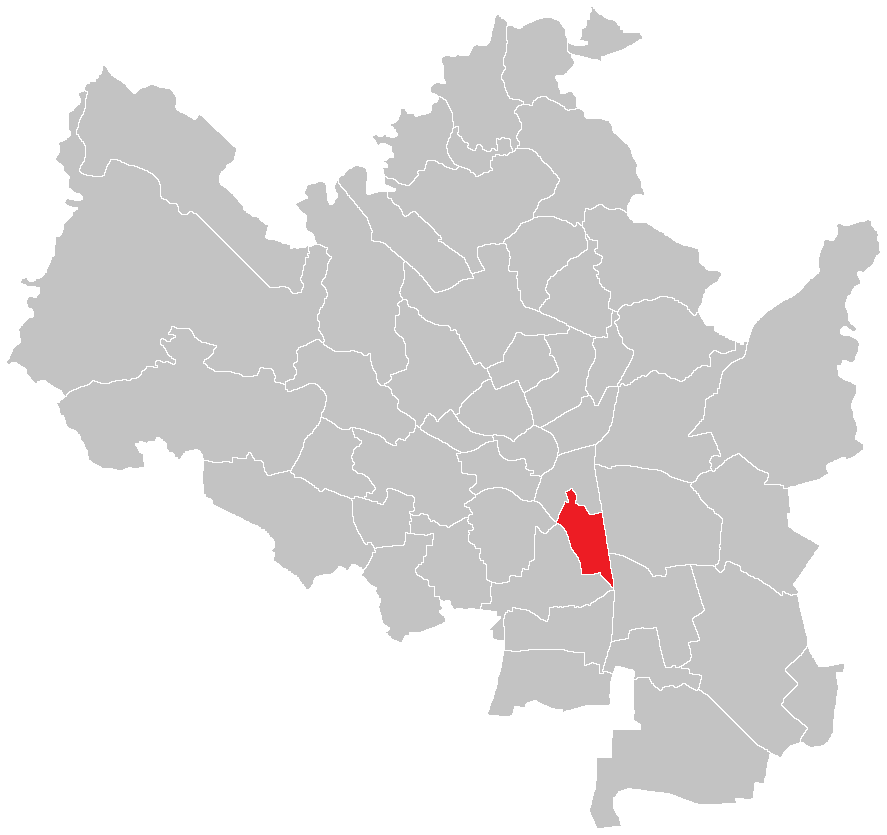
- Location of Komárov in Brno 49°10′31″N 16°37′18″E
- Country: Czech Republic
- Region: South Moravian Region
- City: Brno
- City district: Brno-jih

Area
  - Total: 1.66 km^{2} (0.64 sq mi)

Population (2021)
  - Total: 4,988
  - Density: 3,000/km^{2} (7,780/sq mi)
- Time zone: UTC+1 (CET)
  - Summer (DST): UTC+2 (CEST)
- Postal code: 617 00

Komárov (German: Kumrowitz, Hantec: Komec) is a municipal part and cadastral territory in the south part of Brno, Czech Republic. It has an area of 1.66 km². Originally an independent municipality, it was annexed to Brno in 1919, since November 24, 1990 it has been part of the city district of Brno-jih. About 5,000 people live here.

It lies between Svratka and Svitava.

== History ==
The area of today's Komárov was annexed to Brno in two phases: on July 6, 1850, the territory originally belonging to Trnitá; and on April 16, 1919, on the basis of Act No. 213/1919 Coll., "on the merger of neighboring municipalities with Brno", the municipality of Komárov (including the former municipalities of Malá Mariacela and Petrohradská ulice) followed suit, as well as other parts of the modern cadastral territory.

== Description ==
Komárov has an urban character, and as a district it was marked both by the development of industry and, in communist times, by the insensitive construction of a panel housing estate and roads on its territory. Nevertheless, even here you can find quality family housing surrounded by greenery. In recent years, a number of new shops have sprung up along Hněvkovského street, south of the railway line passing through Komárov.

== Territorial divisions ==
The cadastral territory of Komárov is further divided into 6 basic settlement units.

Basic settlement unit	Population		
Basic settlement unit	2011	2021	Change
Brněnská	3,279	2,706	-17.5%
Černovické nábřeží	3	0	-100%
Klášterského	443	364	-17.8%
Komárovská	347	390	+12.4%
Mariánské náměstí	1,705	1,499	-12.1%
Hněvkovského	324	29	-91.1%

== Demographics ==
Historical population

Year	Pop.	±%
1869	1,644	—
1880	1,893	+15.1%
1890	2,392	+26.4%
1900	2,592	+8.4%
1910	2,726	+5.2%

Year	Pop.	±%
1921	2,799	+2.7%
1930	3,851	+37.6%
1950	4,108	+6.7%
1961	4,205	+2.4%
1970	4,874	+15.9%

Year	Pop.	±%
1980	3,494	−28.3%
1991	4,918	+40.8%
2001	5,175	+5.2%
2011	6,101	+17.9%
2021	4,988	−18.2%

Source: Censuses

== Transport ==
Since the 1980s, important and highly frequented roads have passed through Černovická, Svatopetrská and Hněvkovského streets, which sometimes cause traffic jams. The connection to the center of Brno is provided by the public transport company of Brno. However, there is also the intercity circular route 509 from Měnín and route 109 from Zvonařka to Hodonín. Komárov is also served by public transport. Tram number 12 from Komárov through the center to Technologický park has a loop here. Bus lines 40, 48, 49 stop at the same stop. They connect Komárov with the surrounding villages. Line 50 connects Komárov with Bystrc and the north of the city, line 64 Komárov with Maloměřice and line 67 Komárov with Jundrov and the Avion shopping center.

Line 63 connects Komárov with the other southern parts of the city: Štýřice and Tuřany. Night transport lines N94 and N95 replace these lines at night. The first line N94 goes from Bílovice nad Svitavou through the city center, via Komárov to Modřice. The second line N95 connects Kamenný vrch with the center via Komárov and then goes outside the city to Sokolnice and Újezd u Brna.
