= Brno-město (cadastral territory) =

- Cadastral area of Brno
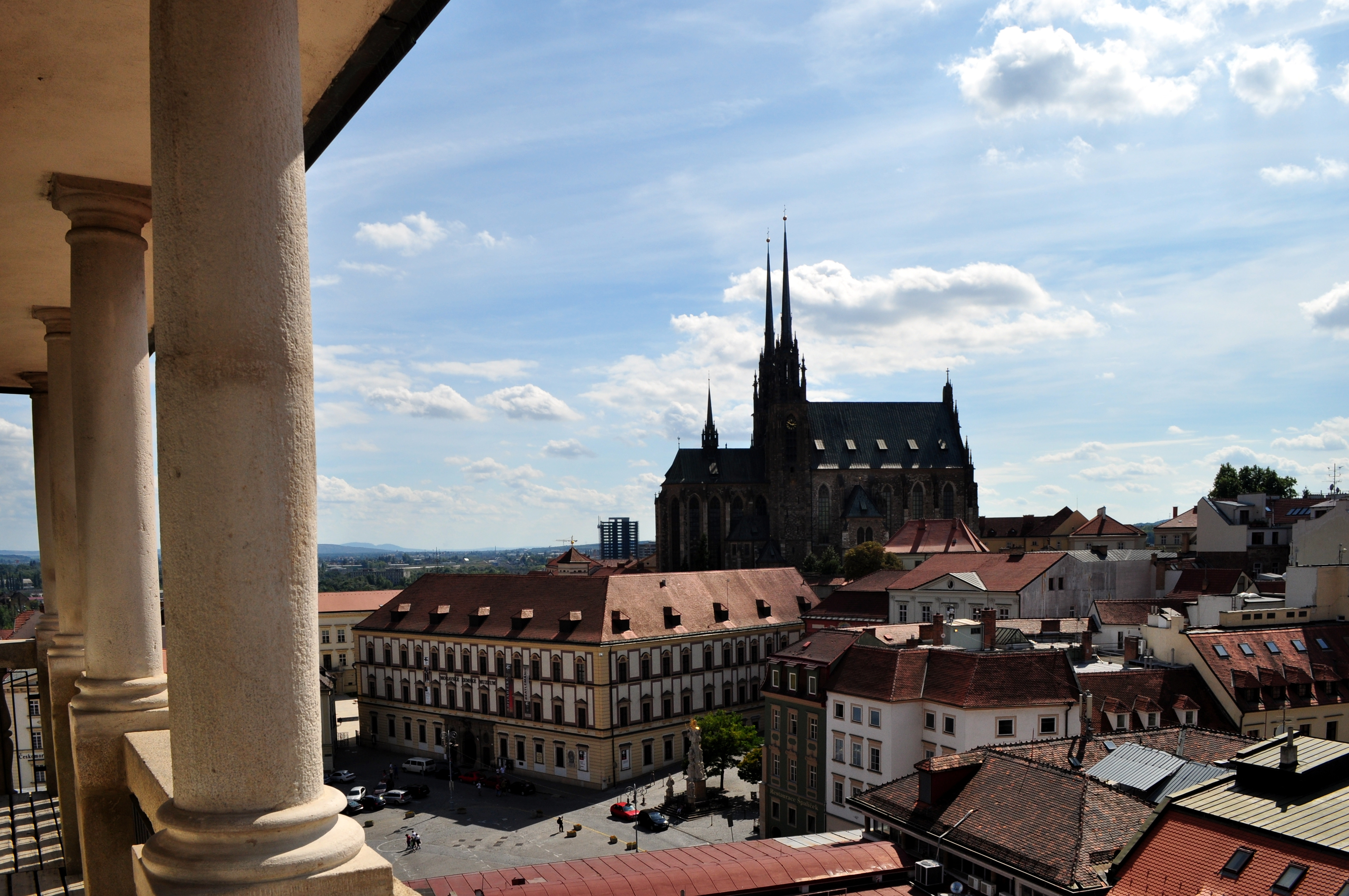
- View of the Cathedral of St. Peter and Paul and Dietrichstein Palace

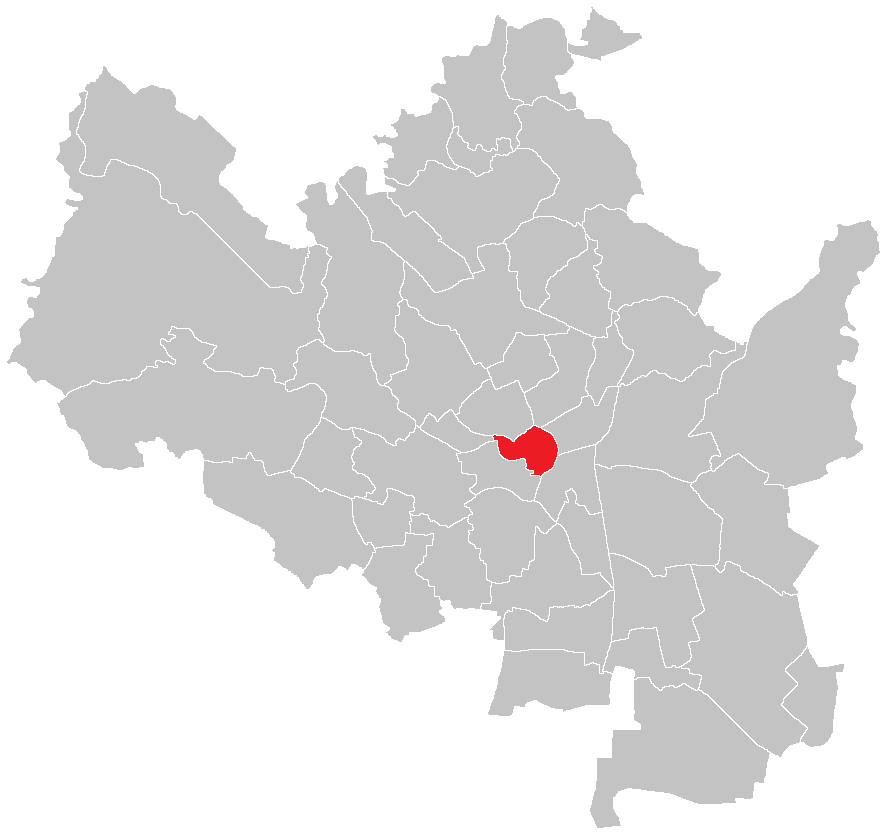
- Location of Brno-město in Brno 49°11′43″N 16°36′30″E
- Country: Czech Republic
- Region: South Moravian Region
- District: Brno-City
- City: Brno
- City district: Brno-střed

Area
  - Total: 1.19 km^{2} (0.46 sq mi)

Population (2021)
  - Total: 5,300
  - Density: 4,500/km^{2} (12,000/sq mi)
- Time zone: UTC+1 (CET)
  - Summer (DST): UTC+2 (CEST)
- Postal code: 602 00

Brno-město (lit. 'Brno-City') is a cadastral area of the city district of Brno-střed, forming the central part and historical core of the city of Brno in the Czech Republic. Until 1850, the entire city of Brno was made up of this area, although it was smaller and with slightly different boundaries. The current area of 1.19 km² was acquired by Brno-město in the late 1960s and since November 24, 1990 it has been part of Brno-střed. About 5,300 people live here.

== History ==
The oldest settlement in the district is known from the Late Stone Age in the area of Petrov. Petrov is also one of the hypothetical locations of the early medieval Brno castle, and archaeological evidence of the oldest one-nave church in Petrov with a crypt comes from the 12th century. The existence of the Přemyslid administrative castle in the 11th and 12th centuries in Petrov is not probable in the light of archaeological research. However, the Petrov Church from the 12th century was preceded by an even older Great Moravian rotunda, the remains of which were found in 2010.

In 1641, after the conquest of Olomouc by Swedish troops, Brno became the de facto capital of Moravia, among other things, because the Zemské desky was quickly moved here from Olomouc. However, it was not until 1782 that the Margrave and Emperor Joseph II put an end to the dispute between the two cities, who definitively recognized Brno as the capital city. In 1643 and 1645, Brno was unsuccessfully besieged by the 18,000-strong Swedish army of General Torstenson, who wanted to use Brno as a base for the final attack on Vienna. During the first Swedish siege of Brno, its defenders set fire to the Franciscan monastery under Petrov to prevent the Swedes from possibly using it during the siege of Brno. But the fire also spread to the monastery of the Franciscans of St. Joseph and finally hit the cathedral of St. Peter and Paul, where he destroyed, among other things, the library and archive. The Swedes themselves did not do much damage at that time. Later, Torstenson's army was joined by the ten-thousand-strong army of George II Rákóczi of Transylvania, part of which was soon recalled to Lednice. During this siege, the city was defended by only 1,476 inhabitants, with soldiers making up less than half. However, thanks to the hardness and commitment of the defenders and the brilliant organization of the defense by Jean-Louis Raduit de Souches, the Swedes did not succeed and with eight thousand losses they were forced to end the siege.

On July 6, 1850, the territory of Brno was expanded by 19 additional cadastral areas and its area increased to 17.2 km^{2}; its extended territory (the so-called inner Brno) roughly overlapped with the modern municipal district of Brno-střed. The original town itself, together with the neighboring cadastral area of Špilberk, became the first of 4 newly established self-governing districts, which were headed by district committees headed by a superior and a deputy. In the years 1896–1916, the district underwent extensive redevelopment, during which 238 old houses and other buildings, including the Royal Chapel (demolished in 1908), were demolished, while the original plan included 429 houses. From 1939 to 1941 an extension of Husova Street was built and its connection with Nádražní Street through the then Denisovy sady area, which at the same time divided this park and created the Studánka Park on the modern cadastre of Staré Brno.

== Geography ==
Brno-město borders the cadastral areas of Černá Pole to the northeast, Zábrdovice to the east, Trnitá to the southeast, Staré Brno to the southwest, Stránice to the west, and Veveří to the northwest.

=== Territorial divisions ===
The cadastral area of Brno-město is further divided into 4 basic settlement units.

Basic settlement unit	Population			Area (km²)	Density
Basic settlement unit	2011	2021	Change	Area (km²)	Density
Brno-hrad Špilberk	647	633	-2.1%	0.34	1,861.8
Janáčkovo divadlo	1,315	1,266	-3.7%	0.27	4,688.9
Náměstí Svobody	1,203	1,411	+17.3%	0.2	7,055.0
Zelný trh	2,115	1,990	-5.9%	0.38	5,236.8

== Demographics ==
Historical population
Year	Pop.	±%
1970	11,949	—
1980	8,352	−30.1%
1991	6,744	−19.3%
2001	5,830	−13.6%
2011	5,280	−9.4%
2021	5,300	+0.4%
Source: Censuses

As of the 2021 census, the population is 5,300, up 0.4% from 5,280 in the 2011 census. The population peaked at 11,949 in 1970.
