= Jundrov =

- Cadastral territory of Brno
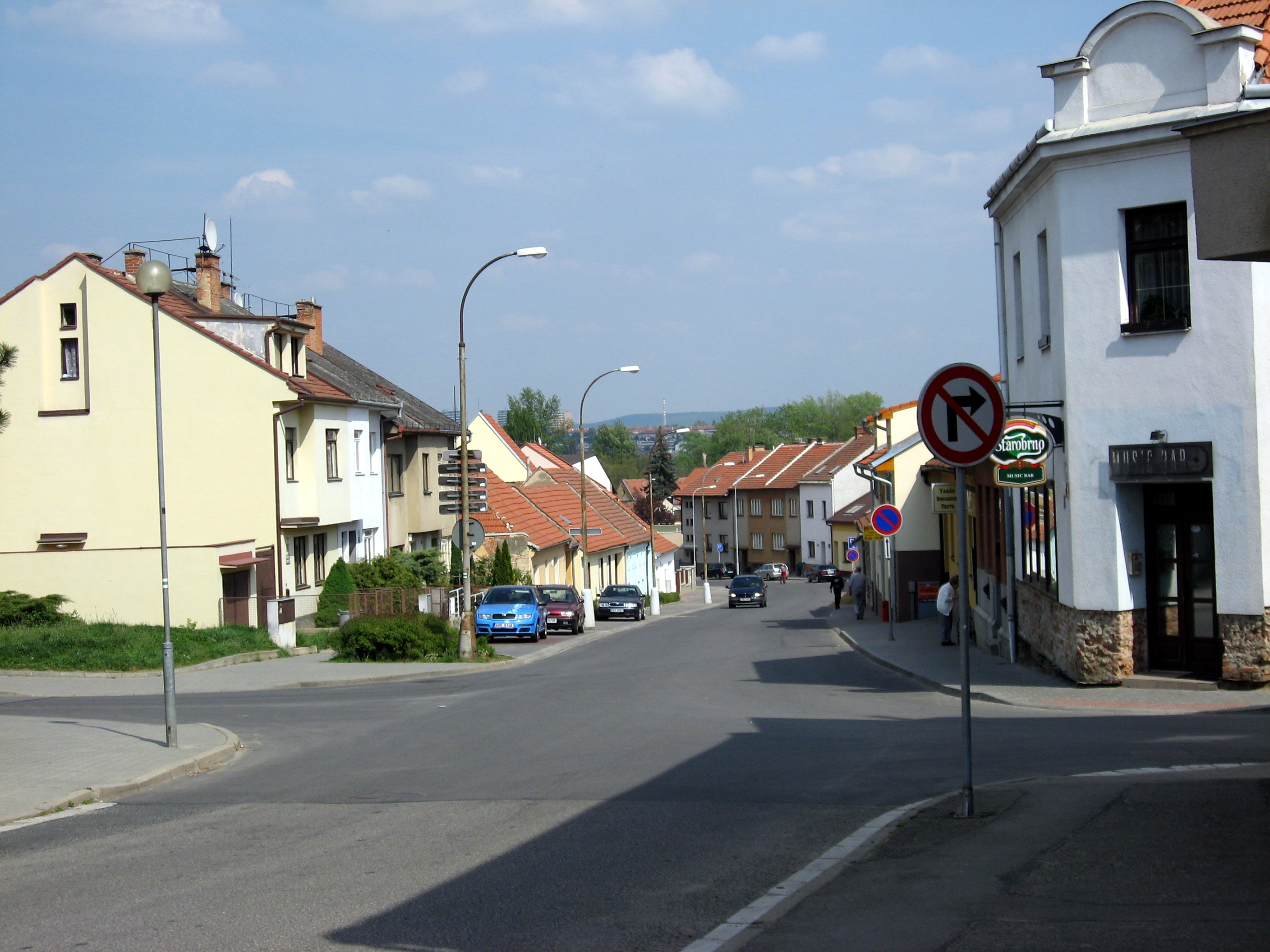
- Nálepkova street

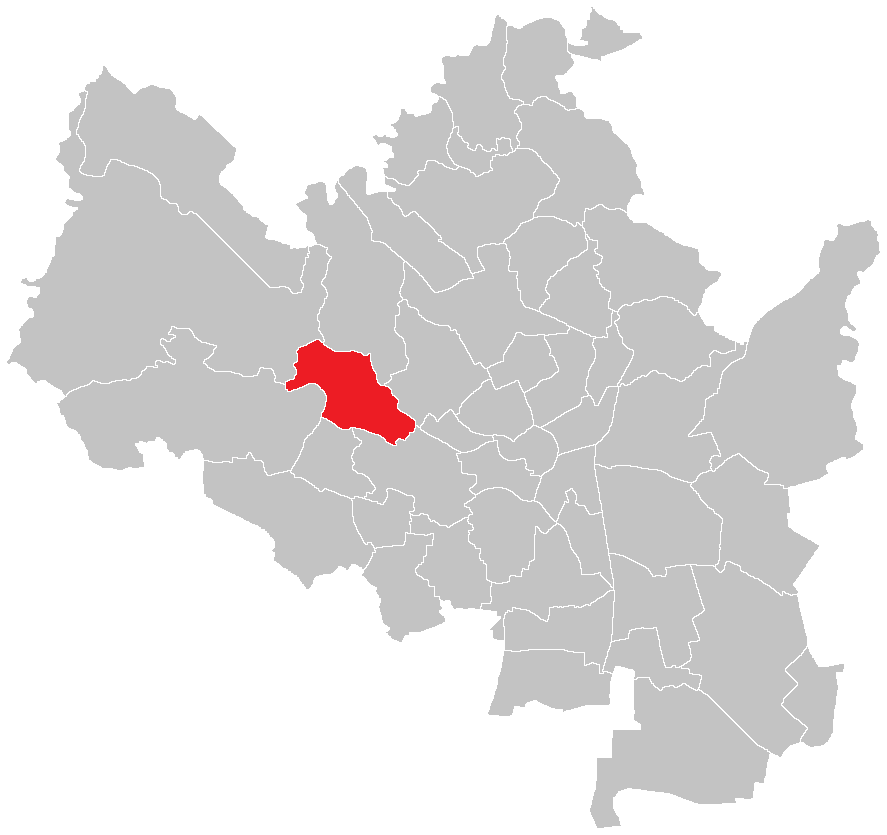
- Location of Jundrov in Brno 49°12′30″N 16°33′9″E
- Country: Czech Republic
- Region: South Moravian Region
- District: Brno-City
- City: Brno
- City district: Brno-Jundrov, Brno-Kohoutovice

Area
  - Total: 4.15 km^{2} (1.60 sq mi)

Population (2021)
  - Total: 4,458
  - Density: 1,070/km^{2} (2,780/sq mi)
- Time zone: UTC+1 (CET)
  - Summer (DST): UTC+2 (CEST)
- Postal code: 637 00

Jundrov (German: Jundorf, Hantec: Jobsko) is a municipal part and cadastral territory in the west of the city of Brno in the Czech Republic. It has an area of 4.15 square kilometres (1.60 sq mi). Originally an independent municipality, it was annexed to Brno in 1919, and since November 24, 1990, most of Jundrov is part of the city district of Brno-Jundrov, however the small southern part of Jundrov with its gardens falls into Brno-Kohoutovice. It has about 4,400 inhabitants.

It is located on the right bank of the Svratka.

== Etymology ==
The original name of the village was Judendorf ("Jewish village"). The Czech name developed from the German shortened form Jundorf, attested from the 17th century.

== Territorial divisions ==
The cadastral territory of Jundrov is further divided into 7 basic settlement units.

Basic settlement unit	Population		
Basic settlement unit	2011	2021	Change
Veslařská	131	127	-3.1%
Křemelky	19	75	+294.7%
Jundrov-střed	1,688	1,741	+3.1%
Jundrov-sever	877	1,115	+27.1%
Jundrov-jih	1,314	1,387	+5.6%
Holedná	0	0	+0%
Mladá hora	5	13	+160.0%

== Demographics ==
As of the 2021 census, the population is 4,458, up 10% from 4,034 in the 2011 census, but still slightly lower from the peak population of 4,488 in 1980.

Historical population

Year	Pop.	±%
1869	478	—
1880	583	+22.0%
1890	710	+21.8%
1900	1,090	+53.5%
1910	1,717	+57.5%

Year	Pop.	±%
1921	2,142	+24.8%
1930	2,785	+30.0%
1950	3,158	+13.4%
1961	2,168	−31.3%
1970	2,035	−6.1%

Year	Pop.	±%
1980	4,488	+120.5%
1991	3,630	−19.1%
2001	3,725	+2.6%
2011	4,034	+8.3%
2021	4,458	+10.5%

The border of the cadastral territory changed in 1995.
Source: Censuses

== Sport ==
The traditional sport is football, the modern history of Jundrov football began to be written in 1958, but the very beginnings date back to 1924.
