= Veveří =

- Cadastral territory of Brno
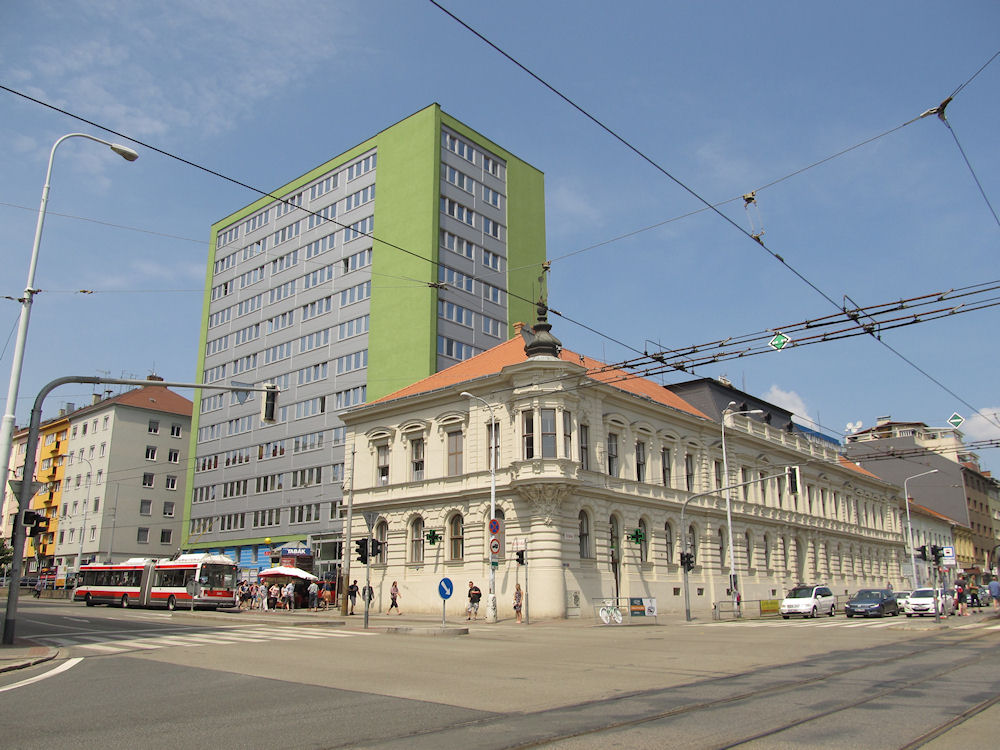
- Kotlářská street

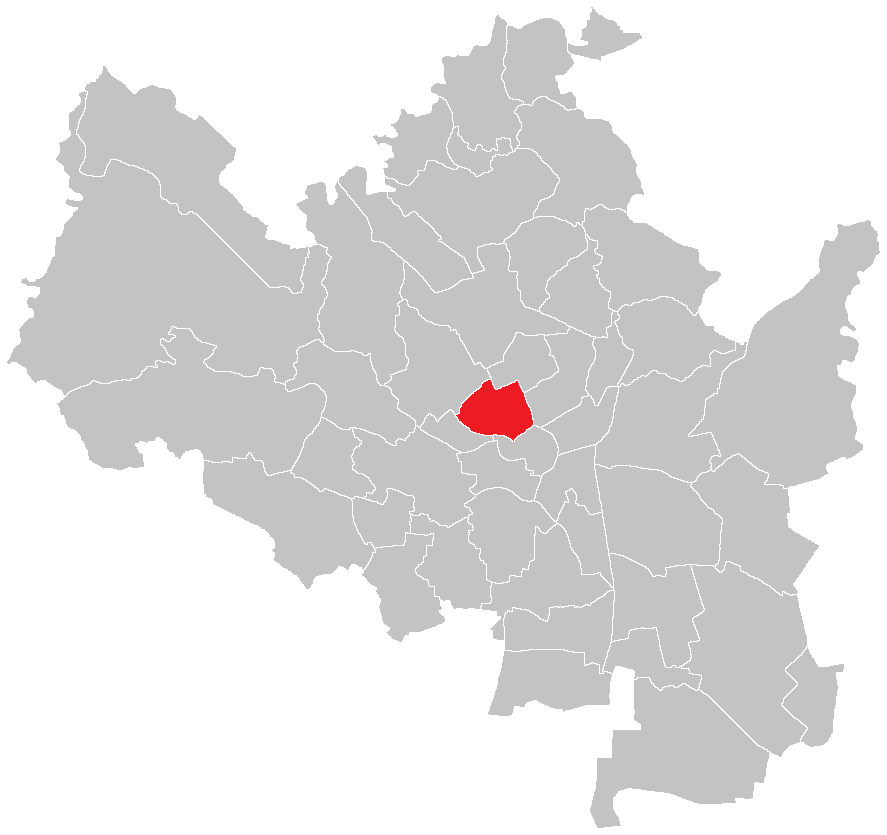
- Location of Veveří in Brno 49°12′18″N 16°35′41″E
- Country: Czech Republic
- Region: South Moravian Region
- District: Brno-City
- City: Brno
- City district: Brno-střed
- Established: 1969

Area
  - Total: 1.98 km^{2} (0.76 sq mi)

Population (2021)
  - Total: 20,467
  - Density: 10,300/km^{2} (26,800/sq mi)
- Time zone: UTC+1 (CET)
  - Summer (DST): UTC+2 (CEST)
- Postal code: 602 00, 616 00

Veveří is a cadastral territory in the city district of Brno-střed, located north of the historic center of the city of Brno in the Czech Republic. It has an area of 1.98 km². The territory of modern Veveří was annexed to Brno in 1850. Since November 24, 1990, Veveří has been part of Brno-střed. Over 20,000 people live here.

== History ==
Most of the territory of today's Veveří area was annexed to Brno on July 6, 1850 as part of the then cadastral territories of Křížová, Velká Nová Ulice, Švábka and Malá Nová Ulice; a smaller part of the territory in the north was acquired from Žabovřesky until around 1870.

Veveří was created as an independent cadastral territory during the second cadastral reform of Brno in the late 1960s. On July 1, 1979, the western parts of the cadastral territories of Lužánky and Ponava were also added to it, but for a change it lost the blocks between Kounicová and Klatovská streets in favor of Ponava. From its inception until 1990, the entire modern cadastral territory of Veveří, including parts of the cadastral territories of Lužánky and Ponava, which were later attached to it, belonged to the Brno II Municipal District. Since November 24, 1990, the entire cadastral territory of Veveří has been part of the city district of Brno-střed.

== Urbanism ==
The district is directly adjacent to the historic core of Brno and therefore has a distinctly urban character with several streets with high traffic. The development of the district consists of multi-storey, largely historic houses and a number of representative houses, such as the luxurious Art Nouveau tenement houses on Konečné náměstí, which are dominated by the Tivoli block of flats on the corner of Konečné náměstí and Jiráskova street. The Šumavská Towers on Šumavská street dominate the whole district. The cadastral territory also includes Kraví hora, on which the Brno Observatory and Planetarium are located.

== Territorial divisions ==
The cadastral territory of Veveří is further divided into 6 basic settlement units.

Basic settlement unit	Population		
Basic settlement unit	2011	2021	Change
Dřevařská	3,393	3,465	+2.1%
Gorkého	4,901	5,090	+3.9%
Konečného náměstí	5,548	5,630	+1.5%
Kraví hora	16	30	+87.5%
Mášova	1,843	2,115	+14.8%
U stadiónu	3,621	4,137	+14.3%

== Demographics ==
Historical population
Year	Pop.	±%
1961	54,453	—
1970	35,146	−35.5%
1980	28,707	−18.3%
1991	25,045	−12.8%
2001	22,366	−10.7%
2011	19,322	−13.6%
2021	20,467	+5.9%
Source: Censuses

As of the 2021 census, the population is 20,467, up 6% from 19,322 in the 2011 census, but still less than half of the peak population of 54,453 in 1961.
