= Anthropos Pavilion =

Museum in Brno, Czech Republic

Coordinates: 49°11′31″N 16°34′1″E

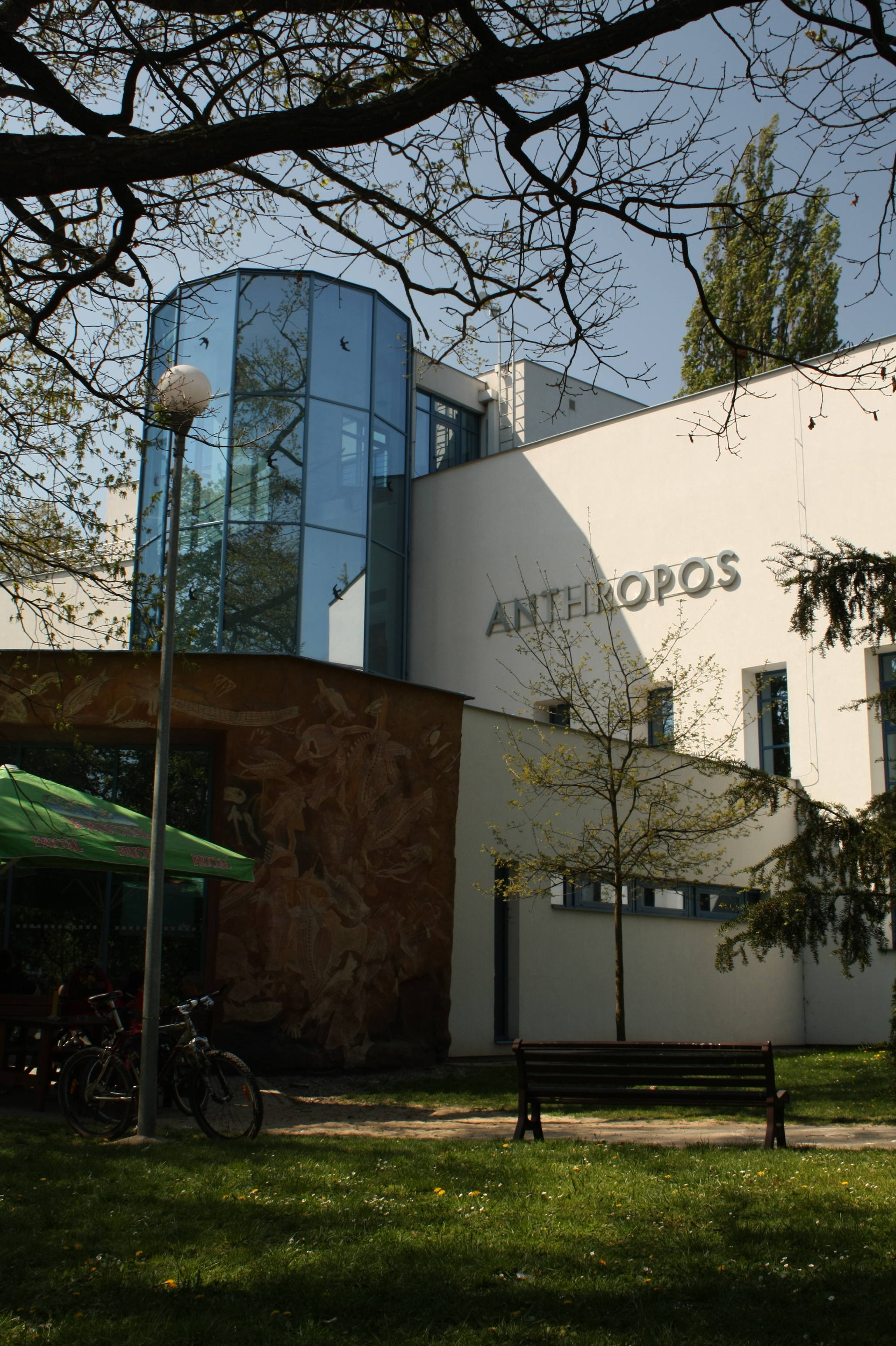
Anthropos Pavilion.

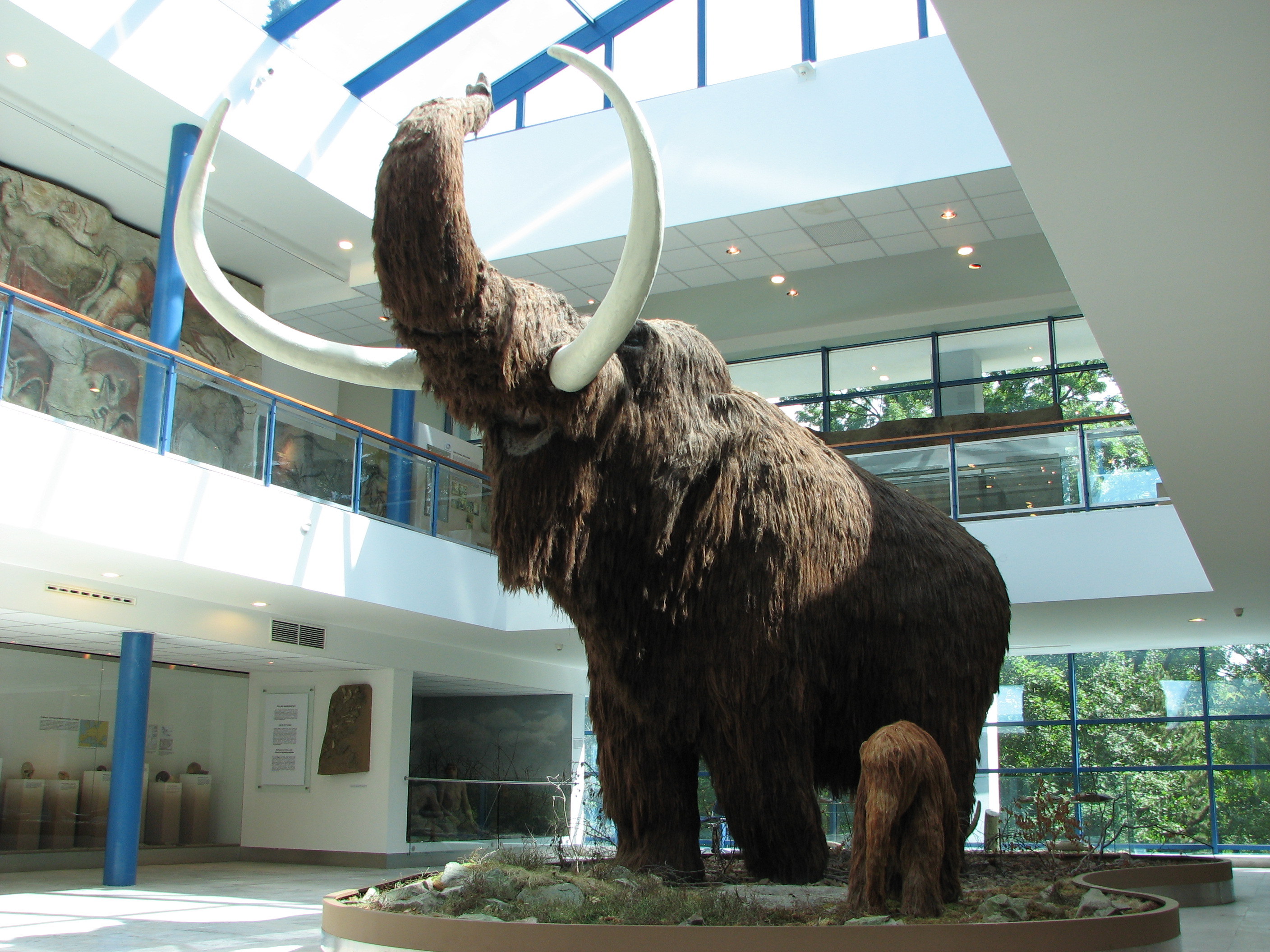
A life-size model of mammoth. The central point of the main exhibition hall.

Anthropos (or Anthropos Pavilion, from the Greek Άνθρωπος, human or man) is a museum located in the city of Brno, South Moravia, Czech Republic. The museum is a part of the Moravské zemské muzeum (Moravian Museum). It focuses on exhibitions presenting the oldest history of Europe and mankind. In a 2009 exhibition, the museum presented the most important art works of the Paleolithic era, such as Venus of Willendorf (exhibited for the first time outside of Austria) and Venus of Dolní Věstonice.

== Basic characteristics ==
The museum is situated on the right bank of the river Svratka, in the cadastral municipality of Pisárky in the western part of Brno. It consists of a permanent, three-part exhibition presenting the oldest history of human settlement in Moravia and Europe and of temporary exhibitions. The permanent exhibition includes a life-size model of mammoth.

== History ==
In 1928, during an exhibition of the contemporary culture held at the Brno Exhibition Centre, the archaeologist Karel Absolon presented the findings of the oldest history of human settlements in a solo exhibition called Člověk a jeho rod (Man and his Ancestry). The exhibition was supported by the first Czechoslovak president Tomáš Garrigue Masaryk and by the entrepreneur Tomáš Baťa, however, the creation of an independent institute was thwarted by the financial crisis and later by the World War II. It was not until the 1950s when Absolon's successor, archaeologist and then Director of the Moravian Museum Jan Jelínek enforced building of an independent pavilion in Brno-Pisárky. The museum was opened in 1961.

Between 2003 and 2006, the pavilion underwent a large reconstruction. It was reopened to public in 2006.

== Permanent exhibition ==
The permanent exhibition consists of three parts:

=== 1st part ===
- "Moravian Hunters and Gatherers"
- "The Oldest Art of Europe"
- "Palaeolithic Technologies"

=== 2nd part ===
- "Genetics in the Evolution of Man"
- "The Story of Mankind"

=== 3rd part ===
- "Cousins or Brothers? – Ethology of Primates"
