= Zemské desky =

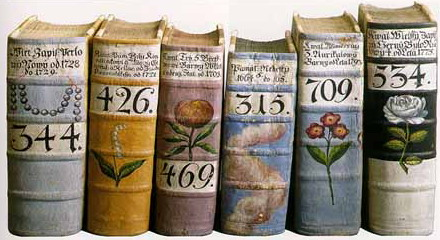
Zemské desky

Zemské desky (German: Landtafel; in old Czech, always desky zemské, literal translation, "Land tables") is old Czech source of law. It is predecessor of land registry for real estates owned under allodial title (hereditary estates). Also resolutions of Diets, rulings of the Land (supreme) Court and other general legal rules were recorded there.

They were held in a kind of special, quasi-reverent regard and were referred to as the "witness which cannot be prevailed upon." Access to them was extremely limited. During sessions of the Land Court, when used as evidence, they were not brought into the main hall but read from a special balcony. The officer responsible for them was the Lord High Scribe of Bohemia, a member of the gentry. They were not compiled as one book per year, but rather filled record after record in a single volume to avoid wasting paper. Instead of being numbered, the books were hand-painted with distinct symbols and referred to by the color associated with each symbol, such as the Book of the Color of Death or Book of the Color of Parrot.

In Bohemia, the records were kept from before 1278, but nearly all were destroyed in the Great Fire of Prague on 2 June 1541. The only surviving volume covers the years 1316 to 1324. Since 1541, the Bohemian tables have been preserved. Moravian tables go uninterruptedly from their founding in 1348. During reign of Francis II (1795) they were numbered and the practice of colors and poetical names stopped. They ceased to be used for recording in the year 1948, as a source of law in rare cases serve up today.
