= Hantec slang =

Variety of Czech spoken in Brno

Hantec
- hantec
- Pronunciation: Czech pronunciation: [ˈɦan.tɛts]
- Region: Brno
- Language family: Indo-European: Balto-Slavic; Slavic; West Slavic; Czech–Slovak; Czech; Moravian; Central Moravian; Hantec
- Writing system: Czech alphabet

Language codes
- ISO 639-3: –
- IETF: cs-u-sd-cz642

Hantec (Czech pronunciation: [ˈɦan.tɛts]) is a unique dialect previously spoken among lower classes in Brno, Czech Republic during the 19th and early 20th centuries. It developed from the mixing of the Czech language as spoken in Moravia with the languages of other residents of Brno, including Germans and Jews. Today Hantec exists in its original form only among some elderly people, but many words and expressions have become a part of Czech spoken in Brno.

== Phrases ==
Hantec	Standard Czech	Usage	English
Zdar jak sviňa!	Přeji hezký den!	Generic greeting	Have a Good Day!
Betálný Štatl	Nádherné město Brno	Used when referring to Brno City	Beautiful Brno
Zoncna rubluje	Slunce ostře svítí	Complain about it being too hot today	Sun is shining
Jak šwimhozny na priglu	Jako plavky na Brněnské přehradě	Comparison to say that someone/something is useless	Like swimsuit on Brno Reservoir
Hodit čuz na filáče	Koukat se po ženách	To say that you are here to look at women or generic phrase to avoid explaining what you are doing (cf. English "see a man about a dog/horse")	Looking at women
Vozubená koňa	Krásná dívka	saying that a girl is beautiful	A horse with a lot of teeth
Kde tu máte retych?	Kde tu máte záchod?	[in accordance with literal meaning]	Where is the toilet?
Kudy se tu dostanu na rolu?	Jak se dostanu na hlavní nádraží?	[in accordance with literal meaning]	Where is the main train station?

== Nouns ==
Hantec	Standard Czech	origin of phrase	English
zoncna	slunce	from German Sonne	sun
šalina	tramvaj	from German "elektrische Linie" - "electric line"	tramway
augle	oči	from German Augen	eyes
gómat	chápat; myslet	from Czech koumat	to understand; to think
lochec	smích	from German Lachen	laugh
love	peníze	from Romani love	money
retych	záchod/WC	from Austrian Rettich	toilet
rola	vlakové nádraží	from German Rollen	railway station
prigl	Brněnská přehrada	from German Priel	Brno Reservoir
švimhózny	plavky	from German Schwimmhose, from schwimmen and Hose	swimsuit
štatl	centrum města	from German Stadt	(down)town
Štatl	centrum města Brna	from German Stadt	Brno City (centre)
šlofnót	spát	from German schlafen	to sleep
cajzl	Pražák	from German Zeisig	a Praguer
škopek	pivo / půllitr	from Czech škopek (bucket)	(a half-litre of) beer
merchna	pohádka	from German Märchen	fairy tale

== See also ==
- Moravian dialects
