= 2021 Czech census =

National census

Sčítání 2021
← 2011	2021
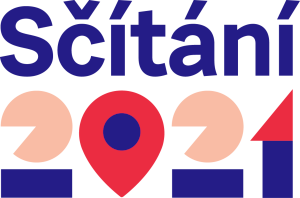
- Logo of the census

General information
- Country: Czech Republic
- Authority: Czech Statistical Office
- Website: www.scitani.cz/csu/scitani2021/

Results
- Total population: 10,524,167
- Most populous region: Central Bohemian Region (1,415,463)
- Least populous region: Karlovy Vary Region (279,103)

The 2021 Census of the Czech Republic took place between 27 March and 9 April 2021. It was conducted by the Czech Statistical Office at a cost estimated to be 2.23 billion Czech koruna. Failure to complete the census could lead to a fine of 10,000 Czech koruna.

== Preliminary results ==
Preliminary results were released in January 2022. The national population was 10.52 million, which represented an increase of approximately 90,000 from the previous census in 2011. At the same time, the average age was reported at 42.7 years, an increase of 1.7 years in the last ten years.
