= 2011 Czech census =

National census, published in 2014

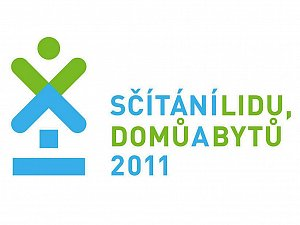
Logo of The 2011 Census

The 2011 Census of the Czech Republic was conducted by the Czech Statistical Office (CZSO) in 2011 in accordance with Regulation no. 763/2008 of the European Parliament and Council which states that censuses must be carried out in all Member States once every ten years starting in 2011 with more frequent censuses decided by the European Commission.

The Parliament of Czech Republic passed Act no. 296/2009, requiring that a Census be conducted in early 2011. The act obligating participation and precise completion of the census would only be applicable to the 2011 Census, not other censuses that would be mandated in the future. Those who refused to partake in the census or provided false information to the Census would be fined 10,000 CZK. Finance Minister Miroslav Kalousek told the Chamber of Deputies that the cost of the census would be CZK 2.5 billion.

Information given during the census must have been valid up to midnight Saturday, March 26, 2011 (known as the "decisive moment").

The first preliminary results of the census were published at the beginning of 2014.

== Process and Question-types ==
The Census was conducted in two main steps:

- Census workers had to give residents informational leaflet with information about the census and the date residents will receive their census form.
- On the appointed day, census workers visited homes and provide them with one to three kinds of census forms: a green form for every person at a residence, a yellow form for each residence, and an orange form for the owner of the residence. Census forms could have been filled out electronically at https://www.czso.cz/csu/sldb or filled out manually. Hand-written forms were turned into a census worker, or were sent to the Czech statistical office by mail

Counting paper sheets prior to processing were converted into electronic form and anonymized. Anonymised data was electronically transmitted to the National Archives.

Compared to the previous census experienced fewer questions on car ownership/rentership or television, but questions regarding one's computer at home and internet connection, and registered partnership were included. Questions about marriage and employment were less detailed and questions about religious faith, religious affiliation and nationality were not required.

== Census workers/volunteers ==
Czech Statistical Office, to ensure that work of the census workers (delivery of forms, collecting completed forms and enter data into the computer) was conducted timely and accurately, hired the Czech Post Office to assign census workers. By referendum, employees of municipal authorities, Czech Post and other volunteers became direct contractors with the CSO, as in the previous census. Most census workers were Czech Post workers who volunteered to distribute forms during their shifts. Critics found that many postmen were forced to volunteer under the threat of layoffs, were paid less despite doing more work (90 CZK / h with 10% tax; externs hired CSO were supposed to pay several times higher), and that the activities were organized chaotically. Census workers spent 3 minutes per household on average. The Czech Statistical Office and the Czech Post Office refused to comment on the issue of overloading their employees with census duties. The Czech Post Office had problems obtaining 14,000 workers for the census, of which two-thirds were to be external. Finally, around 9500 census workers were used. External volunteers were mainly family members of Czech Post staff, and other volunteers were university-educated people aged around 50 years, majored in statistics and sociology.

In 2011, the first census enumerators checked the accuracy of records and performed a preliminary summary.

== Trial census ==
The Czech Statistical Office conducted a trial census with a "decisive moment" at midnight April 17 (the date where the information given in the census must be valid) in preparation for the 2011 census. Around 0.5% of the population participated in the Trial census. Its aim was to verify the accuracy of all phases of the census and evaluate experiences, especially to verify that forms from the national census were easy to fill out. During the test census, 6.4% of the affected population submitted the form via the Internet. Based on experience from the test census, the electronic form was modified. It also showed that older respondents did not understand the term "registered partnership" and considered it equivalent to marriage. The test census encountered some minor problems with the distribution of forms which also occurred during the 2011 census.

Respondents who wished to enroll as a faith jediism were allowed to in the 2011 census according to the CSO. In response to this move, several Czech pagan groups contacted the CSO with requests for the allocation of its own census code for paganism. Those requests were granted on February 2, 2011. Respondents could have filled out section 12 by declaring a particular faith and a particular church or religious community, while also having the option of only "zaškrnout" ("faithful but not to any church or religious society"). In the electronic form, respondents did not have to select from a list of churches or religions and were not limited to registered churches and religious societies Czech Statistical Office have not disclosed the methodology, so it is not publicly known how the statistical evaluation of data would account the unlisted religions/churches or "zaškrnout" options.

== Organizational issues ==
The distribution of forms was accompanied by many problems. For example, in many places, census workers did not arrive in time that citizens have were asked to come so people were often repeatedly forced to wait unnecessarily and in a large queue at the post office, and even those who wanted to fill in a form over Internet. Some commissioners, inconsistent with the policy authorized by officials, advised a visit in the morning or after an excessively long period of time to prevent long lines. Czech Statistical Office also expressed dissatisfaction with the unreliability of the Czech Post. Czech Post, however, reported that all work is carried out as standard, and the situation was stabilized by census commissioners. The Call Center of the Czech Post had funding to handle only a fraction of questions and comments that they had received (e.g. March 8, only 6000 questions/comments were responded to from just 60,000 that were received), but after increased funding, responses were increased by 15%.

== Public attitudes ==
=== Media and discussion ===
Preparation for the census was accompanied by controversy in the media, especially on webzines, blogs and Internet chat rooms, where many support the call for a boycott. The Party of Free Citizens established a website known as "I can not be numbered! " in which it presents arguments against the census and linked a number of like-minded articles on the web. The common objections were that instead of filling out the forms printed for the entire population, a questionnaire survey should be used on a sample of the population, which would have allowed for some European regulation.

=== Exploration ===
A ČTK report published on March 24, 2011, reported that out of a sample of 1,248 respondents, 98% of respondents were aware that the census takes place, 29% did not know about the mandatory participation and a fine for absence, and a third of respondents disagreed with the fact that the census is beneficial. 70% of respondents considered the CSO a good guarantor of privacy. People with less education and with a lower socioeconomic position were less likely to believe the benefits of census data protection and guarantees. Young people and uneducated people were less likely to know that the census is mandatory.

=== Constitutional complaint against census ===
Klára Burešová Kunovice, a student of public finance and political science, filed a constitutional complaint against the census on March 16, 2011, with the law firm of Klára Samková.

The petitioner argued that the census was illegal for the following reasons:

- In terms of state intervention, the right of privacy granted to Czech citizens under Art. 8 of the Charter of Fundamental Rights and Freedoms were being infringed upon due to sensitive data (ethnicity and faith directly, sexual orientation indirectly asking for registered partnerships) being collected. The census itself, the petitioner argued, was not a permissible reason to allow for such an invasion of privacy.
- Czech Post volunteers would have access to her private information, another breach of privacy.
- The fine of CZK 10,000 for not filling in forms was disproportionately high in comparison with fines for offenses of comparable gravity and in comparison to suing the organizer of the census, which was considered as violation of the constitutional right to property.
- The law on the census in 2011 was an ad hoc law and not common law, which is a violation of separation of powers between the legislative and the executive.
- Expenditure on census were considered wasteful and unnecessary, thereby, especially during the poor state of public finances of the state, threatened price stability as a value protected by the Constitution.

Significant media reported on a constitutional complaint, but the report by ČTK only contained comments by Deputy CSO engineer Stanislav Drápal of Economics, who stated that she had a chance to succeed. The opinion of any attorney was not reported by ČTK nor Reuters.

The complaint was assigned to the Fourth Chamber of the Constitutional Court, led by Judge Vlasta Formánková.

On 1 August 2011 the Constitutional Court rejected the complaint as unjustified, stressing that it was a legal obligation to complete the census in the current manner.

=== Prosecution of citizens who did not meet the legal obligation ===
On September 22, 2011, administrative proceedings were initiated against 233 persons who were found, after a thorough investigation, to have deliberately not met the legal obligation to complete the census. They were charged with a financial penalty of up to 10 000 CZK.

== Preliminary results of the Census and Housing 2011 ==
By Thursday, December 15, 2011, the CSO published the preliminary results of the 2011 Census. The Czech population was increasing mainly due to foreigners and the total at that date was 10,562,214 inhabitants. The Census also found that the number of foreigners living in the Czech Republic has increased by 360 percent since 2001.

Most citizens no longer had to proclaim their nationality. One of the exceptions were Moravians who reported by their nationality on the Census. Reports showed that 522,474 citizens were Moravians, an increase from the previous census. The share of believers in individual churches had fundamentally changed. Many Czech refused to answer the census question regarding religious association, although there was an increase in the number of people identifying themselves as Jedis. There were significant increases in the number of university students and people with no education. It was also found that citizens returned to traditional solid fuels, or wood heating. Using coal as the heat source decreases compared to the last census. Municipalities sold off most of their public housing, thus significantly increasing the number of privately owned apartments.

According to the schedule, the CSO published other results in Q3 2012. In Q4 2012, detailed information on households and dwellings for the whole country and region was released as well as further basic information about the districts and municipalities. In the 1st quarter of 2013, detailed data for counties, cities and municipalities became available. In Q2 2013, data regarding transportation to work became available. The Statistical Lexicon of Municipalities and Housing Census Atlas was released 2nd half of 2013. Total data for the Czech Republic was forwarded to the European Commission CSO at the turn of 2013 and 2014.
