= Obřany =

- Cadastral territory of Brno
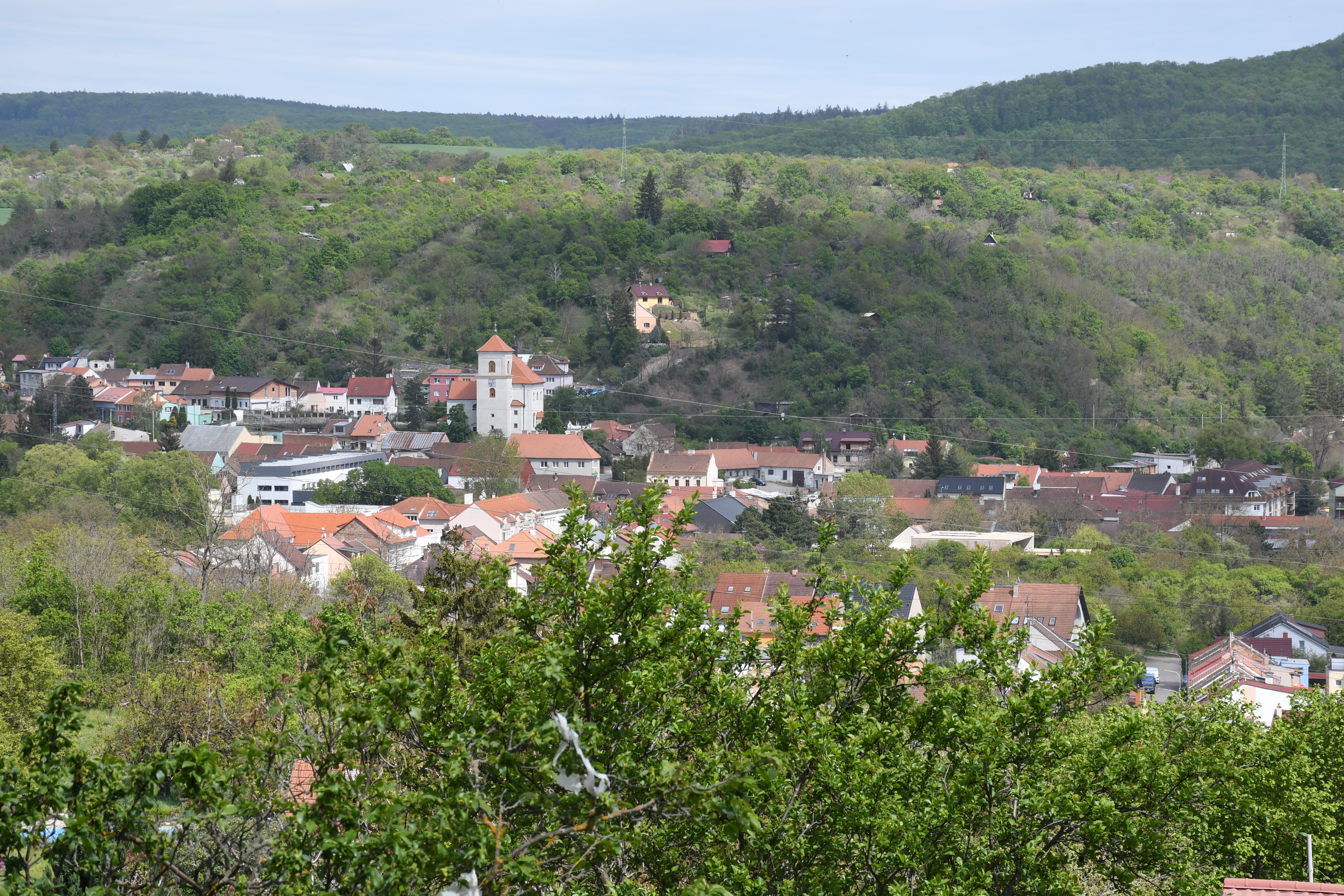
- View of Obřany from the west

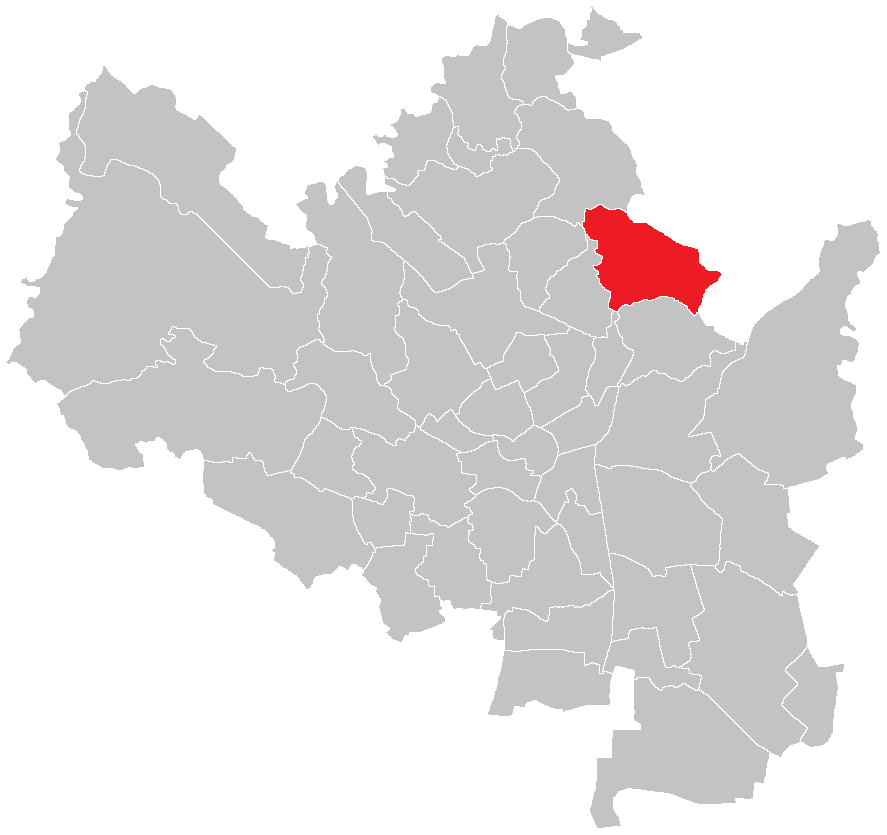
- Location of Obřany in Brno 49°13′50″N 16°38′56″E
- Country: Czech Republic
- Region: South Moravian Region
- City: Brno
- City district: Brno-Maloměřice and Obřany

Area
  - Total: 5.28 km^{2} (2.04 sq mi)

Population (2021)
  - Total: 3,014
  - Density: 571/km^{2} (1,480/sq mi)
- Time zone: UTC+1 (CET)
  - Summer (DST): UTC+2 (CEST)
- Postal code: 614 00

Obřany (German: Oberseß) is a municipal part and cadastral territory on the northeastern edge of the city of Brno, Czech Republic. It has an area of 5.28 km^{2}. Originally its own municipality, it was annexed into Brno in 1919, since November 24, 1990 it has been part of the city district of Brno-Maloměřice and Obřany. About 3,000 people live here.

There are also several vineyard tracks in Obřany (Nad loučí, U doubku).

== Etymology ==
The original name of its inhabitants "Obřáné" was transferred to the settlement, which was based on the adjective obří (large). It is not possible to determine the exact motivation behind the naming: it could have been the naming of people of large stature or the designation of the inhabitants of a place that was somehow giant (while proceeding through the Svitava valley from Brno, in the Obřany area, you will come across cliffs that start upwards), or the designation of people (incoming) from a village named Obry (however, a village of that name is unknown).

== Description ==
Obřany is located on the right bank of the Svitava and has the character of a larger village, which is interrupted by a small housing estate at the end of the development. Fryčajova street forms the axis of the district, connecting Obřany with neighboring Maloměřice and the neighboring municipality of Bílovice nad Svitavou. The local parish church of St. Wenceslas. In the south of Obřany, close to the bridge over Svitava, there is an unmissable dilapidated building of the former Obřany textile factory, which was owned by the Jewish businessman Adolf Essler until 1939.

To the east of Obřany's core, on a high promontory above Svitava on its right bank, there is a prehistoric fort. Even further east, but on the left side of the Svitava, now in the municipality of Kanice, are the ruins of the Obřany Castle.

== Geography ==
Obřany borders the following cadastral territories within Brno: Lesná in the west, Husovice in the southwest, Maloměřice in the south and Soběšice in the north. It is also adjacent to the municipalities of Kanice to the east, and Bílovice nad Svitavou to the north.

== Territorial divisions ==
The cadastral territory of Obřany is further divided into 5 basic settlement units.

Basic settlement unit	Population		
Basic settlement unit	2011	2021	Change
Hlaváčova	850	928	+9.2%
Bílovická-výpustky	1,454	1,768	+21.6%
K Bílovicím	26	0	-100.0%
Hradiska	213	237	+11.3%
Holé hory-Líchy	36	81	+125.0%

== Demographics ==
Historical population

Year	Pop.	±%
1869	827	—
1880	1,001	+21.0%
1890	1,155	+15.4%
1900	1,362	+17.9%
1910	1,545	+13.4%

Year	Pop.	±%
1921	1,665	+7.8%
1930	2,646	+58.9%
1950	2,740	+3.6%
1961	2,761	+0.8%
1970	2,260	−18.1%

Year	Pop.	±%
1980	2,720	+20.4%
1991	2,343	−13.9%
2001	2,385	+1.8%
2011	2,579	+8.1%
2021	3,014	+16.9%

Source: Censuses

== Transport ==
Transport connections with other parts of Brno are available via bus line 75 and night bus line N94, which also go to Bílovice nad Svitavou. There is also tram line No. 4, which stops at Obřanský most (Obřany bridge) in neighboring Maloměřice, where the Babická tram loop is also located.

The railway line from Brno to Havlíčkův Brod runs through Obřany, on which Obřanský tunel (Obřany tunnel) and the viaduct over the Svitava are located. On the edge of Obřany, the railway line from Brno to Česká Třebová runs through the Svitava valley.

A possible realization of a railway stop is being prepared on the Havlíčkův Brod line, which should be located on the area of Fryčajova street. The establishment of the stop has been discussed since 2014. In 2018, a feasibility study was completed for the railway administration.
