= Jiří Mahen =

Czech writer (1882–1939)

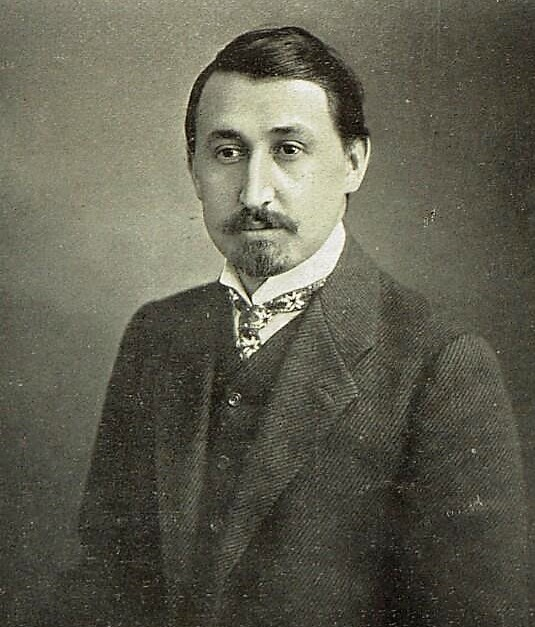
- Jiři Mahen in 1910
- Born: Antonín Vančura; 12 December 1882; Čáslav, Bohemia, Austria-Hungary
- Died: 22 May 1939 (aged 56); Brno, Czechoslovakia
- Resting place: Brno Central Cemetery
- Occupations: Novelist, playwright

Jiří Mahen (born Antonín Vančura; 12 December 1882 – 22 May 1939) was a Czech novelist and playwright. He was a prolific author and his literary work also includes essays, poetry, scientific articles, manuals and fairy tales. He was a significant figure in cultural life in the city of Brno.

== Life ==
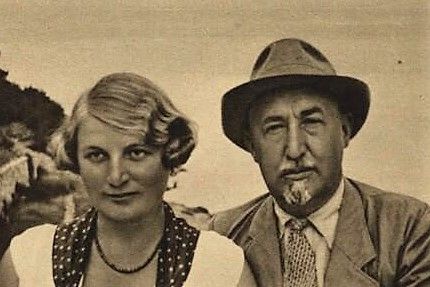
Jiří Mahen and his wife

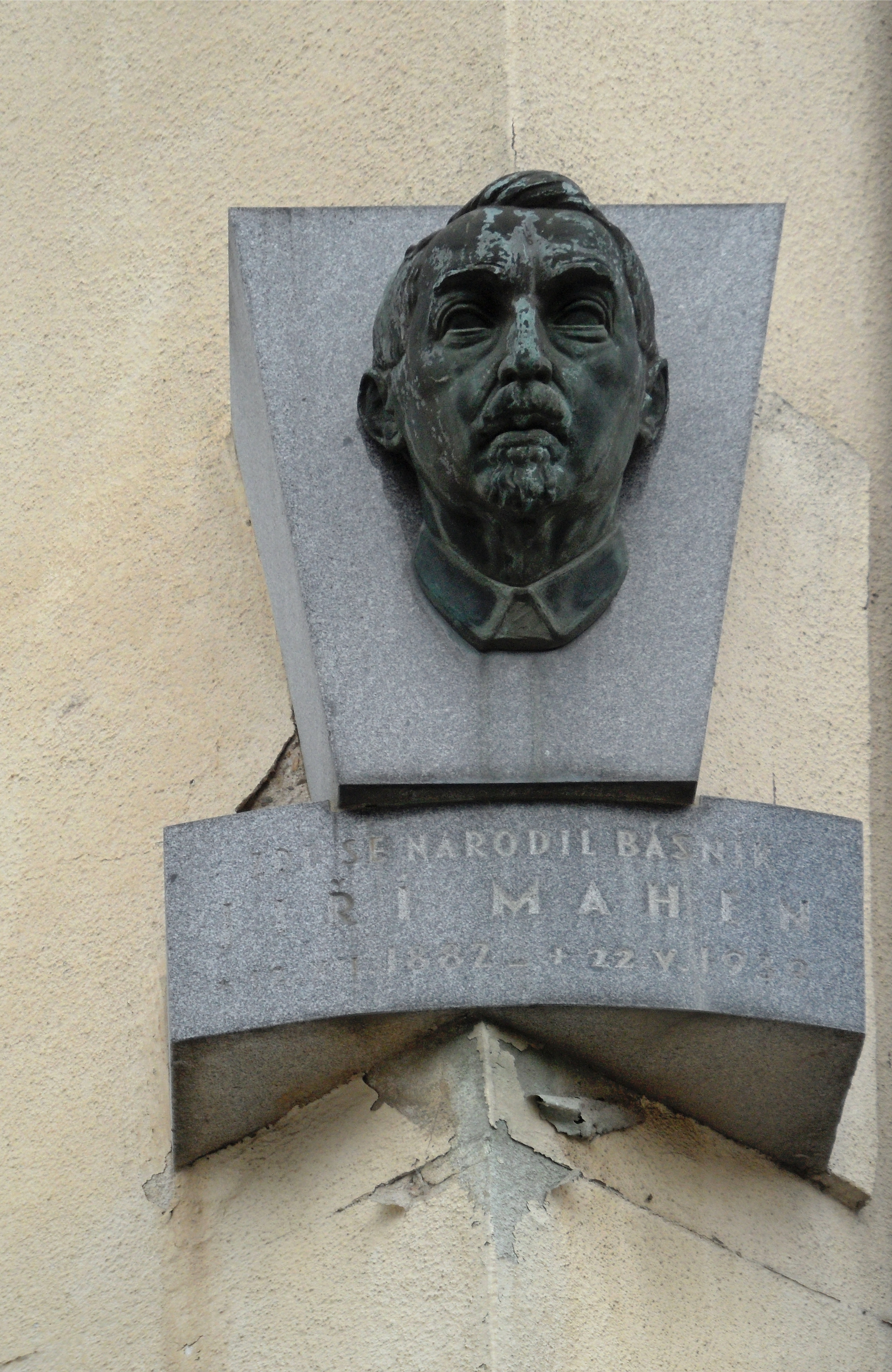
Memorial plaque of Jiří Mahen on his birthplace in Čáslav

Jiří Mahen was born Antonín Vančura on 12 December 1882, into an evangelical family. He was the third of thirteen children and his father was a baker. His second cousin was the novelist Vladislav Vančura. He studied at the gymnasiums in Čáslav and in Mladá Boleslav, where he graduated in 1902. In Mladá Boleslav, he joined the group of anarchists around Stanislav Kostka Neumann, together with his friends František Gellner and Rudolf Těsnohlídek. His literary beginnings took place at this time, when his poems were published in Neumann's magazine Nový kult.

At the age of 19, Vančura chose the pseudonym Jiří Maheu, after the character Maheu in the book Germinal by Émile Zola. Due to a printing error, the name was distorted to Mahen, which Vančura liked and he kept it. He also used several other pseudonyms during his literary career. In 1902–1907, he studied linguistics of the Czech and German languages at the Faculty of Arts of the Charles University in Prague. Due to his anarchist views, he lost his family's financial support while studying at university. Anarchism and the bohemian life in poverty was reflected in his early work. He left university just before graduation and went to Moravia, where he became a teacher in Hodonín (1907–1908) and in Přerov (1908–1910).

In 1910, he moved to Brno, where he lived until his death. He was employed as a journalist for Lidové noviny, one of the leading Czech newspapers. From 1910, his literary works began to be successful. At that time, he also met his future wife, Karla, who was twelve years younger than him. They wanted to get married in 1915, but the wedding did not take place until 1919. He did not go to the war front during World War I, due to feigning ill health.

In the years 1918–1920, he was the dramaturg of the National Theatre Brno. In 1921, he became the librarian of the newly established Brno Municipal Library. He approached his work responsibly and actively, and he fundamentally participated in the development of culture in Brno. He was promoted to the director of the library in 1937. In addition to culture, Mahen's interests included environmental protection and fishing. He published several scientific articles on fish and fishing and became the chairman of the First Czech Fishing Association in Brno. Due to depression following occupation of Czechoslovakia by Nazi Germany, he committed suicide. He died on 22 May 1939 in Brno and was buried at the Brno Central Cemetery. His grave, designed by architect František Kalivoda and with a tombstone by sculptor Jiří Marek, is protected as a cultural monument.

== Selected work ==
Jiří Mahen was a prolific writer. He started out as a poet, but became known primarily as a novelist and playwright. His important texts are the novels Kamarádi svobody (Friends of Freedom) and Měsíc (The Moon), a novel involving poetism, the plays Mrtvé moře (Dead Sea), Jánošík (played in the National Theatre in Prague), and Generace (Generation). He was the author of many books of essays, of which Rybářská knížka (Fishermen's Book), is the best known.

=== Prose ===
- Podivíni (1907)
- Kamarádi svobody (1907)
- Díže (1911)
- Měsíc (1921)
- Kozí bobky z Parnasu (1921)
- Nejlepší dobrodružství (1929)

=== Theatre plays ===
- Juanův konec (1905)
- Prorok (1906)
- Jánošík (1909)
- Ulička odvahy (1917)
- Mrtvé moře (1918)
- Nebe, peklo, ráj (1919)
- Chroust (1920)
- Generace (1921)
- Dezertér (1923)
- Husa na provázku (1925)
- Praha-Brno-Bratislava (1927)
- Nasredin čili Nedokonalá pomsta (1930)
- Rodina 1933 (1934)
- Mezi dvěma bouřkami (1938)

=== Essays ===
- Před oponou (1920)
- Rybářská knížka (1921)
- Režisérův zápisník (1923)
- Kniha o českém charakteru (1924)
- Kapitola o předválečné generaci (1934)

=== Poetry ===
- Plamínky (1907)
- Balady (1908)
- Duha (1916)
- Tiché srdce (1916)
- Scirocco (1923)
- Rozloučení s jihem (1934)

=== Other ===
- Její pohádky (1914; second edition published in 1922 as Co mi liška vyprávěla) – fairy tales for children
- Knížka o čtení praktickém (1924) – librarianship manual for libraries and readers
- Nutnosti a možnosti veřejných knihoven (1925) – analysis of needs in librarianship

== Honours and legacy ==
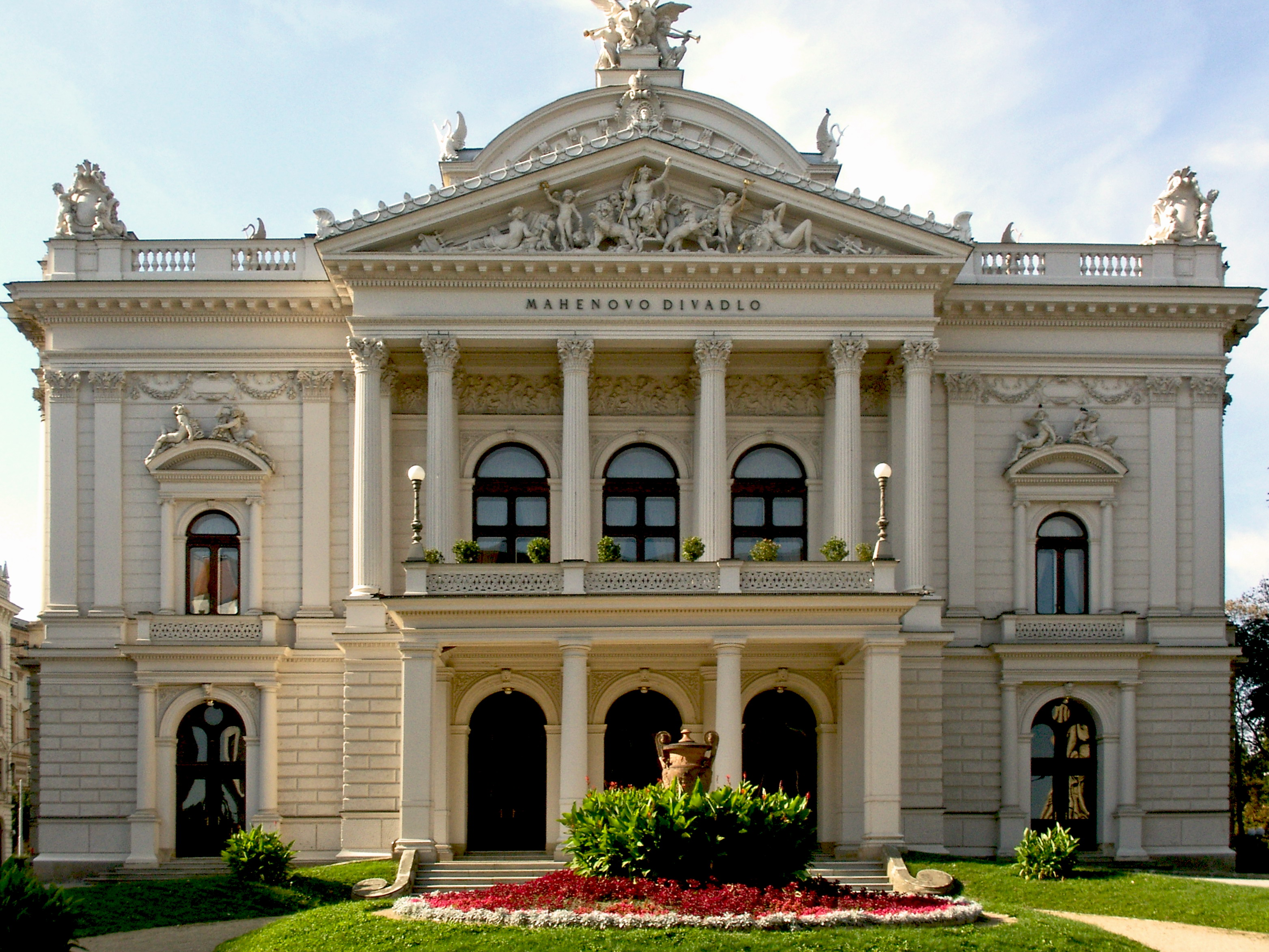
Mahen Theatre in Brno

The municipal library of Brno was named "Jiří Mahen Library in Brno" after Mahen. The library also includes the Mahen Memorial. The memorial consists of Mahen's preserved study room, an exhibition about his life and work, and a space for literary programs.

In 1993, the Jiří Mahen Society was founded in Brno. its goal is to actively participate in cultural life and continue Mahen's ideals, such as literature, theatre, librarianship, and environmental care.

The Mahen Theatre in Brno has been named after Jiří Mahen since 1965. The Husa na provázku Theatre (literally 'goose on a string') in Brno was named after one of Mahen's works.

Several cities and towns in the Czech Republic have a street named after Jiří Mahen, including Prague (Košíře), Brno, Ostrava and Ústí nad Labem.

== See also ==
- List of Czech writers
