= Maloměřice =

- Cadastral territory of Brno
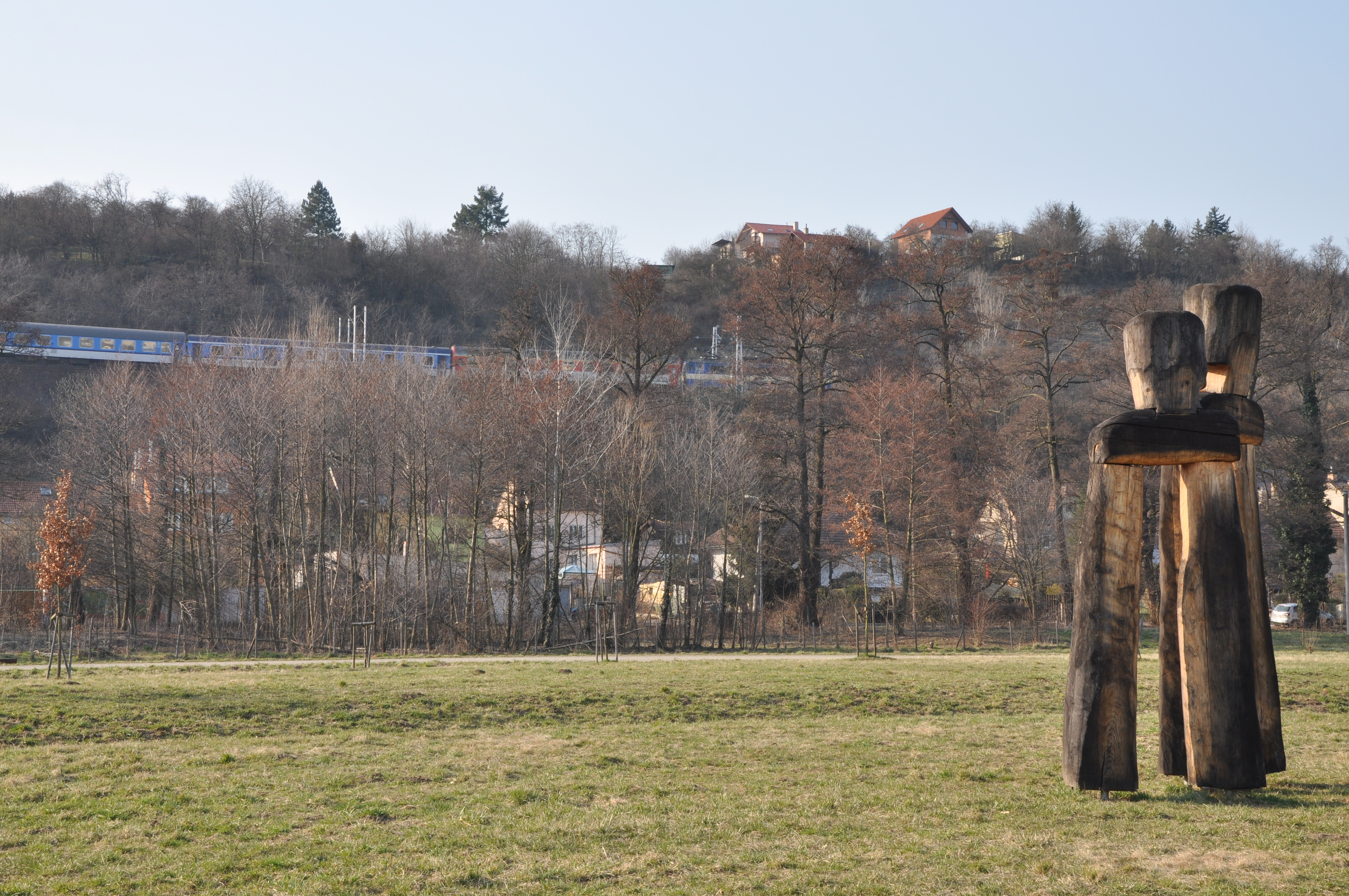
- The island Cacovický ostrov

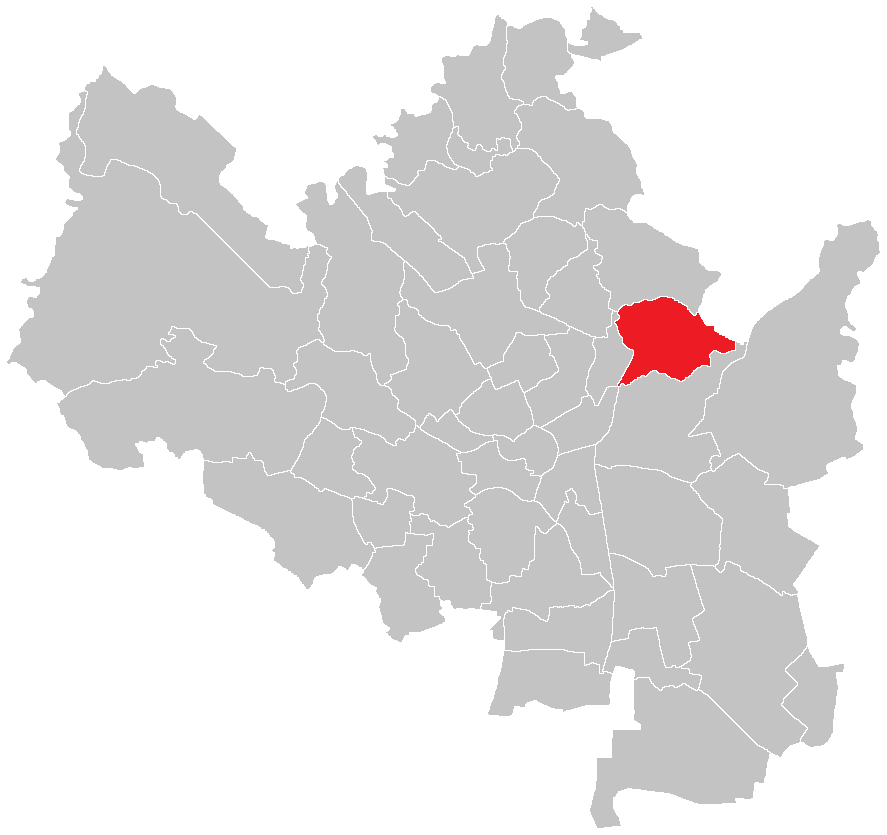
- Location of Maloměřice in Brno
- Coordinates: 49°13′14″N 16°38′36″E
- Country: Czech Republic
- Region: South Moravian
- City: Brno
- City districts: Brno-Maloměřice and Obřany, Brno-Vinohrady

Area
  - Total: 4.06 km^{2} (1.57 sq mi)

Population (2021)
  - Total: 3,363
  - Density: 828/km^{2} (2,150/sq mi)
- Time zone: UTC+1 (CET)
  - Summer (DST): UTC+2 (CEST)
- Postal code: 614 00

Maloměřice (German: Malmeritz) is a municipal part and cadastral territory on the northeastern edge of the city of Brno, Czech Republic. About 3,300 people live here. Originally an independent municipality, it was annexed to Brno in 1919, since 24 November 1990 it is part of the city district of Brno-Maloměřice and Obřany. The small southern part of Maloměřice belongs to Brno-Vinohrady.

== Geography ==
Maloměřice borders the cadastral territories of Obřany to the north, Husovice to the west, Zábrdovice to the south, Židenice to the south and southeast, and the municipality of Kanice to the northeast.

Maloměřice has an area of 4.06 km². The district has the character of a large village or town. It is located in the northeastern part of the city in the valley of the Svitava river, mostly on the left bank, except for the Cacovický ostrov island and its territory extends to the southwestern slope of the Hády massif, where there is an extensive system of limestone quarries, mined until the end of the 20th century for processing in the local cement plant.

== History ==
In Maloměřice, a significant hoard with bronze fittings from the Latène period was discovered in 1941.

During the period of Moravian principality, there were significant settlements in the area of Maloměřice, Obřany and Židenice. The village of Maloměřice was created in the river floodplain on the left bank of the Svitava, as a street on the road from Židenice to Obřany, which was joined at the southern end of the village by the road from neighbouring Husovice. Originally a feudal village, it was donated to the Benedictine monastery in Třebíč in the 12th century by Wratislaus of Brno. In the years 1843–1849, a railway line from Brno to Česká Třebová was built along the eastern edge of the original village. On 16 April 1919, Maloměřice was annexed to Brno.

In 1946, a collection centre for the deportation of Germans was established in Maloměřice. In 1953, a new railway route from Brno to Prague was completed, a new marshalling yard was built in Maloměřice, and along with that, the original railway line further west was cancelled. At the same time, the new station cut off the family development located east of it. In the second half of the 1960s, during the second cadastral reform of Brno, the border with the cadastral territory of Židenice was significantly modified, during which, among other things, the street Baarovo nábřeží, originally belonging to the former village of Juliánov, was joined to Maloměřice.

In the second half of the 1980s, the Vinohrady housing estate encroached on the southern edge of Maloměřice. As of 28 March 2015, it was transferred to the cadastral territory Židenice and city district Brno-Vinohrady, and only some adjacent garages remained in Maloměřice.

== Demographics ==
Historical population

Year	Pop.	±%
1869	878	—
1880	1,047	+19.2%
1890	1,606	+53.4%
1900	2,210	+37.6%
1910	3,166	+43.3%

Year	Pop.	±%
1921	3,644	+15.1%
1930	4,891	+34.2%
1950	4,550	−7.0%
1961	4,319	−5.1%
1970	4,186	−3.1%

Year	Pop.	±%
1980	3,027	−27.7%
1991	2,432	−19.7%
2001	2,459	+1.1%
2011	3,042	+23.7%
2021	3,363	+10.6%

Source: Censuses

== Transport ==
Maloměřice is connected with other parts of Brno by public transport via tram line 4, which runs through the whole district up to the vicinity of Obřany, and bus lines number 75 during the day and 94 during the night, both continue to Obřany.

The separated part of Maloměřice east of the marshalling station is served by bus lines 64 and 74. Bus lines 44, 53 and 84, and trolleybus lines 25 and 26 pass through the southwestern edge of Maloměřice, along the large city ring, without stopping.

The southern edge of Maloměřice adjacent to Brno-Vinohrady is served by trolleybus lines 25, 26, 27, at stop Vlčnovská.

Although a considerable part of Maloměřice consists of the marshalling station Brno-Maloměřice, all passenger trains only pass through here. The nearest stop is Brno-Židenice.

== Religion ==
A chapel stands in the centre of the district on Prošková náměstí. In Maloměřice, there is a religious community of the Czechoslovak Hussite Church, which in 1951 separated from the now dissolved community in Husovice. For the first few years, it had no place of worship here, only an office at Selská 86. In 1958, it bought a former inn at Selská 53 and rebuilt it into a prayer hall, today called the Bethlem congregation house. People from the Czechoslovak Hussite Church are also behind the building of the house of dignity for old age on Borky street. A preaching station of the Unity of the Brethren Baptists also operated in Maloměřice.

== Sport ==
In 2016, a sports hall with a capacity of 360 people was opened behind Hamry primary school. Floorball, futsal and handball matches are regularly held in the hall.
