= Stanislav Kostka Neumann =

Czech poet (1875–1947)

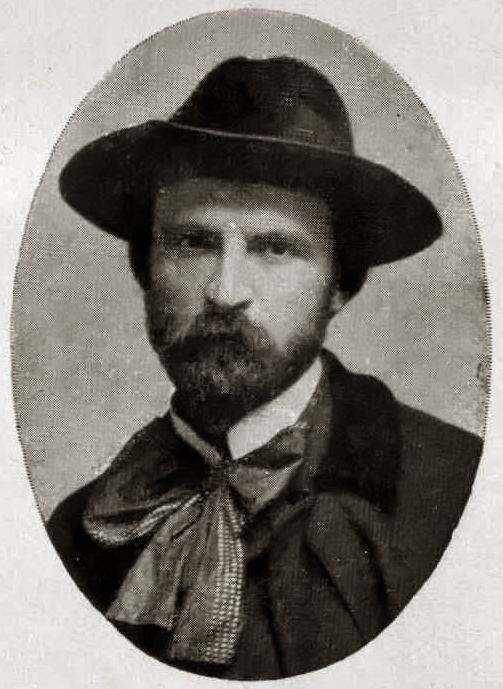
- Born: Stanislav Jan Konstantin Václav Bohudar; 5 June 1875; Prague, Bohemia, Austria-Hungary
- Died: 28 June 1947 (aged 72); Prague, Czechoslovakia
- Occupation: Poet

Stanislav Kostka Neumann (born Stanislav Jan Konstantin Václav Bohudar; 5 June 1875 – 28 June 1947) was a Czech poet, literary critic, journalist and translator. He was known for his anarchist and communist views, which influenced his work. He is the father of the actor Stanislav Neumann.

== Biography ==
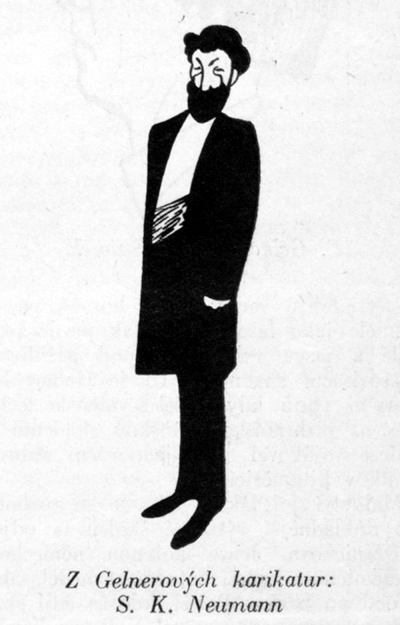
Caricature of S. K. Neumann by František Gellner

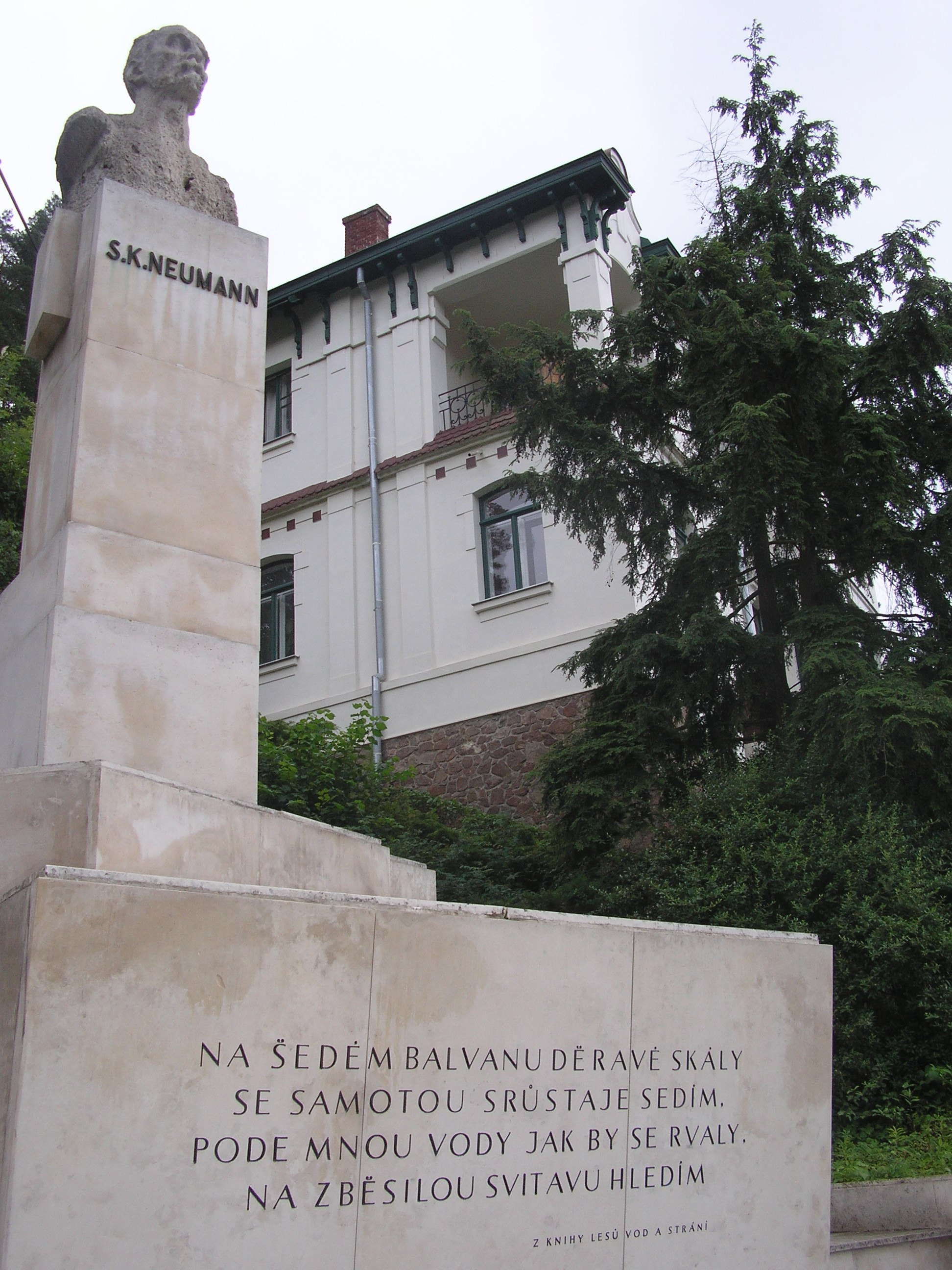
Memorial of S. K. Neumann in Bílovice nad Svitavou

Stanislav Kostka Neumann was born on 5 June 1875 in Prague, Austria-Hungary. His father, a lawyer and member of Imperial Council, died when Stanislav was five years old. Stanislav was raised by his mother and aunts. He studied a gymnasium in Prague, but did not graduate. He was arrested in 1893 for his anarchist tendencies and sentenced to fourteen months in prison. He served his sentence in Plzeň-Bory.

From 1897 to 1905, he worked as the chief editor of his own magazine, Nový kult ('new cult'), which brought together Czech anarchists.Neumann's villa in Prague-Žižkov (called Olšanská vila) became a place where Neumann's literary and anarchist friends met, including František Gellner, Karel Toman, Marie Majerová, Fráňa Šrámek, Viktor Dyk, Jiří Mahen and Rudolf Těsnohlídek.

In 1905, Neumann shortly lived in Vienna, but then he moved to Řečkovice (today part of Brno). In 1907, he moved to Bílovice nad Svitavou. He lived there until 1915. From 1915 to 1917, during World War I, Neumann served as a soldier in the medical corps during the campaign in Albania and Macedonia. After the war, he moved back to Prague. He was married twice. He is the father of the actor Stanislav Neumann (1902–1975).

Neumann wrote his first poems in jail in 1893. He has undergone many stages of creative: symbolist (I Am an Apostle of the New Life), anarchist (A Dream About a Crowd of Desperate People, and Other Verses), landscape lyric (The Book of Forests, Hills, and Waters), civilist (New Songs), communist (Red Songs) and others. He helped found the Communist Party of Czechoslovakia.

Neumann died on 28 June 1947 in Prague, aged 72. He was buried at Vyšehrad Cemetery, but in 2021, his grave was moved to Olšany Cemetery.

== Work ==
His collections of poems include:

- Jsem apoštol nového žití ('I Am an Apostle of the New Life'; 1896)
- Sen o zástupu zoufajících a jiné básně ('A Dream About a Crowd of Desperate People, and Other Verses'; 1903)
- České zpěvy ('Czech Songs'; 1910)
- Kniha lesů, vod a strání ('The Book of Forests, Hills, and Waters'; 1914)
- Nové zpěvy ('New Songs'; 1918)
- Třicet zpěvů z rozvratu ('Thirty Songs of Times of Ruin'; 1918)
- Rudé zpěvy ('Red Songs'; 1923)
- Láska ('Love'; 1933)
- Srdce a mračna ('Heart and Clouds'; 1935)
- Sonáta horizontálního života ('Sonata of Earthly Horizons'; 1937)
- Bezedný rok ('Bottomless Year'; 1945)
- Zamořená léta ('Plague-ridden Years'; 1946)

Neumann also devoted himself to translating works from French and Russian.

== Honours ==
In 1964, a monument to Stanislav Kostka Neumann, created by Vincenc Makovský, was unveiled in Bílovice nad Svitavou.

Dozens of cities and towns in the Czech Republic have a street named after Stanislav Kostka Neumann, including Prague (Zbraslav), Brno, Ostrava, Plzeň, Olomouc, České Budějovice and Hradec Králové.
