= Palonín =

- Municipality
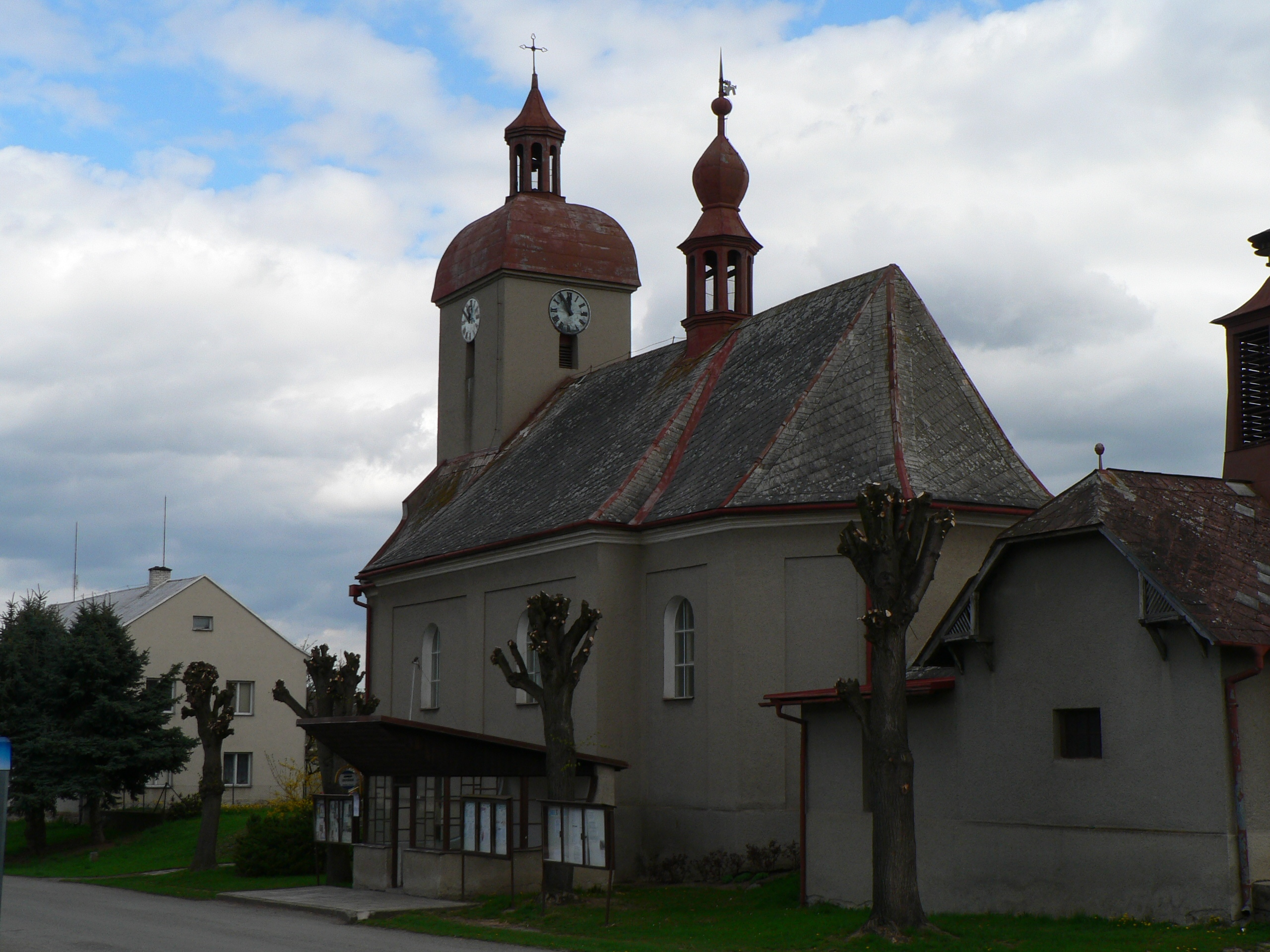
- Church of Saint Joseph

- Flag Coat of arms

- Location in the Czech Republic
- Coordinates: 49°43′44″N 16°57′10″E
- Country: Czech Republic
- Region: Olomouc
- District: Šumperk
- First mentioned: 1353

Area
  - Total: 5.37 km^{2} (2.07 sq mi)
- Elevation: 272 m (892 ft)

Population (2026-01-01)
  - Total: 346
  - Density: 64.4/km^{2} (167/sq mi)
- Time zone: UTC+1 (CET)
  - Summer (DST): UTC+2 (CEST)
- Postal codes: 789 83
- Website: www.palonin.cz

Palonín is a municipality and village in Šumperk District in the Olomouc Region of the Czech Republic. As of the beginning of 2025, there were 344 inhabitants.

Palonín lies approximately 27 kilometres (17 mi) south of Šumperk, 26 km (16 mi) north-west of Olomouc, and 187 km (116 mi) east of Prague.

== Demographics ==
Historical population
| Year | Pop. | ±% |
|---|---|---|
| 1869 | 495 | — |
| 1880 | 578 | +16.8% |
| 1890 | 516 | −10.7% |
| 1900 | 582 | +12.8% |
| 1910 | 557 | −4.3% |
| 1921 | 547 | −1.8% |
| 1930 | 537 | −1.8% |
| 1950 | 402 | −25.1% |
| 1961 | 411 | +2.2% |
| 1970 | 411 | +0.0% |
| 1980 | 381 | −7.3% |
| 1991 | 358 | −6.0% |
| 2001 | 333 | −7.0% |
| 2011 | 333 | +0.0% |
| 2021 | 331 | −0.6% |
Source: Censuses

== Notable people ==
- Stanislav Lolek (1873–1936), painter and illustrator
