= Stanislav Lolek =

Czech painter, illustrator and comics artist

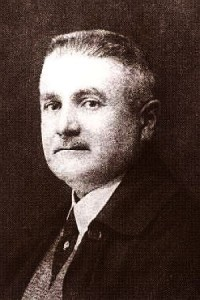
Stanislav Lolek (before 1930)

Stanislav Lolek (13 November 1873 in Palonín – 9 May 1936 in Uherské Hradiště) was a Czech painter, illustrator and comics artist, best known for his illustrations in the serialized novella (daily comic) Liška Bystrouška.

== Career ==
He originally studied forestry at a school in Písek, then worked as a forester at an estate near Lnáře. While there, he began adding illustrations to his maps. He was then advised to study painting at the Academy of Fine Arts, Prague, where his primary Professor was Julius Mařák. He later studied graphic art in Munich; specializing in landscapes and animals.

The editor of the newspaper Lidové Noviny passed on some of Lolek's illustrations of a rural tale about a gamekeeper and a vixen to Czech author Rudolf Těsnohlídek and their collaboration (literally translated as Vixen Sharp-ears) appeared in the newspaper from 7 April to 23 June 1920, later being expanded into a novel by Těsnohlídek. The story was used as the basis for Leoš Janáček's opera The Cunning Little Vixen (Příhody Lišky Bystroušky, 1923).

== Selected paintings ==
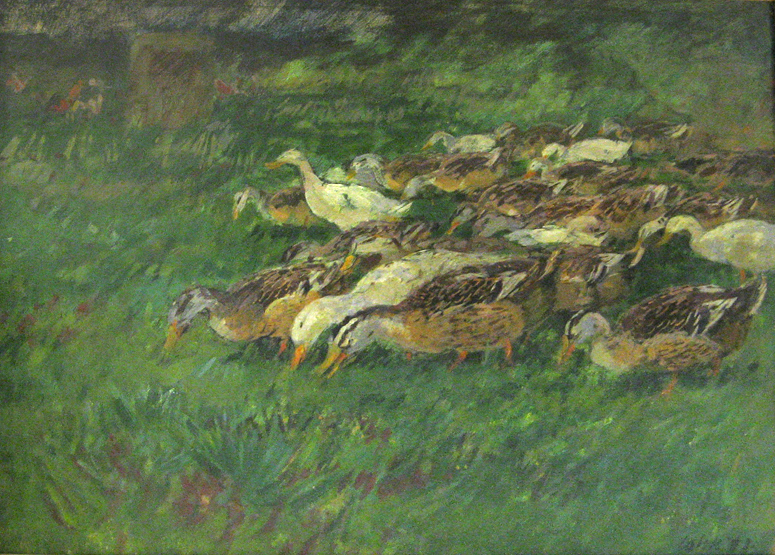
Ducks

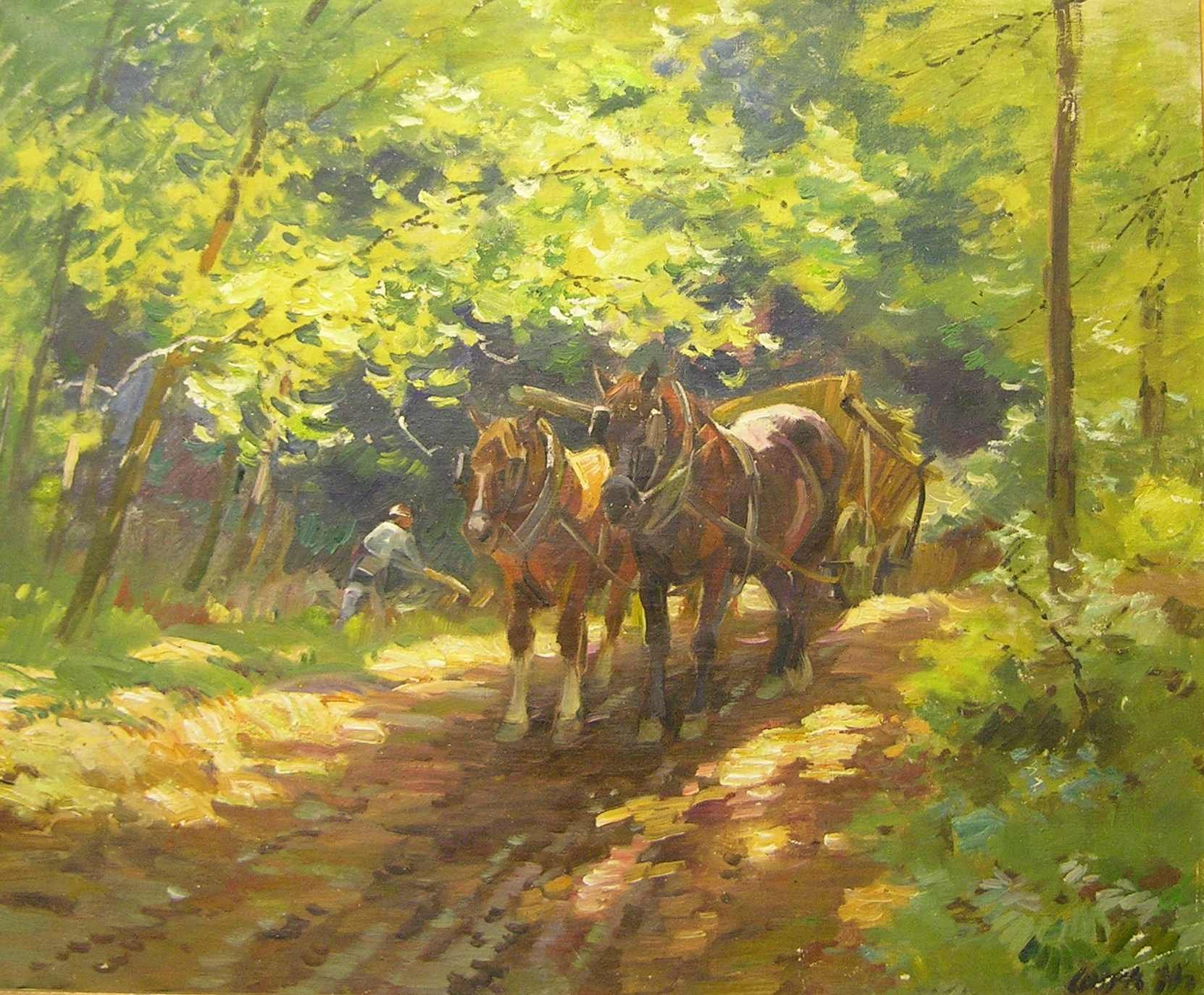
Forest with Horses

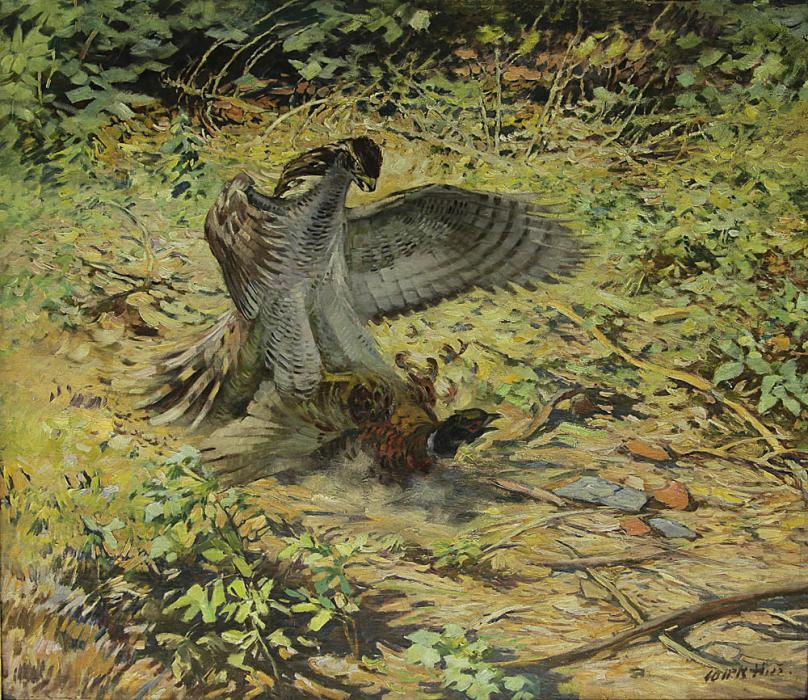
Hawk on the Attack

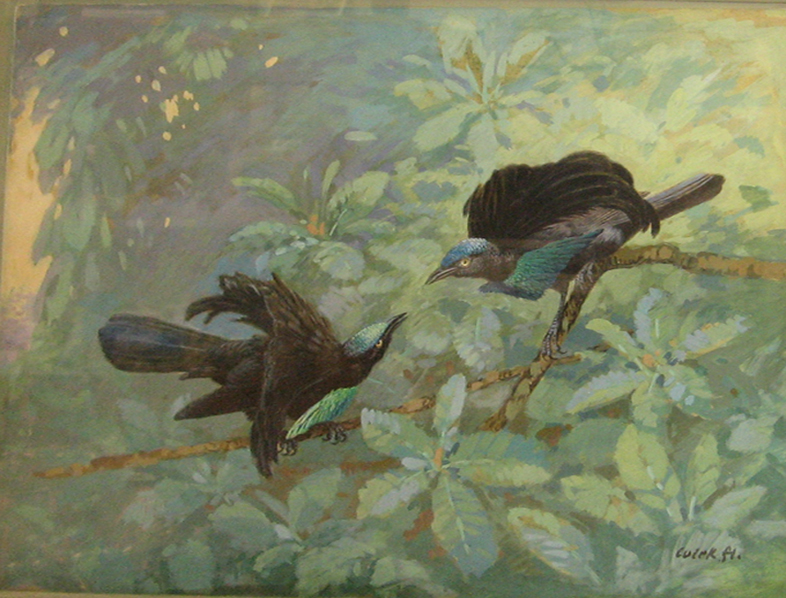
Birds
