= Otakar Diblík =

Czech industrial designer

- Born: 19 August 1929; Brno
- Died: 12 February 1999 (aged 69); Prague
- Occupation: Industrial designer

Otakar Diblík (19 August 1929 – 12 February 1999) was a Czech industrial designer.

== Life ==
From 1948 to 1952, Diblík studied architecture and civil engineering at the Technical University of Dr. E. Beneš (now Brno University of Technology). He was a pupil of Vincenc Makovský. While at school, he began to devote himself to design. He began his work at Karosa Vysoké Mýto, where he collaborated on the design of the Škoda 706 RTO bus. He notably designed the interior of the De Luxe version for Expo 58 in Brussels. Beginning in 1959 he worked at Tatra, where he worked with other designers on the modernisation of the Tatra T-603. When the project was moved to the new Tatra department in Bratislava, he collaborated with that team as well. However, none of his work at Tatra was realised and mass-produced.

He designed the Electric Locomotive 230 with a body made of laminate. His other work for Czechoslovak companies included designing the interior of the Let L-200 Morava aircraft and designing the Zetor Crystal tractor. In 1968 he emigrated and settled in Italy. Starting the following year, he worked as a designer at the studio of his friend Rodolfo Bonetto, who helped him after emigration. In 1983 he became the chief designer of the studio. From 1990 he worked as the head of the design studio of the Academy of Arts, Architecture and Design in Prague (VŠUP).

He died of heart failure in the studio at VŠUP in 1999.

== Work ==
- Interior of Škoda 706 RTO Brussels
- Interior of the aircraft Let L-200 Morava
- Škoda 440 Karosa
- Caravan Dingo
- Tractor Zetor Crystal
- Electric Locomotive 230
- Romayor printing machine
- FLU lamp
- Offset machine Polly 74
- Public payphone Rotor

== Gallery ==
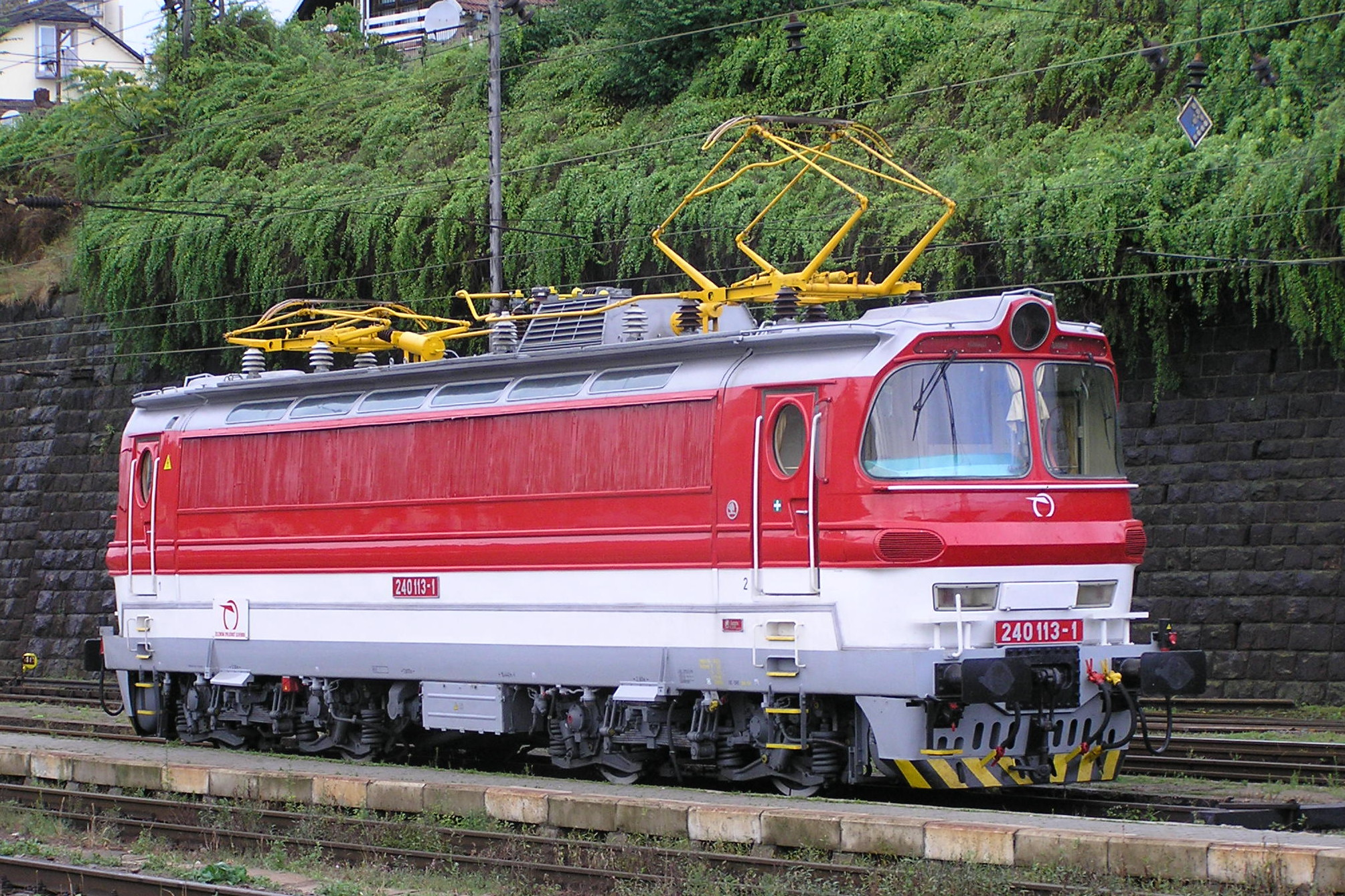
Electric Locomotive 240

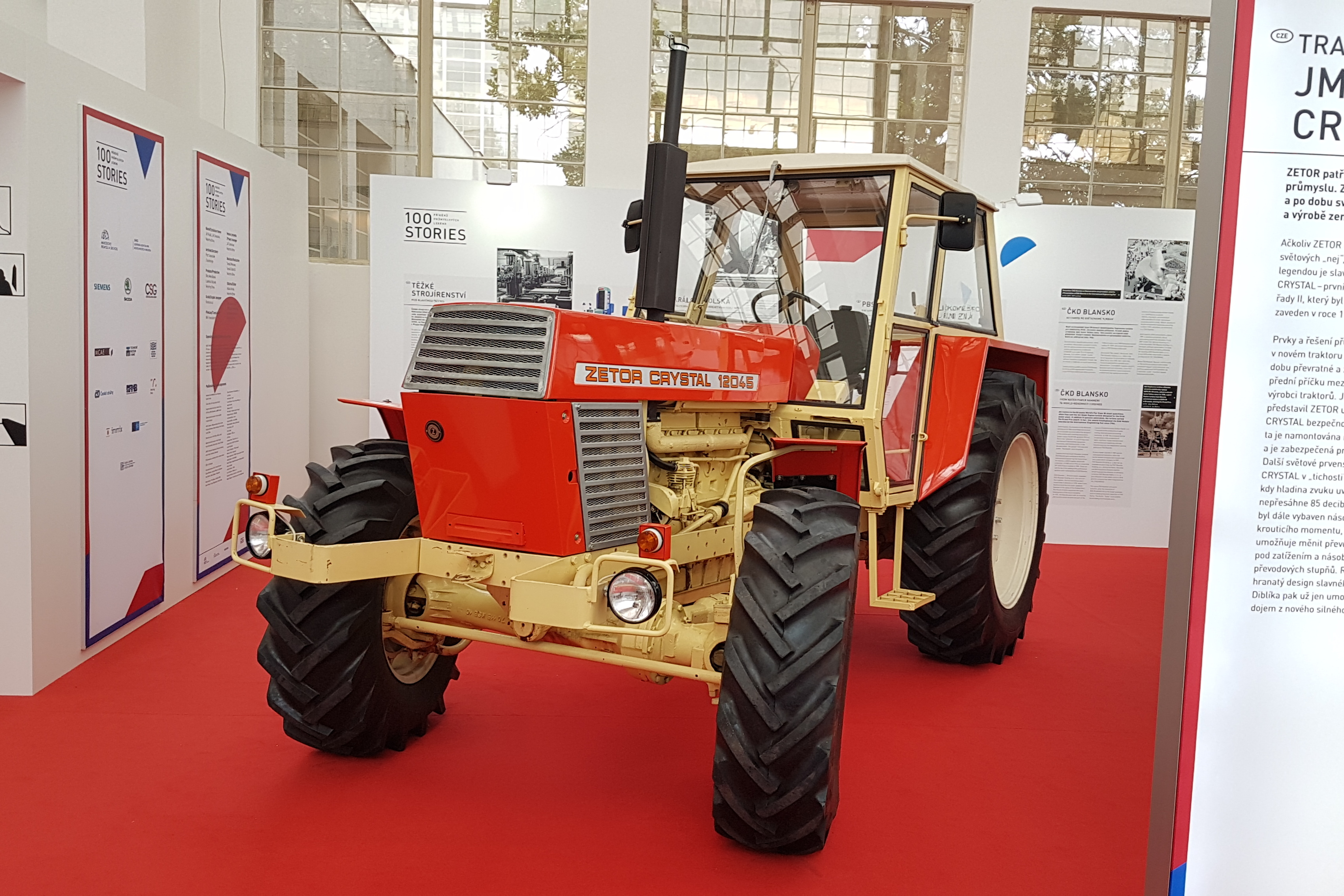
Tractor Zetor Crystal

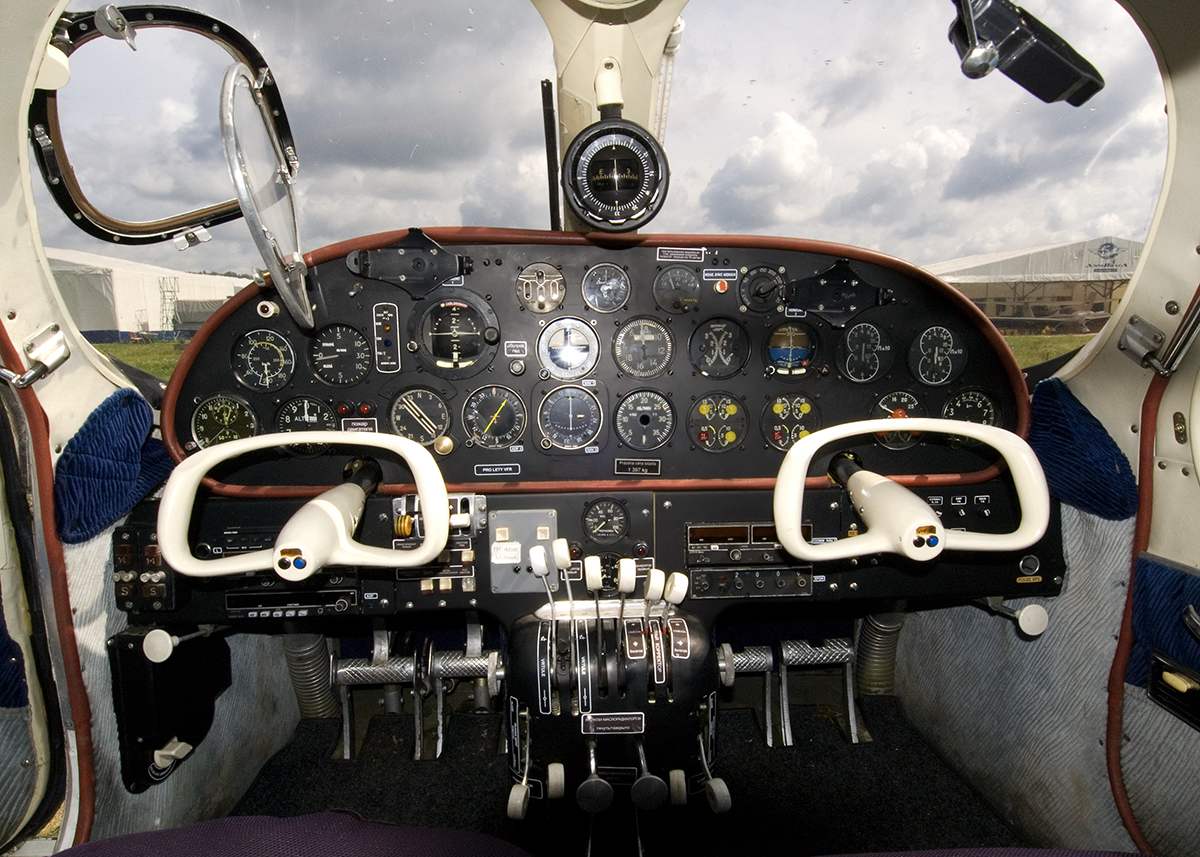
Interior of Let 200 Morava
