= Vincenc Makovský =

Czech sculptor and industrial designer (1900–1966)

- Born: 3 June 1900; Nové Město na Moravě, Moravia, Austria-Hungary
- Died: 28 December 1966 (aged 66); Brno, Czechoslovakia
- Resting place: Evangelical Cemetery, Nové Město na Moravě
- Education: Academy of Fine Arts, Prague
- Known for: sculpture

Vincenc Makovský (3 June 1900 – 28 December 1966) was a Czech sculptor, industrial designer and university teacher.

== Biography ==
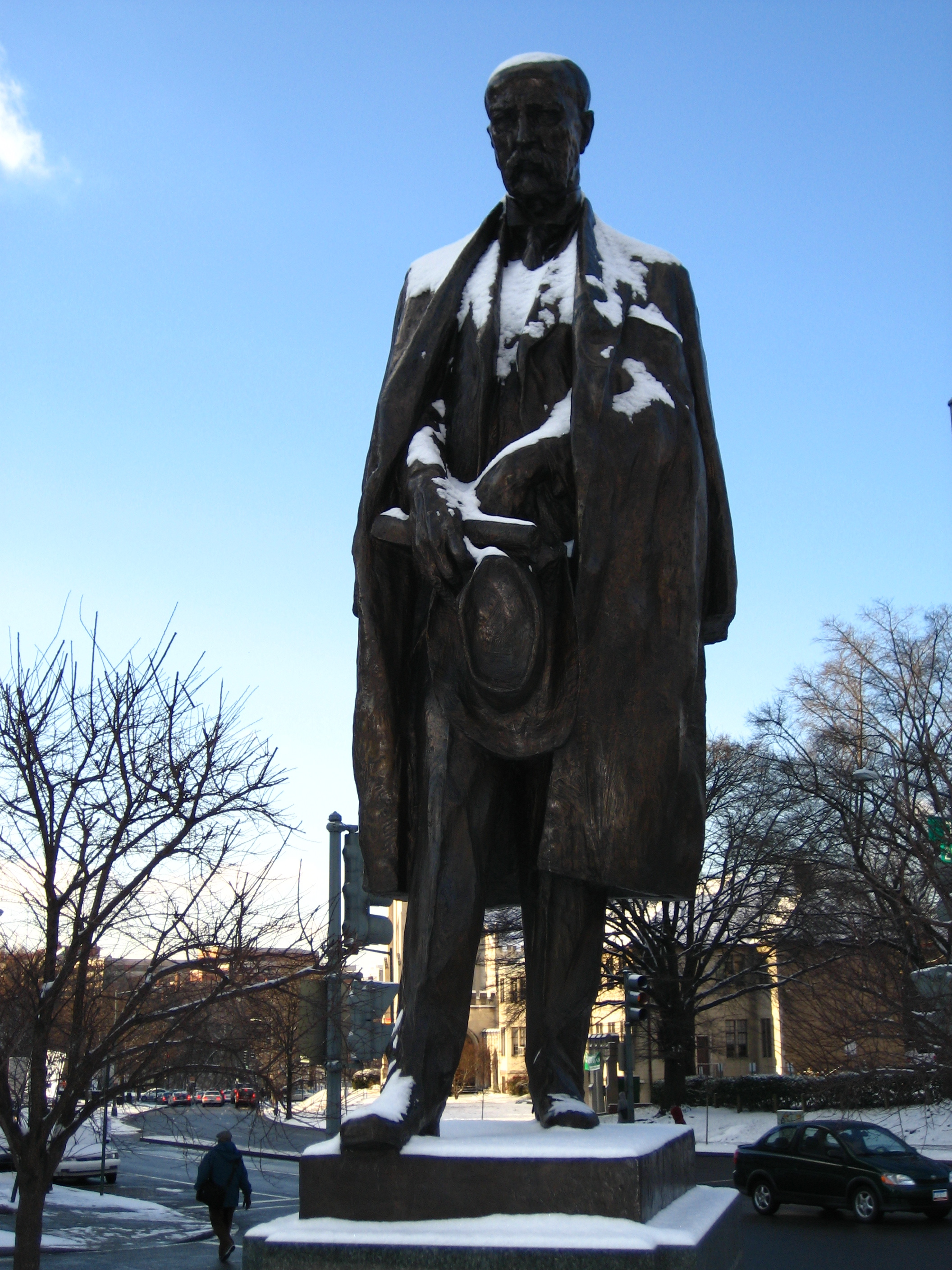
Statue of Tomáš Garrigue Masaryk in Washington, D.C. (1937)

Vincenc Makovský was born on 3 June 1900 in Nové Město na Moravě. After he graduated from the high school in his hometown in 1918, he studied at the Academy of Fine Arts in Prague in 1919–1926. He was a pupil of Jan Štursa, who was also native of Nové Město na Moravě. In 1926–1930, he worked at Antoine Bourdelle's studio in France. From 1930, he lived in Brno. In 1944, he married. He had two sons.

In 1929–1949, Makovský was a member of Mánes Union of Fine Arts. He founded the School of Arts in Zlín in 1939 and taught there until 1945. In 1945–1952, he taught at Brno University of Technology (that time called University of Technology of Dr. E. Beneš). From 1952, he was a university teacher at Academy of Fine Arts in Prague. Among his students were Otakar Diblík and Stanislav Hanzík.

He died on 28 December 1966 in Brno. He is buried at the Evangelical Cemetery in Nové Město na Moravě.

== Sculptural work ==
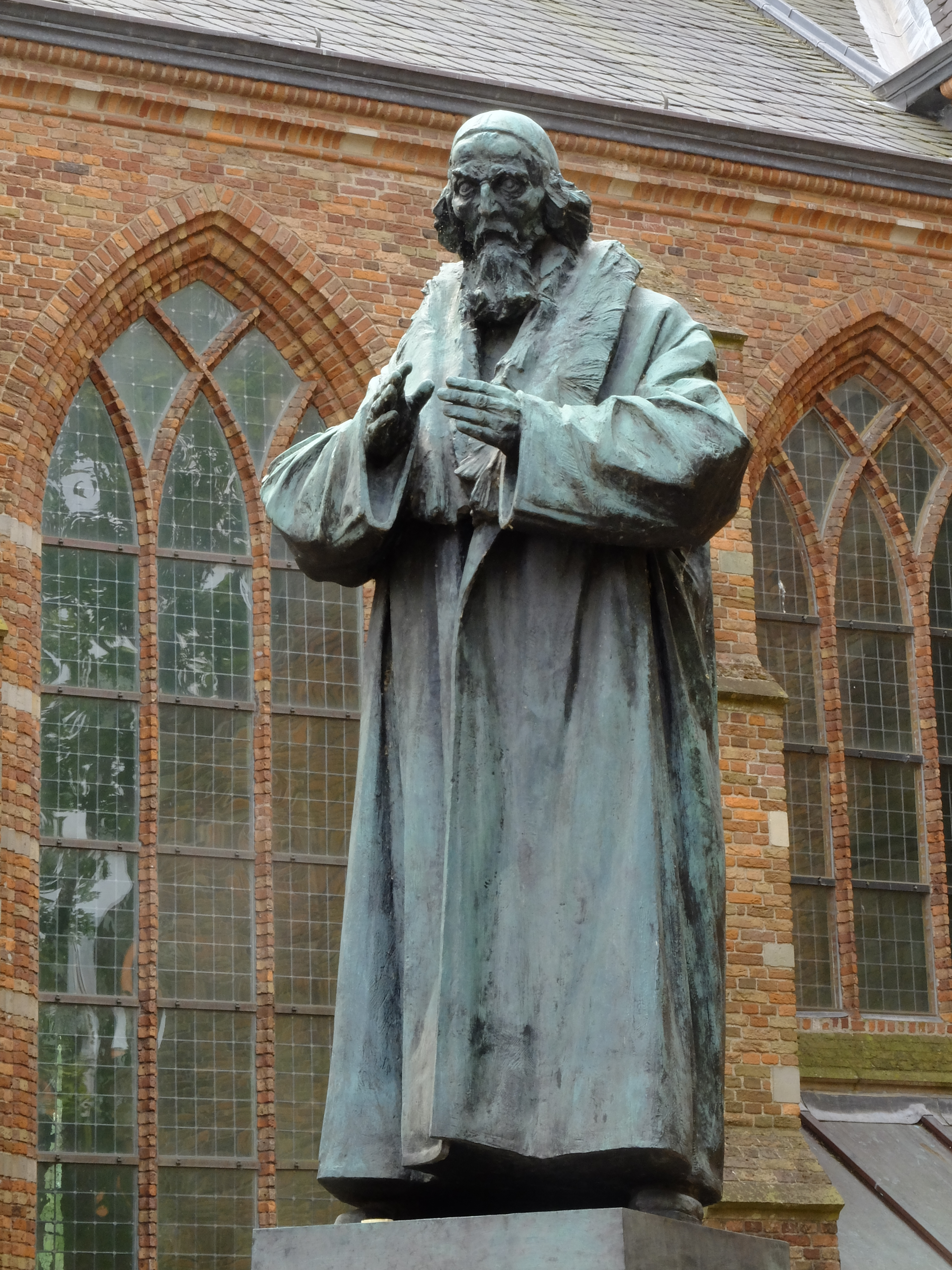
Statue of Comenius in Naarden (1957)

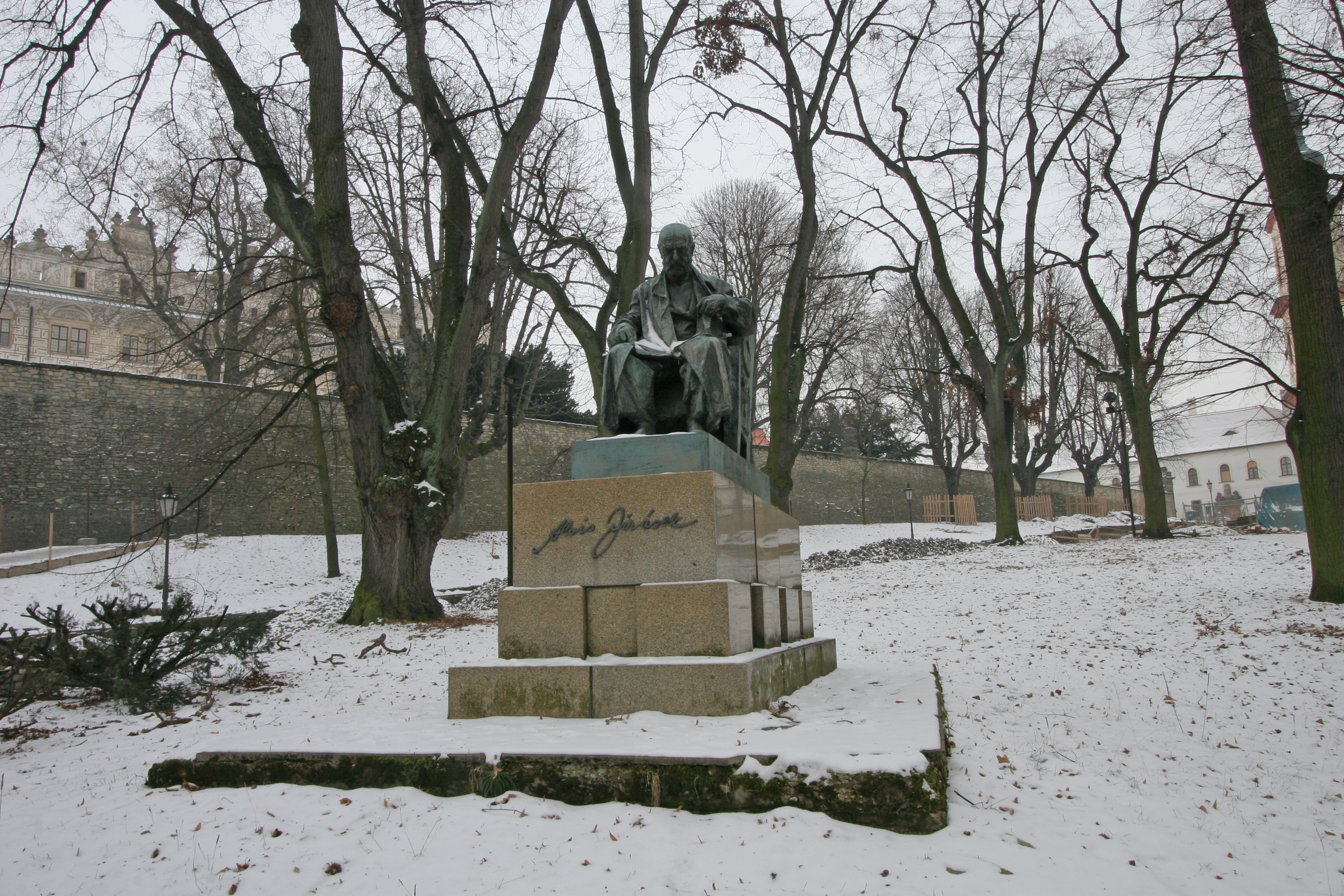
Monument of Alois Jirásek in Litomyšl (1959)

Vincenc Makovský was the most prominent representative of surrealism in Czech sculpture, although his surrealist period only lasted from 1932 to 1934. This period also included radical material experiments. Some of his surrealist works are exhibited in the National Gallery Prague.

After World War II, Makovský focused primarily on creation of monuments. The ruling communist regime respected Makovský's efforts to connect architecture and public space in a valuable work. Among the best-known examples of his work from this period is the monument of Alois Jirásek in Litomyšl from 1959.

Many of his works are protected as cultural monuments of the Czech Republic. Among the most significant works are:

- Statue of Tomáš Garrigue Masaryk in Washington, D.C., 1937
- Fountain with a sculpture group Vintage in Mělník, 1938
- Allegorical statue Průmysl ('Industry') in Prague-Vysočany, 1938
- Bust of Tomáš Garrigue Masaryk in Mouřínov, 1940s
- Monument to the victims of World War II in Krucemburk, 1946
- Monument to Marshal Rodion Yakovlevich Malinovsky in Brno, 1950
- Red Army monument in Brno, 1955, together with Bohuslav Fuchs and Antonín Kurial
- Statue of Comenius in Naarden, 1957
- Monument of Alois Jirásek in Litomyšl, 1959
- Bust of John Amos Comenius in Brno, 1961
- Memorial to Stanislav Kostka Neumann in Bílovice nad Svitavou, 1964

== Industrial design ==
Makovský was also known as an industrial designer. In 1940, he created the first 1:1-scale plaster model of the R50 lathe, in cooperation with designers of the engineering works MAS. In 1941, he designed the first Czech radial drilling machine, known as the VR8.

== Honours ==
Makovský received several awards from the Czechoslovak state for his work.

The gymnasium in Nové Město na Moravě bears Makovský's name. A square in Žabovřesky district of Brno is named after him. In Prague-Řepy, one of the main streets is named Makovského after him.
