= Brno-Maloměřice and Obřany =

- City District of Brno
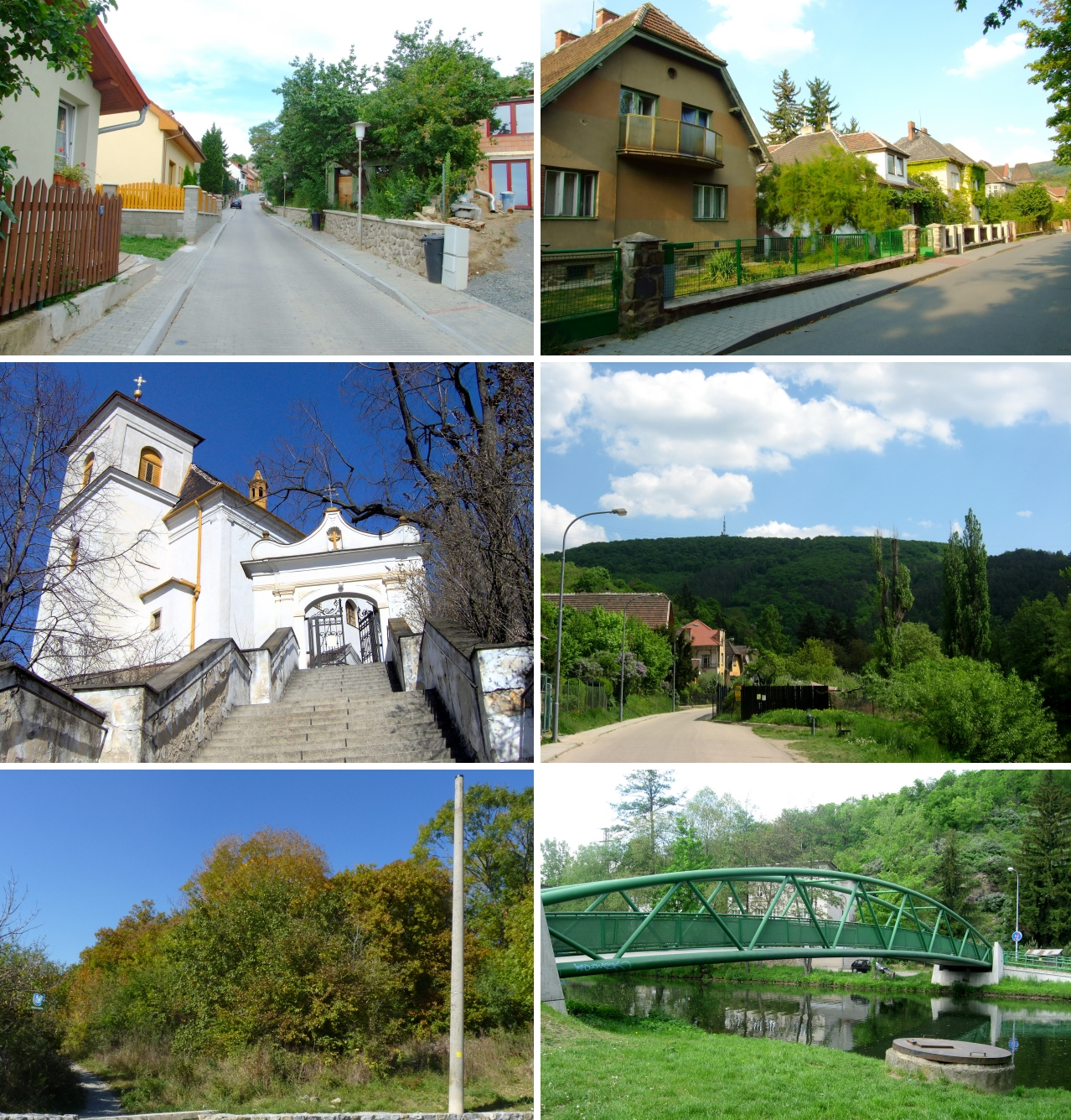

- Flag Coat of arms

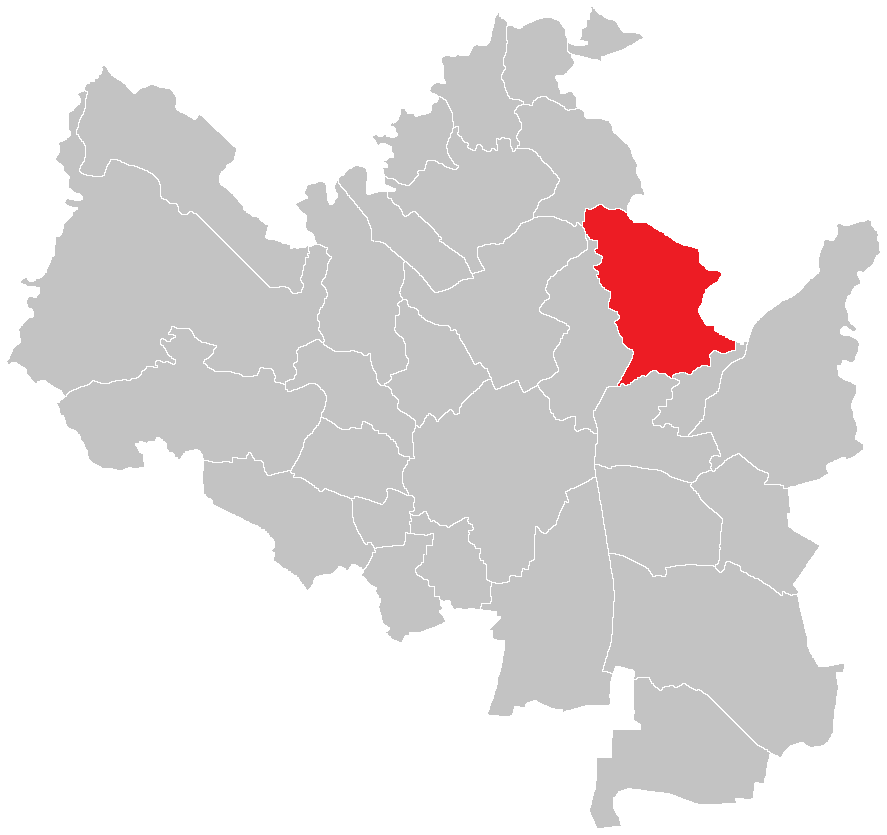
- Location of Brno-Maloměřice a Obřany in Brno 49°13′26″N 16°38′38″E
- Country: Czech Republic
- Region: South Moravian Region
- City: Brno

Government
  - Mayor: Ludmila Kutálková

Area
  - Total: 9.29 km^{2} (3.59 sq mi)

Population (2023)
  - Total: 6,253
  - Density: 673/km^{2} (1,740/sq mi)
- Time zone: UTC+1 (CET)
  - Summer (DST): UTC+2 (CEST)
- Postal code: 614 00
- Website: https://www.malomerice.cz/

Brno-Maloměřice and Obřany (Czech: Brno-Maloměřice a Obřany) is a city district of Brno, Czech Republic, located in the northeastern part of the city. It consists of the cadastral territory of Obřany and most of the cadastral territory of Maloměřice. The total cadastral area is 9.29 km^{2}. The city district was established on November 24, 1990. About 6,000 people live here.

It stretches along both banks of the river Svitava near Hády hill, the cadastral border between the two districts runs through the middle of the river and Mlýnský mill. For the purposes of the senate elections, Brno-Maloměřice and Obřany is included in electoral district number 58 of the Brno-City District.

== Etymology ==
Historians believe that the local name Maloměřice was probably created by adding the suffix -ice to the personal name Maloměr (also Malomir) in the meaning "village of Maloměr people". In the case of Obřany, the name of the village comes from the general name obr, obří (lit. 'Giant'), or from the personal name Obr. In the 20th century, at the very beginning of the German occupation in 1939, the deviant ancient German name Oberseß was introduced, apparently meaning Upper or Higher settlement.

== History ==
A hoard from the Latène period was found in Maloměřice.

On the territory of the modern-day area of Brno-Maloměřice an Obřany there was a significant settlement in the time of the Moravian principality. The territory of the modern town originally belonged mainly to the cadastral territories of Maloměřice an Obřany, but the peripheral parts also belonged to Židenice, Husovice, Bílovice nad Svitavou (the forest above the right bank of the Svitava valley) and Kanice. The two main settlements, which are Maloměřice an Obřany, were already established in the Middle Ages. In 1241, the Mongols invaded Moravia and ravaged and burned Maloměřice that year. Only at the end of the 13th century were Maloměřice restored. Another serious damage to Maloměřice followed during the siege of Brno by the Swedes in 1645. Due to the change of Obřany, both events mentioned above did not affect them much. In the second half of the 19th century, the development of Baar's embankment was built, then belonging to the village of Juliánov (never had its own cadastre, but fell under Židenice), called "Juliánov near Husovice". The villages of Maloměřice, Ořany, Husovice, Juliánov and Židenice were annexed to Brno on April 16, 1919, but the lands originally belonging to Bílovice nad Svitavou and Kanice were annexed to Brno at the end of the 1960s. During this reambulation, almost all current sections of the borders of these cadastral territories were also newly established. Further adjustments followed in the 1970s (a change in the border between Obřany and Lesná municipalities, during which a line forming the modern border of the city district with the neighboring Brno-North district was established) and on November 26, 1998 (a small change in the border between the cadastral areas of Maloměřice and Židenice in the neighboring district of Brno-Vinohrady).

People from Maloměřice were called čučkaři because lentils were grown here, and fazuláci to the inhabitants of Obřany because they grew beans.

== Administrative evolution ==
1945 – December 31, 1946 – MNV (Local committee) Maloměřice, MNV Obřany operated on the territory of the modern city districts of Brno-Maloměřice an Obřany within Brno, a small part fell under the jurisdiction of MNV Židenice. The peripheral parts were part of the municipalities of Bílovice nad Svitavou and Kanice.

1947–1949 – the majority of the modern city district was part of the Brno V municipal district within Brno, the Židenice lands fell into the Brno VI district. The peripheral parts were part of the municipalities of Bílovice nad Svitavou and Kanice.

1949–1954 – minor change occurred during this period. At that time, still in Židenice, Baar's embankment was administratively separated from Židenice and, together with most of the territory of the modern city districts of Brno-Maloměřice an Obřany, was incorporated into district Brno VIII, which was essentially only a slightly modified version of the previous district Brno V. The rest of the then Židenice lands of modern The town district continued to be administered from Židenice, but the Židenice district was now labeled Brno IX. There was no change in the ownership of the non-Brno peripheral lands at the time and they were still part of the municipalities of Bílovice nad Svitavou and Kanice.

1954–1957 – administrative boundaries remained the same as in the previous period in the territory of the modern city districts of Brno-Maloměřice an Obřany. The difference was that the Židenice district became part of the larger Brno VI district. The Brno parts of the modern city districts of Brno-Maloměřice an Obřany were now part of the Brno III district.

May 20, 1957 – 1960 – There was a predecessor of the modern city district of Brno-Maloměřice an Obřany, which became the city district of Brno XIII-Maloměřice, which was headed not by a district national committee, but by a local national committee. This district included the lands of the modern district of Brno-Maloměřice an Obřany, which were part of the previous district of Brno III, with the exception of Baar embankment, which was still in Židenica, which was left in the district of Brno III. The other, then Židenic, parts of the modern city district of Brno-Maloměřice an Obřany remained part of the city district of Brno VI. Nothing has changed regarding the ownership of the non-Brno lands at that time.

1960–1964 – the only difference compared to the previous division was the connection of the Baar embankment to the Maloměřice district, which was now called Maloměřice.

1964–1971 – almost everything as in the previous period, but the Brno VI municipal district was abolished and incorporated into the Brno IV municipal district. During this period, however, as part of the reambulation, the border of Brno was changed, which in the case of the Maloměřice district meant the annexation of land that previously belonged to the municipalities of Kamenice and Bílovice nad Svitavou.

November 26, 1971 – 1974 – administrative boundaries brought into line with cadastral boundaries newly established during reambulation. In this period, the entire territory of the modern city districts of Brno-Maloměřice an Obřany already belonged to one city district, which first bore the name Brno XIII – Maloměřice, from May 1, 1972 only Brno-Maloměřice.

January 1, 1975 until November 23, 1990, the territory of the modern district was part of the Brno III municipal district.

from November 24, 1990 – modern municipal district of Brno-Maloměřice an Obřany.

== Coat of Arms ==
The coat of arms is a horizontally bisected Gothic shield, in the upper field of which there are Maloměřice an Obřany signs on a green background, symbolized by a silver Gothic letter M and a silver winemaker's knife - kosír. The lower field of the coat of arms consists of a golden grape, symbolizing the tradition of wine growing, placed on a blue background, which represents the river Svitava flowing through both municipalities.

== Demographics ==
As of the 2021 census, the population is 6,376, up 13% from 5,621 at the 2011 census. The population peaked at 7,537 in 1930.

Historical population

Year	Pop.	±%
1869	1,705	—
1880	2,048	+20.1%
1890	2,761	+34.8%
1900	3,572	+29.4%
1910	4,711	+31.9%

Year	Pop.	±%
1921	5,309	+12.7%
1930	7,537	+42.0%
1950	7,290	−3.3%
1961	7,080	−2.9%
1970	6,446	−9.0%

Year	Pop.	±%
1980	5,747	−10.8%
1991	4,775	−16.9%
2001	4,844	+1.4%
2011	5,621	+16.0%
2021	6,376	+13.4%

Source: Censuses

== Sports ==
There is a multifunctional hall in the city district. The Brno super league team FBŠ Hattrick Brno plays in it and the handball team SHC Maloměřice also operates in it.

One of the two Brno rugby teams, RC Dragon Brno, plays on Cacovický Island.

The football teams SK Obřany and TJ MCV Brno operate in the district.

== Transport ==
The route of the large city ring road passes through the edge of the city district, along which bus line 75 or night bus line 94 goes here. The railway route from Brno to Svitavy passes through the city district. On it, in the central part of the Maloměřice cadastre, there is a complex of the local sorting freight station, which occupies a significant part of the Maloměřice cadastre. Behind the Maloměřice railway station there is also a development that is served by lines 64 and 74.

== Education ==
There is one elementary school on Hamry street and two kindergartens on Cihelní street and Proškova square in the district.

== Notable people ==
- Simona Monyová (1967–2011) - Novelist
