= Statue of Tomáš Garrigue Masaryk (Washington, D.C.) =

Memorial in Washington, D.C., U.S.

Tomáš Garrigue Masaryk Memorial
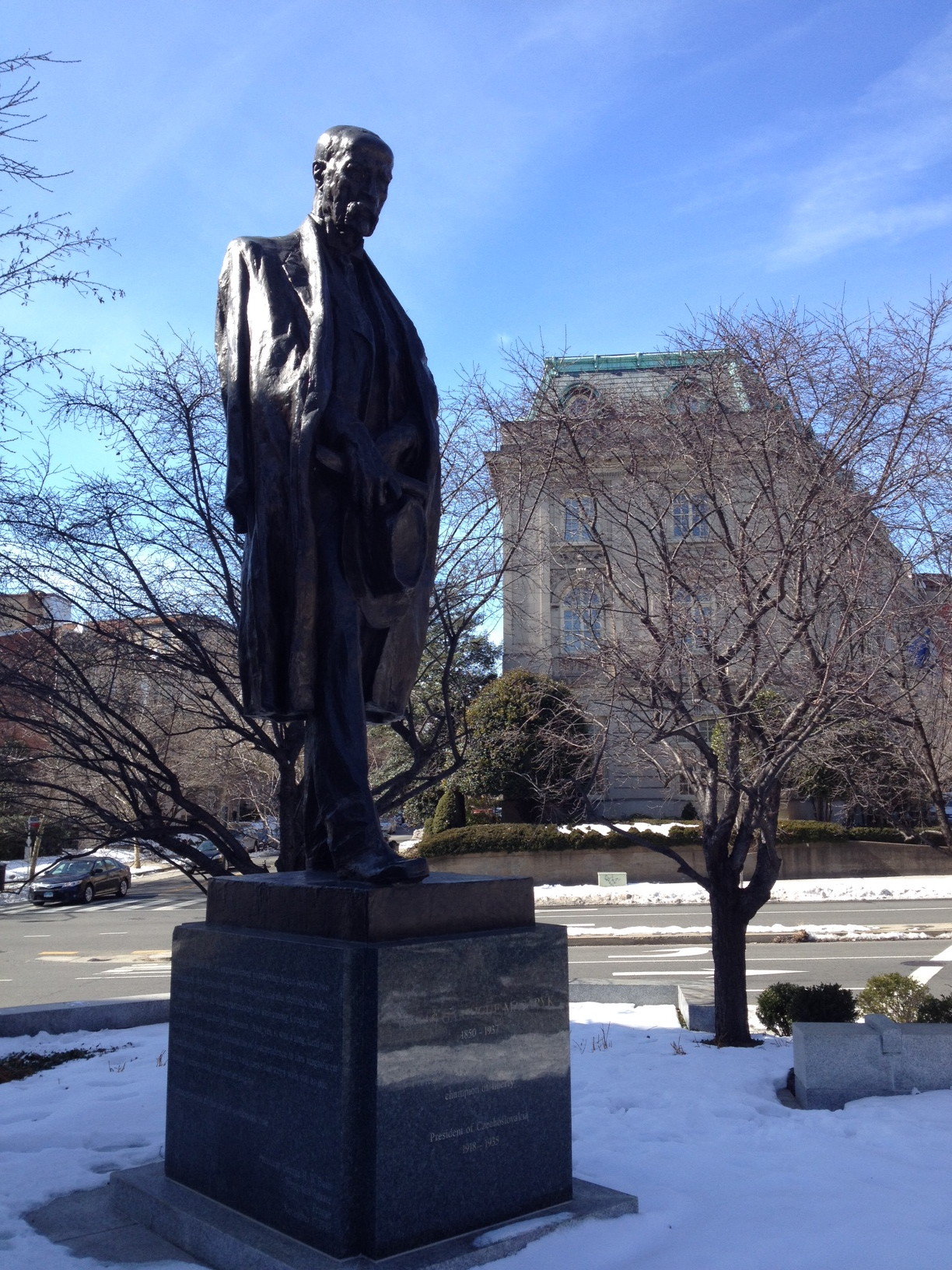
- Artist: Vincenc Makovský
- Year: 1937, cast 1968
- Type: Bronze
- Location: Washington, D.C., United States; 38°54′40.6″N 77°2′54.95″W

The statue of Tomáš Garrigue Masaryk consists of a statue of Tomáš Masaryk, the founding President of Czechoslovakia, sited in a small hardscaped park. The memorial was established by the non-profit American Friends of the Czech Republic, which obtained an Act of Congress to authorize the site, raised the funding, and oversaw the design and construction. The statue was in part a gift from the Czech Republic. The memorial was dedicated on Embassy Row on September 19, 2002, with the participation of Czech President Václav Havel, former Slovak President Michal Kováč, and Prague-born former U.S. Secretary of State Madeleine Albright.

The statue was sculpted from life by Vincenc Makovský, shortly before Masaryk's death in 1937. Long housed in the National Gallery in Prague, it was only cast into bronze in 1968 during the Prague Spring but was not erected at the time.

The park in which the statue stands today, a triangle surrounded by Q Street NW, 22nd Street NW, and Massachusetts Avenue, was designed by landscape architect Roger G. Courtenay of the firm EDAW.

The memorial includes quotes from the Czechoslovak Declaration of independence, drafted under Masaryk's direction in Washington and proclaimed by him on October 18, 1918 on the steps of Independence Hall in Philadelphia; and from a speech delivered by George H. W. Bush in Prague in November 1990. Coincidentally, the memorial is geographically close to the equestrian statue of Philip Sheridan, also on Embassy Row, sculpted by Gutzon Borglum who assisted Masaryk in drafting the Declaration of Czechoslovakia in 1918.

== See also ==
- Statue of Tomáš Garrigue Masaryk, Prague
- List of public art in Washington, D.C., Ward 2
