= František Gellner =

Czech writer, artist, and anarchist (1881–1914)

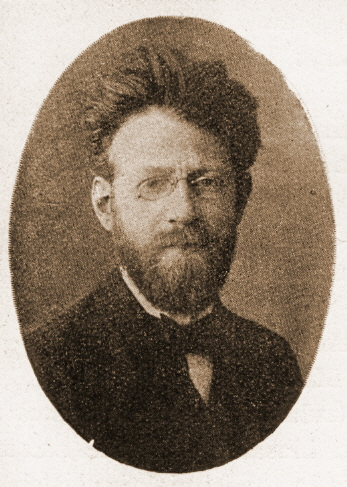
- Gellner around 1900
- Born: 19 June 1881; Prague, Kingdom of Bohemia, Austria-Hungary
- Disappeared: September 1914 (aged 33); Zamość, Kingdom of Galicia and Lodomeria, Austria-Hungary
- Occupations: Poet, Writer, Artist

František Gellner (19 June 1881 – disappeared September 1914) was a Czech poet, short story writer, artist and anarchist.

== Biography ==
František Gellner was born to a poor Jewish family in Mladá Boleslav (Jungbunzlau), Bohemia. His father was a seller and a keen socialist. His student room above his father's shop was the place of his first writing attempts – he covered the walls with his provocative poems and caricatures. He studied at the gymnasium in Mladá Boleslav where he contributed to the student journals Lípa, Lucerna, Pêle-Mêle and Mládí with poems, translations and drawings. He went to Vienna to study at the Polytechnic Institute, but left after two years with just one exam in drawing.

Gellner's Bohemian lifestyle brought him to the anarchist movement. His flat was searched several times by police. He wrote to Nový kult journal. In 1901 he started studying at the Mining Academy in Příbram and often went to Prague to join anarchist parties with S.K. Neumann, Karel Toman, Fráňa Šrámek and Marie Majerová. He started compulsory military service in 1904 but dropped out after a year. He went to Munich to study painting in 1905 and a year later to Paris where he drew caricatures for such journals as Rire, Cri de Paris, and Le temps nouveau. In 1908 he returned to Bohemia (his father was ill) and in 1909 went to Dresden and again to Paris. In 1911 he settled in Brno and started to work for Lidové noviny as a caricaturist and a reporter.

At the beginning of World War I Gellner was recruited to the Austro-Hungarian army and went to Galicia. The last report about him was that he was relaxing on a path between Zamość and Tomaszów. On 13 September 1914 he was reported missing and never found.

== Poetry ==
His first poems are full of irony in Heinrich Heine's style. His poem Patnáct lahví koňaku (Fifteen bottles of cognac) which he wrote at the age of 15 was published in Švanda dudák journal (edited by Ignát Herrmann). In 1901 he published his first collection called Po nás ať přijde potopa! (After Us Let the Floods Come!) in which he used especially sexual motifs without any embellishments. The next collection Radosti života (Joys of Life) shifted the point of view from subject to object and throws the disbelief more on society. The rhythm of the poems is close to vaudeville verses or chansons. Nové verše (New Verses, published posthumously in 1919) are not so pathetic as if seen from a distance with a lot of nonchalance. He also wrote satirical poems in Karel Havlíček Borovský's style which were published mostly in papers and journals. He also illustrated Havlíček's Křest sv. Vladimíra.

One of his best-known poems was published in Po nás ať přijde potopa (1901):

"Perspektiva"

Má milá rozmilá, neplakej!
Život už není jinakej.
Dnes ještě buďme veselí
na naší bílé posteli!
Zejtra, co zejtra? Kdožpak ví.
Zejtra si lehneme do rakví

Translation:

"Prospects"

My little darling, don't you cry!
Don't try the life to modify.
Today let's passionately meet
on our creasy creamy sheet.
Morrow, what's morrow? May one say?
Morrow in coffins we shall lay.

Another piece from the book Básně z pozůstalosti that is typical for Gellner's Bohemian lifestyle begins with this strophe:

"Píseň zhýralého jinocha"

Nezemru já od práce,
nezahynu bídou,
nezalknu se v oprátce,
skončím syfilidou.

Translation:

"The Song of a Libertine"

I won't die of taxing toil,
Won't die of poverty,
Nor will I melt in boiling oil,
I'll die of syphilis.

== See also ==
- List of people who disappeared: 1910-1990
