= Rudolf Těsnohlídek =

Czech writer and poet

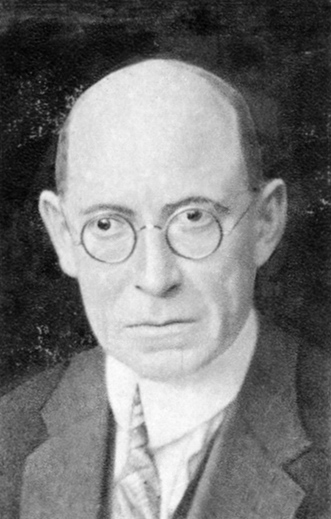
Rudolf Těsnohlídek

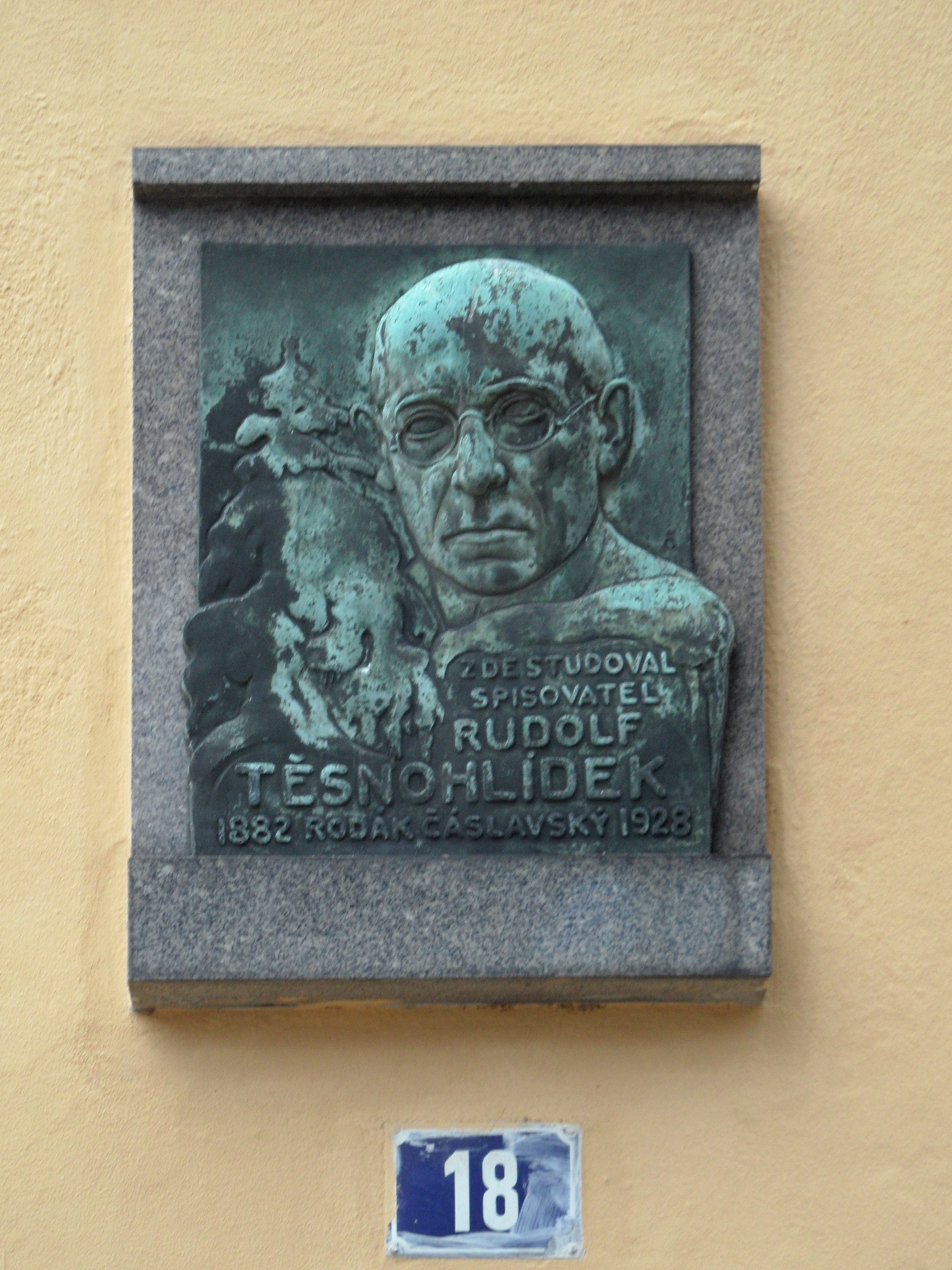
Memorial plaque of Rudolf Těsnohlídek in Čáslav, his birthplace

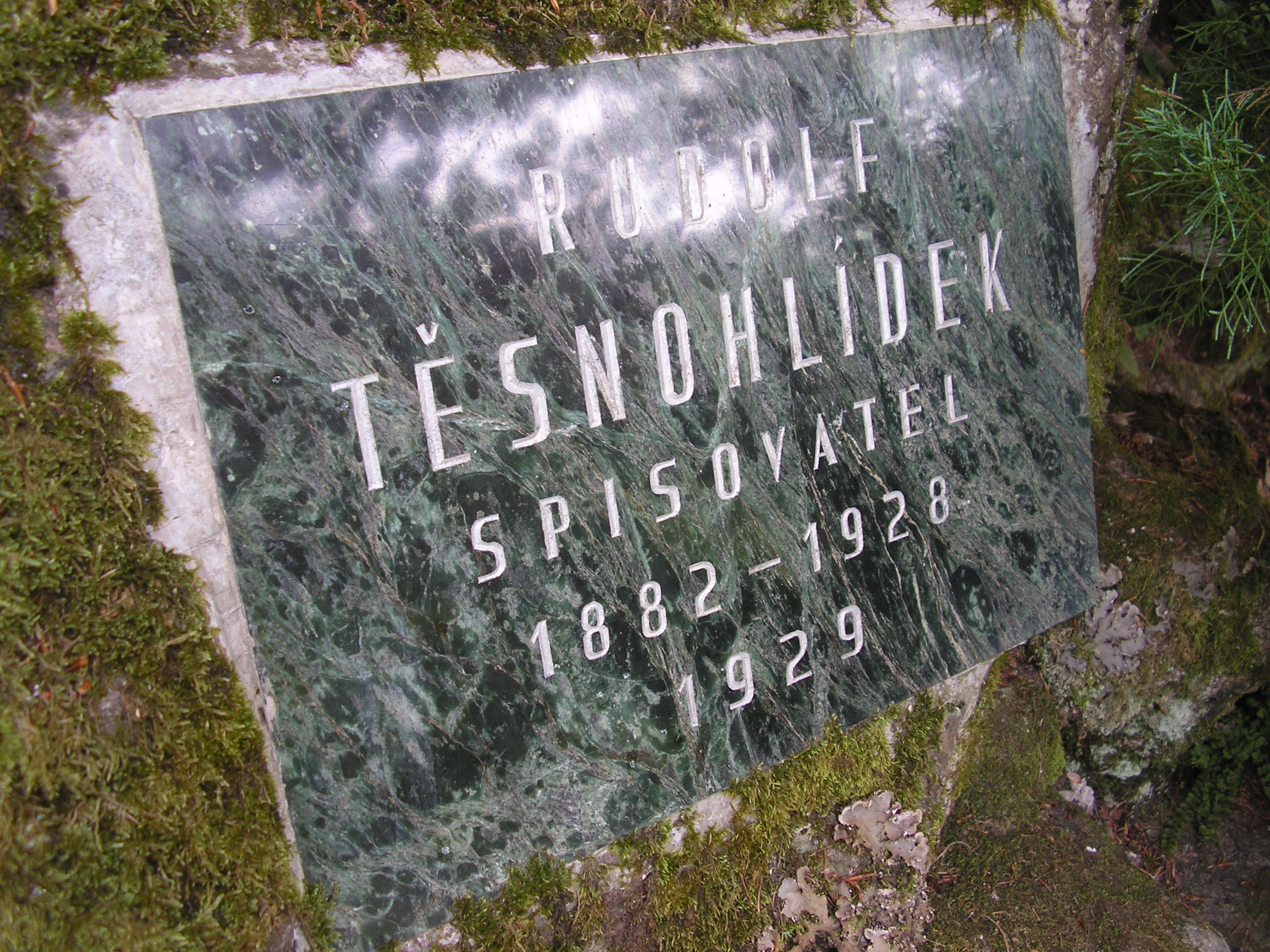
Memorial plaque of Rudolf Těsnohlídek near Brno

Rudolf Těsnohlídek (7 June 1882 – 12 January 1928) was a Czech writer, poet, journalist and translator. He also used the pseudonym Arnošt Bellis.

== Biography ==
Těsnohlídek was born on 7 June 1882 in Čáslav, Austria-Hungary. He attended gymnasium in Hradec Králové and later started to study Czech, history and French at university in Prague but didn't graduate.

Starting in 1908, he was a contributor to the Brno newspaper Lidové noviny, where he became a reporter of soudničky (cases from the local magistrate's court). His serialized novel Liška Bystrouška (Vixen Sharp Ears), written to accompany a series of drawings by Stanislav Lolek, appeared in the Lidové noviny between 7 April and 23 June 1920 and is regarded as an early comic strip. The story was published as a book in 1921, won a state prize and achieved lasting popularity. This optimistic tale, somewhere between a children's fairy tale and adult satire, was used as the basis for Leoš Janáček's opera The Cunning Little Vixen (Příhody Lišky Bystroušky, 1923).

Some of Těsnohlídek's other work reflects more pessimism and alienation than the lighthearted Vixen's tale.

His life, as interpreted by his journalistic colleague Bedřich Golombek, was a melodramatic tragedy imbued with pessimism, darkness, melancholy and decadence, a life plagued from childhood by feelings of sadness and social exclusion. In his teens, he watched helplessly as a friend drowned. When he was 21, he married Jindra Kopecká, a woman with tuberculosis. Two months after their wedding, on a holiday in Norway, she shot herself in the heart in front of him, possibly accidentally. Těsnohlídek was accused of murdering her, and had to endure two trials before being acquitted. In 1907 he moved to Brno.

In November 1909, he married for the second time with Anna Kutilová and they had a son Milan, the only child of Těsnohlídek. He moved to Bílovice nad Svitavou, where his wife came from, and lived there eight years in 1914–1922. In Bílovice nad Svitavou he wrote Liška Bystrouška and considered the period spent there to be the happiest and most fruitful in his life.

Two day before Christmas 1919, Těsnohlídek and some friends were walking in the woods outside Bílovice nad Svitavou when they discovered an abandoned girl, aged seventeen months, in danger of freezing. They rescued the child and took her to the police station.

He married a third time. He became interested in exploring the Moravian caves, wrote extensively about them, and submitted his drafts for publication but found they had been heavily edited without his knowledge. On 12 January 1928 in Brno, he shot himself, as his first wife had done. His third wife gassed herself to death on hearing the news.

== Adaptations ==
Ursula Dubosarsky's 2018 novel for children, Brindabella, is based on Vixen Sharp Ears relocated in the Australian bush, with the role of the Vixen played by a kangaroo.

== Work ==
- Nénie (1902) – poetry
- Dva mezi ostatními (Two Among Others) (1906)
- Květy v jíní (Flowers in Hoarfrost) (1908)
- Poseidon (1916)
- Liška Bystrouška (Vixen Sharp-ears, The Cunning Little Vixen) (1920)
- Kolonia Kutejsík (1922, awarded a state prize)
- Paví oko (Peacock's Eye) (1922)
- Čimčirínek a chlapci (Čimčirínek and the Boys) (1922, stories for children)
- Den (Day) (1923)
- Vrba zelená (Green Willow) (1925)
- Cvrček na cestách (Cricket on the move) (1927)
- Surovost z něžnosti a jiné soudničky (The Brutality of Tenderness and Other soudničky) (a collection of his soudničky, published in 1982)

Vixen Sharp Ears was first published in English in 1985, as The Cunning Little Vixen, with pictures by Maurice Sendak.
