= Bílovice nad Svitavou =

- Municipality
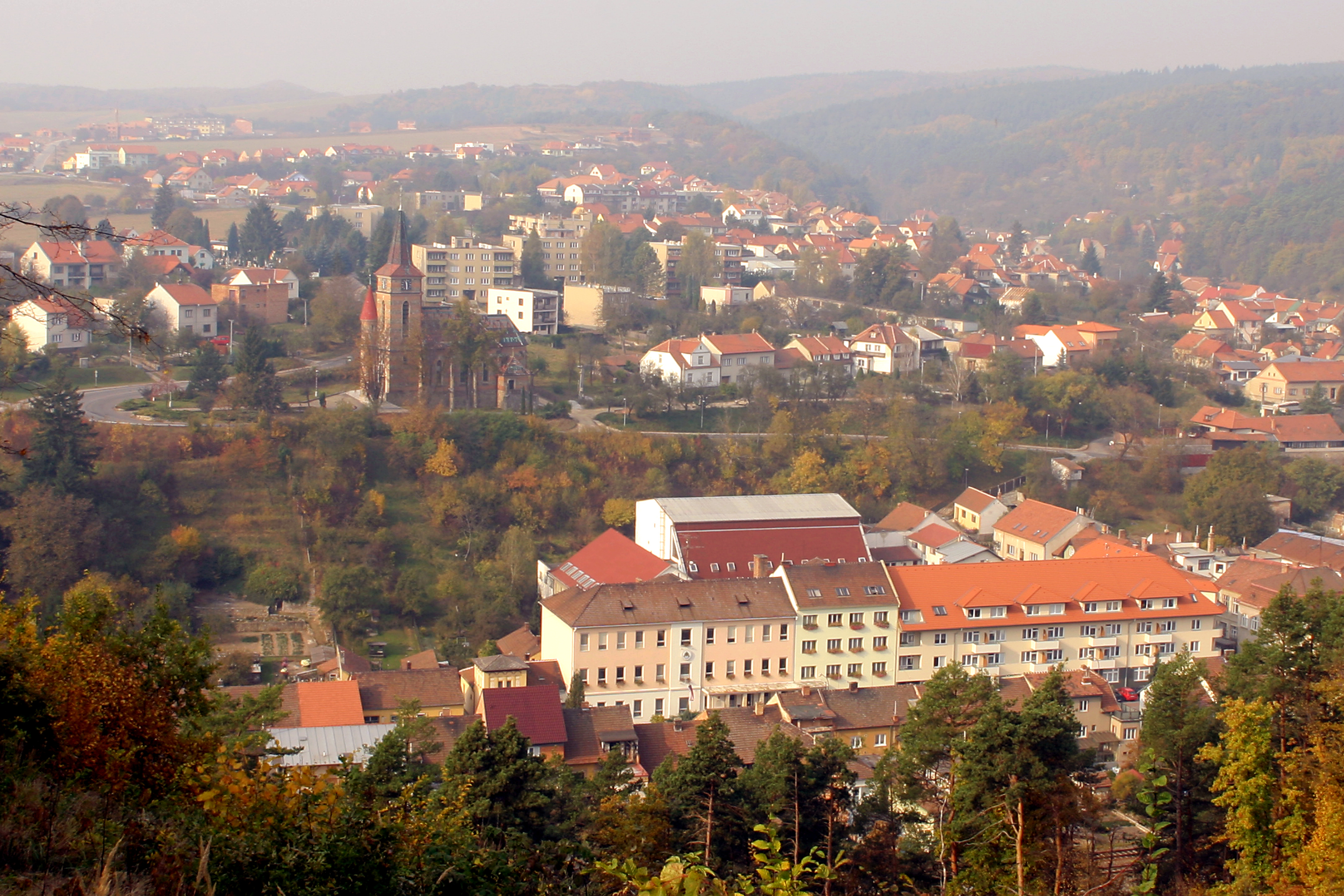
- General view of Bílovice

- Flag Coat of arms

- Location in the Czech Republic
- Coordinates: 49°14′50″N 16°40′21″E
- Country: Czech Republic
- Region: South Moravian
- District: Brno-Country
- First mentioned: 1419

Area
  - Total: 14.70 km^{2} (5.68 sq mi)
- Elevation: 236 m (774 ft)

Population (2026-01-01)
  - Total: 3,690
  - Density: 251/km^{2} (650/sq mi)
- Time zone: UTC+1 (CET)
  - Summer (DST): UTC+2 (CEST)
- Postal code: 664 01
- Website: www.bilovicens.cz

Bílovice nad Svitavou (Czech pronunciation: [ˈbiːlovɪtsɛ ˈnat svɪtavou]) is a municipality and village in Brno-Country District in the South Moravian Region of the Czech Republic. It has about 3,700 inhabitants.

== Geography ==
Bílovice nad Svitavou is located about 4 kilometres (2 mi) north of Brno. It lies in the Drahany Highlands. The highest point is at 473 m (1,552 ft) above sea level. The Svitava River flows through the municipality. Most of the municipal territory is forested.

== History ==
The first written mention of Bílovice nad Svitavou is from 1419.

== Demographics ==
Historical population

Year	Pop.	±%
1869	780	—
1880	832	+6.7%
1890	919	+10.5%
1900	1,078	+17.3%
1910	1,414	+31.2%

Year	Pop.	±%
1921	1,846	+30.6%
1930	2,214	+19.9%
1950	2,545	+15.0%
1961	2,455	−3.5%
1970	2,219	−9.6%

Year	Pop.	±%
1980	2,253	+1.5%
1991	2,043	−9.3%
2001	2,302	+12.7%
2011	3,674	+59.6%
2021	3,868	+5.3%

Source: Censuses

== Transport ==
Bílovice nad Svitavou is located on the railway line Brno–Letovice.

== Sights ==
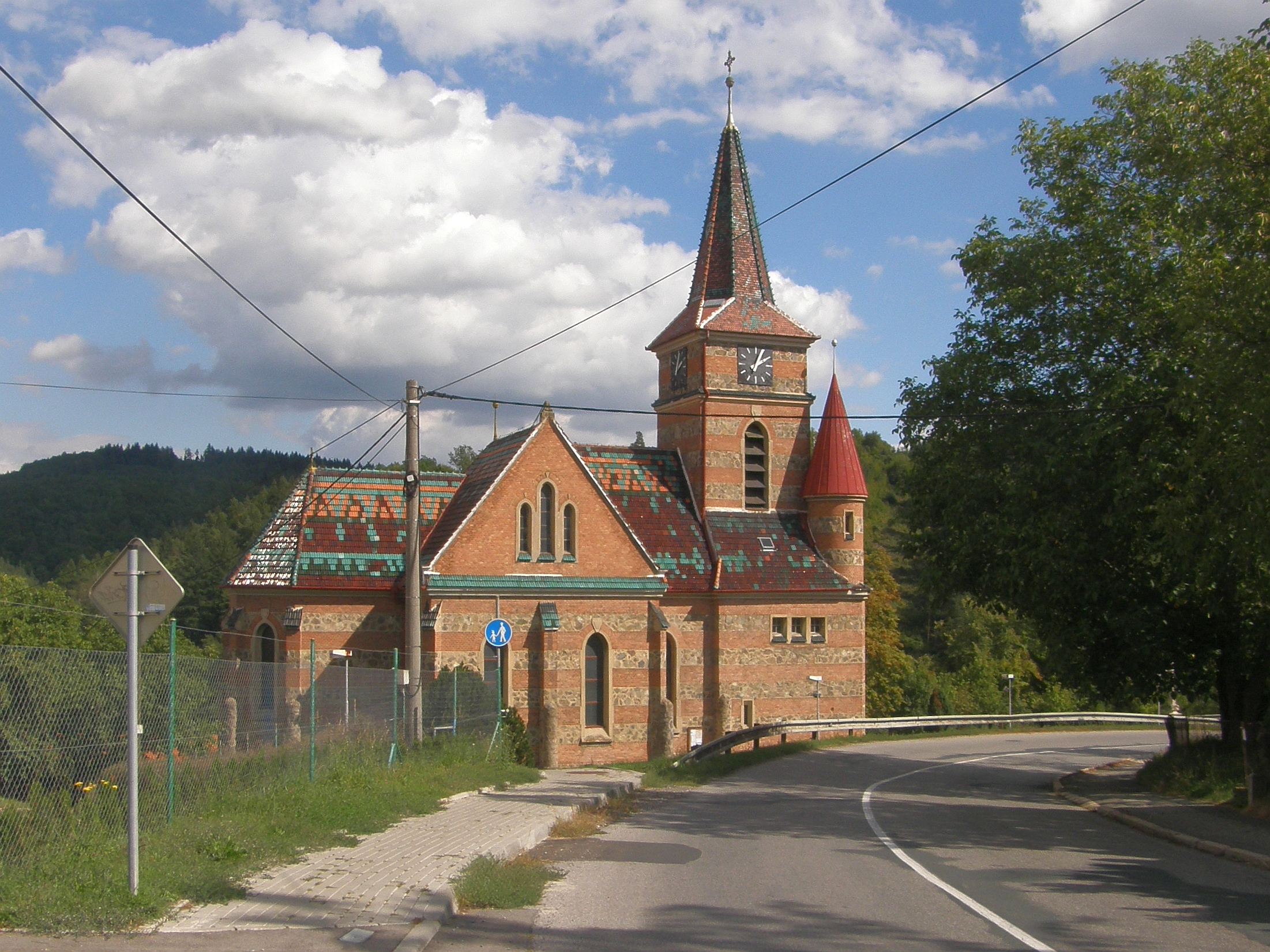
Church of Saints Cyril and Methodius

The main landmark is the Church of Saints Cyril and Methodius. It was built in the noo-Gothic style with Art Nouveau elements in 1908–1913. In the interior there is a rare statue of St. Wenceslaus from the second half of the 17th century.

At the instigation of the writer Rudolf Těsnohlídek, a monument to those killed in World War I was created in Bílovice nad Svitavou in 1915. This is the first monument of this kind in Europe.

The house where the writer Stanislav Kostka Neumann lived until 1915 is a valuable rural Art Nouveau house, protected as a cultural monument. In 1964, a monument to Stanislav Kostka Neumann, created by Vincenc Makovský, was unveiled in the municipality.

Ronov Castle used to be in the woods in the northern part of the territory. It was founded in the second half of the 14th century. Only the remains of the foundations and the system of ramparts and ditches have survived to this day, but the locality is still a tourist destination.

== Notable people ==
- Stanislav Kostka Neumann (1875–1947), poet; lived here in 1907–1915
- Rudolf Těsnohlídek (1882–1928), writer; lived here in 1914–1922
