= Kanice (Brno-Country District) =

- Municipality
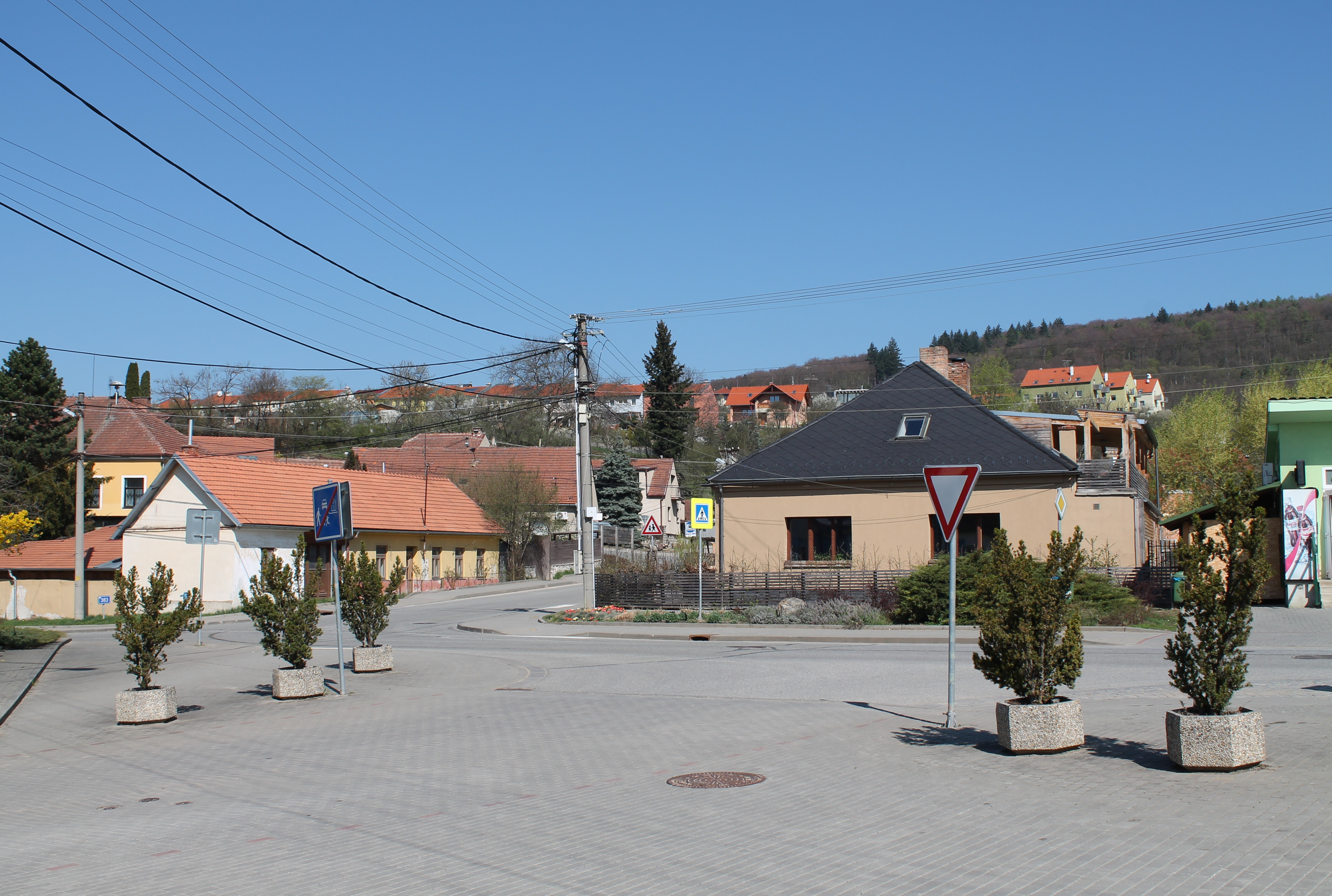
- Centre of Kanice

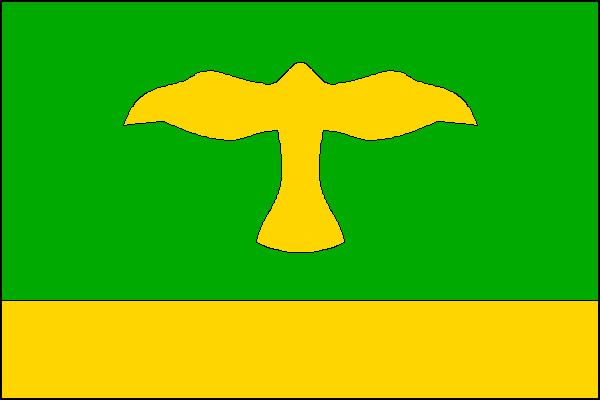
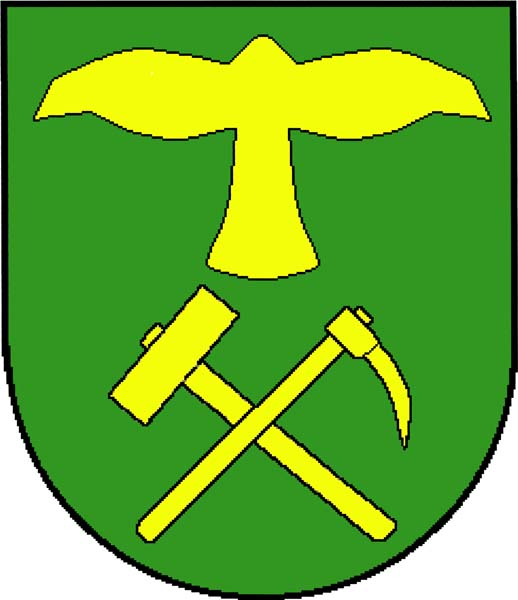
- Flag Coat of arms

- Location in the Czech Republic
- Coordinates: 49°15′49″N 16°42′52″E
- Country: Czech Republic
- Region: South Moravian
- District: Brno-Country
- First mentioned: 1365

Area
  - Total: 8.21 km^{2} (3.17 sq mi)
- Elevation: 316 m (1,037 ft)

Population (2026-01-01)
  - Total: 1,116
  - Density: 136/km^{2} (352/sq mi)
- Time zone: UTC+1 (CET)
  - Summer (DST): UTC+2 (CEST)
- Postal code: 664 01
- Website: obeckanice.eu

Kanice is a municipality and village in Brno-Country District in the South Moravian Region of the Czech Republic. It has about 1,100 inhabitants.

Kanice lies approximately 9 kilometres (6 mi) north-east of Brno and 189 km (117 mi) south-east of Prague.

== Demographics ==
Historical population
Year	Pop.	±%
1869	354	—
1880	374	+5.6%
1890	453	+21.1%
1900	422	−6.8%
1910	471	+11.6%
1921	437	−7.2%
1930	567	+29.7%
1950	493	−13.1%
1961	541	+9.7%
1970	507	−6.3%
1980	516	+1.8%
1991	446	−13.6%
2001	486	+9.0%
2011	811	+66.9%
2021	1,099	+35.5%
Source: Censuses

== Twin towns – sister cities ==
Kanice is twinned with:

- Spillern, Austria
