= Židenice =

- Cadastral territory of Brno
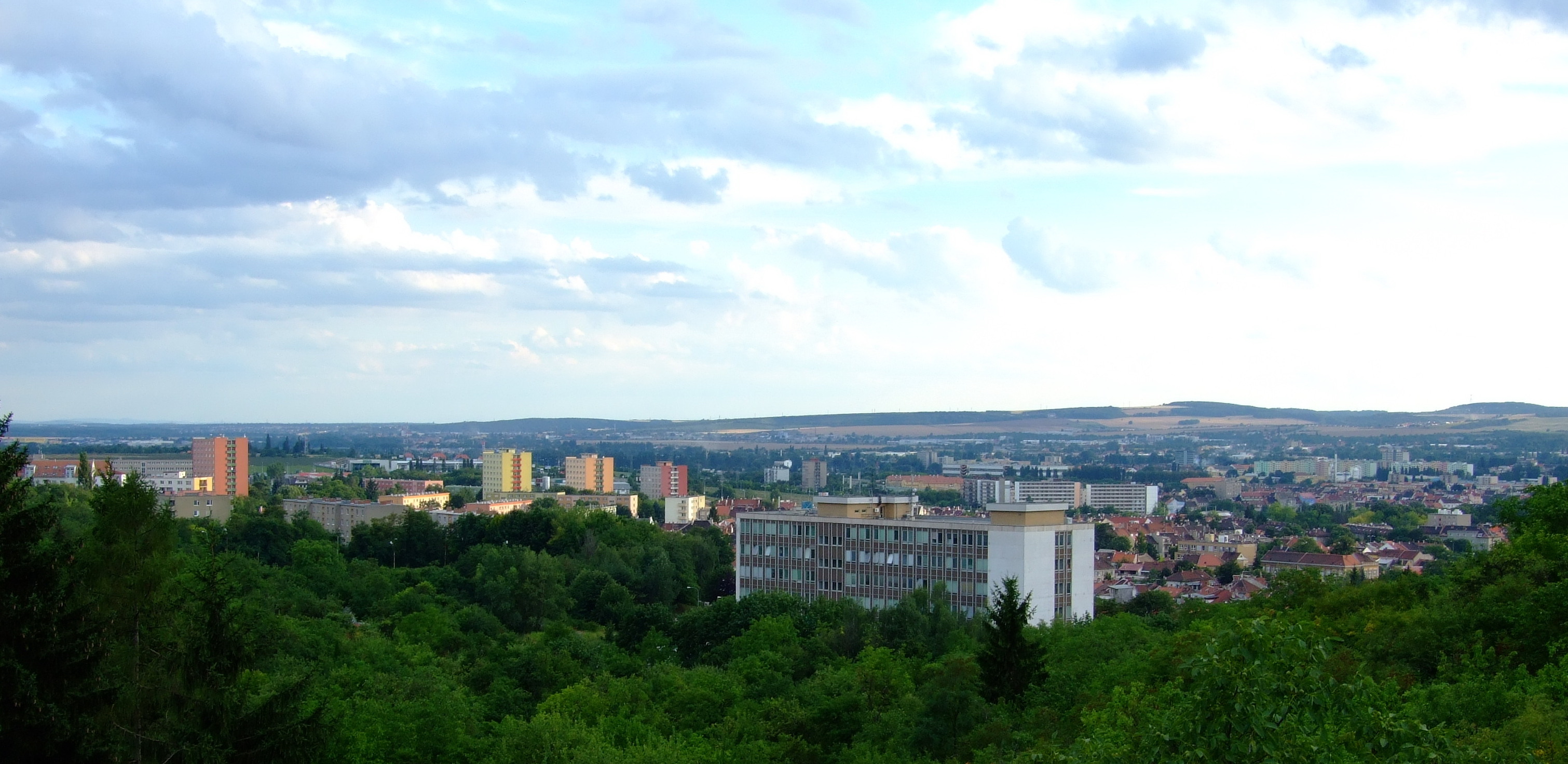
- View of Židenice from Brno-Vinohrady

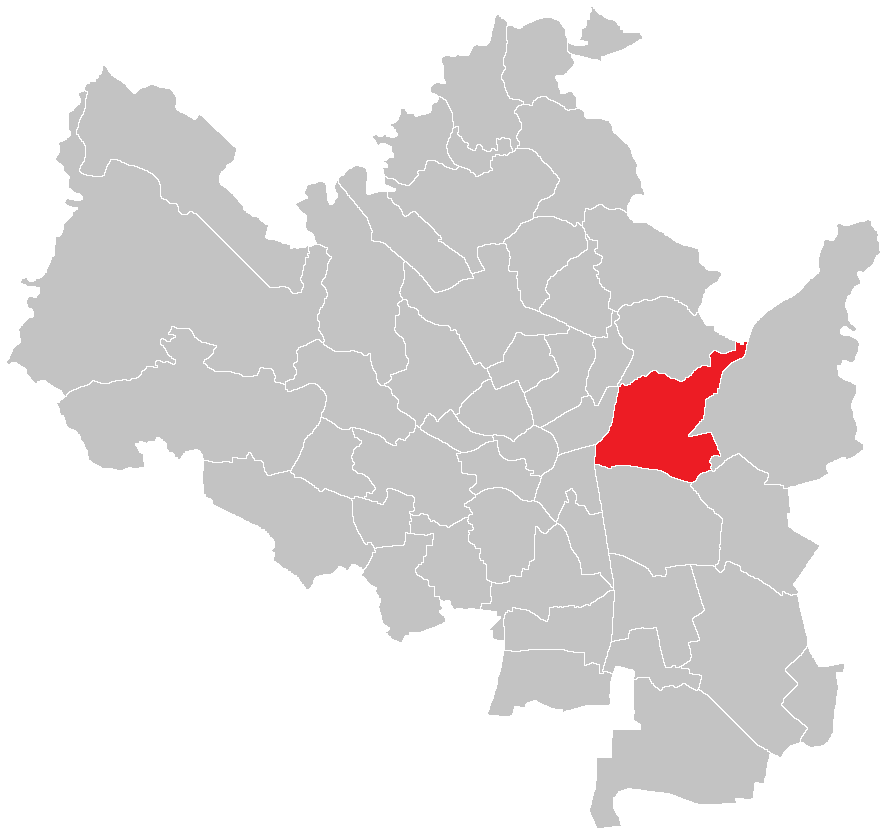
- Location of Židenice in Brno 49°12′8″N 16°38′35″E
- Country: Czech Republic
- Region: South Moravian Region
- City: Brno
- City district: Brno-Židenice, Brno-Vinohrady

Area
  - Total: 6.47 km^{2} (2.50 sq mi)

Population (2021)
  - Total: 33,072
  - Density: 5,110/km^{2} (13,200/sq mi)
- Time zone: UTC+1 (CET)
  - Summer (DST): UTC+2 (CEST)
- Postal code: 615 00, 628 00, 636 00

Židenice (German: Schimitz, Hantec: Šimice) is a municipal part and cadastral territory in Brno, Czech Republic, almost entirely located on the left bank of the river Svitava. It has an area of 6.47 km^{2}. Originally an independent municipality, it was annexed to Brno in 1919, and since November 24, 1990, it makes up most of the city district of Brno-Židenice, as well as the entirety of Brno-Vinohrady on the eastern side. About 33,000 people live here, making Židenice the most populated cadastral territory in Brno.

== Etymology ==
The name of the village (Židenici in its oldest form) was derived from the personal name Židen (less likely Židna), which was a domestic form of some personal name beginning with Ž(i)d-, for example Židebor, Židemir, Ždimir (in the base of which is ž(i )dati - "expect"). The meaning of the name was "Židen's people". The German name developed by shortening from the Czech name.

== History ==
Most of the current border of the cadastral territory of Židenice was determined during the cadastral reform of Brno in the second half of the 1960s. At the end of the 1970s, the current border with Líšeň was established, whereby Židenice lost all land in modern Líšeň. This boundary change was necessitated by the construction of the Nový Líšeň panel housing estate, as some of the panel houses encroached on the Židenice cadastral territory. The entire cadastral territory of Židenice remained part of the Brno IV municipal district until 1990. In the 1970s, the entire village core of Židenice was demolished. In the first half of the 1980s, the construction of the last panel housing estate in Brno, Vinohrady, began in the northeastern part of the Židenice cadastral territory, during which the entire colony of "Hamburg" was demolished. After the Velvet Revolution, since November 24, 1990, the cadastral territory of Židenice has been divided between the modern city districts of Brno-Židenice and Brno-Vinohrady. On March 28, 2015, panel houses in the northwest of the Brno-Vinohrady district, which previously belonged to the Maloměřice cadastral territory, were moved to the cadastral territory of Židenice.

== Description ==
Židenice covers an urbanistically disparate and landscape-varied territory, in the center of which is the Židenice hill (307 m above sea level). The western part is covered by the flat floodplain of the river Svitava at a height of around 200 m, in the southeast rises Bílá hora (300 m), while in the northeastern tip the terrain rises above 390 m, at the slope of Hády. The southwestern half of the territory is filled by the continuous urban development of the Židenice and Juliánov districts in Brno-Židenice, from which the Vinohrady panel housing estate on the plateau in the northeastern part of the Židenice hill is separated by a belt of gardens, plains and forest parks (Akátky, Bílá hora). The cadastre continues to the northeast through a narrowing edge of the plains, where first there is the ruderal zone of the former tailings pond and behind it the forest-steppe area of the southern slopes of Hády, also part of Velká Klajdovka. At the very end of this tip there is a lookout point, an inn and the Velká Klajdovka farm (generally considered by the public to be part of the adjacent Lišné).

The fact that Židenice is in two different city districts (Brno-Židenice and Brno-Vinohrady) is unique in Brno – in other cases, either the city districts correspond to their own cadastral territories, or they themselves are composed of several cadastral territories.

== Geography ==
In the west, the territory is defined by the river Svitava, while it also includes the western bank. In the northwest by the railway line approximately No. 260. In the north, the border runs through the gardening settlement under Akátky, then along the northern edge of the Vinohrady housing estate and through an intersection directly to Pod Hády street. It follows this for a short time and then continues through the countryside along an indistinct route to Hády Street below Kavky. It follows it for almost 600 meters before turning directly north through the territory of Velká Klajdovka, onto the upper road leading through the former Hády quarry, and roughly along it leads to road II/373. The eastern border is along this road, i.e. Jedovnické street, then along Křtinská street, Líšeňská street, and along the western edge of the Zetor industrial complex. The southern border is then roughly along Vlárské dráhy and then along Olomoucká street to Svitava.

Židenice is adjacent to other Brno cadastral territories Trnitá, Zábrdovice, Husovice, Maloměřice, Líšeň, Slatina, Černovice and briefly borders the territory of the municipality of Kanice.

== Territorial divisions ==
The cadastral territory of Židenice is further divided into 15 basic settlement units.

Basic settlement unit	Population		
Basic settlement unit	2011	2021	Change
Životského	567	508	-10.4%
Klíny	2,350	2,570	+9.4%
Rokycanova	2,777	3,123	+12.5%
Vančurova	230	234	+1.7%
Nopova	1,564	1,533	-2.0%
Vinohrady (Note: The 2011 population here includes the part of Brno-Vinohrady that was part of the cadastral territory of Maloměřice before 2015.)	13,361	12,166	-8.9%
Balbínova	1,506	1,487	-1.3%
Akáty	48	55	+14.6%
Podsednická	69	75	+8.7%
Stará osada	1,784	1,753	-1.7%
Markéty Kuncové	1,230	1,111	-9.7%
Skorkovského	2,798	2,787	-0.4%
Sídliště Juliánov	2,994	2,832	-5.4%
Bílá hora	2,455	2,833	+15.4%
Vinice	-	5	-

== Demographics ==
Historical population

Year	Pop.	±%
1869	3,067	—
1880	3,473	+13.2%
1890	6,367	+83.3%
1900	11,326	+77.9%
1910	17,904	+58.1%

Year	Pop.	±%
1921	17,870	−0.2%
1930	27,680	+54.9%
1950	27,206	−1.7%
1961	29,180	+7.3%
1970	29,245	+0.2%

Year	Pop.	±%
1980	25,035	−14.4%
1991	35,461	+41.6%
2001	33,717	−4.9%
2011	33,733	+0.0%
2021	33,072	−2.0%

The population stagnating between 1961-1970 is due to border changes in 1969.
Source: Censuses

== Monuments ==
- Church of St. Cyril and Methodius
- Temple of the Savior (Chrám spasitele)
- Evangelic church
- Jewish cemetery
- Monument to the workers' movement (památník dělnického hnutí)
- Chapel of St. Francis of Assisi
