= Brno-Líšeň =

- City District of Brno
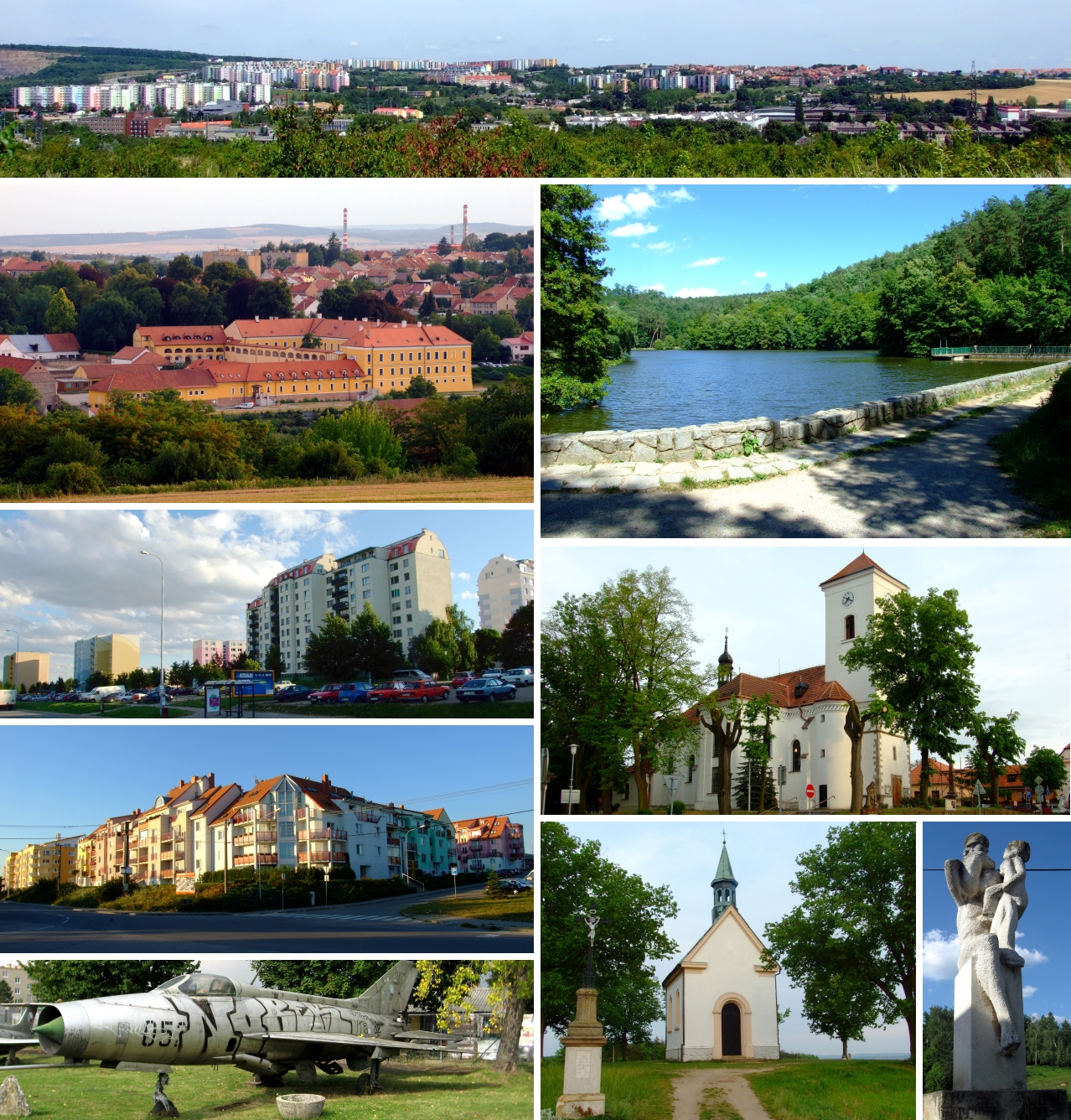

- Flag Coat of arms

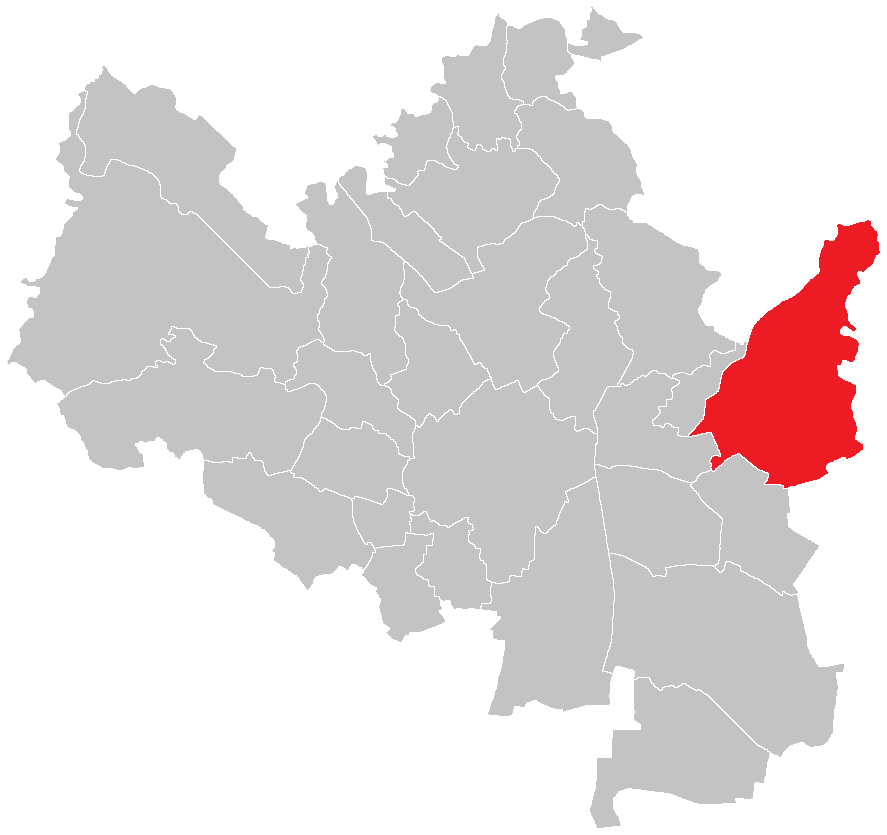
- Location of Brno-Líšeň in Brno 49°12′27″N 16°41′10″E
- Country: Czech Republic
- Region: South Moravian Region
- City: Brno

Government
  - Mayor: Břetislav Štefan (ČSSD)

Area
  - Total: 15.71 km^{2} (6.07 sq mi)

Population (2023)
  - Total: 27,234
  - Density: 1,734/km^{2} (4,490/sq mi)
- Time zone: UTC+1 (CET)
  - Summer (DST): UTC+2 (CEST)
- Postal code: 628 00
- Website: https://www.brno-lisen.cz/

Brno-Líšeň is a city district of Brno, Czech Republic, in the northeastern part of the city. It consists of the cadastral territory of Líšeň (German: Lösch), originally a town that was annexed to Brno in 1944. The cadastral territory has an area of 15.71 km^{2}. The city district was established on November 24, 1990. Over 26,000 people live here.

The district can be divided into "Old Líšeň" (original development of a village or small-town character) and "New Líšeň" (a panel housing estate built in the 1980s on the slopes west of the older development). The heart of the old Líšeň is the Charles IV square, locally called "Městečko" (lit: 'little town'). The district office is located in a service complex on a housing estate near the Jírova transport hub.

For the purposes of the senate elections, Brno-Líšeň is included in electoral district number 58 of the Brno-City District.

== Etymology ==
The original name of the settlement was Léščen, identical to the general léščen(ý) - "hazel" and denoted a settlement (or a castle) in a hazel forest. This adjective was used in the nominal declension: Léščna, Léščnu, Léščnem. According to the local name Léščné, the ending of the first case changed to -ň (Léščeň). The form Líšeň is the result of the regular vowel change é > í and the simplification of the vowel group šč. The German name Lösch (in the older form Lesch) originated from Czech.

== History ==
The area of Líšeň was already inhabited in prehistoric times. At the location of Staré Zámky, located on the Říčka promontory northeast of the present-day Líšeň, settlement by Slavic tribes, which lasted until the 12th century, was documented by archaeological findings. Subsequently, the housing estate was moved to the current location.

Líšeň is first mentioned in sources in 1261, when it was donated by Smil from Střílky to the Cistercian monastery in Vizovice. However, it is a forgery from the mid-14th century. The first reliable document is from 1306, when the local branch church of St. Aegidius. After the demise of the Vizovice monastery at the end of the 15th century, it fell into secular possession, and in 1520 a separate Lišeň manor was established. In 1558, it was promoted to a small town and received a seal and coat of arms. Among the frequently changing owners of the Lišeň estate were the gentlemen from Bořitová from Budeč, the Pergers from Perg, the Libštejns from Kolovratové and others. In 1714, Jan Kryštof of Freyenfels bought the estate from the Libštejn family, who had a new baroque castle built. After the Freyenfels died out, the estate was inherited by the Belcredis, who held it until the abolition of the patrimonial administration in 1848.

In 1862, Count Egbert Belcredi founded the monastery of the Sisters of Mercy of St. Karel Borromeo with the chapel of St. Josef, where an orphanage and a school were opened in 1863, originally mixed (girls and boys), later only girls.

In the 19th century, the development of the predominantly agricultural Lišňa was hindered by insufficient communication links with Brno. Only in 1905 was the local railway Brno–Líšeň established. At the beginning of the 20th century, a great construction boom of the town began, which culminated during the First Republic. In the 1920s, the town was electrified, in 1934 sewers were installed in the main streets, and new public buildings were built. During World War II, forced administration was imposed on the Belcredi estate in Lišeň. At the end of the war, Líšen suffered greatly from Allied bombing.

=== Annexation into Brno ===
The modern district of Brno-Líšeň includes, in addition to the large majority of the original cadastre of the former township of Líšeň, also some peripheral parts of the original cadastres of Židenice and Horákov.

Líšeň was annexed to Brno (within its original boundaries) on January 1, 1944, but the originally Židenice parts of the modern Líšeň cadastre, including the peripheral western part of today's New Líšeň housing estate, were already annexed to Brno on April 16, 1919. After the Second World War, the revolutionary MNV (Local committee) Líšeň was established here, which until 1946 managed the entire cadastral territory of Líšeň at the time. At that time, the Židenice area of today's district were managed by the revolutionary MNV Židenice. Even in the years 1947–1949, the entire cadastral territory of Líšeň was administered as one urban district of Brno – Brno X, while at that time the Židenice areas continued to be administered by the district council in Židenice. From October 1, 1949, to 1971, the present-day territory of the Brno-Líšeň district was always part of two Brno city districts: one with its headquarters in Židenice, or later elsewhere (successively, city districts Brno IX, Brno VI, Brno VI-Židenice and Brno IV .), managed the Židenice lands and the Lišeň area of Malá Klajdovka at the time; while the second, based in Líšeň (gradually Brno XII, Brno XII-Líšeň or simply Líšeň), managed the rest of the territory of the modern Brno-Líšeň district and then also the Líšeň lands extending to the north side of the road in today's Hviezdoslavova street in the territory of the modern district Brno-Slatina. On the contrary, at that time the Lišeň areas from this road to the south were from 1949 also part of the non-Lišeň district national committees: first, until 1954, part of the Brno X district (not to be confused with the Brno X district from 1947 to 1949) and then part of the city districts or parts based in Slatina (successively Brno XI, Brno XI-Slatina and Slatina)

During the radical adjustment of the cadastral division of Brno as part of the reambulation, carried out in the late 1960s of the 20th century, Líšen acquired the current southern and southwestern borders, and in the vicinity of the Bílá Hora hill and Malá Klajdovka, also part of the current western border. At that time, the smaller southern part of the original Líšen cadastre was attached to Slatina, the gardens on the northeastern slope of Bílá hora were then attached to Židenice, on the other hand, some peripheral parts of the Židenice cadastre were attached to Líšeň - a small area west of Stránská skála, or land adjacent to the northern slope of Stránská skála. However, there was also an inconspicuous adjustment of the border along the old road from Ochoz u Brna. Around the same time, the cadastral border with Horákov and Podolí was adjusted. Another change in the border of Líšeň, within Brno, followed in 1979, when Líšeň acquired its current borders - at that time some houses of the newly built panel housing estate New Líšeň crossed over to the then Židenice cadastre, and for practical reasons it was therefore decided to move the western border of Líšeň, at the expense of Židenice, so that the new border copied the western edge of the new road in Jedovnická street. On November 26, 1971, the Líšeň district was named Brno XII.Líšeň (changed to Brno-Líšeň from May 1, 1972) and at the same time the borders of the territory under the administration of the local MNV were brought into line with the cadastral borders of Líšeň from the late 1960s. On December 1, 1975, the Local National Committee was abolished in Líšeň, and the entire cadastre of Líšeň was then part of the then Brno IV municipal district until 1990. The current city district of Brno-Líšeň was established on November 24, 1990.

== Geography ==
In the northwest, Brno-Líšeň is adjacent to the municipality of Kanice, to the west, to the Brno-Vinohrady and Brno-Židenice districts; in the south with the city district of Brno-Slatina; in the southeast with the village of Podolí; in the east with the municipality of Mokrá-Horákov; and in the north with the village of Ochoz u Brna.

The northern part of the Lišné cadastre is covered with forests and the southern edge of the Moravian Karst protected area extends here. On the eastern border of the cadastre is the picturesque and deeply incised Mariánské valley, which is used for cultural purposes and for recreation and relaxation not only by local residents, but by all Brno residents. The valley is also easily passable by bicycle, strollers and other vehicles (motor vehicles require a special permit). The Říčka stream flows through the valley, on which there are three ponds or valley reservoirs built in 1961–1967, several mills and excursion restaurants. Part of the valley is also occupied by a cottage area.

Under socialism, Mariánské valley was renamed Gottwald's valley, and in the area built for that purpose, "peace celebrations" were held every year at the end of June, attended by local and national communist officials (for example, Gustáv Husák), popular singers (for example, Miroslav Žbirka) and there used to be various fairground attractions.

== Territorial divisions ==
The cadastral territory of Líšeň is further divided into 15 basic settlement units.

Basic settlement unit	Population		
Basic settlement unit	2011	2021	Change
Trnkova	2,557	2,358	-7.8%
Líšeň-jih	6,055	5,665	-6.4%
Líšeň-cihelna	104	87	-16.4%
Pod Stránskou skálou	643	403	-37.3%
Kubelíkova	1,966	1,864	-5.2%
Líšeň-sever	10,425	10,556	+1.3%
Kostelíček	142	155	+9.2%
Líšeň-zámek	1,057	944	-10.7%
Holzova	1,182	1,353	+14.5%
Mariánské údolí	583	678	+16.3%
Staré Zámky	43	83	+93.0%
Velká Klajdovka	0	1	-
Anaklety	4	7	+75.0%
Chochola	0	0	+0%
Líšeň-východ	2,020	2,112	+4.6%

== Demographics ==
As of the 2021 census, the population is 26,266, down 2% from 26,781 at the 2011 census, which was also the peak population.

Historical population

Year	Pop.	±%
1869	3,590	—
1880	3,938	+9.7%
1890	4,396	+11.6%
1900	4,559	+3.7%
1910	5,280	+15.8%

Year	Pop.	±%
1921	5,555	+5.2%
1930	6,596	+18.7%
1950	7,456	+13.0%
1961	7,649	+2.6%
1970	6,919	−9.5%

Year	Pop.	±%
1980	6,266	−9.4%
1991	26,476	+322.5%
2001	25,388	−4.1%
2011	26,781	+5.5%
2021	26,266	−1.9%

Source: Censuses

== Industry ==
The most important company in Lišeň is Zetor, which produces tractors. A number of other companies are also located in the extensive Zetor campus.

== Education ==
There are 7 elementary schools in Líšeň on Horníkova, Holzova, Pohankova streets (detached workplace of the school on Holzová street), Masarova, Novolíšeňská and private Křesťanská Elementary School and Jan Hus Kindergarten also on Masarová street and Akademia elementary school on Rašelinová street. There are three secondary schools here: Akademia Gymnasium on Rašelinové street, Secondary School and SOU Engineering and Electrical Engineering on Trnkova street and an Evangelical Academy on Šimáčková street. Trnkova street is also home to Antonín Doležal Elementary Art School.

== Transport ==
Lišeň is connected to the rest of the city by two four-lane roads; road II/373 Brno – Ochoz u Brna runs along its northern edge. In the south, it is connected to the Olomouc radial highway.

From 1905, a local railway from Černovice led to Líšeň. In 1942, due to the connection with Brno, it was taken over by the Brno Public Transport Companies, the line was electrified and double-tracked, but in 1964 it was shortened only to Stránská skála and the section to Líšeň was abandoned. Today there is a public transport museum in the area of the former railway station.

Public transport in Líšeň consists of three to four day (55, 58, 78 and intercity 151) and three night (N97, N98, N99) bus lines, two trolleybus lines (25, 26) and one or by two tram lines (8, 10). Line number 8 is one of the most important and busiest tram lines in Brno, in Líšeň it runs through the Líšeň ravine and forms the axis of the New Líšeň. The underground stop Jírova in Líšeň is the highest tram station in Brno. In the years 1998–2004, there was a headland terminus here, which after the completion of the Jírova - Mifkova section (also a headland terminus, one of two in Brno) was moved to the border of the Old Líšeň. The area of Líšeň is also somewhat served by tram line 10, which stops at the terminal Stránská skála on the southern edge of the industrial area, or on weekdays, there are a few services to the Novolíšeňská loop at the western end of the housing estate.

The plan is to restore the line from Stránská skála to the transport museum in Líšeň.

== Notable people ==
- Martin Kříž (1841–1916) – amateur karst researcher, archaeologist and writer
- Ludwig Blum (1891–1974) - Moravian-born Israeli painter
- Jindřich Breitcetl (1913–1943) – navigator, pilot and commander of the 311th Czechoslovak Bomber Squadron RAF
- Richard Mořic Belcredi (1926–2015) – employee of Radio Free Europe and ambassador of the Czech Republic in Switzerland
