= Ludwig Blum =

Israeli painter

- לודויג בלום
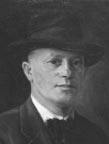
- Ludwig Blum
- Born: 24 July 1891; Brno-Líšeň, Margraviate of Moravia
- Died: 28 July 1974 (aged 83); Jerusalem, Israel
- Resting place: Har HaMenuchot
- Occupation: Painter

Ludwig Blum (Hebrew: לודויג בלום; 24 July 1891 – 28 July 1974) was a Moravian-born Israeli painter. He emigrated to Israel in 1923, as part of the Third Aliyah, and became known as "the painter of Jerusalem".

== Early life ==
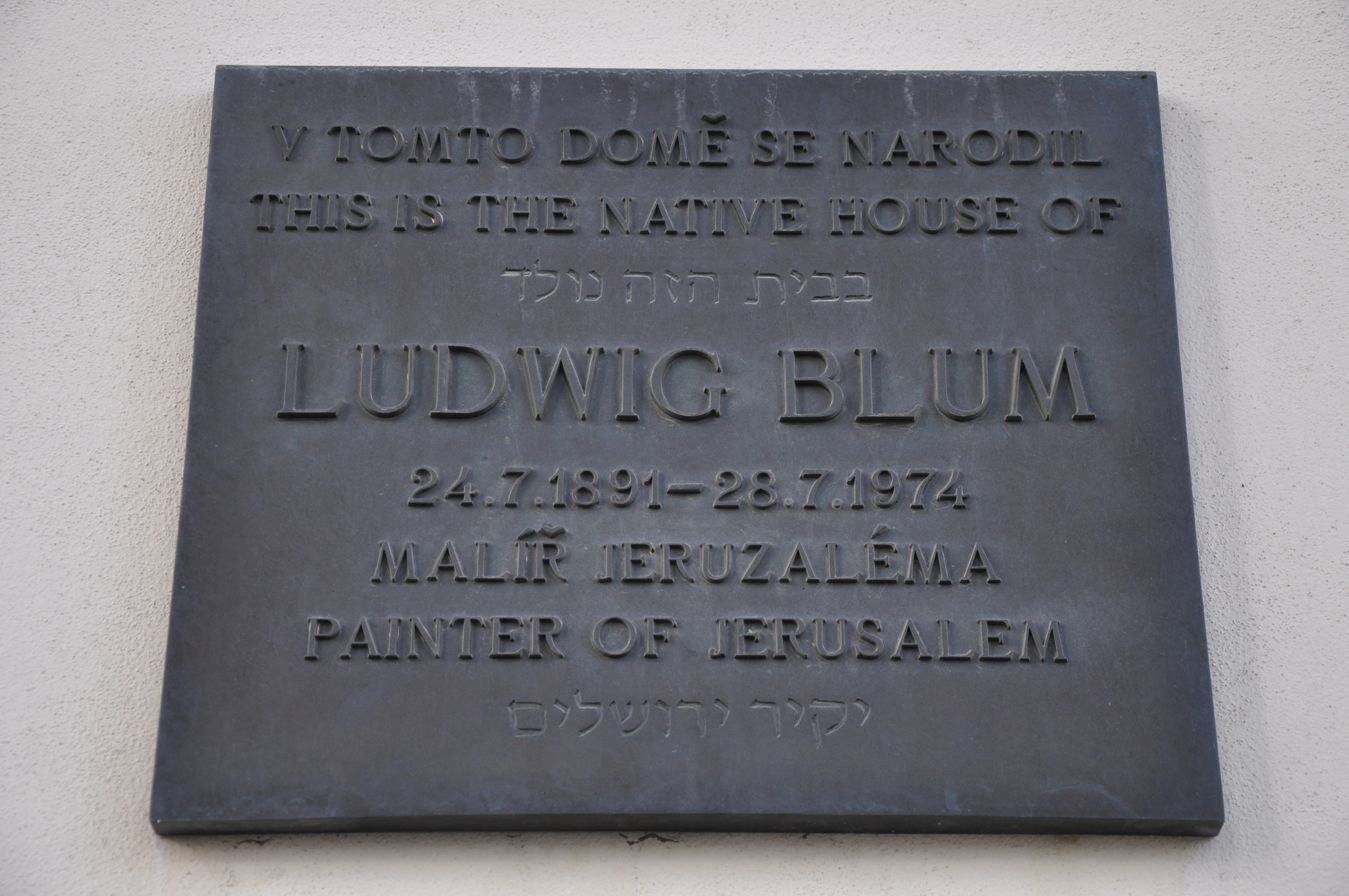
Memorial plaque in Brno-Líšeň

Ludwig Blum was born in 1891 in Líšeň (now part of Brno), Margraviate of Moravia. He immigrated to Mandatory Palestine in 1923, as part of the Third Aliyah. He served in the First World War. He was privately educated in Vienna and later attended the Academy of Fine Arts in Prague.

== Career ==
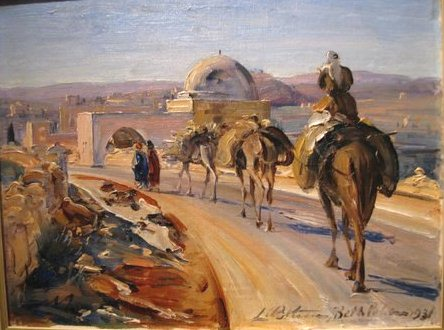
1939 painting of Rachel's Tomb by Ludwig Blum

Upon his arrival in Mandatory Palestine, and as a dedicated Zionist, Blum started paintings scenes of everyday life and landscapes in Israel. He did many paintings of Jerusalem (including the Western Wall and the Mount of Olives), Tel Aviv, the Sea of Galilee and the Judaean Mountains. Additionally, he painted some kibbutzes: Kiryat Anavim and Degania Alef, and the lives of Israeli soldiers, including the Palmach. He also painted copper mines in the Timna Valley. He also painted the Arch of Constantine in Rome, Italy, and a vase of roses.

Blum became known as "the painter of Jerusalem". In 1933, his painting entitled simply Jerusalem was honoured at the Royal Academy of Arts in London. In 1967, he received the Yakir Yerushalayim from the City of Jerusalem.

In 2011 the Museum of Biblical Art in Manhattan held an exhibition of Blum's paintings.

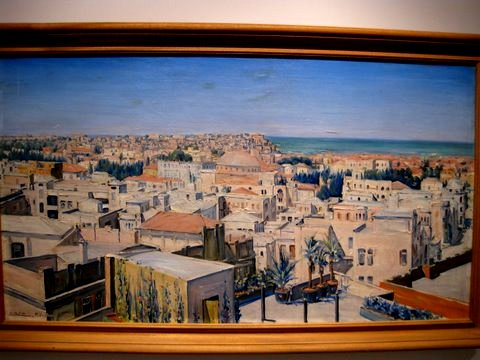
Tel Aviv, 1927

== Death ==
Blum died in 1974 in Jerusalem.

== Selected paintings ==
- Jerusalem in the Snow (1927).
- Jerusalem, Temple Mount (1928).
- Vase of Rose (1931).
- Kibbutz Kiryat Anavim (1932).
- Kibbutz Degania (1934).
- The Judea mountains (1943).
- The Arch of Constantine (1944).
- Jerusalem, seen from Mount Scopus (1950).
- The Market in Jerusalem (1950).
- View of Jerusalem from the Hill of Evil Counsel (1951).
- Landscape (1956).
- Timna, Copper Mines (1957).
- View of Jerusalem (1962).
- Jerusalem, David's Tower and the Sultan's Pool, seen from Mishkanot Shaananim (1964).
- The Western Wall.
- The walled city of Jerusalem from the Mount of Olives.
- Sea of Galilee.
- Portrait with a keffiyeh.

== See also ==
- List of Orientalist artists
- Orientalism
