= SOR CN 12 =

Type of Czech intercity bus

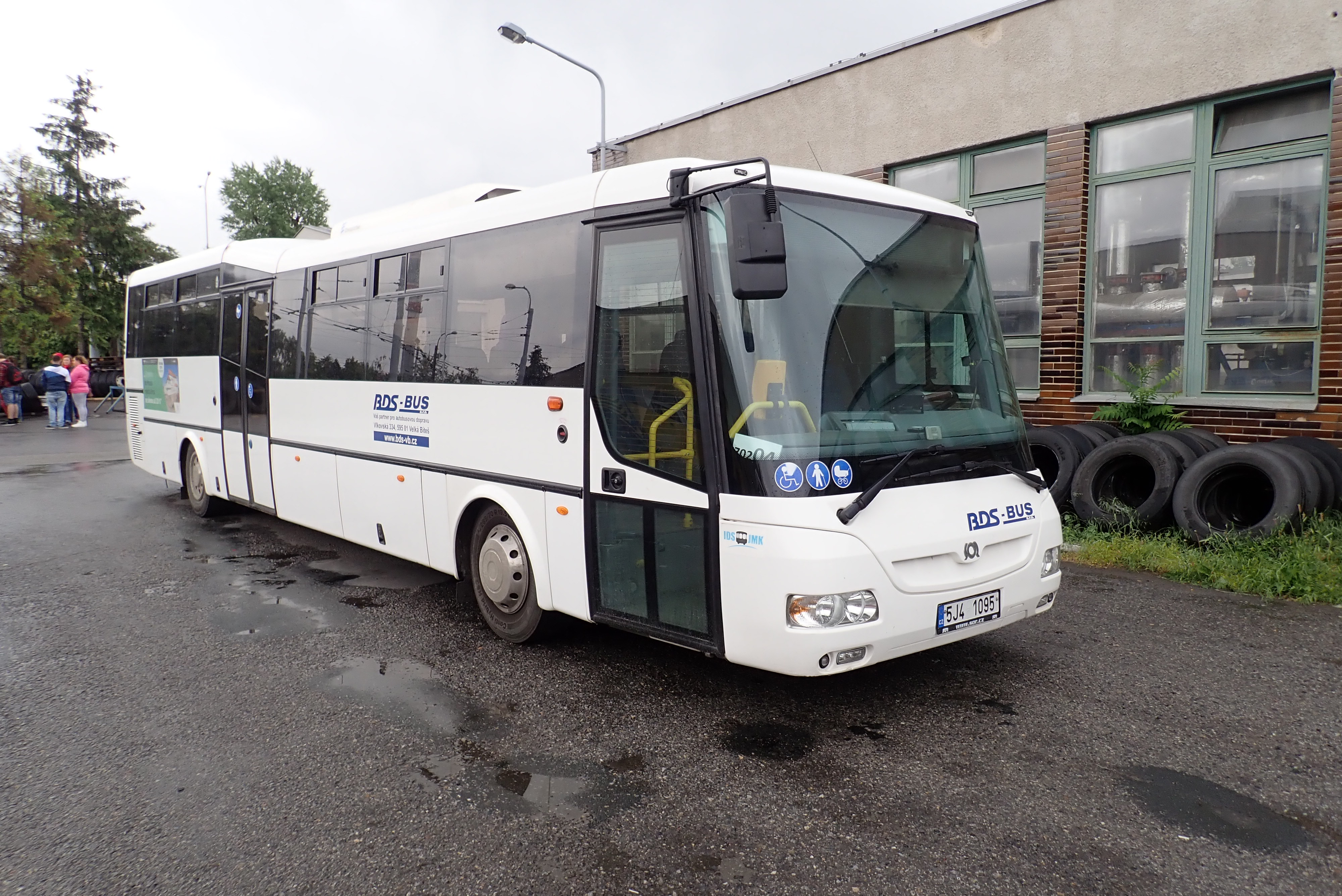
- SOR CN12 in Brno-Slatina, Czech Republic

Overview
- Manufacturer: SOR

Body and chassis
- Doors: 2
- Floor type: Low-entry

Powertrain
- Engine: IVECO Tector NEF V6 Diesel engine
- Capacity: 42 sitting 41 standing
- Power output: 194 kW (260 hp)
- Transmission: ZF 6-speed manual

Dimensions
- Length: 11,790 mm (464.2 in)
- Width: 2,525 mm (99.4 in)
- Height: 3,000 mm (118.1 in)
- Curb weight: 8,800 kg (19,400 lb)

SOR CN12 is a low-entry intercity bus produced by Czech bus manufacturer SOR since 2004.

== Construction features ==
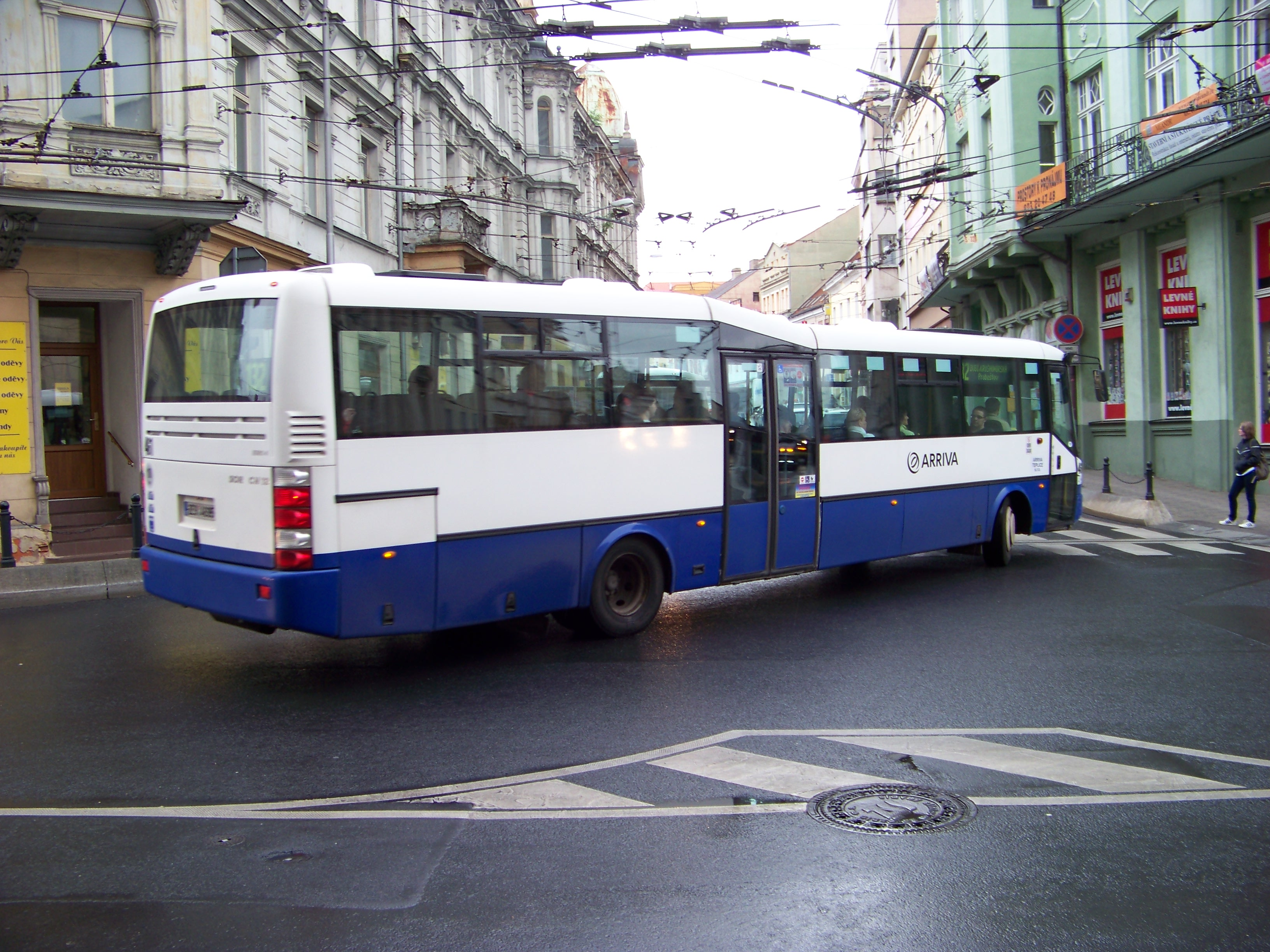
SOR CN 12 side/rear

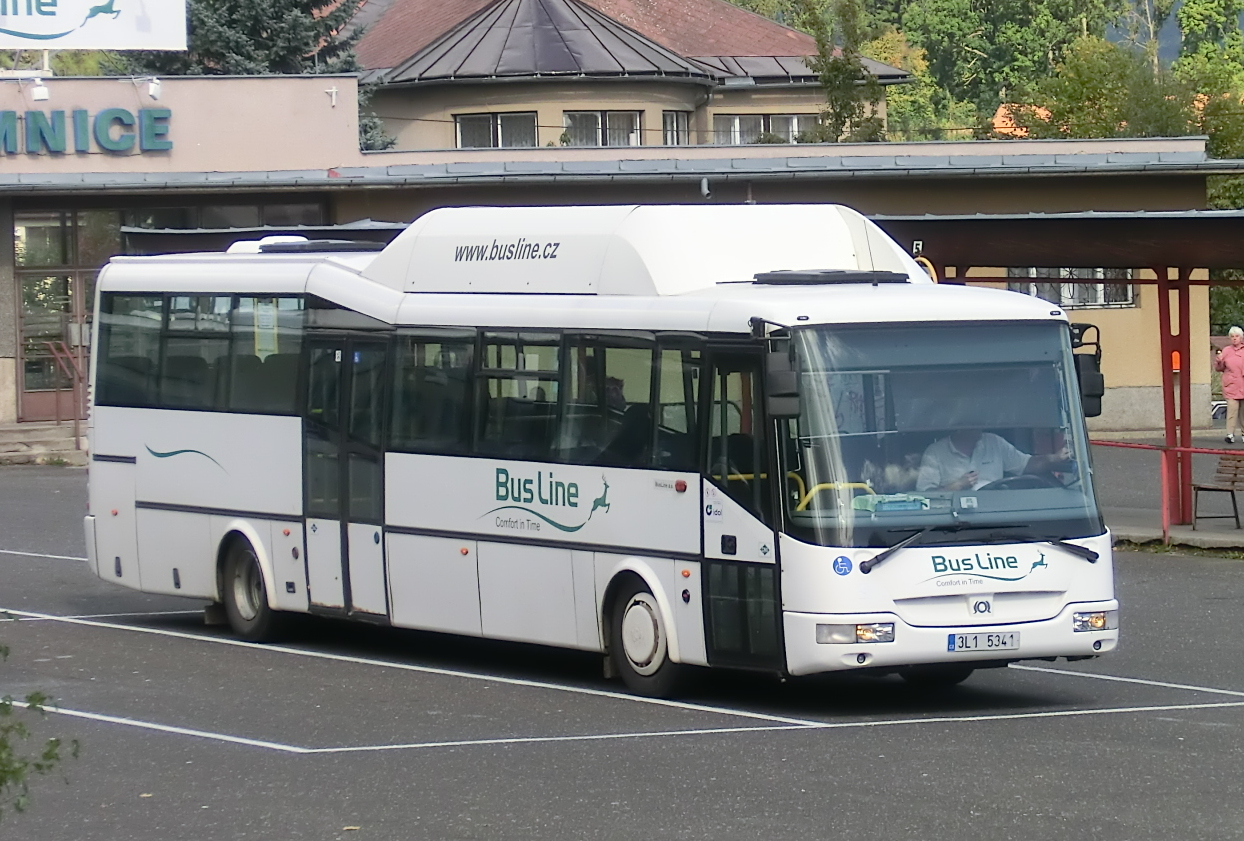
SOR CNG 12

SOR CN 12 is two-axle, while the space ahead of the rear axle is a low-floor. The driven axle is the rear axle and engine with gearbox is located under the floor in the rear. Vehicle body is welded from steel sections, outside is flashing, inside lined with plastic sheeting. Cab is closed. The front axle is a brand SOR, rear solid axle is brand DANA.

Low-floor is approximately in two thirds of the bus, while in the low-floor section located at a height of 360 mm above the ground. To the rear of the vehicle, under which is hidden drivetrain, has two steps (as part of a low-floor and the last door). A similar solution is quite common for other producers and indicates the general concept of low-entry (loosely translated as "vehicle with low starting edge"), respectively. abbreviation LE. In the case of the bus SOR CN 12 However, this solution is unique variable height of the roof of the vehicle, popularly known as "hump".

== Production and operation ==
CN 12 is two-door model of SOR BN 12, which is more suitable for intercity transportation, and was later renamed to SOR CN 12. Initially, however, was SOR CN 12 known as "SOR BN 12 two-door".

== See also ==
- List of buses
