= Brno-Židenice =

- City District of Brno
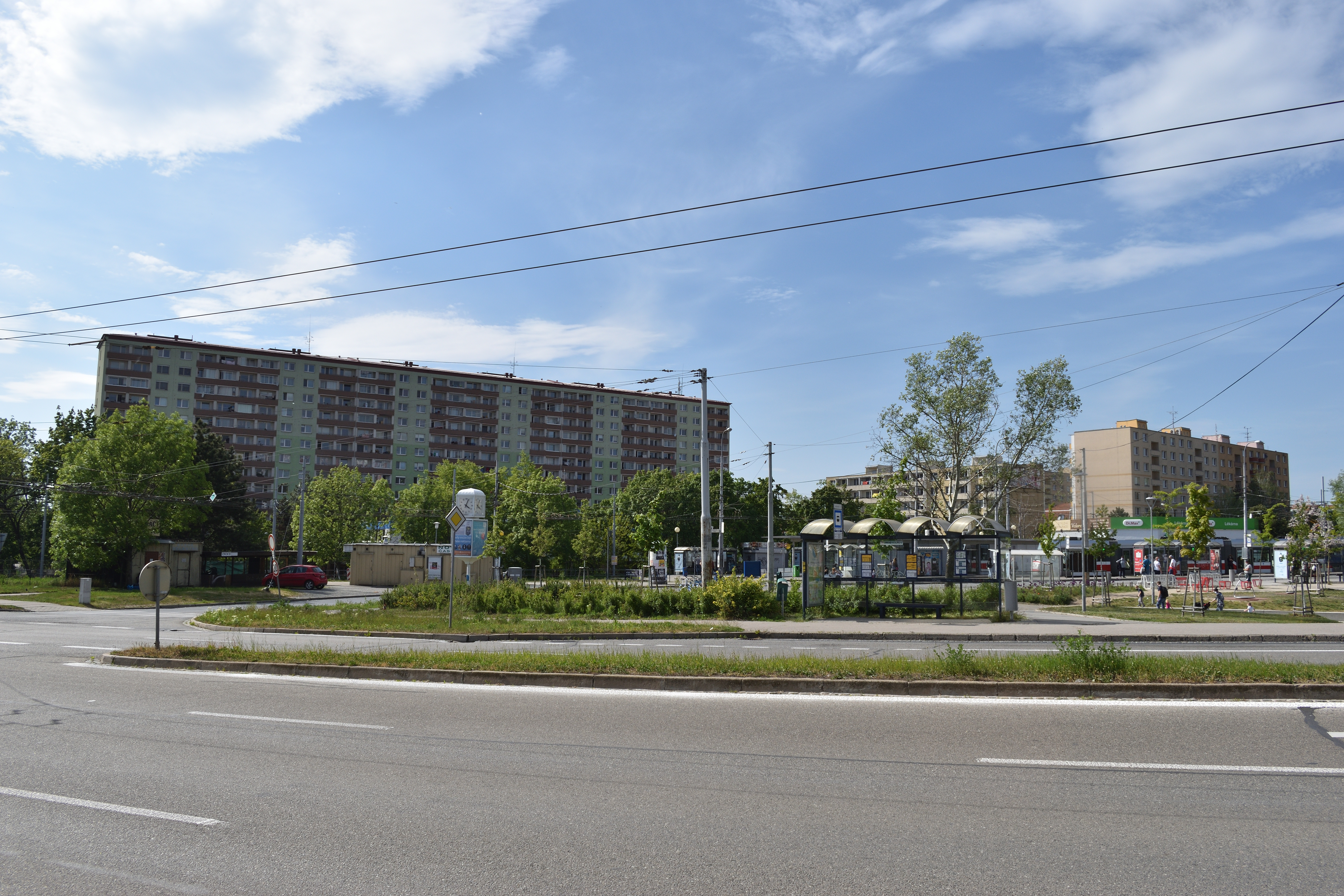
- Stará osada

- Flag Coat of arms

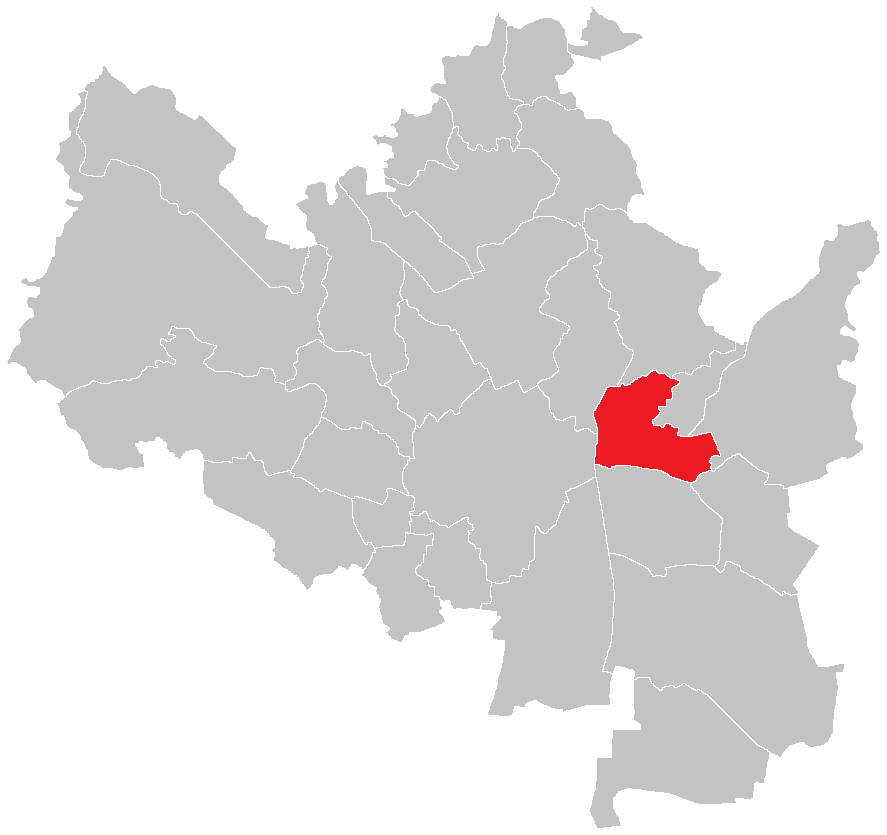
- Location of Brno-Židenice in Brno 49°11′46″N 16°38′51″E
- Country: Czech Republic
- Region: South Moravian Region
- City: Brno

Government
  - Mayor: Petr Kunc

Area
  - Total: 5.05 km^{2} (1.95 sq mi)

Population (2023)
  - Total: 23,042
  - Density: 4,560/km^{2} (11,800/sq mi)
- Time zone: UTC+1 (CET)
  - Summer (DST): UTC+2 (CEST)
- Postal code: 615 00, 636 00
- Website: https://www.zidenice.eu/

Brno-Židenice is a city district in Brno, Czech Republic, located east of the city's historical center. It consists of the eastern part of the municipal part and cadastral territory of Zábrdovice and most of Židenice. Its total area is 5.05 km^{2}. The city district was established on November 24, 1990, its office is located in Židenice. Over 22,000 people live here.

For the purposes of the senate elections, Brno-Židenice is included in electoral district number 58 of Brno-City District.

== History ==
The first written reports about Židenice are from the beginning of the 13th century. The Until 1784, Židenice and Zábrdovice were the property of the Zábrdovice monastery. In 1786, the settlement of Juliánov was established on the land of the abolished Julia court, which belonged to the Zábrdovice monastery until 1784, in the area of today's Vančura Street, which became an independent municipality in 1787; however, it continued to form part of the cadastral territory of Židenice. On July 6, 1850, Zábrdovice was annexed to Brno, while Židenice and Juliánov were united in the same year into a single municipality of Židenice, with Juliánov having its own councellor. Due to problems with the administration, in 1867, under the pressure of the Juliánov chronicler Filip Lang, Juliánov became independent, but its territory continued to form part of the cadastral territory of Židenice. At the beginning of the 20th century, the northernmost houses of the then independent village of Černovice were built in the south of the territory of the modern Brno-Židenice district, reaching as far as the southern side of Židenice's Táborská street (Životského, Jeronýmova, Porhajmova streets). On April 16, 1919, most of the territory of the modern city district was annexed to Brno, including the then municipalities of Juliánov, Židenice and the cadastral territories of Černovice and Maloměřice, while from 1920 until the establishment of the Protectorate of Bohemia and Moravia, these 4 former municipalities had their own local committees within Brno limited powers. During the period of the First Republic, there was a complete fusion of the buildings in Židenice and Juliánov. In the years 1922–1930, electrification was carried out in Juliánov and Židenice, and in 1925, health-safe water began to be supplied to houses. In 1929, the borders with Zábrdovice, Husovice and Maloměřice were adjusted, when Zábrdovice was slightly expanded at the expense of Židenice. The borders of Židenice were further adjusted during the first cadastral reform of Brno in 1941, when the border with Zábrdovice was corrected.

At the turn of the 1950s and 1960s, the Juliánov panel housing estate with 1,313 apartments was built in Židenice south of the original Juliánov, on abandoned fields near Bělohorská street, according to the project of architect Pavel Krchňák. In the years 1971–1979, the original village core of Židenice, which was the street Stará osada and its surroundings, was demolished, on the site of which a new panel housing estate of the same name was built. At the same time, the last remnants of the former mill drive of Svitavská strouha, which formed the border between Židenice and Zábrdovice until the second half of the 1960s, were buried. In the years 1975–1979, at the expense of street development, a stretch of a large urban ring road was built across the densely populated part of the territory of the current city district. In the 1980s, the historical core of Juliánov was subsequently demolished. During the Velvet Revolution, Civic Forum committees were activated in various parts of the modern city district, demanding an urgent solution to long-unsolved local problems. In 1990, the response to their activities was the creation of the city district of Brno-Židenice.

Since 1992, intensive reconstruction of apartment buildings has been taking place in the district. Under Bíla hora, near Bělohorská street, construction of a modern complex of apartment buildings has been underway since 2002. In recent years, roads have also been reconstructed, the condition of which was not always completely optimal. In terms of further development, larger projects are also being considered, such as the construction of a new swimming pool at Viniční street. In 2017, the Bohumil Hrabal park with a fruit alley began to emerge on the slope of the Židenice hill in the horticultural colony.

== Description ==
The territory of the city district of Brno-Židenice, which has an urban character, borders the neighboring city district of Brno-Vinohrady in a sickle shape. The western half of the city district, roughly bounded by the city's ring road, is almost completely flat. Conversely, east of this road, the terrain begins to rise. To the east of Bělohorská street, Bílá hora (White Mountain) begins to rise, and to the north of it, near the building of the local polyclinic, the Židenice hill rises again. On the northwestern slope of the Židenice hill near the border with Brno-Vinohrady, there is also the local forest park Akátky, which is one of the two forest parks in the territory of the Brno-Židenice district. The second forest park, located above Juliánov on Bílá hora, offers a view of Brno near the monument. Both forest parks are used by local citizens for walks. There are also two housing estates on the territory of the municipality: the more northerly housing estate in the vicinity of Stará Osada, and the more extensive Juliánov, located in the southeast of the municipality. In the very south of the town, south of the original Juliánov, near tram line number 8, is the area of the Jewish cemetery in Brno.

== Neighboring districts ==
The territory of the Brno-Židenice district borders on the west with the Brno-střed and Brno-sever districts, on the north with the Brno-Maloměřice an Obřany districts, on the east with the Brno-Vinohrady and Brno-Líšeň districts, on the southeast with Brno-Slatina, and in the south with Brno-Černovice.

== Demographics ==
The population is now growing again after three decades of rapid decline. Foreigners make up 22% of the population.

Historical population

Year	Pop.	±%
1869	3,067	—
1880	3,473	+13.2%
1890	6,367	+83.3%
1900	11,326	+77.9%
1910	17,904	+58.1%

Year	Pop.	±%
1921	17,870	−0.2%
1930	27,680	+54.9%
1950	27,206	−1.7%
1961	29,180	+7.3%
1970	31,061	+6.4%

Year	Pop.	±%
1980	26,421	−14.9%
1991	21,174	−19.9%
2001	20,376	−3.8%
2011	22,000	+8.0%
2021	22,573	+2.6%

Source: Censuses

== Economy ==
Alstom, which owns one of the premises of the former První brněnská strojírna engineering company, currently belongs to the most important companies in the district. Another important enterprise is the Incinerator and communal waste Brno a.s. (JACKET). In the Zábrdovice part of the city, there is also an extensive area of the once famous Zbrojovka Brno factory on the banks of the Svitava. The Kaufland supermarket has the strongest position in the area of shops, but the Albert store in Stará osada or the newly built Tesco supermarket in the Juliánov housing estate also remain important. The LeRK shopping center is also located in the northeast of the city, offering floor coverings and consumer electronics. Mainly in Táborská, Bělohorská and Gajdošova streets there are a number of small shops as well as several pubs.

== Education ==
There are 4 elementary schools in the district: Tyršova elementary school at Kuldova 38, ZŠ Gajdošova at Gajdošova 3, focused on Montessori teaching, Masaryk elementary school at Kamenačky 4 and ZŠ Krásného at Krásného 24, offering extended teaching of music, art and English. There is also a Zbyněk Mrkos Basic Art School PhDr., which is located at Došlíkova 48.

There is also a private Art Management High School located at Táborská 185 and a private Rašín High School located at Šámalov 60.

== Transport ==
The railway line in the direction from Brno to Svitavy passes through the town, and there is also a railway station with a branch. Due to its small distance from the city center, the district has a very dense road network, which enables it to have good transport connections with the surrounding districts. The territory of the city district is partially crossed from north to south by the four-lane route of the so-called large city ring road, which provides a connection with the city districts of Brno-Černovice and Brno-Maloměřice an Obřany. However, this road, which is often congested on working days, also has a negative impact on the quality of living in the surrounding houses. However, you can also get to the Brno-Černovice district from Životského street. Another important route is road I/642, which provides a transport connection with the Brno-Vinohrady district, which can also be reached via Líšeňská street and a subsequent turn onto Křtinská street. Through the edge of the Brno-Vinohrady district, you can also reach Brno-Líšeň. Another important route offering a direct connection with Brno-Líšeň is the four-lane road on Jedovnická street, passing around the area of the Brno incinerator. This road can be reached via Bělohorská street. The road on Bubeníčkova and Zábrdovická streets provides a transport connection with Brno-sever, which connects to the already mentioned route of the large city ring near the district office.

Public transport connections with other parts of the city are provided by the transport company of the city of Brno, via tram lines 2, 3, 8 and 9, bus lines 44, 55, 58, 64, 74, 75, E75, 78, 82 and 84, trolleybus lines 25 and 26 (to Kamenný Vrch, to Starý Lískovec and to Líšeň), 27 (to Brno-Vinohrady) and night bus lines N89, N97 and N98.
