= Museum of Biblical Art =

Museum of Biblical Art may refer to:

- Museum of Biblical Art (Dallas)
- Museum of Biblical Art (New York City)
