= Brno-Černovice =

- City District of Brno
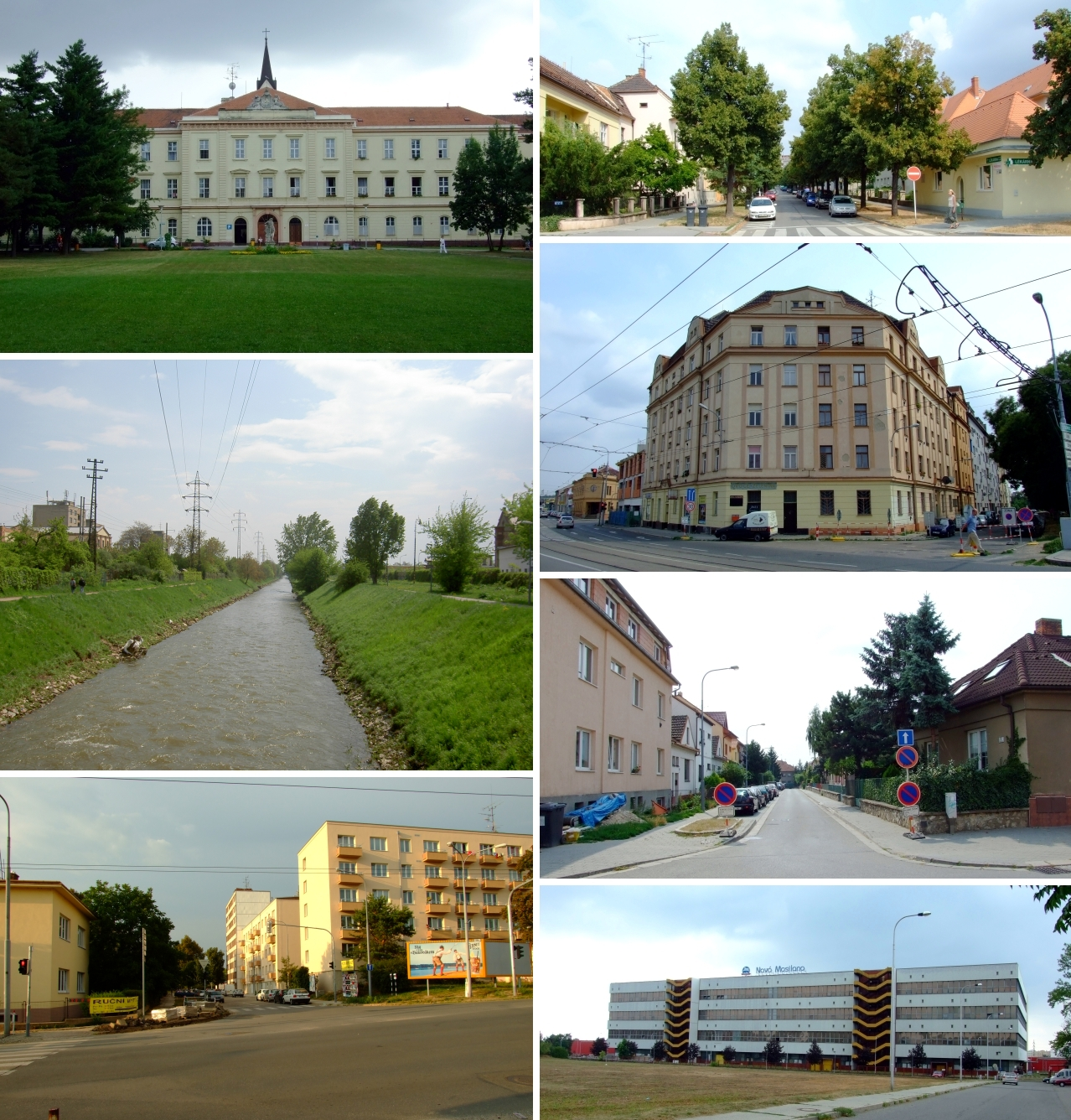

- Flag Coat of arms

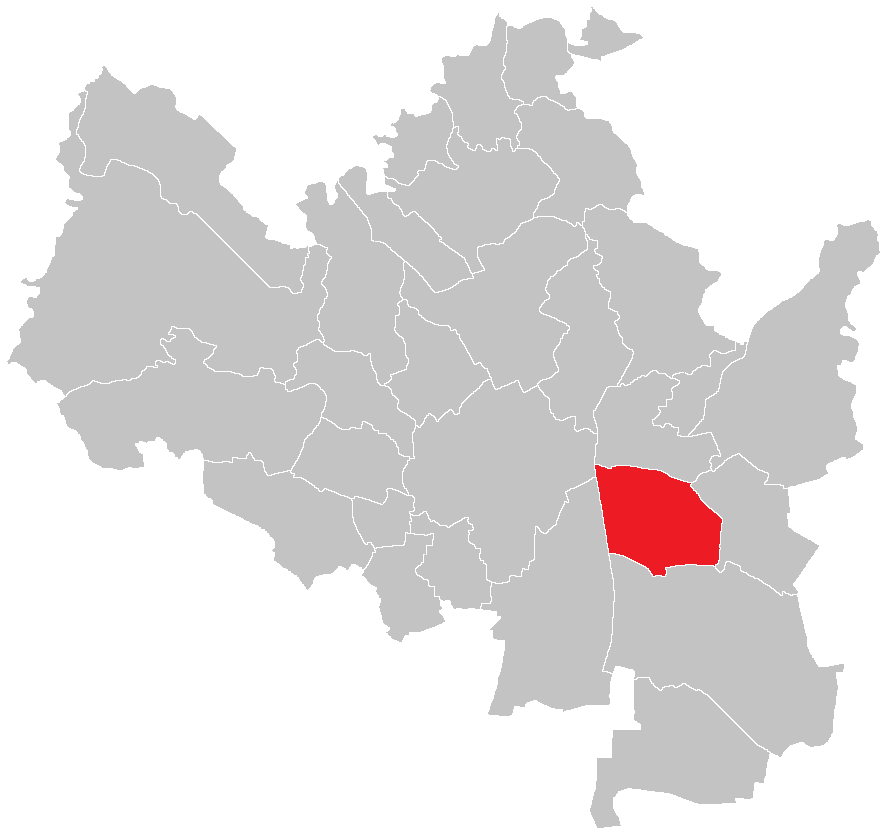
- Location of Brno-Černovice in Brno 49°10′58″N 16°38′13″E
- Country: Czech Republic
- Region: South Moravian Region
- City: Brno

Government
  - Mayor: Petra Quittová (STAN)

Area
  - Total: 6.29 km^{2} (2.43 sq mi)

Population (2023)
  - Total: 8,490
  - Density: 1,350/km^{2} (3,500/sq mi)
- Time zone: UTC+1 (CET)
  - Summer (DST): UTC+2 (CEST)
- Postal code: 618 00
- Website: https://www.brno-cernovice.cz/

Brno-Černovice (German: Czernowitz) is a city district of Brno, Czech Republic, located in the southeastern part of the city. It is coextensive with the municipal part and cadastral territory of Černovice, which used to be an independent municipality until it was annexed into Brno in 1919. Its area is 6.29 km^{2}. The city district was established on November 24, 1990. Over 8,000 people live here.

For the purposes of the senate elections, the territory of Brno-Černovice is included in electoral district number 58 of the Brno-City District.

== Etymology ==
The name is said to be related to the territory on which the district is located; the area was once swampy, as evidenced by the names of the surrounding districts, Slatina and Komárov. And Černovice could be ""black ground" or "black air" with swarms of mosquitoes.

== History ==
=== Early history and urban development ===
Černovice was founded more than 700 years ago. In 1645, during the siege of Brno by Swedish troops, the village was extensively damaged. In the years 1861–1863, north of old Černovice, a provincial psychiatric hospital (today the Brno Psychiatric Hospital) was built with Neo-Renaissance buildings, located in the "green" part of this district. From the 1770s, the development of Nové Černovice was created, which was completed during the period of the First Republic. In the 1930s, the emergency workers' colony of Černovičky was established in the east of the then Černovice cadastre, belonging to the cadastre of neighboring Slatina since 1969. In 1959, on the eastern edge of Nové Černovice, in the area of today's Kneslova and Krausova streets, the very first Brno panel housing estate began to be built.

=== Annexation to Brno ===
The territory of the modern district of Brno-Černovice was annexed to Brno gradually in several stages:

On July 6, 1850, a block of houses between Olomoucká, Tržní and Zvěřinova streets, then belonging to Zábrdovice, became part of Brno.

In 1869, the area of the psychiatric hospital in Černovice was annexed to Brno, as a newly created cadastral territory of Zábrdovice II, completely separated from the rest of Brno. At the same time, the existing cadastral territory of Zábrdovice was renamed to Zábrdovice I.

On July 27, 1884 (according to the data from the cadastral map from the compulsory imperial copies of the stable cadastre), parcels on both sides of the western part of Olomoucká street, which had previously formed part of the cadastre of the municipality of Černovice, were annexed to Brno (these plots of land were simultaneously annexed within Brno to the cadastral territory of Zábrdovice I).

On March 31, 1898 (according to the data from the indicative sketch of the cadastral territory of Černovice dated 1873 - the signature of this indicative sketch stored in the Moravian Library Archives is MOR038118730) based on the decree of the regional financial directorate in Brno, the territory in the northwest of the then Černovice cadastre was annexed to Brno, which included part of Masná street, a short section of Mlýnská street, Porážka street and a block of houses between Stinná, Elišky Krásnohorské and Spojka streets. Within Brno, this area was attached to the cadastral territory of Trnitá.

On April 16, 1919, the municipality of Černovice itself was annexed to Brno, as well as the municipalities of Ivanovice (today called Brněnské Ivanovice) and Komárov, whose cadastres also extended to the territory of the modern district of Brno-Černovice.

=== Changes to the cadastral boundaries of Černovice ===
In addition to the above-mentioned changes to the cadastral boundary of Černovice, related to the annexation to Brno, other changes also occurred during the first cadastral reform of Brno in 1941, and the second cadastral reform of Brno from 1966 to 1969, when Černovice acquired its current cadastral boundaries. In 1941, Černovice regained a small area with the aforementioned block at Elišky Krásnohorské street. However, a fundamental change in the cadastral boundaries of Černovice occurred only during the second cadastral reform of Brno from 1966 to 1969. Until then, their cadastre also included some undeveloped land on the right bank of the Svitava, which today is part of the cadastral territory of Komárov, several blocks in the south of today's cadastre of Židenice, Černovický hájek in the current cadastre of Brněnské Ivanovice, and the territory that today forms the western part of the cadastre of Slatina ( Černovičky, barracks, Lidl premises, train station).[4] At that time, Černovice, on the other hand, acquired Zábrdovice houses south of Olomoucká street (but part of the land here belonged to Černovice until 1884) and land to the south, which originally belonged to Brněnské Ivanovice and Komárov.

=== Development of administrative jurisdiction since 1945 ===
In the years 1945–1946, the whole of the then Černovice cadastre formed the self-governing district of Brno-Černovice with its own local committee. Other parts of the modern city district were under the jurisdiction of Komárov and Brněnské Ivanovice. For the purposes of this article, it was unfortunately not possible to find out the administrative jurisdiction of the land belonging to the Zábrdovice cadastre at that time.

From 1947 to 1949, the entire Cadastre of Černovice was part of the Brno VII municipal district. At that time, the Zábrdovice part of the modern city district belonged to the Brno I municipal district.

1949–1954, most of the territory of the then Černovice cadastre belonged to the Brno X municipal district (territory lying on the left bank of the Svitava), the small western part of the Černovice cadastre (today, however, no longer belonging to Černovice) located on the right bank of the Svitava was divided between the Brno XI and Brno municipal districts IV; part of Brno X at that time was also part of the modern Černovice cadastre, then belonging to Zábrdovice; parcels in the south of the modern territory of the city district of Brno-Černovice, which at that time formed part of the cadastral territories of Komárov and Brněnská Ivanovice, belonged to the municipal district of Brno XIII.

In the years 1954–1964, the eastern parts of the then Černovice cadastre on the left bank of the Svitava formed part of the Brno VI municipal district, the small western part of the cadastre lying on the right bank of the Svitava belonged to the Brno IV municipal district; The part of Brno VI was also then the part of modern Černovice from Zábrdovice. The southern parts of the modern Černovice cadastre, which at that time belonged to Komárov and Brněnský Ivanovice, belonged in the years 1954–1960 to the Brno X-Tuřany district, then from 1960 to 1971 to the Tuřany district.

since 1964, the entire Cadastre of Černovice belonged to the municipal district of Brno IV. After the second cadastral reform of Brno, another administrative reform took place in 1971, and then until November 23, 1990, the entire Cadastre of Černovice (already within the current boundaries) was part of the Brno IV municipal district.

Since November 24, 1990, Černovice has been one of the city districts of Brno under the name Brno-Černovice.

== Territorial divisions ==
The cadastral territory of Černovice is further divided into 10 basic settlement units.

Basic settlement unit	Population		
Basic settlement unit	2011	2021	Change
Tržní	489	651	+33.1%
Charbulova	2,052	2,203	+7.4%
Slámova	2,157	2,129	-1.3%
Kneslova	2,284	2,242	-1.8%
Léčebný ústav	352	443	+25.9%
Faměrovo náměstí	660	652	-1.2%
Hájecká	11	11	+0%
Černovická terasa	0	0	+0%
Pod vlárskou tratí	19	18	-5.3%
Pod pískovnou	0	25	-

== Demographics ==
As of the 2021 census, the population is 8,374, up 4% from 8,024 in the 2011 census. The population peaked at 12,726 in 1961.

Historical population

Year	Pop.	±%
1869	543	—
1880	781	+43.8%
1890	1,405	+79.9%
1900	2,202	+56.7%
1910	3,057	+38.8%

Year	Pop.	±%
1921	3,447	+12.8%
1930	7,111	+106.3%
1950	10,145	+42.7%
1961	12,726	+25.4%
1970	11,141	−12.5%

Year	Pop.	±%
1980	8,619	−22.6%
1991	7,221	−16.2%
2001	7,263	+0.6%
2011	8,024	+10.5%
2021	8,374	+4.4%

Source: Censuses

== Geography ==
Černovice consists of the smaller Old Černovice and the larger New Černovice, between which the area of the local psychiatric hospital is located near the building of the local textile plant Nová Mosilana. While Nové Černovice has an urban character with mostly First Republic houses, old Černovice has a village character. Originally mainly focused on agriculture and gardening, Černovice is currently turning into an industrial district in its peripheral parts. An example can be the change of the former Černovice airport into the industrial area of Černovice terrace. The inconsistency of this territory is evidenced by the fairly close proximity of the Brno city landfill Černovice and a small piece of the original natural landscape Černovický hájek (today, however, it no longer belongs to Černovice).

The city district of Brno-Černovice borders the city districts of Brno-Slatina to the east, Brno-Židenice to the north and Brno-střed and Brno-jih to the west, while here its western border runs along the western (right) bank of the river Svitava (as can be seen from the territorial plan of the city of Brno), in the south it borders Brno-Tuřany.

== Sights ==
- Brno Psychiatric Hospital - Neo-Renaissance hospital built in 1863, surrounded by a public park
- St. Florian's Church – Neo-Gothic church built in 1898 in the village (Famérovo náměstí), demolished in 1960
