= SOR BN 12 =

Type of Czech city bus

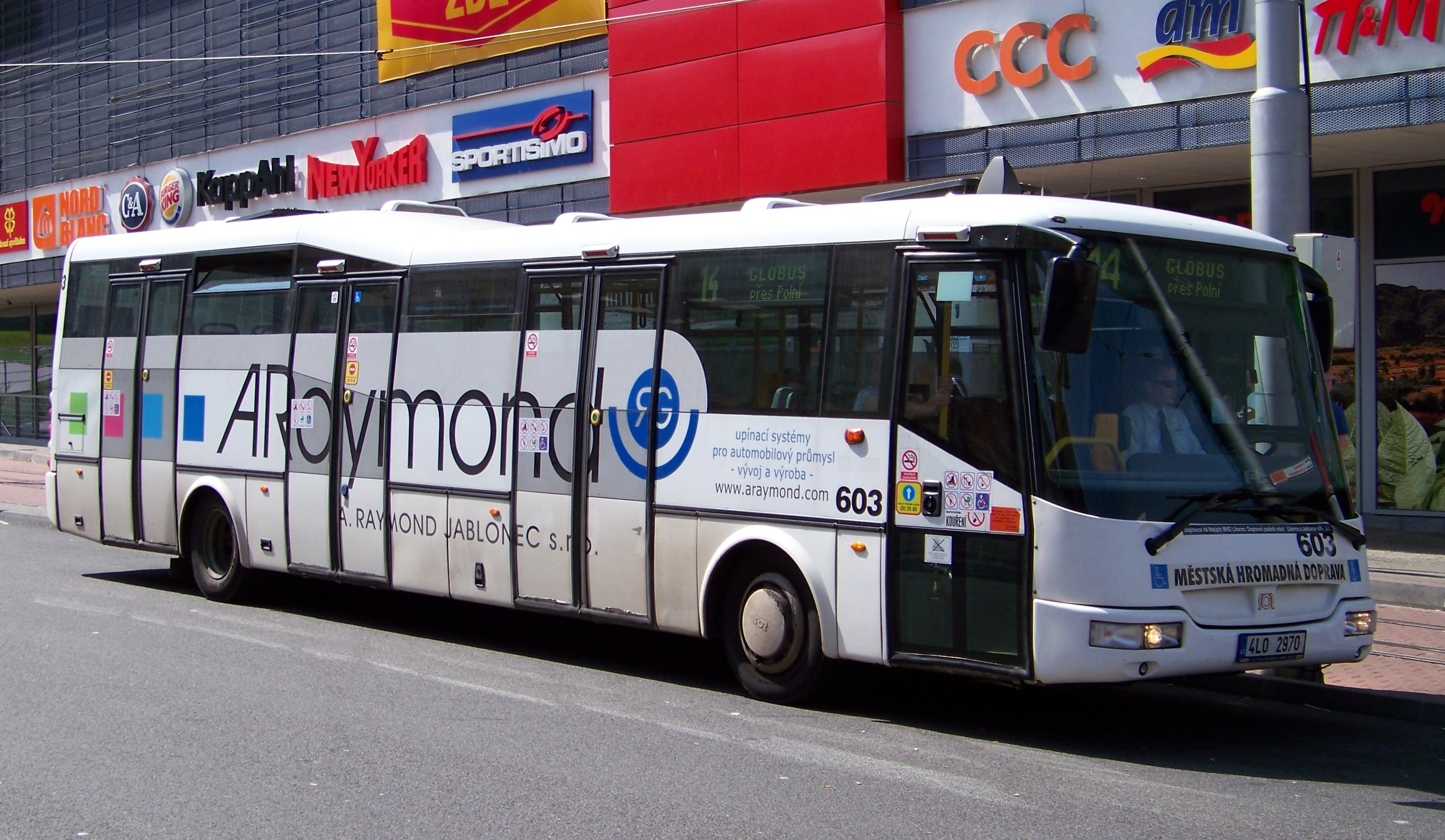
- SOR BN 12 in Liberec, Czech Republic

Overview
- Manufacturer: SOR
- Assembly: Czech Republic

Body and chassis
- Doors: 2, 3 or 4
- Floor type: Low entry

Powertrain
- Engine: IVECO Tector NEF I6 Diesel engine
- Capacity: 31 seated 75 standing
- Power output: 194 kW (260 hp)
- Transmission: ZF 6-speed manual Allison 6-speed automatic

Dimensions
- Length: 11,790 mm (464.2 in)
- Width: 2,525 mm (99.4 in)
- Height: 3,000 mm (118.1 in)
- Curb weight: 8,800 kg (19,400 lb)

The SOR BN 12 is a low-entry single-decker bus produced by Czech bus manufacturer SOR since 2003.

== Construction ==
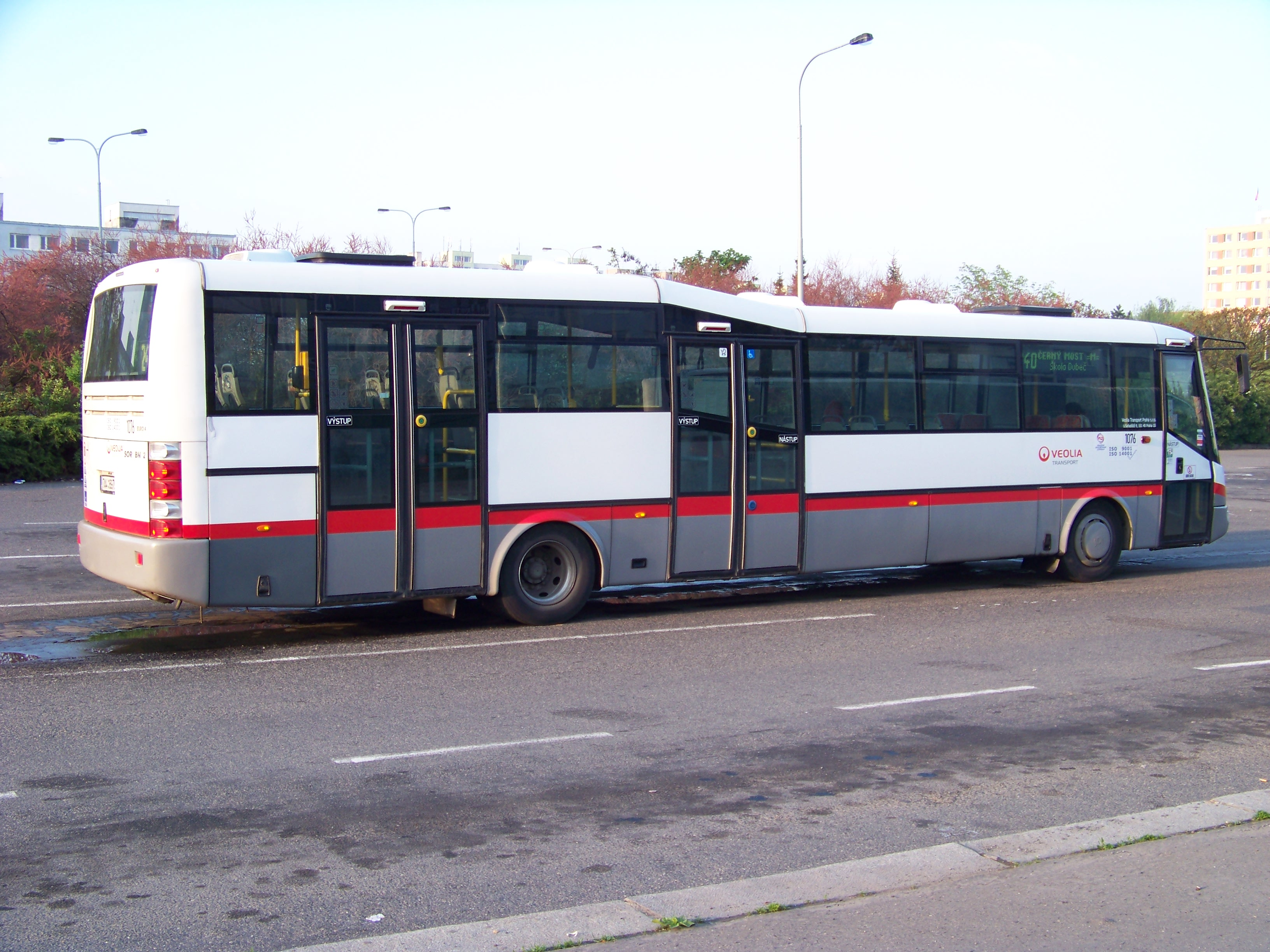
Veolia Transport Praha SOR BN 12 in 2010

SOR BN 12 was the first at least partially low-floor bus from the production of SOR. Model BN 12 is two-axle, while the space ahead of the rear axle is a low-floor bus. The drive axle is the rear axle and engine with gearbox is located under the floor in the rear. Vehicle body is welded from steel sections, outside is flashing, inside lined with plastic sheeting. Cab is closed. The front axle is a brand SOR, rear solid axle is brand DANA.

Low-floor is approximately in two thirds of the bus, while in the low-floor section located at a height of 360 mm above the ground. To the rear of the vehicle, under which is hidden drivetrain, has two steps (as part of a low-floor and the last door). A similar solution is quite common for other producers and indicates the general concept of low-entry (loosely translated as "vehicle with low starting edge"), respectively. abbreviation LE. In the case of the bus SOR BN 12, However, this solution is unique variable height of the roof of the vehicle, popularly known as "hump".

== Production and operation ==
SOR BN 12, thanks to a favorable price became in a relatively short time spread to many small and medium-sized Czech towns. From the small towns of the Czech Republic, for example, runs them in Chrudim, Louny and Hodonín. They also found application in Liberec, Havirov, several pieces are operated in Prague at the transport company Veolia Transport. SOR BN 12 is also operated in Slovakia, for example in Trnava.

SOR offers great variability of their buses, because in some cities are operated buses SOR BN 12 in the three-door version, in others in a four-door. The two-door model of this vehicle more suitable for intercity transportation, which was later named SOR CN 12. Initially, however, was SOR CN 12 known as "SOR BN 12 two-door".

In parallel with the bus SOR BN 12 is since 2006 manufactured by SOR fully low floor vehicle SOR NB 12. Because it is conceptually (and thus cost) is very different buses SOR BN 12 were after starting of the production of a new model eliminated from the production program.

== Buses running on CNG ==
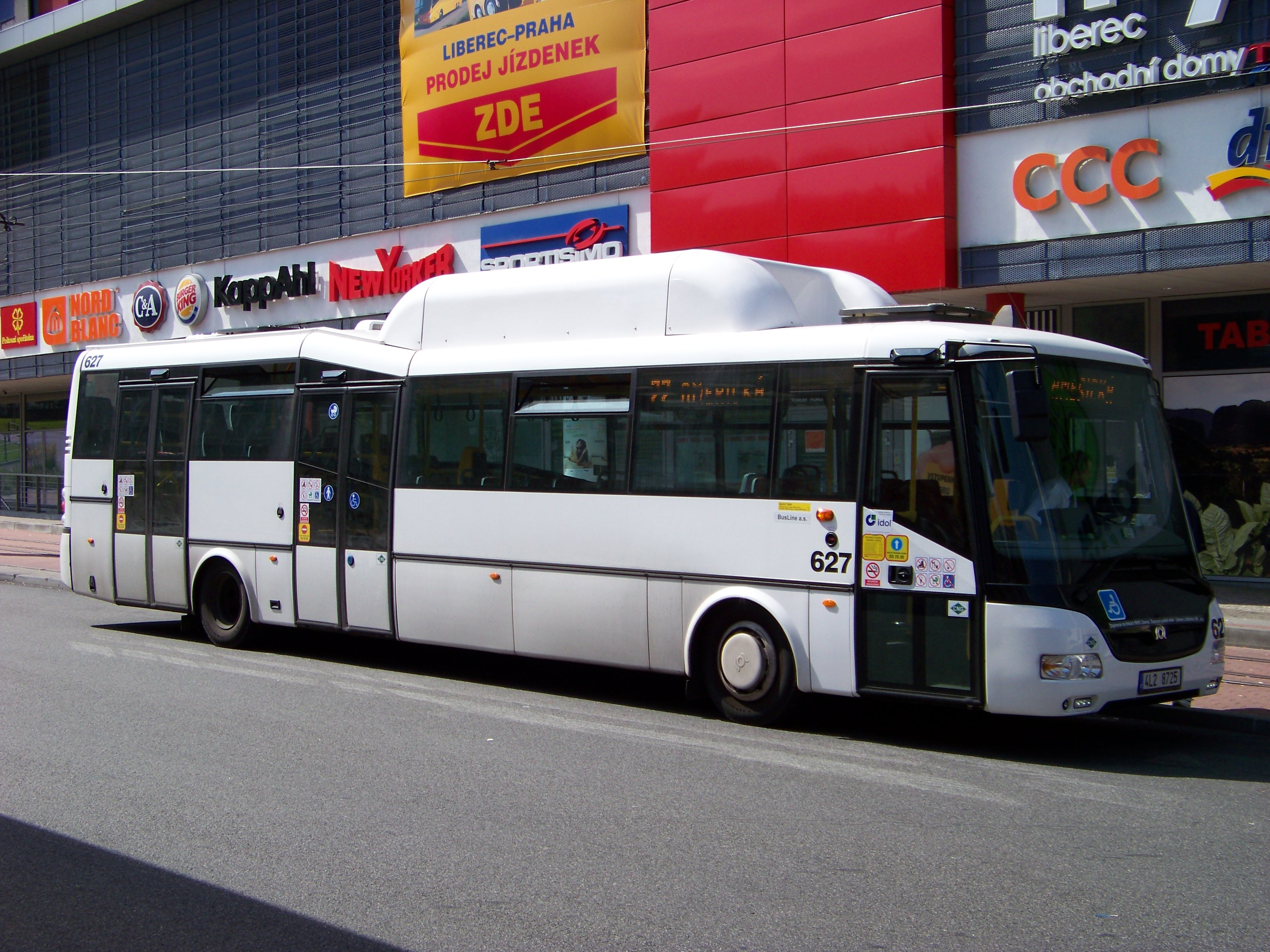
SOR BNG 12

Due to the special shape of the body is SOR BN 12 very popular for conversion to drive with alternative fuel - compressed natural gas ([CNG]). The "hump" on the roof is placed suitable so placing of the gas cylinders is easier, because usually other vehicles have problems with that (aesthetic, capacity and structural).

The first vehicle conversions SOR BN 12 on CNG incurred under the baton of Ekobus. EKOBUS SOR BN 12 - later known as Ekobus City - are equipped with the US-Canadian Cummins Westport engines with fully electronically controlled fuel injection. Later, it came up with the manufacturer's factory CNG version, known as the SOR BNG 12, which is also equipped with motors Cummins Westport.
