= Ochoz u Brna =

- Municipality
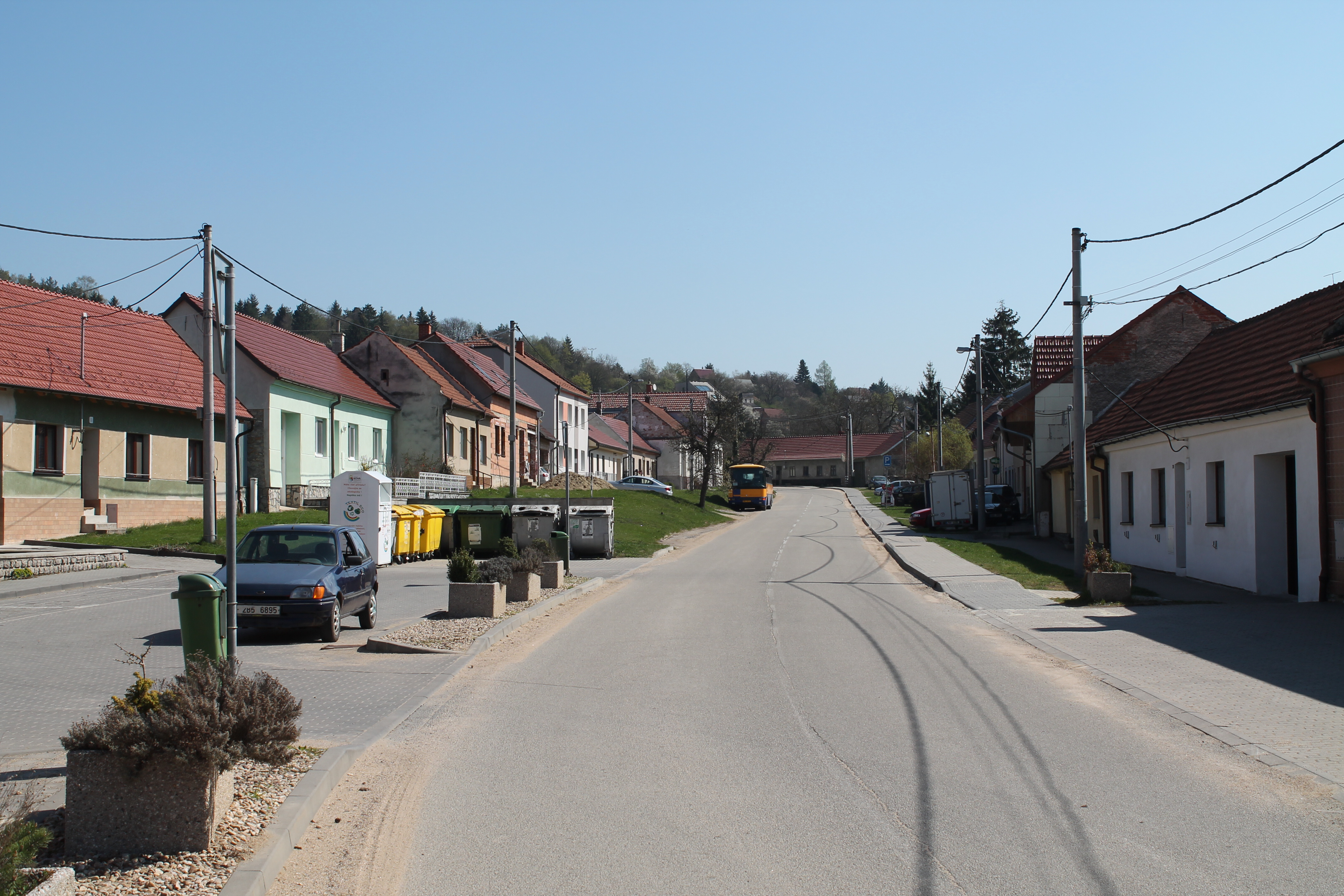
- Common in Ochoz u Brna

- Flag Coat of arms

- Location in the Czech Republic
- Coordinates: 49°15′15″N 16°44′14″E
- Country: Czech Republic
- Region: South Moravian
- District: Brno-Country
- First mentioned: 1237

Area
  - Total: 14.54 km^{2} (5.61 sq mi)
- Elevation: 364 m (1,194 ft)

Population (2026-01-01)
  - Total: 1,574
  - Density: 108.3/km^{2} (280.4/sq mi)
- Time zone: UTC+1 (CET)
  - Summer (DST): UTC+2 (CEST)
- Postal code: 664 02
- Website: www.ochozubrna.cz

Ochoz u Brna is a municipality and village in Brno-Country District in the South Moravian Region of the Czech Republic. It has about 1,600 inhabitants.

Ochoz u Brna lies approximately 11 kilometres (7 mi) north-east of Brno and 191 km (119 mi) south-east of Prague.

== Demographics ==
Historical population
Year	Pop.	±%
1869	885	—
1880	941	+6.3%
1890	995	+5.7%
1900	996	+0.1%
1910	1,054	+5.8%
1921	998	−5.3%
1930	987	−1.1%
1950	1,095	+10.9%
1961	1,167	+6.6%
1970	1,196	+2.5%
1980	1,193	−0.3%
1991	1,058	−11.3%
2001	1,090	+3.0%
2011	1,265	+16.1%
2021	1,546	+22.2%
Source: Censuses
