= Brno-Vinohrady =

- City District of Brno
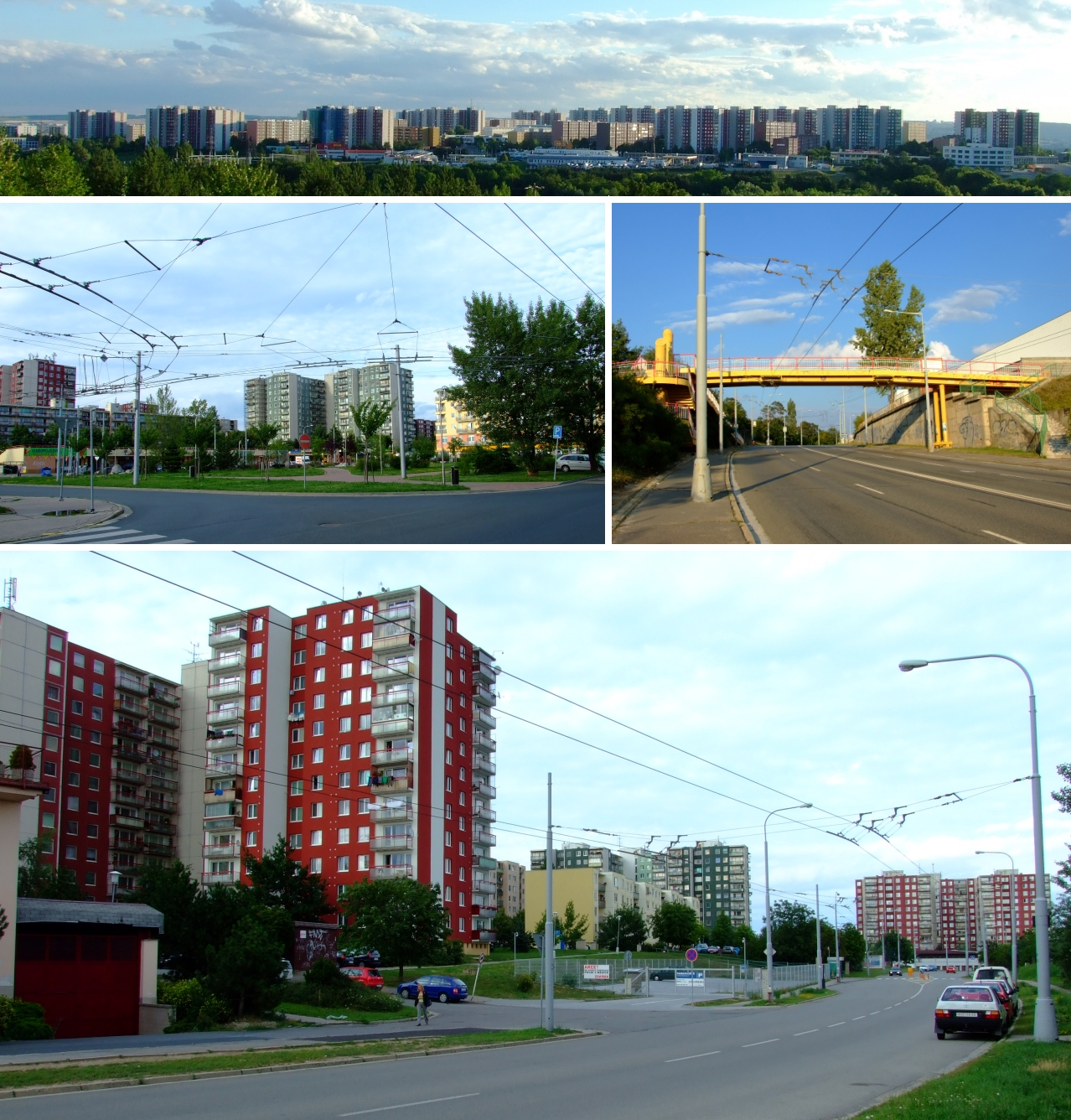
- Collage of Brno-Vinohrady

- Flag Coat of arms

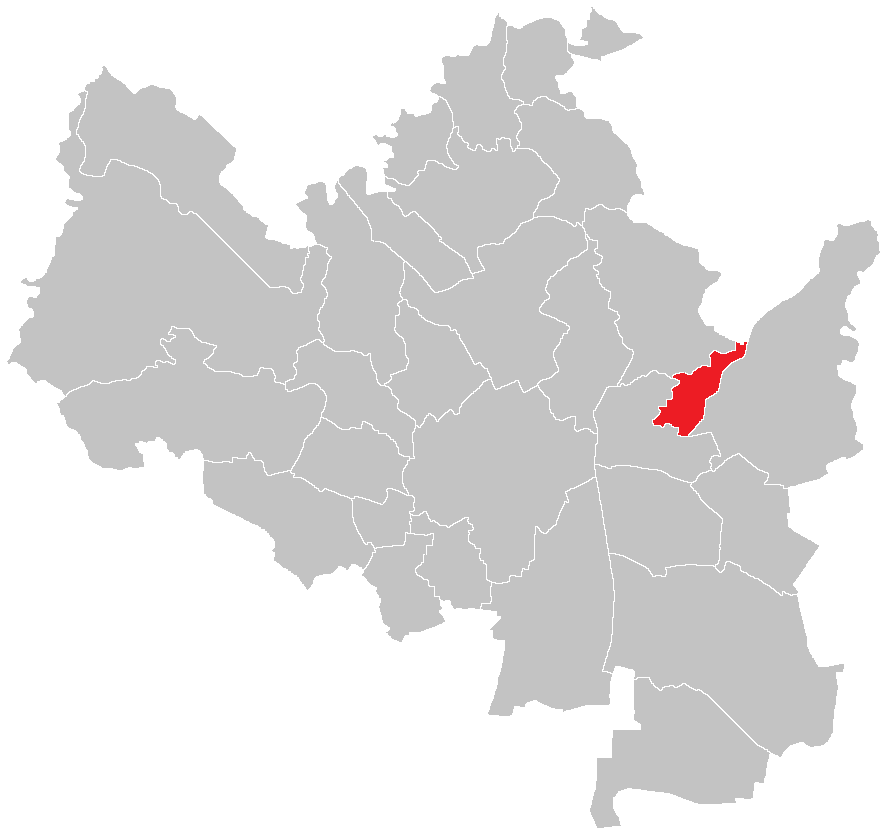
- Location of Brno-Vinohrady in Brno
- Coordinates: 49°12′21″N 16°39′30″E
- Country: Czech Republic
- Region: South Moravian
- District: Brno-City
- Municipality: Brno

Government
  - Mayor: Jitka Ivičičová (KDU-ČSL)

Area
  - Total: 1.96 km^{2} (0.76 sq mi)
- Elevation: 292 m (958 ft)

Population (2021)
  - Total: 12,172
  - Density: 6,210/km^{2} (16,100/sq mi)
- Time zone: UTC+1 (CET)
  - Summer (DST): UTC+2 (CEST)
- Postal code: 628 00
- Website: www.vinohrady.brno.cz

Brno-Vinohrady is a city district in the eastern part of Brno in the Czech Republic. It has about 12,000 inhabitants. The city district was established on 24 November 1990.

== Characteristic ==
The vast majority of Vinohrady is made up of about 50 coloured paneláks, which are visible from many parts of Brno. It is surrounded by Brno-Líšeň to the east and southeast, Brno-Židenice to the southwest, Brno-Maloměřice and Obřany to the northwest, and the village of Kanice to the north.

== History ==
Based on archaeological research, humans have been present in the area since around 500,000 years ago, during the Old Palaeolithic Period. The area was long without any development, and the southern slopes were used to grow vineyards.

The current-day territory of Vinohrady was made part of the city of Brno on 16 April 1919. In 1943, Germans established a branch of the factory Flugmotorenwerke Ostmark (predecessor of current-day Zetor). There was a colony of 20 wooden houses on the hill, which the inhabitants of Brno began to call Hamburg because the bulk of its inhabitants came from Hamburg. The colony was hit during the Allied bombing at the end of the World War II. After the liberation of Brno and the subsequent expulsion of Germans, the colony was left deserted for a couple of years before being reoccupied by survivors of the war, including those who had been in Nazi prisons and concentration camps.

The demise of Hamburg occurred in the 1980s in connection with the construction of the present-day housing estate. Residents protested the construction unsuccessfully, and the estate was completed in 1989.

== Demographics ==
Historical population
Year	Pop.	±%
1970	582	—
1980	416	−28.5%
1991	15,766	+3689.9%
2001	14,823	−6.0%
2011	13,361	−9.9%
2021	12,172	−8.9%
Source: Censuses
