= Museum of Biblical Art (New York City) =

Defunct museum in Manhattan, New York

Coordinates: 40.770243°N 73.982741°W

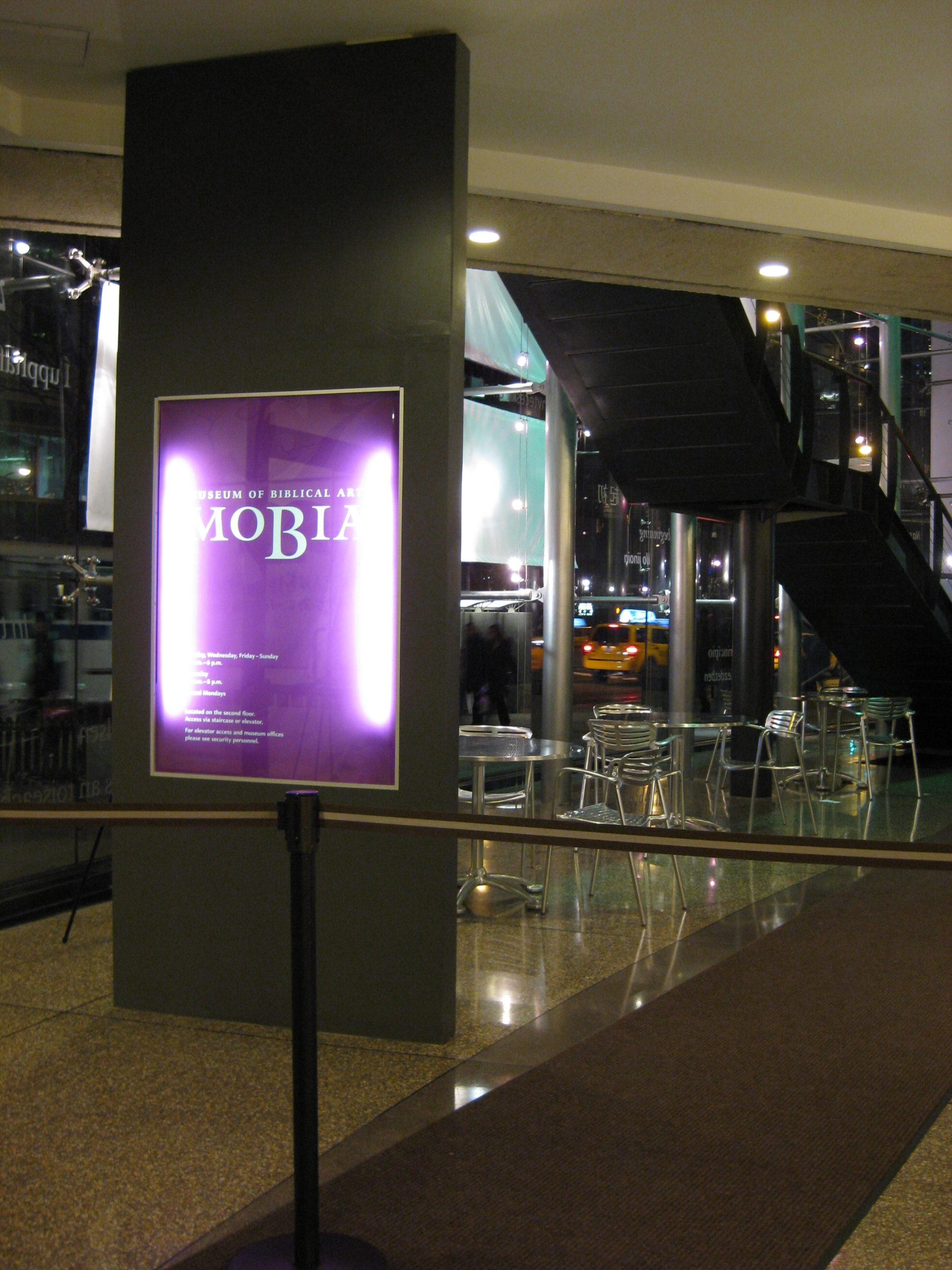
Lobby of the American Bible Society building

The Museum of Biblical Art (MOBIA) was a museum in Manhattan, New York City, that closed in 2015.

MOBIA was a non-collecting institution dedicated to exploration of the Bible's legacy in Jewish and Christian art. Started in 1997 as an art gallery at the American Bible Society building in New York City, the museum became an independent entity on May 12, 2005.

The museum aimed to become a nationally recognized center of expertise on art and the Bible, while maintaining a secular distance from its subject. Although it grew out of the American Bible Society and was subsidized by that organization, it was not a religious institution and took no stand on religion itself. Rather, MOBIA hoped to open dialogue on a subject it considered under-explored, the influence of religion on art, by providing exhibits and educational programs to visitors.

In April 2015, the museum announced it would be closing in June after failing to find a new space. The institution had been paying only $1 in rent on its space in the headquarters of the American Bible Society, but the latter's impending move to Philadelphia made the continuation of that arrangement impossible.

== Building ==
The Museum of Biblical Art was located on the second floor of the American Bible Society's headquarters building at the corner of Broadway and 61st Street, between Columbus Circle and Lincoln Center on the Upper West Side of Manhattan in New York. The main 2,500-square-foot (230 m^{2}) exhibition space was created after extensive renovation, and the museum also included an 1,100-square-foot (100 m^{2}) education center for lectures, concerts, and children's activities. Principal architects were Randall Goya and Sara Lopergolo, of G&L Architects of New York.

In 2015, due to the intention of the American Bible Society to sell their New York building and move to Philadelphia, MOBIA announced that it was seeking a new location, but the search was unsuccessful and the museum closed permanently on June 14, 2015.

== Exhibitions ==
The Museum of Biblical Art presented four exhibitions per year which highlight the changing relationship of faith — whether express, implied, or absent — to art.

MOBIA's first exhibition was "Coming Home!: Self-taught Artists, the Bible, and the American South", featuring ninety-five works by seventy-three artists. The exhibit explored the way the Bible, in the context of evangelical Christianity, has influenced the subject matter, meaning and function of art made by Southern self-taught artists.

Later exhibitions included "The Next Generation: Contemporary Expressions of Faith", which dealt with contemporary religious art and artists, in partnership with Christians in the Visual Arts, and "Let There Be Light: Oil Lamps from the Holy Land", exploring the uses of clay oil lamps through history, on loan from the Bible Lands Museum in Jerusalem.

Later, "On Eagles' Wings: The King James Bible Turns 400" explored the tumultuous origins and dramatic impact of a literary masterpiece widely considered one of the most celebrated books in the English-speaking world. The exhibition explored the historic context in which the King James Bible was translated and published, beginning with an examination of its predecessors, most notably the Bishops' Bible sponsored by Queen Elizabeth I in 1568 and singled out as the model that the translators commissioned by King James were to follow as closely as possible. The exhibition presented the touchstones of the translation process, examining how this work was and continues to be inspirational for various audiences over time.

"The Land of Light and Promise: 50 Years Painting Jerusalem and Beyond, Ludwig Blum (1891-1974)" showcased that artist. Known as the "Painter of Jerusalem," Ludwig Blum immigrated to Palestine in 1923 from what is now the Czech Republic. A veteran of the First World War and an academically trained painter, Blum set about depicting the Middle East, most notably the Holy Land, both through vast topographical scenes and through small-scale street and marketplace scenes. He portrayed Palestine, and later Israel, with an intimacy borne of his love for his adopted homeland and its people, and he painted Jewish, Christian, and Muslim sites alike, largely devoid of religious overtones.

Other exhibitions included "Walls Speak: The Narrative Art of Hildreth Meière", "Finding Comfort in Difficult Times: A Selection of Soldiers' Bibles" and "Louis C. Tiffany and the Art of Devotion".

For its final exhibit, the museum drew the largest crowds in its history for a show of 15th century sculpture by Donatello, Brunelleschi, Nanni di Banco, Luca della Robbia and others from the Florence Cathedral, pieces never before seen in the United States.

== See also ==
- List of museums and cultural institutions in New York City
