= Local committee (Czechoslovakia) =

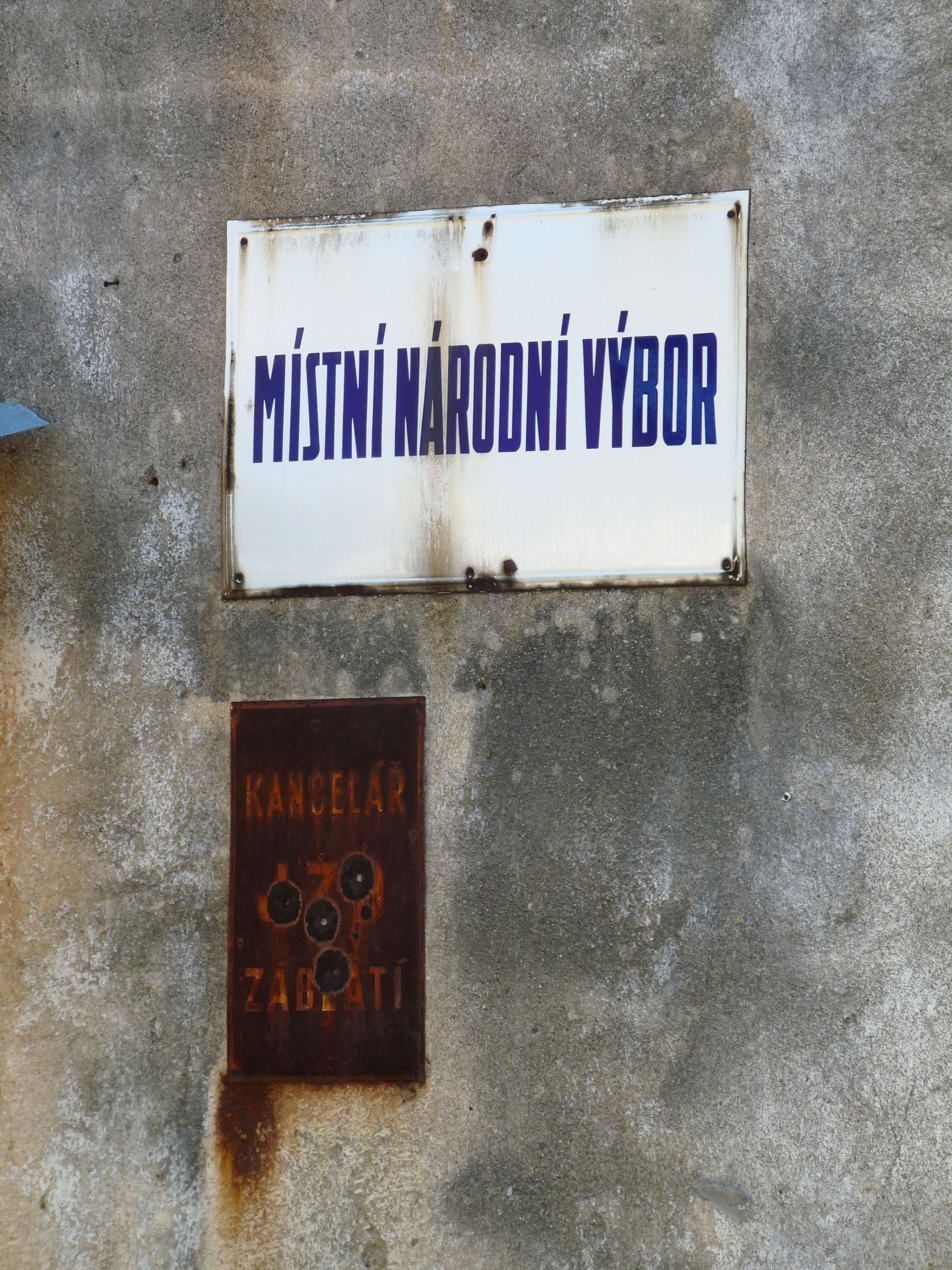
Sign identifying the local committee office in the village of Záblatí in 2013

Local committees (Czech: Místní národní výbor, abbreviated MNV, literally "local national committee") were the representatives of the central committee (Czech: Národní výbor, literally "national committee"), which administered municipalities in Czechoslovakia in the years 1945 to 1990.

== Origin ==
In 1945, the local committees were awarded jurisdiction over municipalities in the Czechoslovak Socialist Republic, replacing existing municipal councils. In addition to their existing agendas, they also dealt with post-war issues, such as:

- The confiscation of agricultural property of Germans, Hungarians, and Czech traitors (under decrees 12/1945 and 108/1945)
- Criminal offenses against the national honor (decree 138/1945)
- War reparations
- The Expulsion of Germans
- The appointment of the national administration
- The tallying and compensation of war damages

Interim implementation guidelines for state administration were published on 10 September 1947.

== Under Communist Party ==
Starting in February 1948, the apparatus of state government gradually came under the control of the Communist Party. An updated constitution was ratified on 9 May 1948. All levels of government intervened into the economy and social life. A new law on regional government (no. 280/1948) was adopted on 21 December 1948, which enacted a complete reorganization of the state administration. A new regulation (no. 14/1950) was issued on 28 February 1950 which specified the creation of local chapters of the national committee. These local committees were subordinate to regional committees. The legal system at the time did not recognize municipalities as independent governing entities, so the local committees were the 'de facto' lowest level of government. The local committees consisted of a plenum body and an administrative organ.

== Amalgamated districts of Prague ==
In those districts of Prague amalgamated into the capital region between 1968 and 1974, local committees continued to function, but were in fact subordinate to the Prague regional committee, while the original districts were governed directly by the regional committee.

== Transformation after communism ==
In 1990, after the Velvet Revolution, the local committees were transformed into municipal governments with local councils, except in Prague, where local government was divided at the district level.
