= Brno-Slatina =

- City District of Brno
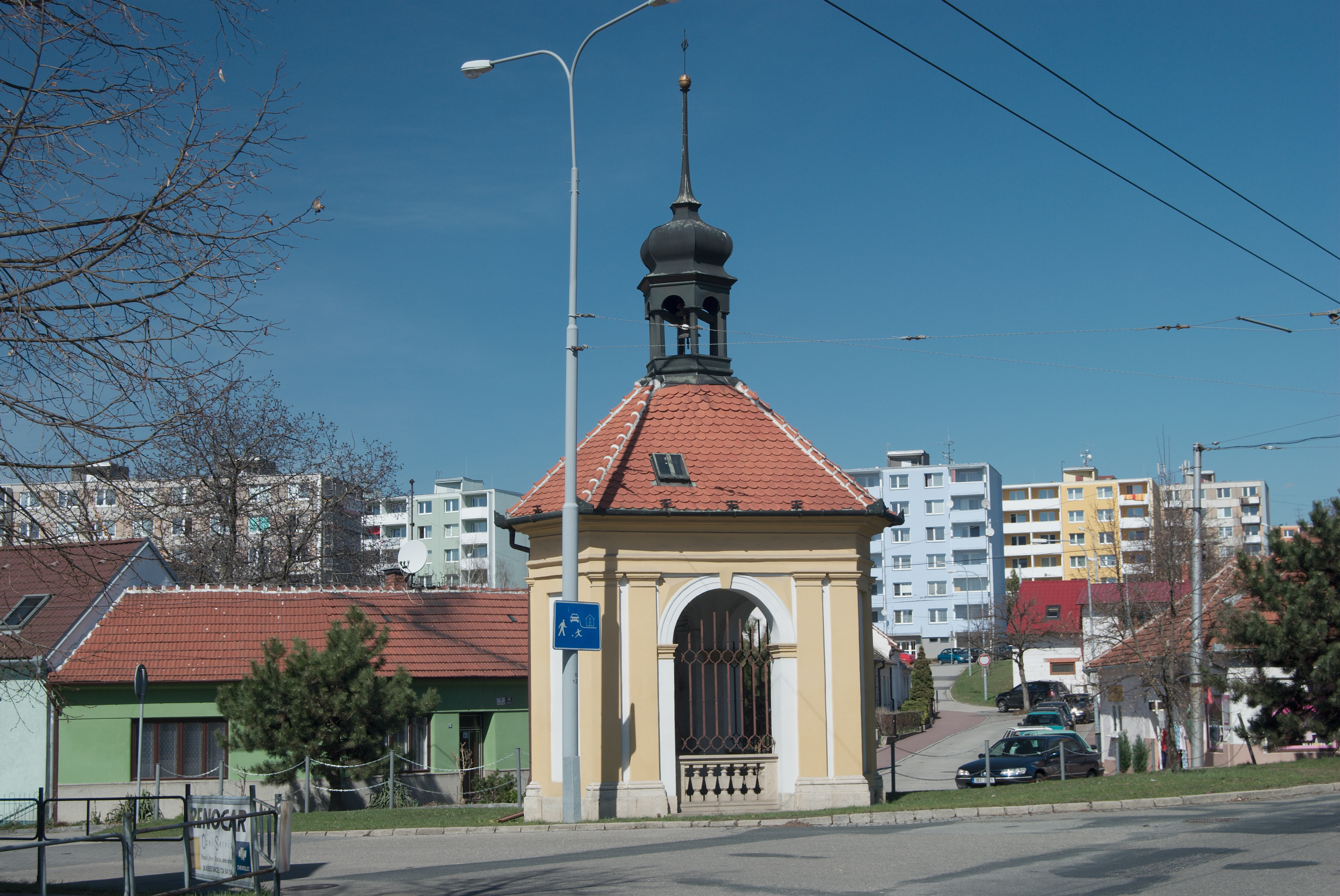
- Old and new buildings of Slatina

- Flag Coat of arms

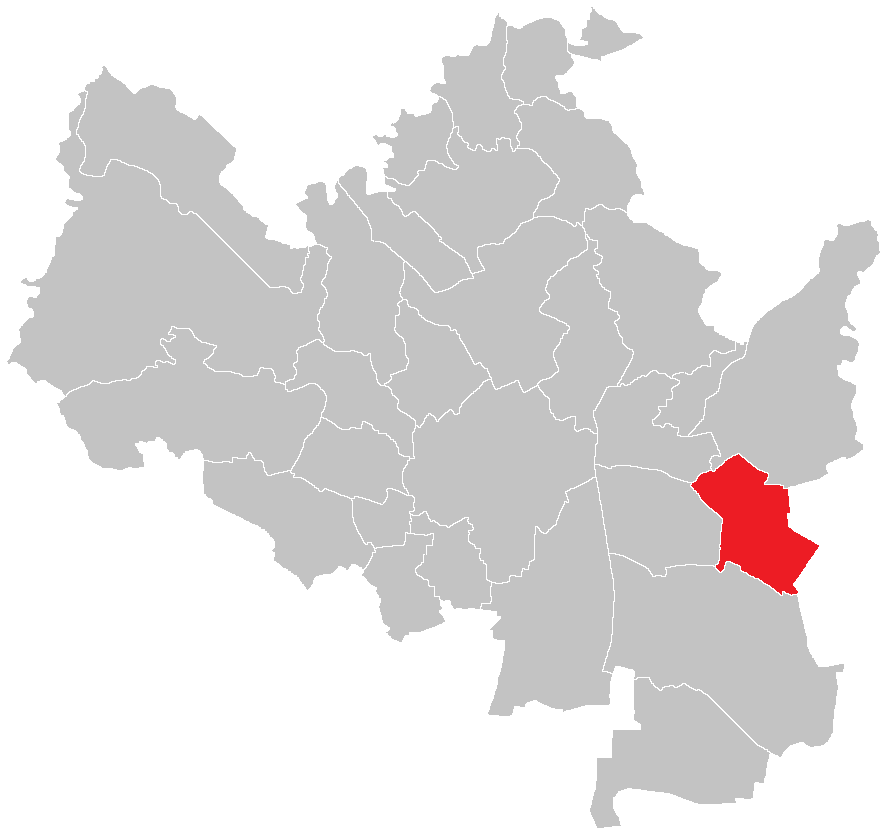
- Location of Slatina in Brno 49°10′42″N 16°41′05″E
- Country: Czech Republic
- Region: South Moravian Region
- City: Brno

Government
  - Mayor: Jiří Ides (ČSSD)

Area
  - Total: 5.83 km^{2} (2.25 sq mi)

Population (2023)
  - Total: 12,577
  - Density: 2,160/km^{2} (5,590/sq mi)
- Time zone: UTC+1 (CET)
  - Summer (DST): UTC+2 (CEST)
- Postal code: 627 00
- Website: https://www.mcslatina.cz/

Slatina is a city district of Brno, the second largest city in the Czech Republic. It is located in the eastern part of the city and is somewhat separated from other parts. Slatina became a part of Brno in 1919 and as of 2021, it has 11,104 inhabitants.

Slatina has a well-preserved centre. The south of the district contains mostly modern houses, while the north of the district contains many panel houses built in the 1980s. A large part of the district, most notably the south-west, is dedicated to industrial and office buildings.

== Territorial divisions ==
The cadastral territory of Slatina is further divided into 10 basic settlement units.

Basic settlement unit	Population		
Basic settlement unit	2011	2021	Change
Černovičky-Podstránská	567	520	-8.3%
Stránská skála	20	18	-10.0%
Přemyslovo náměstí	2,209	2,427	+9.9%
Tilhonova	1,939	1,831	-5.6%
Šlapanická trať	165	883	+435.2%
Tuřanka	442	499	+12.9%
Slatina-sídliště	3,823	3,431	-10.3%
Hviezdoslavova	195	209	+7.2%
Kigginsova	-	1,232	-
Slatinka	-	54	-

== Demographics ==
Historical population
Year	Pop.	±%
1869	680	—
1880	851	+25.1%
1890	1,046	+22.9%
1900	1,217	+16.3%
1910	1,470	+20.8%
1921	1,432	−2.6%
1930	1,728	+20.7%
1950	2,164	+25.2%
1961	3,256	+50.5%
1970	3,833	+17.7%
1980	4,714	+23.0%
1991	8,668	+83.9%
2001	8,530	−1.6%
2011	9,360	+9.7%
2021	11,104	+18.6%
Source: Censuses

== Economy ==
Slatina neighbours Černovická terasa, a commercial and industrial zone which houses offices of several international companies including Acer, Honeywell and Daikin.

== Transport ==
Slatina is served by two trolleybus lines and several bus lines, which connect the area to the city centre. The main Czech motorway, the D1, passes close by.
