= Slavkov u Brna (administrative district) =

Administrative district in the South Moravian Region, Czech Republic

Administrative district of the municipality with extended powers of Slavkov u Brna Správní obvod obce s rozšířenou působností Slavkov u Brna
- Administrative district of municipality with extended powers
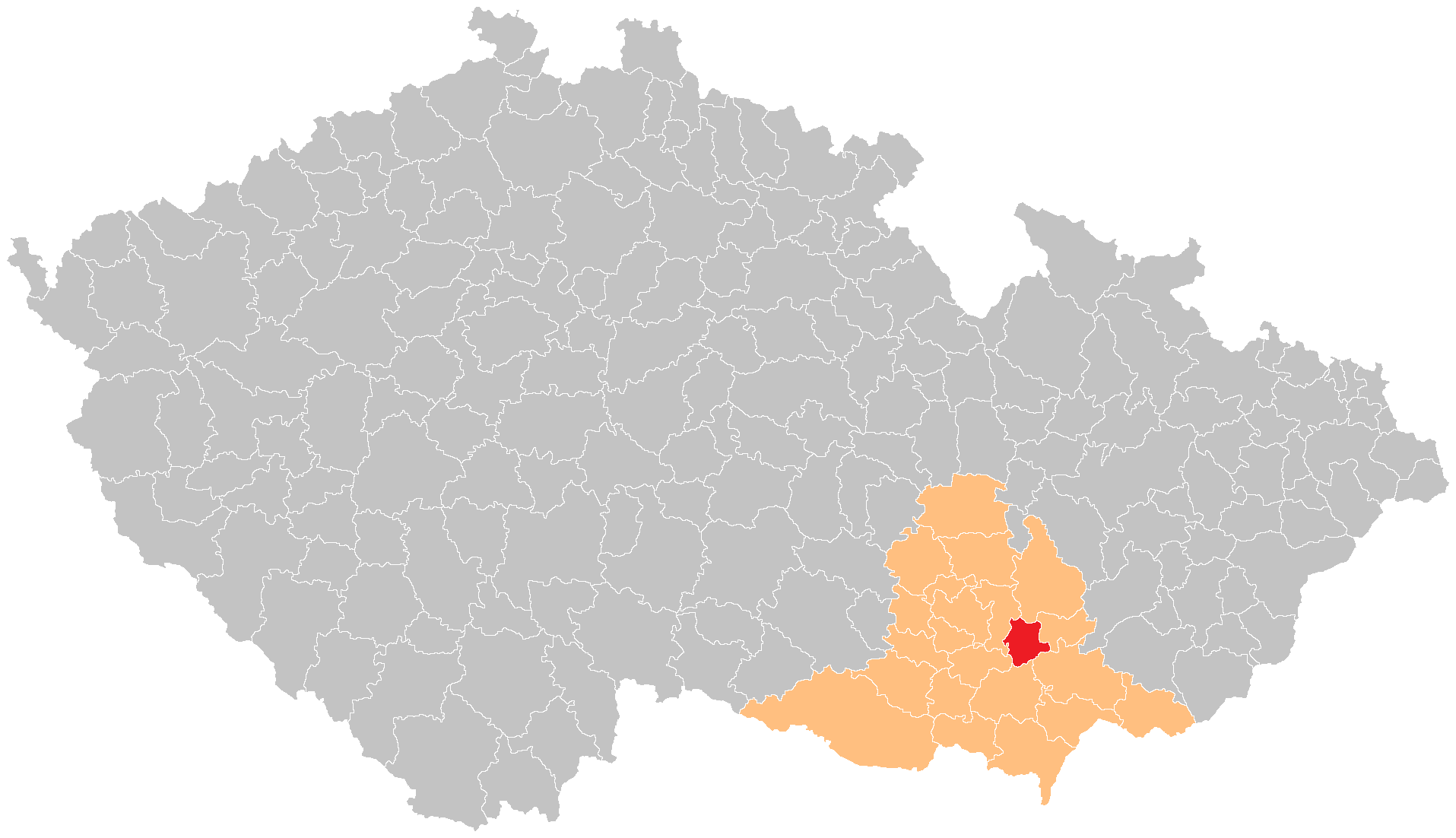
- Location in the South Moravian Region within the Czech Republic
- Coordinates: 49°6′N 16°51′E
- Country: Czech Republic
- Region: South Moravian
- District: Vyškov
- Municipality with extended powers: Slavkov u Brna

Area
  - Total: 157.7 km^{2} (60.9 sq mi)

Population (2024)
  - Total: 25,060
  - Density: 158.9/km^{2} (411.6/sq mi)
- Time zone: UTC+1 (CET)
  - Summer (DST): UTC+2 (CEST)
- Municipalities: 18
- * Cities and towns: 1
- * Market towns: 0

The administrative district of the municipality with extended powers of Slavkov u Brna (abbreviated AD MEP Slavkov u Brna; Czech: Správní obvod obce s rozšířenou působností Slavkov u Brna, SO ORP Slavkov u Brna) is an administrative district of municipality with extended powers in Vyškov District in the South Moravian Region of the Czech Republic. It has existed since 1 January 2003, when the districts were replaced administratively. It includes 18 municipalities which have a combined population of about 25,000.

== Municipalities ==
Cities and towns are in bold.

Municipality	Population	Area (km^{2)}	Density
Bošovice	1,259	12.88	98
Heršpice	920	18.05	51
Hodějice	1,105	8.58	128
Holubice	1,766	7.39	239
Hostěrádky-Rešov	834	4.67	178
Hrušky	756	5.47	138
Kobeřice u Brna	715	16.74	43
Křenovice	2,057	8.85	232
Lovčičky	738	4.04	182
Milešovice	711	6.71	106
Němčany	827	7.00	118
Nížkovice	789	7.03	112
Otnice	1,591	8.70	182
Slavkov u Brna	7,169	14.95	479
Šaratice	1,065	8.25	129
Vážany nad Litavou	759	7.02	108
Velešovice	1,269	6.59	192
Zbýšov	730	4.79	152

== Demographics ==
Historical population

Year	Pop.	±%
1869	14,934	—
1880	16,501	+10.5%
1890	17,657	+7.0%
1900	18,348	+3.9%
1910	20,425	+11.3%

Year	Pop.	±%
1921	21,192	+3.8%
1930	22,815	+7.7%
1950	21,132	−7.4%
1961	22,185	+5.0%
1970	21,256	−4.2%

Year	Pop.	±%
1980	20,743	−2.4%
1991	19,784	−4.6%
2001	19,775	−0.0%
2011	21,658	+9.5%
2021	24,199	+11.7%

Source: Censuses
