= Litava (river) =

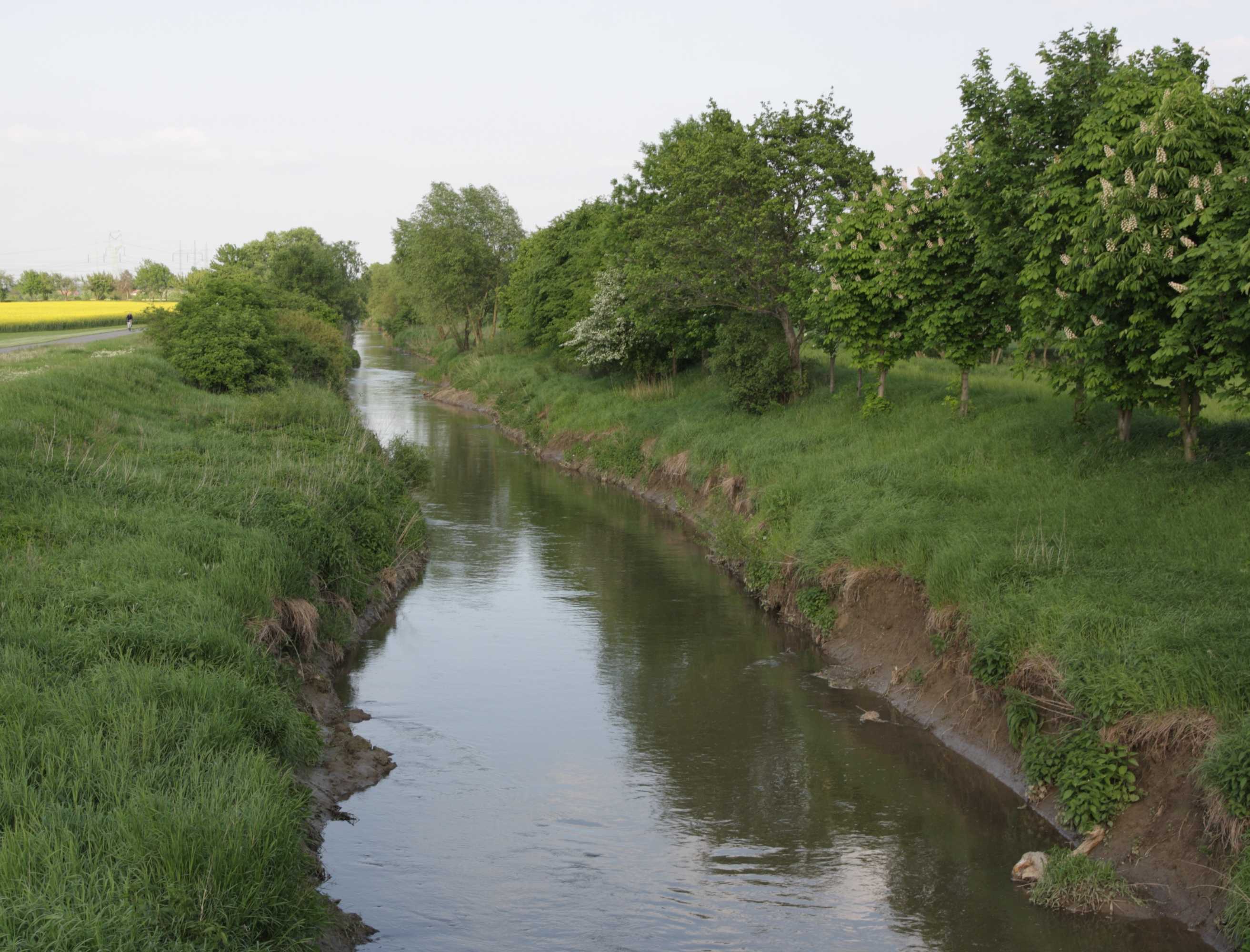
- The Litava in Žatčany

Location
- Country: Czech Republic
- Regions: South Moravian; Zlín

Physical characteristics
- Source
  - location: Chvalnov-Lísky, Chřiby
  - coordinates: 49°9′28″N 17°16′54″E
  - elevation: 511 m (1,677 ft)
- Mouth
  - location: Svratka
  - coordinates: 49°2′25″N 16°36′55″E
  - elevation: 179 m (587 ft)
- Length: 58.6 km (36.4 mi)
- Basin size: 788.4 km^{2} (304.4 sq mi)
- Discharge
  - average: 1.64 m^{3}/s (58 cu ft/s) near estuary

Basin features
- Progression: Svratka→ Thaya→ Morava→ Danube→ Black Sea

The Litava (Czech pronunciation: [ˈlɪtava]; also known as Cézava) is a river in the Czech Republic, a left tributary of the Svratka River. It flows through the South Moravian and Zlín regions. It is 58.6 km (36.4 mi) long.

== Etymology ==
The name is derived from the Czech word lítá (meaning 'fierce', 'wild'), referring to the character of the river.

== Characteristic ==
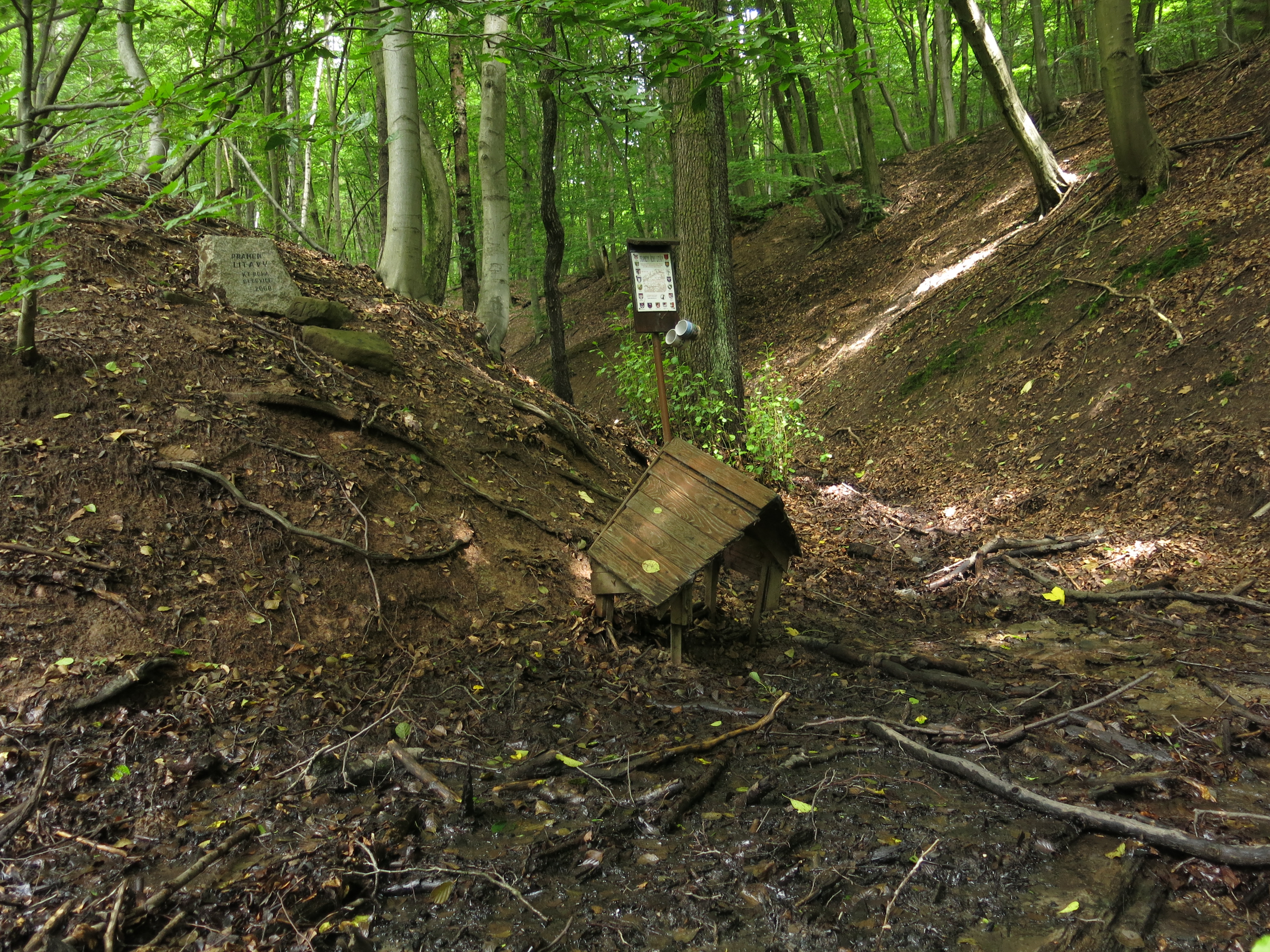
Spring of the Litava

The Litava originates in the territory of Chvalnov-Lísky in the Chřiby range at an elevation of 495 m (1,624 ft) and flows to Židlochovice, where it enters the Svratka River at an elevation of 179 m (587 ft). It is 58.6 km (36.4 mi) long. Its drainage basin has an area of 788.4 km^{2} (304.4 sq mi). The average discharge at its mouth is 1.64 m^{3}/s (58 cu ft/s).

The longest tributaries of the Litava are:

| Tributary | Length (km) | River km | Side |
|---|---|---|---|
| Říčka | 38.9 | 7.2 | right |
| Rakovec | 37.1 | 20.4 | right |
| Dunávka | 15.2 | 2.4 | right |
| Hvězdlička | 12.5 | 41.6 | right |
| Moutnický potok | 12.3 | 5.6 | left |
| Milešovický potok | 11.9 | 16.2 | left |
| Žlebový potok | 9.7 | 32.0 | right |

== Course ==
The most populated settlement on the river is the town of Slavkov u Brna. The river flows through the municipal territories of Chvalnov-Lísky, Zástřizly, Kožušice, Malínky, Brankovice, Nesovice, Nevojice, Bučovice, Křižanovice, Hodějice, Slavkov u Brna, Vážany nad Litavou, Hrušky, Zbýšov, Šaratice, Hostěrádky-Rešov, Újezd u Brna, Žatčany, Měnín, Blučina and Židlochovice.

== Bodies of water ==
There are 231 bodies of water in the basin area. The largest of them is the fishpond Těšany with an area of 17.1 ha (42 acres), built on the brook Borkovanský potok. The Litava supplies several fishponds, but there are no fishponds and reservoirs built directly on the river.

== See also ==
- List of rivers of the Czech Republic
