= Újezd u Brna =

- Town
- Rectory and Church of Saints Peter and Paul

- Flag Coat of arms

- Location in the Czech Republic
- Coordinates: 49°6′16″N 16°45′27″E
- Country: Czech Republic
- Region: South Moravian
- District: Brno-Country
- First mentioned: 1141

Government
  - Mayor: Marie Kozáková

Area
  - Total: 13.07 km^{2} (5.05 sq mi)
- Elevation: 195 m (640 ft)

Population (2026-01-01)
  - Total: 3,422
  - Density: 261.8/km^{2} (678.1/sq mi)
- Time zone: UTC+1 (CET)
  - Summer (DST): UTC+2 (CEST)
- Postal code: 664 53
- Website: ujezdubrna.cz

Újezd u Brna (Czech pronunciation: [ˈuːjɛst ˈu br̩na]; German: Aujest) is a town in Brno-Country District in the South Moravian Region of the Czech Republic. It has about 3,400 inhabitants. The town is located on the Litava River in the Dyje–Svratka Valley.

Újezd u Brna was founded in the first half of the 12th century at the latest, but it became a town only in 2005.

== Geography ==
Újezd u Brna is located about 13 kilometres (8 mi) southeast of Brno. It lies in an agricultural landscape in the Dyje–Svratka Valley. The Litava River flows through the town.

== History ==
The first written mention of Újezd (under the name Újezdec) is in a deed of Jindřich Zdík from 1141.

Újezd was part of the battlefield of the Battle of Austerlitz on 2 December 1805.

In 1909, Újezd was promoted to a market town. In 1952, Újezd merged with the neighbouring villages of Rychmanov and Šternov and was renamed Újezd u Brna. In 2005, Újezd u Brna became a town.

== Demographics ==
Historical population

Year	Pop.	±%
1869	1,514	—
1880	1,619	+6.9%
1890	1,829	+13.0%
1900	1,987	+8.6%
1910	2,254	+13.4%

Year	Pop.	±%
1921	2,538	+12.6%
1930	2,875	+13.3%
1950	2,835	−1.4%
1961	3,103	+9.5%
1970	2,948	−5.0%

Year	Pop.	±%
1980	2,666	−9.6%
1991	2,539	−4.8%
2001	2,765	+8.9%
2011	3,190	+15.4%
2021	3,288	+3.1%

Source: Censuses

== Transport ==
Újezd u Brna is located on the railway line heading from Křenovice to Skalice nad Svitavou via Brno.

== Sights ==
The main landmark of Újezd u Brna is the Church of Saints Peter and Paul. It was built in the Neoclassical style in 1845–1846.

== Notable people ==
- Jaroslav Konečný (1945–2017), handball player; lived and died here
