= Sokolnice =

- Municipality
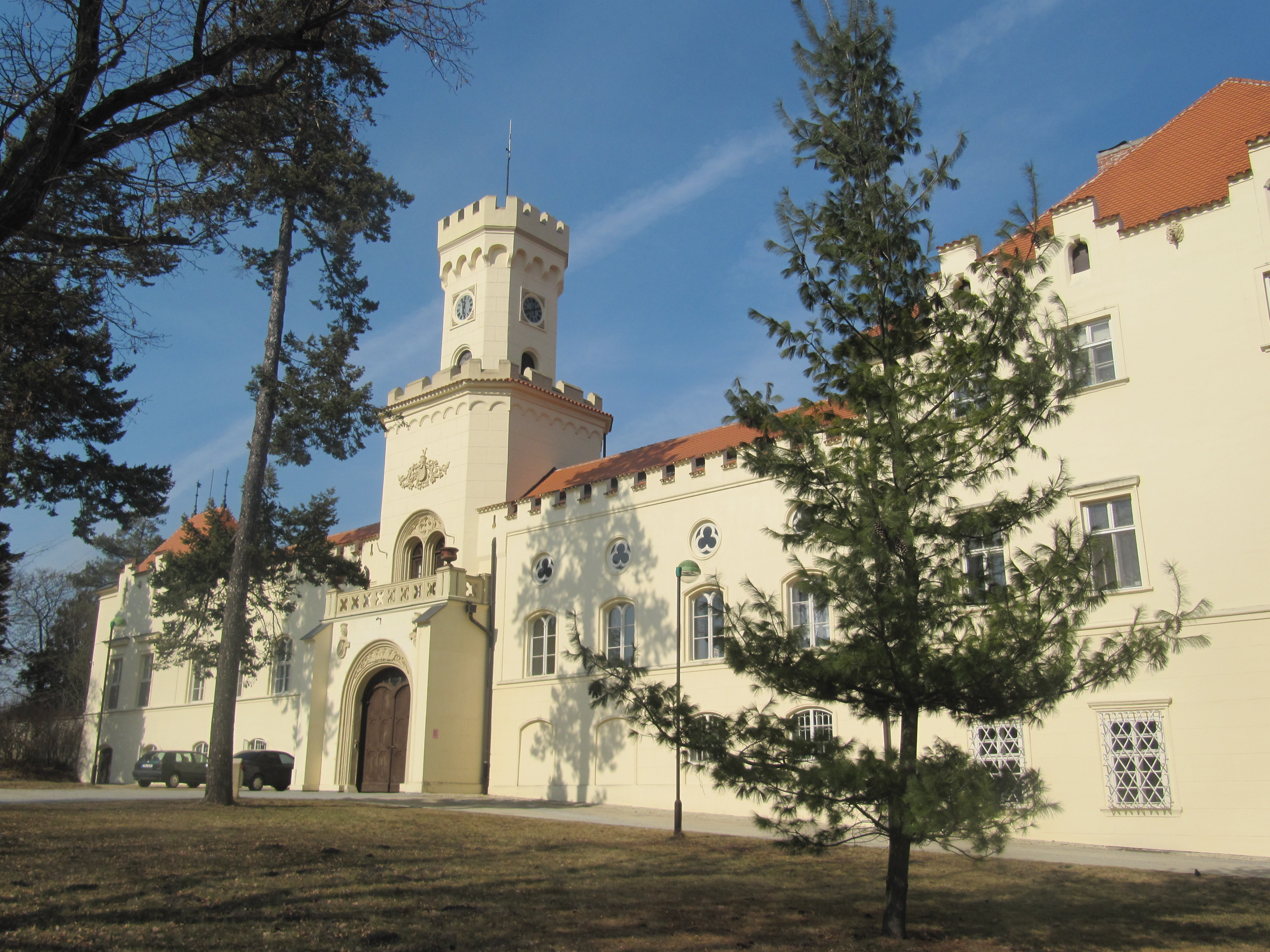
- Sokolnice Castle

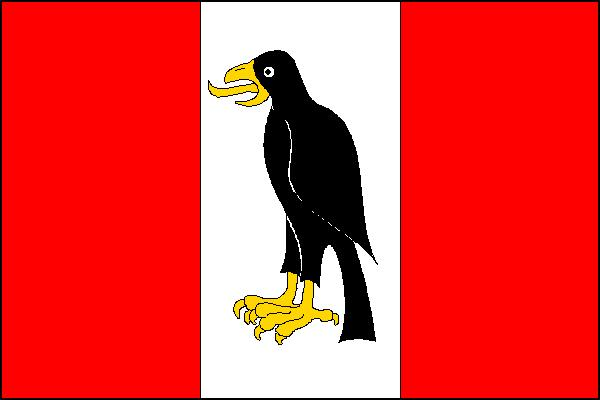
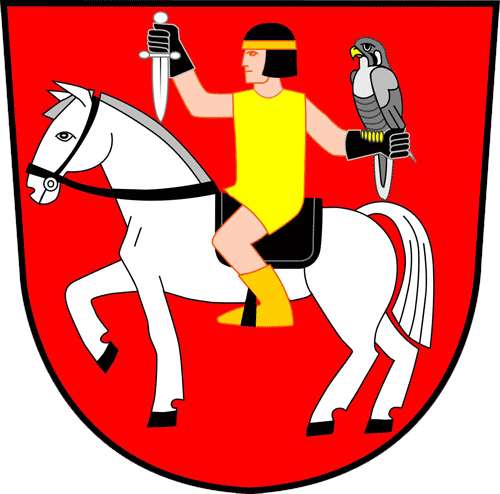
- Flag Coat of arms

- Location in the Czech Republic
- Coordinates: 49°6′50″N 16°43′18″E
- Country: Czech Republic
- Region: South Moravian
- District: Brno-Country
- First mentioned: 1408

Area
  - Total: 11.35 km^{2} (4.38 sq mi)
- Elevation: 207 m (679 ft)

Population (2026-01-01)
  - Total: 2,515
  - Density: 221.6/km^{2} (573.9/sq mi)
- Time zone: UTC+1 (CET)
  - Summer (DST): UTC+2 (CEST)
- Postal code: 664 52
- Website: www.sokolnice.cz

Sokolnice (German: Sokolnitz) is a municipality and village in Brno-Country District in the South Moravian Region of the Czech Republic. It has about 2,500 inhabitants.

== Geography ==
Sokolnice is located about 11 kilometres (7 mi) southeast of Brno. It lies in the Dyje–Svratka Valley. The highest point is at 308 m (1,010 ft) above sea level. The Říčka River flows through the village. The Dunávka Stream flows through the western part of the municipality and supplies Balaton Pond.

== History ==
The first written mention of Sokolnice is from 1408. Until the end of the 15th century, the village was owned by the monastery in Třebíč and passed on to various lesser nobles. Even in the following centuries, Sokolnice often changed owners. The village was badly damaged during the Thirty Years' War. From 1705 to 1875, Sokolnice was a property of the Dietrichstein family.

== Demographics ==
Historical population

Year	Pop.	±%
1869	1,007	—
1880	1,201	+19.3%
1890	1,363	+13.5%
1900	1,355	−0.6%
1910	1,476	+8.9%

Year	Pop.	±%
1921	1,573	+6.6%
1930	1,792	+13.9%
1950	1,725	−3.7%
1961	1,927	+11.7%
1970	1,841	−4.5%

Year	Pop.	±%
1980	1,758	−4.5%
1991	1,701	−3.2%
2001	1,748	+2.8%
2011	2,283	+30.6%
2021	2,417	+5.9%

Source: Censuses

== Transport ==
The municipality is served by the Sokolnice-Telnice train station, located on the railway line heading from Křenovice to Skalice nad Svitavou via Brno. The station is situated just outside the municipal territory.

== Sights ==
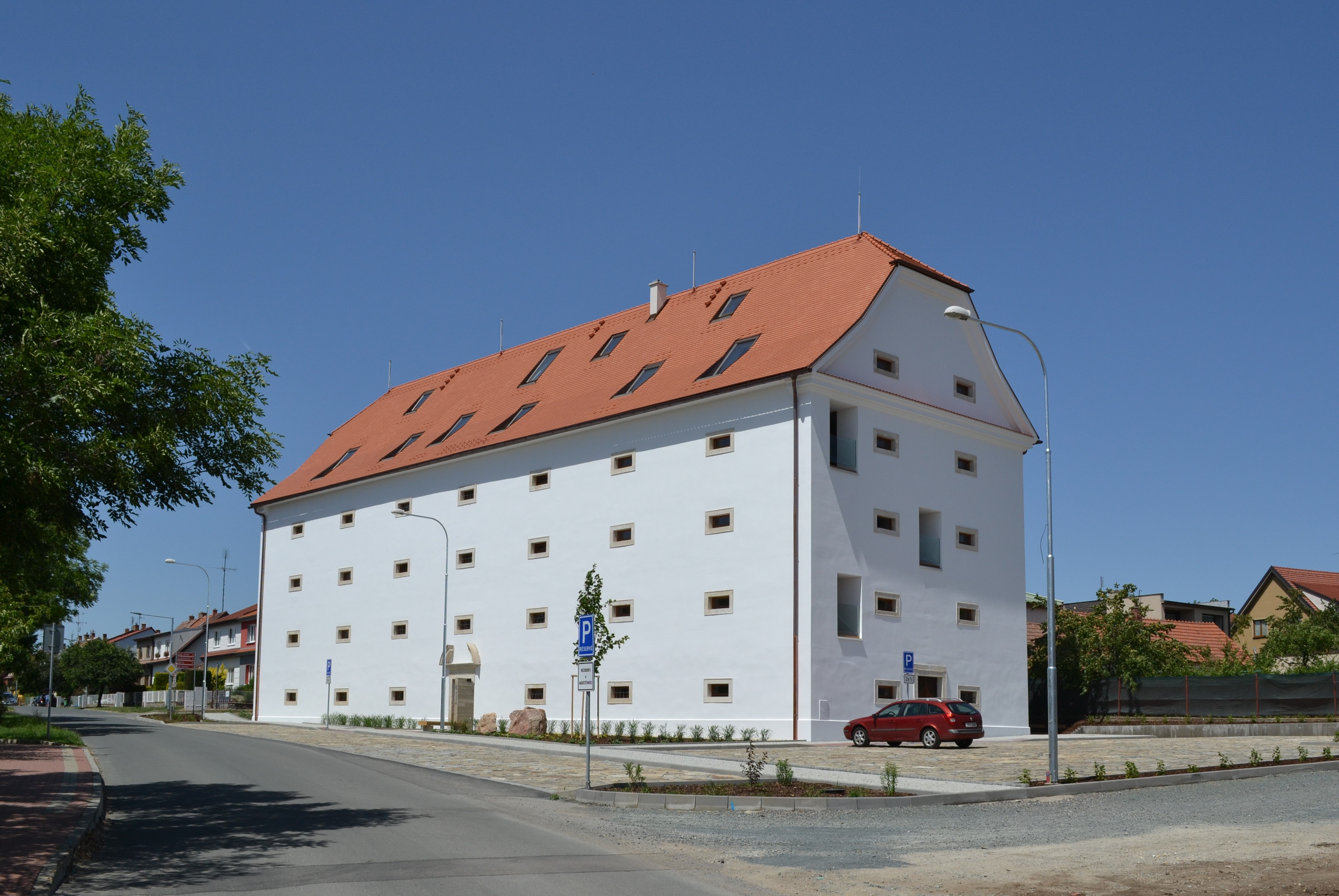
Former granary

The main landmark of Sokolnice is the Sokolnice Castle. It was built on the site of an older fortress. It was originally built in the Baroque style and later rebuilt in the Historicist style. Today it houses a retirement home. A part of the castle is a valuable early Baroque chapel. The castle is surrounded by a freely accessible park.

A cultural monument is the former granary. It is a large Baroque building from the first quarter of the 18th century. Today it is converted into a modern apartment building.
