= Hostěrádky-Rešov =

- Municipality
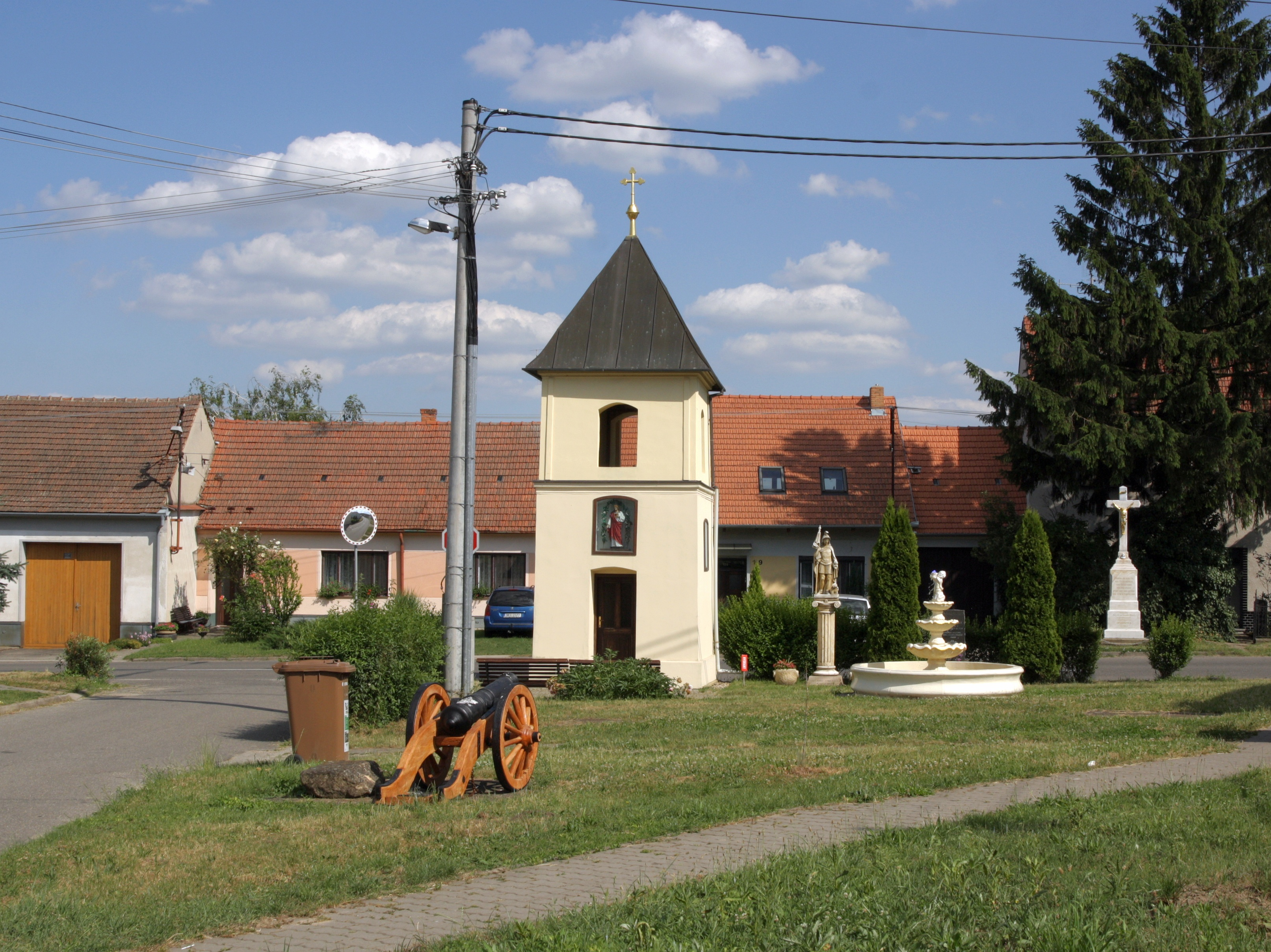
- Centre of Hostěrádky-Rešov

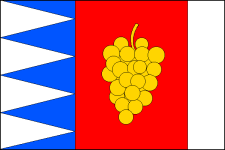
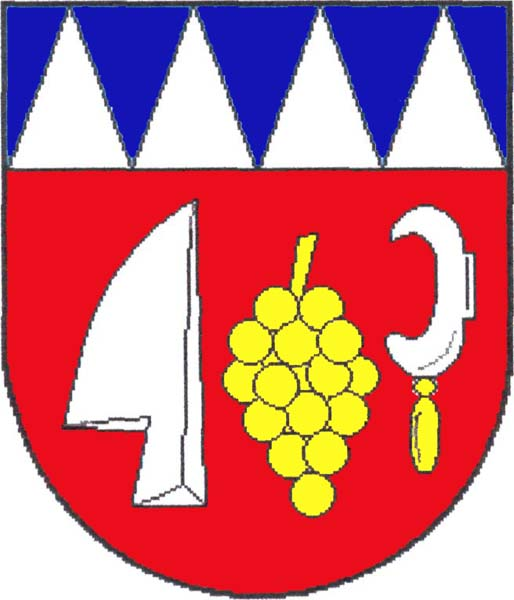
- Flag Coat of arms

- Location in the Czech Republic
- Coordinates: 49°7′4″N 16°47′4″E
- Country: Czech Republic
- Region: South Moravian
- District: Vyškov
- First mentioned: 1270

Area
  - Total: 4.67 km^{2} (1.80 sq mi)
- Elevation: 206 m (676 ft)

Population (2026-01-01)
  - Total: 828
  - Density: 177/km^{2} (459/sq mi)
- Time zone: UTC+1 (CET)
  - Summer (DST): UTC+2 (CEST)
- Postal code: 683 52
- Website: www.hosteradky-resov.cz

Hostěrádky-Rešov is a municipality and village in Vyškov District in the South Moravian Region of the Czech Republic. It has about 800 inhabitants.

== Etymology ==
The name Hostěrádky was probably derived from the personal name Hostirad. The village of Rešov was named after its administrator, who was called Resche.

== Geography ==
Hostěrádky-Rešov is located about 23 kilometres (14 mi) southwest of Vyškov and 14 km (9 mi) southeast of Brno. It lies in an agricultural landscape in the Dyje–Svratka Valley. The highest point is at 310 m (1,017 ft) above sea level. The Litava River flows along the southeastern municipal border.

== History ==
The first written mention about Hostěrádky is from 1270. Rešov was founded in 1787. The two formerly separate villages are urbanistically merged since 1826. They were administratively merged in 1913.

== Demographics ==
Historical population

Year	Pop.	±%
1869	508	—
1880	608	+19.7%
1890	676	+11.2%
1900	706	+4.4%
1910	725	+2.7%

Year	Pop.	±%
1921	727	+0.3%
1930	803	+10.5%
1950	832	+3.6%
1961	831	−0.1%
1970	808	−2.8%

Year	Pop.	±%
1980	764	−5.4%
1991	738	−3.4%
2001	733	−0.7%
2011	813	+10.9%
2021	828	+1.8%

Source: Censuses

== Transport ==
Hostěrádky-Rešov is located on the railway line Křenovice–Skalice nad Svitavou via Brno.

== Sights ==
The only protected cultural monument in the municipality is a late Baroque column shrine from the end of the 18th century.
