= Zbýšov (disambiguation) =

Zbýšov is a town in the South Moravian Region of the Czech Republic.

Zbýšov may also refer to places in the Czech Republic:

- Zbýšov (Kutná Hora District), a municipality and village in the Central Bohemian Region
- Zbýšov (Vyškov District), a municipality and village in the South Moravian Region
