= Hodějice =

- Municipality
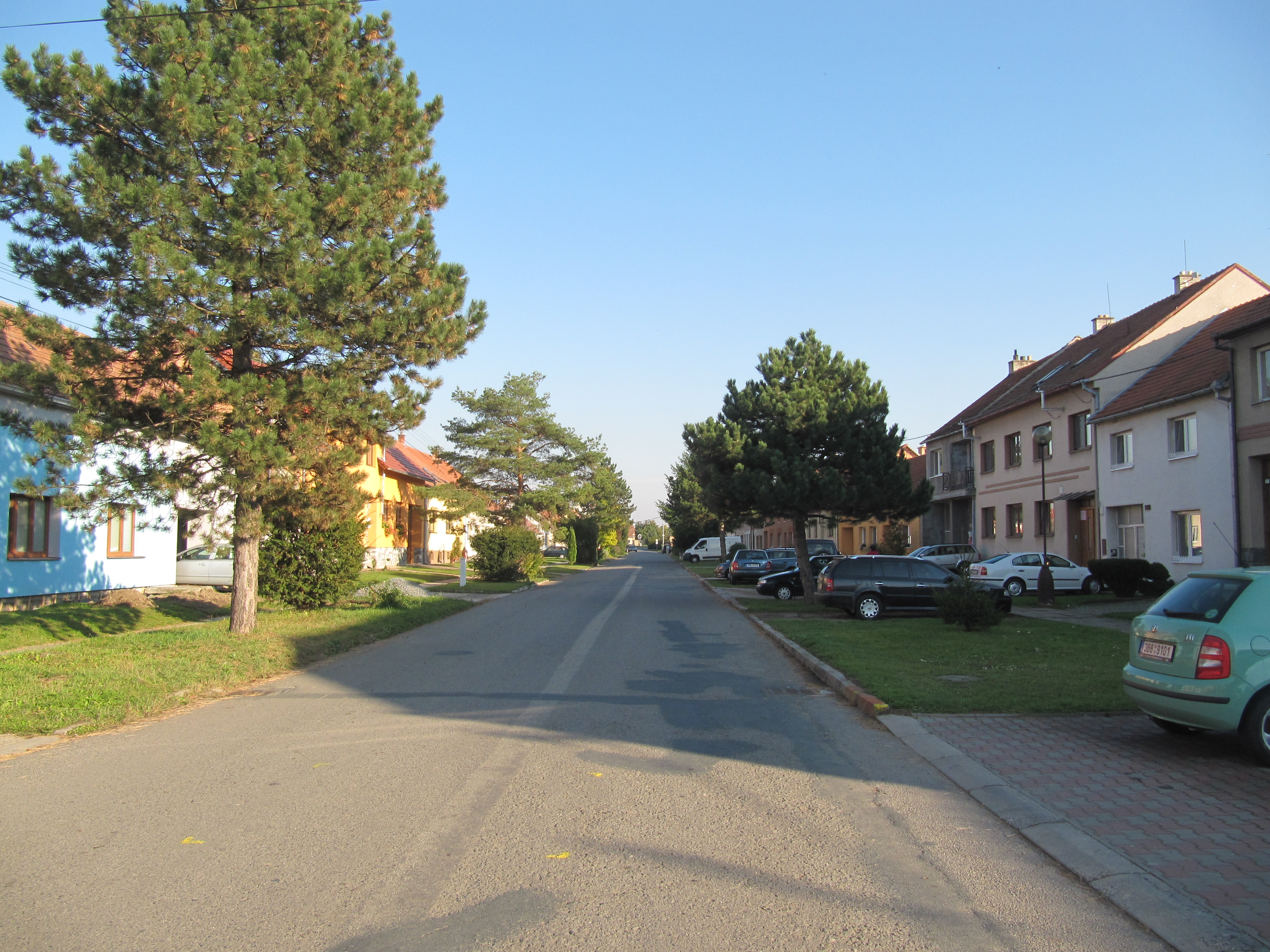
- Main street of Hodějice

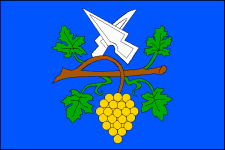
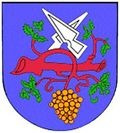
- Flag Coat of arms

- Location in the Czech Republic
- Coordinates: 49°8′29″N 16°54′49″E
- Country: Czech Republic
- Region: South Moravian
- District: Vyškov
- First mentioned: 1383

Area
  - Total: 8.58 km^{2} (3.31 sq mi)
- Elevation: 223 m (732 ft)

Population (2026-01-01)
  - Total: 1,135
  - Density: 132/km^{2} (343/sq mi)
- Time zone: UTC+1 (CET)
  - Summer (DST): UTC+2 (CEST)
- Postal code: 684 01
- Website: www.hodejice.cz

Hodějice is a municipality and village in Vyškov District in the South Moravian Region of the Czech Republic. It has about 1,100 inhabitants.

== Etymology ==
The name is derived from the personal name Hoděj, meaning "Hoděj's (court)".

== Geography ==
Hodějice is located about 16 kilometres (10 mi) south of Vyškov and 21 km (13 mi) east of Brno. The southern part of the municipal territory with the built-up area lies in the Ždánice Forest. The northern part lies in the Litenčice Hills. The highest point is the hill Vinohrad at 336 m (1,102 ft) above sea level. Hodějice is situated in an agricultural landscape. The Litava River flows through the municipality.

== History ==
The first written mention of Hodějice is in the account book of the Teutonic Knights order from 1383. Among the owners of the village were the Teutonic Knights, various lesser nobles and the Kaunitz family.

== Demographics ==
Historical population

Year	Pop.	±%
1869	809	—
1880	898	+11.0%
1890	985	+9.7%
1900	1,074	+9.0%
1910	1,187	+10.5%

Year	Pop.	±%
1921	1,234	+4.0%
1930	1,224	−0.8%
1950	1,110	−9.3%
1961	1,140	+2.7%
1970	1,082	−5.1%

Year	Pop.	±%
1980	957	−11.6%
1991	822	−14.1%
2001	811	−1.3%
2011	908	+12.0%
2021	1,044	+15.0%

Source: Censuses

== Transport ==
The I/50 road (part of the European route E50) from Brno to Uherské Hradiště runs through the municipality.

The railway line from Brno to Uherské Hradiště runs through the municipality, but there is no train stop. Hodějice is served by the train stop in neighbouring Křižanovice.

== Sights ==
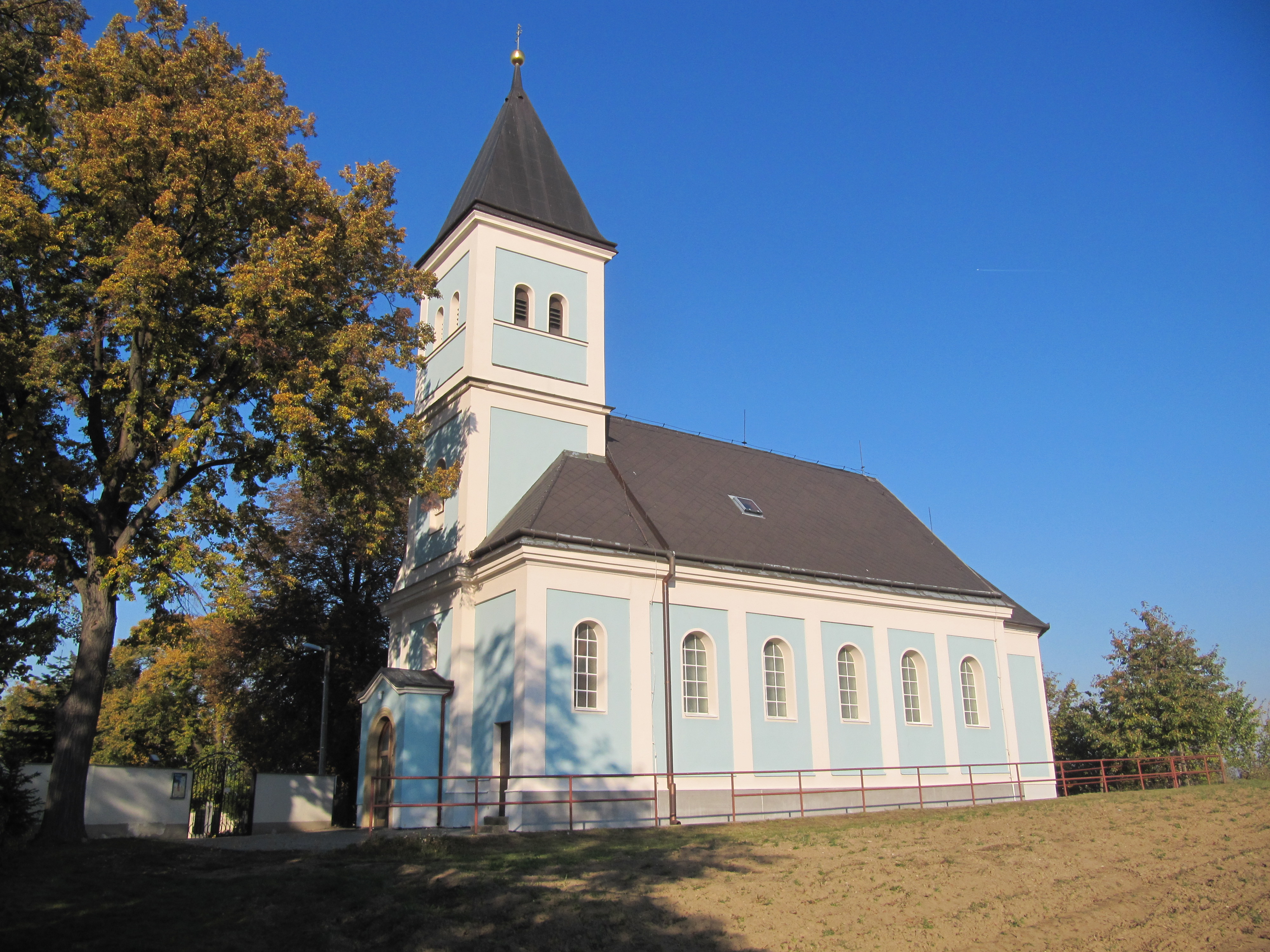
Church of Saint Bartholomew

There are no protected cultural monuments in the municipality. The main landmark is the Church of Saint Bartholomew. It was built in 1882–1884.
