= Brankovice =

- Market town
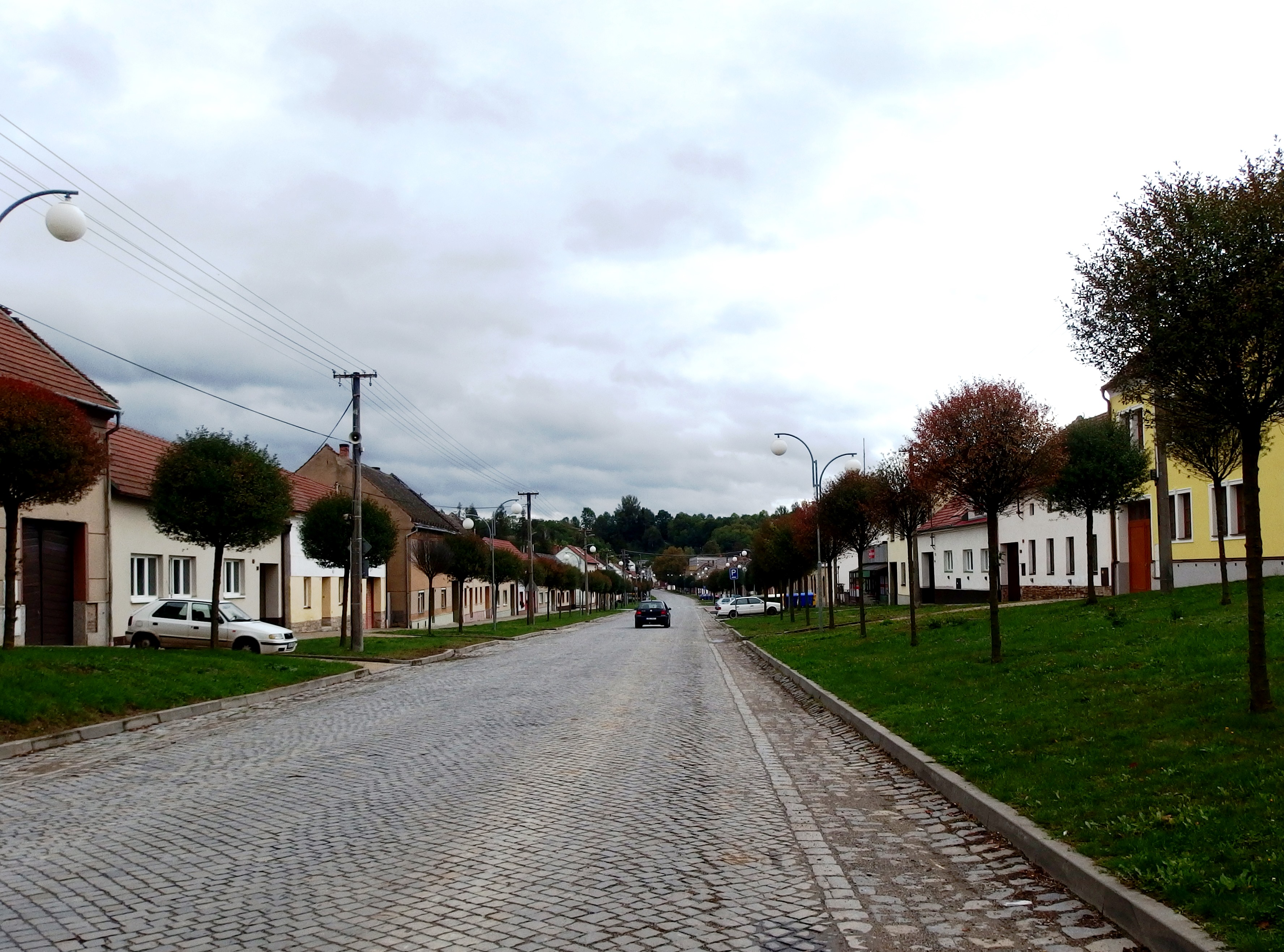
- Centre of Brankovice

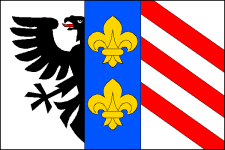
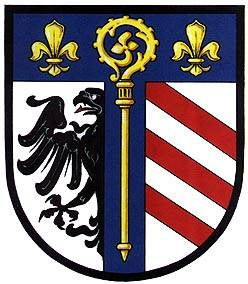
- Flag Coat of arms

- Location in the Czech Republic
- Coordinates: 49°9′22″N 17°8′5″E
- Country: Czech Republic
- Region: South Moravian
- District: Vyškov
- First mentioned: 1348

Area
  - Total: 12.15 km^{2} (4.69 sq mi)
- Elevation: 248 m (814 ft)

Population (2026-01-01)
  - Total: 904
  - Density: 74.4/km^{2} (193/sq mi)
- Time zone: UTC+1 (CET)
  - Summer (DST): UTC+2 (CEST)
- Postal code: 683 32
- Website: brankovice.eu

Brankovice (Czech pronunciation: [ˈbraŋkovɪtsɛ]; German: Brankowitz) is a market town in Vyškov District in the South Moravian Region of the Czech Republic. It has about 900 inhabitants.

== Etymology ==
The name is derived from the personal name Branek, meaning "the village of Branek's people".

== Geography ==
Brankovice is located about 17 kilometres (11 mi) southeast of Vyškov and 36 km (22 mi) east of Brno. It lies in the Litenčice Hills. The highest point is at 364 m (1,194 ft) above sea level. The Litava River flows through the market town.

== History ==
The first written mention of Brankovice is from 1348. In the following decades, the village was owned by various lower noblemen. In 1511, it was annexed to the Bučovice estate. From 1597, the Bučovice estate was owned by the Liechtenstein family. During the Thirty Years' War, Brankovice was badly damaged and the population decreased.

== Demographics ==
Historical population

Year	Pop.	±%
1869	866	—
1880	891	+2.9%
1890	930	+4.4%
1900	966	+3.9%
1910	958	−0.8%

Year	Pop.	±%
1921	1,071	+11.8%
1930	1,173	+9.5%
1950	1,026	−12.5%
1961	1,001	−2.4%
1970	897	−10.4%

Year	Pop.	±%
1980	883	−1.6%
1991	927	+5.0%
2001	933	+0.6%
2011	893	−4.3%
2021	877	−1.8%

Source: Censuses

== Transport ==
The I/50 road (part of the European route E50) from Brno to Uherské Hradiště runs through the municipality.

Brankovice is located on the Brno–Uherské Hradiště railway line.

== Sights ==
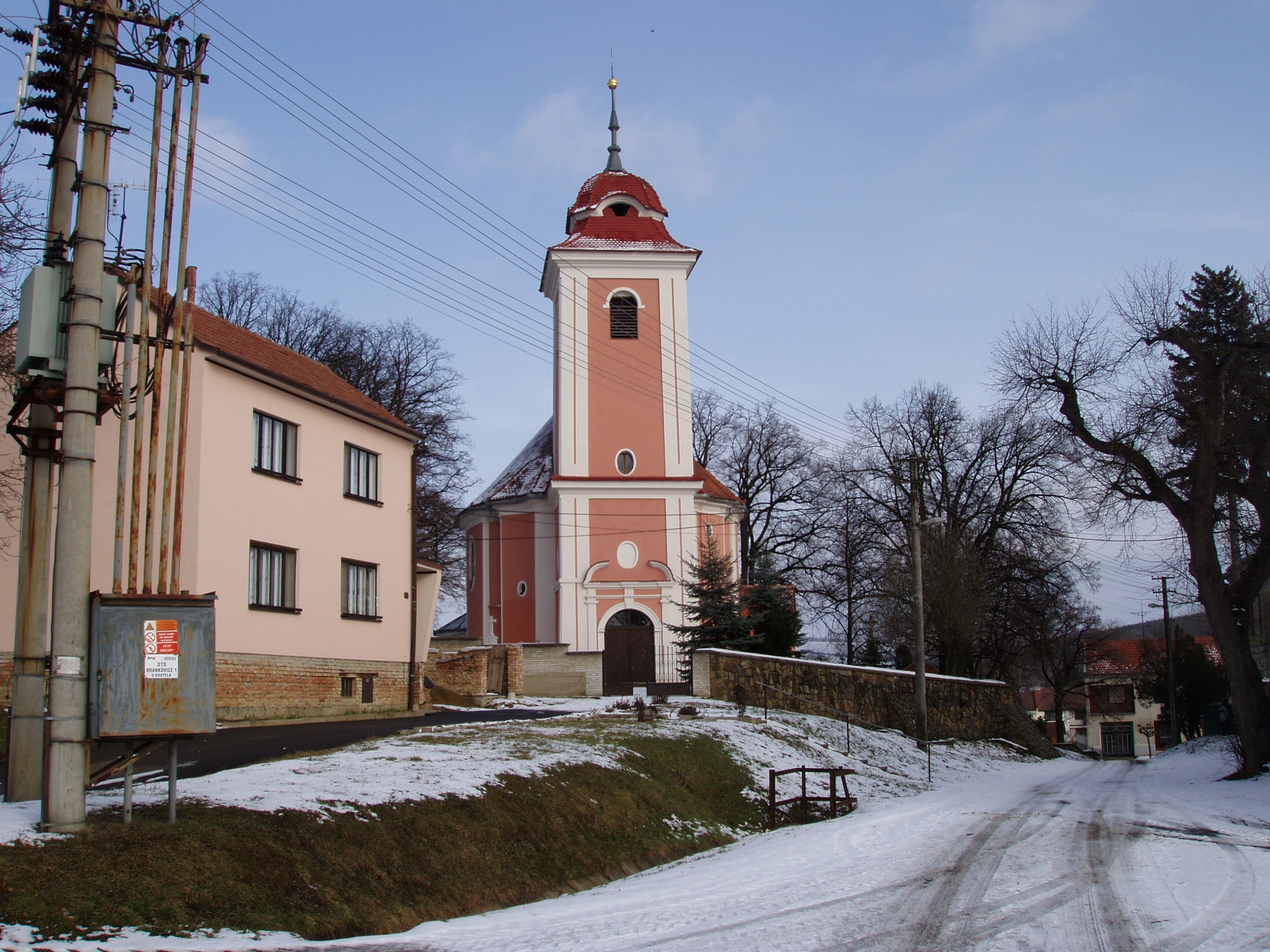
Church of Saint Nicholas

The main landmark of Brankovice is the Church of Saint Nicholas. It was built in the Baroque style in 1714, on the site of an older church, which burned down in 1690.
