= Litenčice =

- Market town
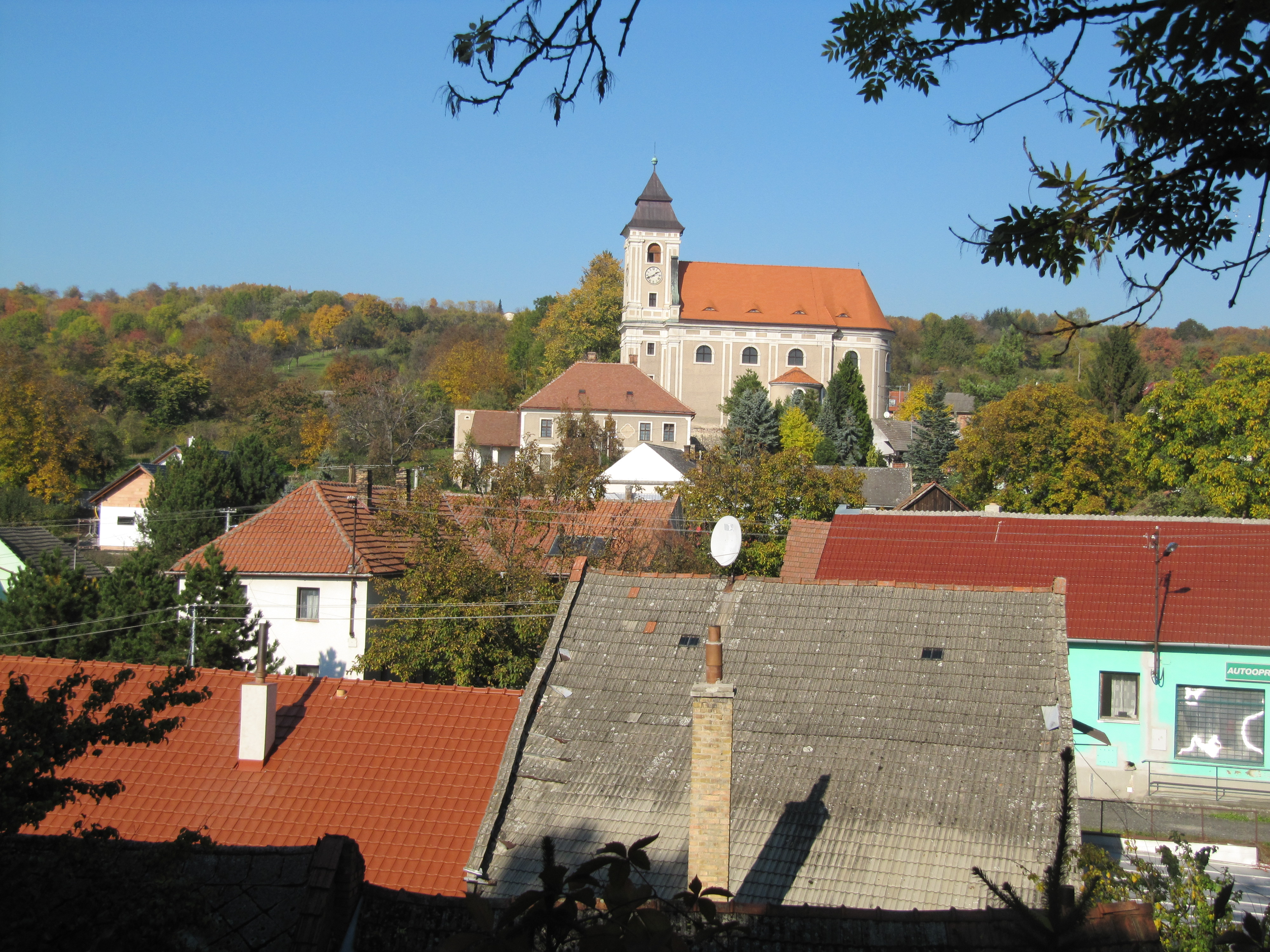
- View from the Litenčice Castle

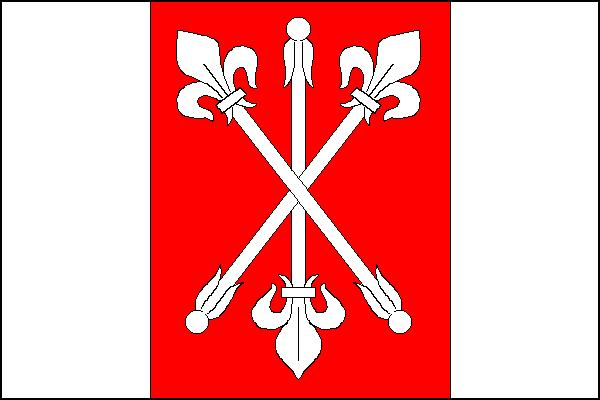
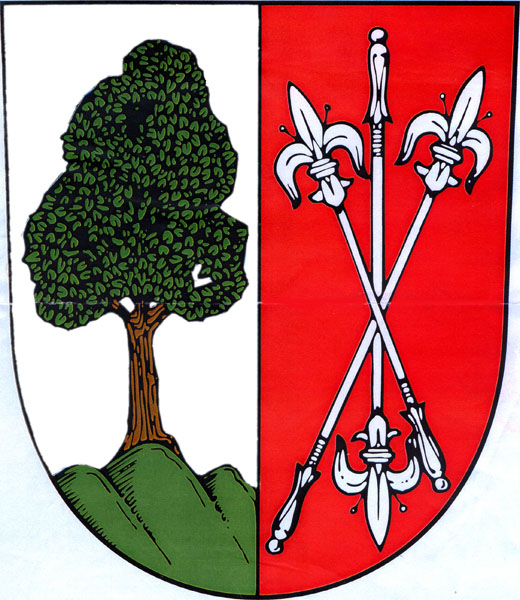
- Flag Coat of arms

- Location in the Czech Republic
- Coordinates: 49°12′8″N 17°12′30″E
- Country: Czech Republic
- Region: Zlín
- District: Kroměříž
- First mentioned: 1141

Area
  - Total: 10.53 km^{2} (4.07 sq mi)
- Elevation: 358 m (1,175 ft)

Population (2026-01-01)
  - Total: 461
  - Density: 43.8/km^{2} (113/sq mi)
- Time zone: UTC+1 (CET)
  - Summer (DST): UTC+2 (CEST)
- Postal code: 768 13
- Website: www.litencice.com

Litenčice (Czech pronunciation: [ˈlɪtɛntʃɪtsɛ]; German: Litentschitz) is a market town in Kroměříž District in the Zlín Region of the Czech Republic. It has about 500 inhabitants.

== Administrative division ==
Litenčice consists of two municipal parts (in brackets population according to the 2021 census):

- Litenčice (363)
- Strabenice (88)

== Geography ==
Litenčice is located about 17 kilometres (11 mi) southwest of Kroměříž and 32 km (20 mi) west of Zlín. It lies in the Litenčice Hills. The highest point is at 489 m (1,604 ft) above sea level.

== History ==
Archaeological findings of an early medieval burial site denote a settlement already during the Great Moravian empire. The first written mention of Litenčice is from 1141 in a deed issued by bishop Jindřich Zdík in a rental of the Spytihněv archdeaconry.

A fortress existed here from the second half of the 14th century, however, it was first mentioned in 1437, when it was held by the Zástřizl family. In 1667, during the rule of archbishop Péter Pázmány, it was largely rebuilt to a Baroque palace.

== Demographics ==
Historical population

Year	Pop.	±%
1869	945	—
1880	1,097	+16.1%
1890	1,030	−6.1%
1900	1,023	−0.7%
1910	1,072	+4.8%

Year	Pop.	±%
1921	1,008	−6.0%
1930	964	−4.4%
1950	796	−17.4%
1961	755	−5.2%
1970	665	−11.9%

Year	Pop.	±%
1980	542	−18.5%
1991	469	−13.5%
2001	466	−0.6%
2011	494	+6.0%
2021	451	−8.7%

Source: Censuses

== Transport ==
There are no railways or major roads passing through the municipality.

== Sights ==
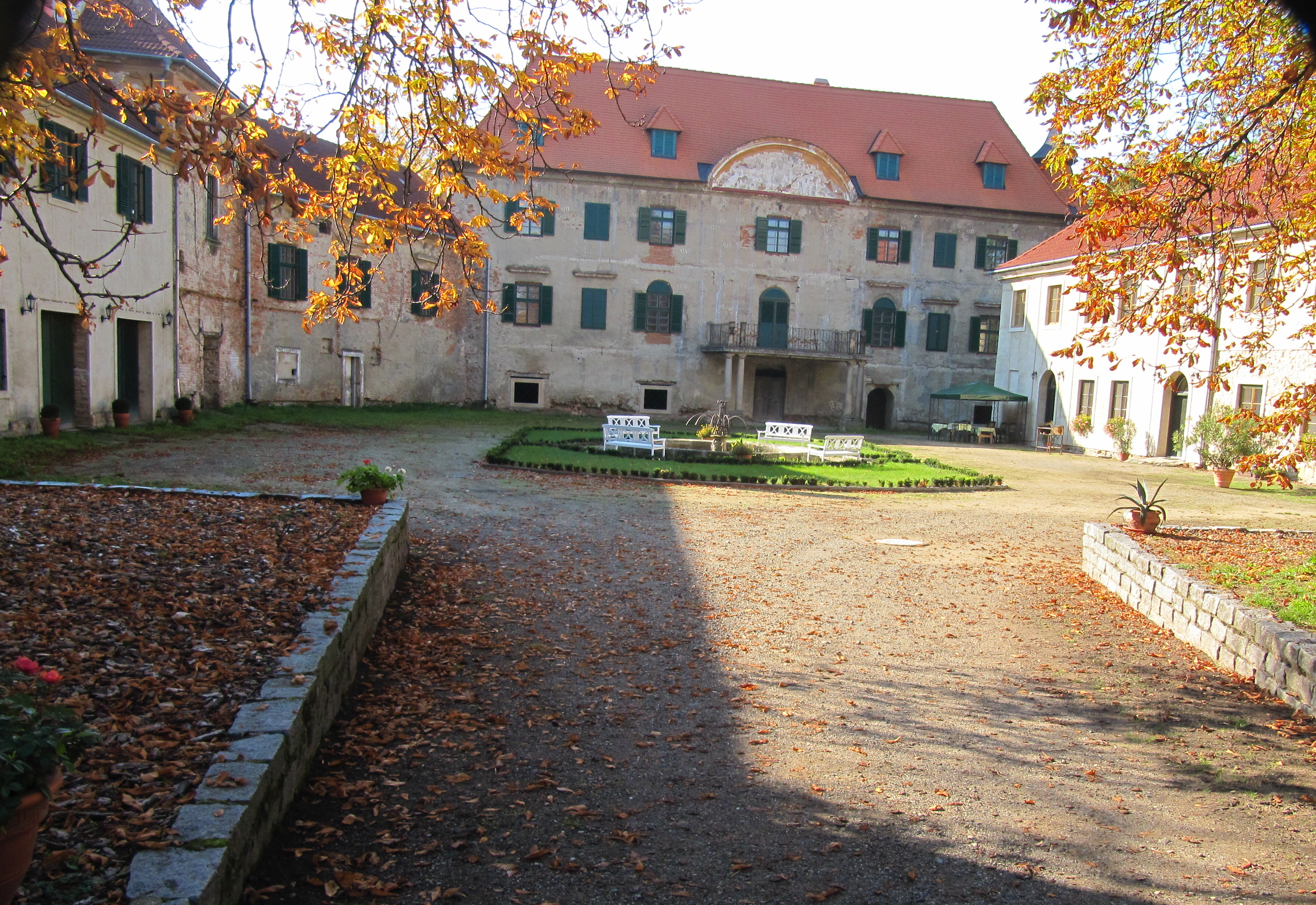
Litenčice Castle

The main landmarks of Litenčice are the church and the castle. The Church of Saints Peter and Paul is a massive building, built after 1700.

The Litenčice Castle is a valuable four-winged building, gradually created by Renaissance, Baroque and Neoclassical reconstructions of the original Gothic fortress. Today it is privately owned and inaccessible.
