= Litenčice Hills =

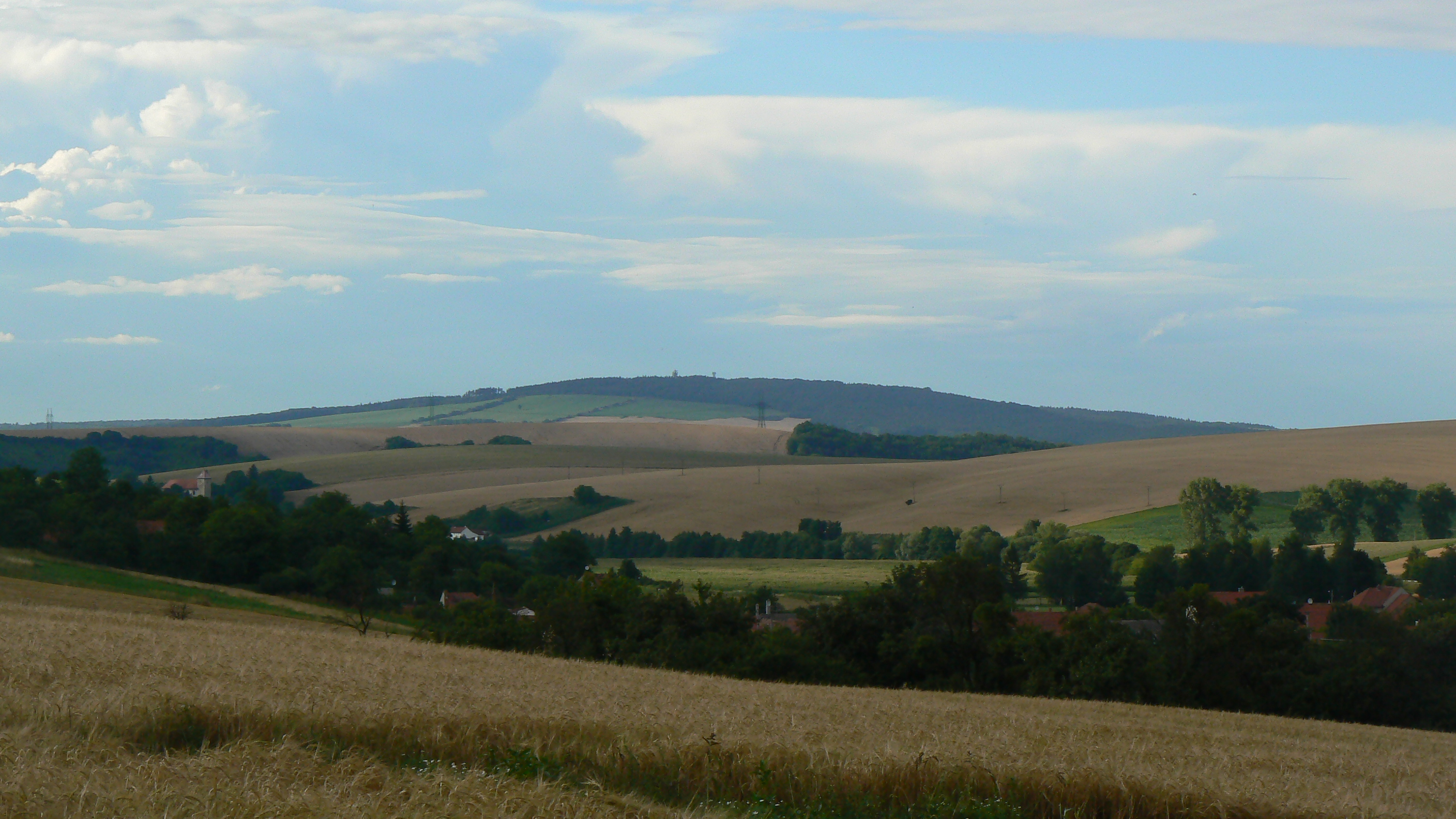
- Hradisko, the highest peak

Highest point
- Peak: Hradisko
- Elevation: 519 m (1,703 ft)

Dimensions
- Length: 42 km (26 mi)
- Area: 590 km^{2} (230 mi^{2})

Geography
- Litenčice Hills in the Outer Western Carpathians, marked in red
- Country: Czech Republic
- Regions: Zlín, South Moravian, Olomouc
- Range coordinates: 49°14′N 17°9′E
- Parent range: Central Moravian Carpathians

Geology
- Rock type(s): Flysch, claystone, loess

The Litenčice Hills (Czech: Litenčická pahorkatina) are uplands and a geomorphological mesoregion of the Czech Republic. It is located in the Zlín, South Moravian and Olomouc regions. The uplands are named after the market town of Litenčice.

== Geomorphology ==
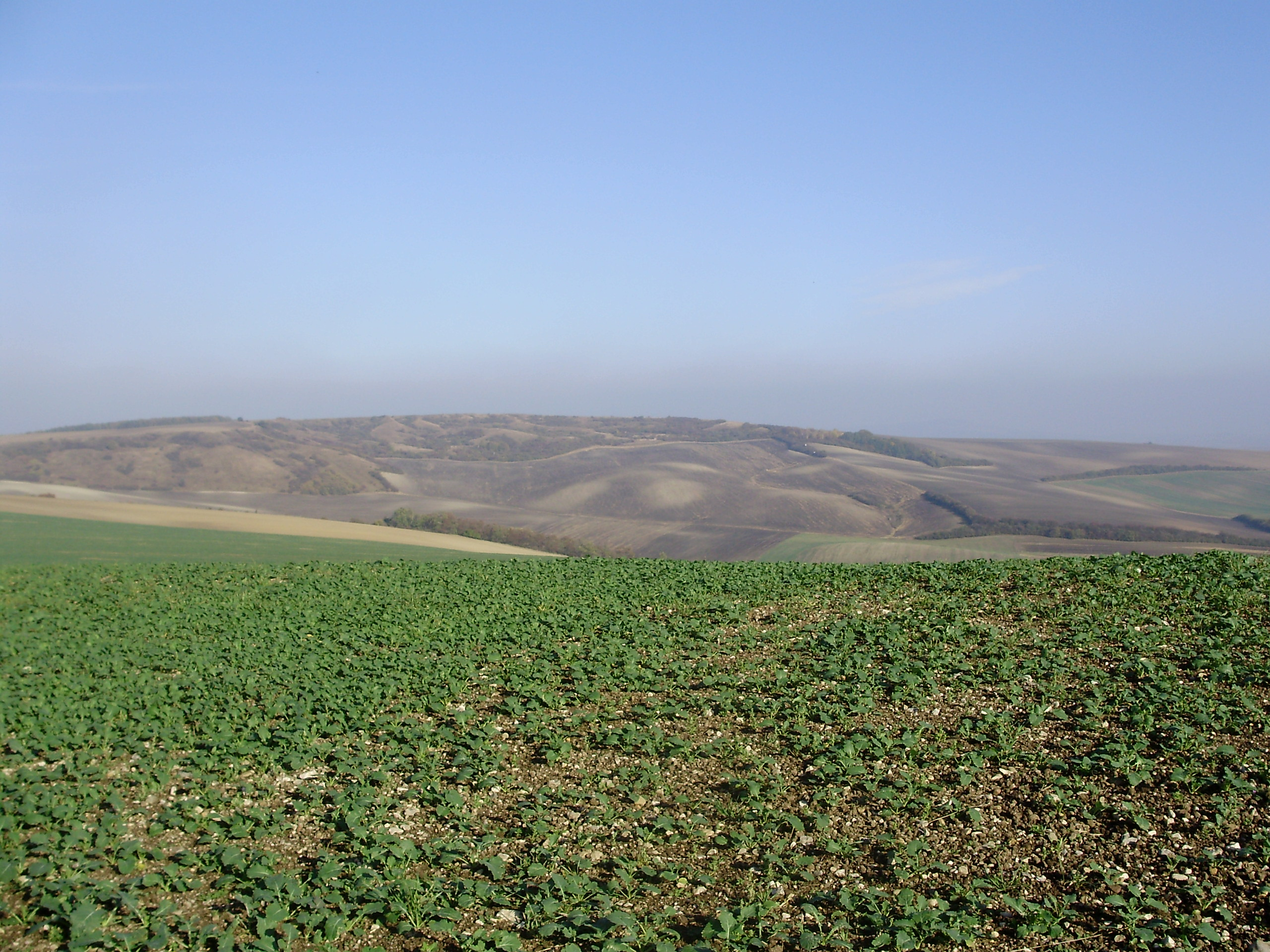
Větrníky National Nature Monument, an enclave of steppe vegetation within the agricultural landscape

The Litenčice Hills are a mesoregion of the Central Moravian Carpathians within the Outer Western Carpathians. The terrain is characterised by a central highland area surrounded by upland terrain. It was shaped by erosion and denudation, with a significant influence from tectonics. The uplands are further subdivided into the microregions of Bučovice Uplands, Orlovice Highlands and Zdounky Furrow.

The highest peaks of the Litenčice Hills are:

- Hradisko, 519 m (1,703 ft)
- Kleštěnec, 498 m (1,634 ft)
- Nad Bořickou zahradou, 454 m (1,490 ft)
- Klín, 448 m (1,470 ft)
- Žešov, 426 m (1,398 ft)
- Tupá hora, 416 m (1,365 ft)
- Okrouhlice, 416 m (1,365 ft)
- Chlum, 402 m (1,319 ft)
- Bralová, 400 m (1,312 ft)
- Troják, 397 m (1,302 ft)

== Geography ==
View from the Strabišov-Oulehla National Nature Reserve towards Lísky

The territory has a relatively regular shape and stretches from west to east. The uplands has an area of 590 square kilometres (230 sq mi) and an average elevation of 294 m (965 ft). It is approximately 42 km (26 mi) long and almost 21 km (13 mi) wide in its widest part.

There are neither significant rivers nor bodies of water in the Litenčice Hills. The Litava flows along the southern border of the territory and the Haná flows along the northern border (mostly outside the Litenčice Hills). The Kyjovka briefly crosses the southern part of the Litenčice Hills. The northern and eastern part of the area is drained by the Morava, which flows just outside the eastern border of the uplands.

Most of the town of Kroměříž is located in the Litenčice Hills, making it the most populous settlement of the area. Other towns in the area include Morkovice-Slížany, most of Slavkov u Brna and Bučovice, and part of Vyškov and Rousínov.

== Geology ==
The geological bedrock consists of sedimentary rocks: flysch, clay, claystone, sand and gravel, which are overlain by loess.

== Nature ==
The landscape is predominantly agricultural, but continuously forested elevations rise from the landscape. There are no protected landscape areas in the Litenčice Hills, but there are several short-scale protected areas. The most important protected areas are the Strabišov-Oulehla National Nature Reserve, Větrníky National Nature Monument, Malhotky National Nature Monument and Křéby National Nature Monument.
