= Žatčany =

- Municipality
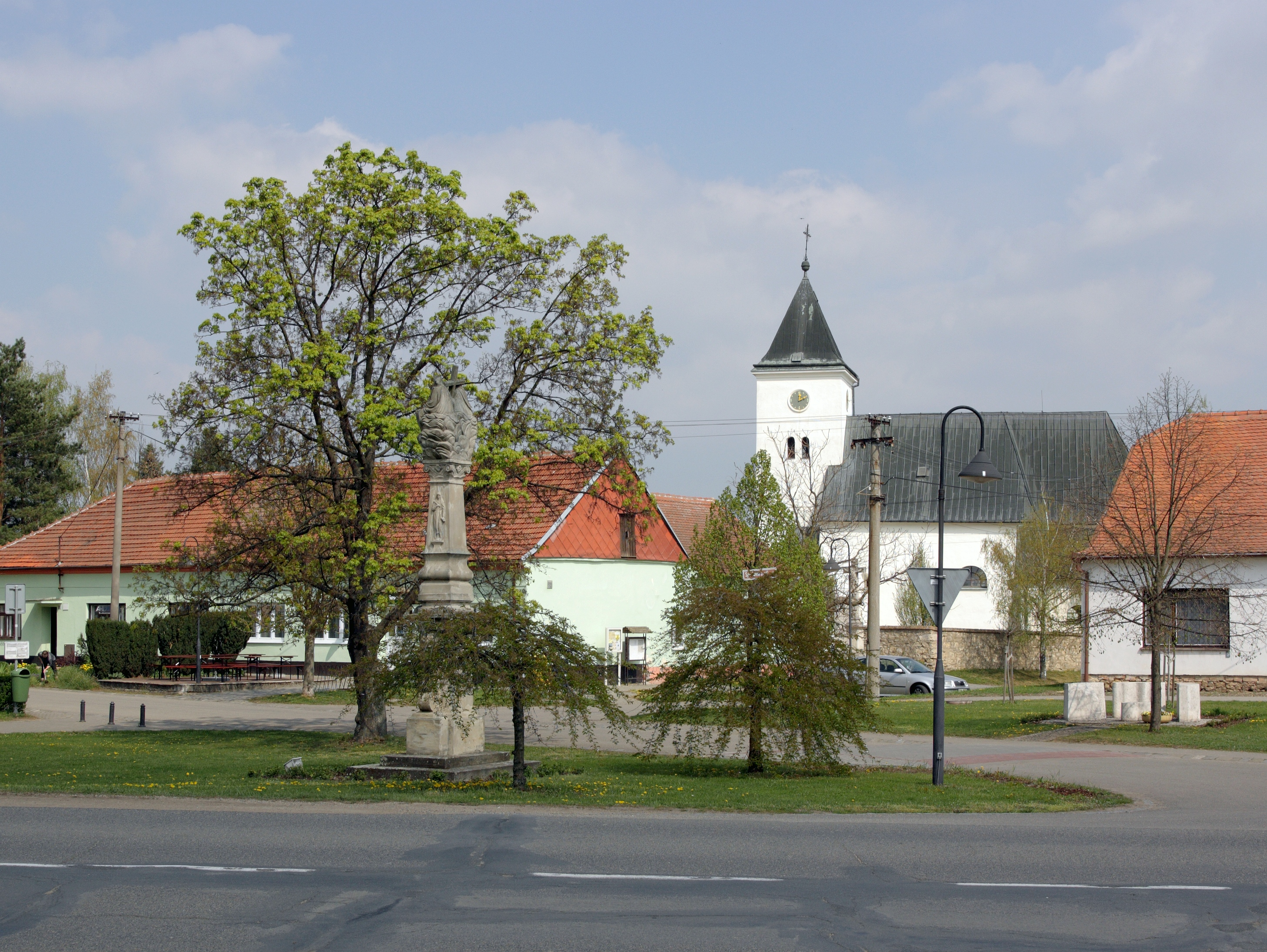
- Centre of Žatčany

- Flag Coat of arms

- Location in the Czech Republic
- Coordinates: 49°5′16″N 16°44′2″E
- Country: Czech Republic
- Region: South Moravian
- District: Brno-Country
- First mentioned: 1141

Area
  - Total: 9.68 km^{2} (3.74 sq mi)
- Elevation: 192 m (630 ft)

Population (2026-01-01)
  - Total: 961
  - Density: 99.3/km^{2} (257/sq mi)
- Time zone: UTC+1 (CET)
  - Summer (DST): UTC+2 (CEST)
- Postal code: 664 53
- Website: www.obeczatcany.cz

Žatčany is a municipality and village in Brno-Country District in the South Moravian Region of the Czech Republic. It has about 1,000 inhabitants.

Žatčany lies approximately 16 kilometres (10 mi) south-east of Brno and 201 km (125 mi) south-east of Prague.

== Demographics ==
Historical population
Year	Pop.	±%
1869	715	—
1880	755	+5.6%
1890	781	+3.4%
1900	800	+2.4%
1910	902	+12.7%
1921	937	+3.9%
1930	935	−0.2%
1950	859	−8.1%
1961	922	+7.3%
1970	856	−7.2%
1980	804	−6.1%
1991	764	−5.0%
2001	757	−0.9%
2011	767	+1.3%
2021	907	+18.3%
Source: Censuses
