= Otnice =

- Municipality
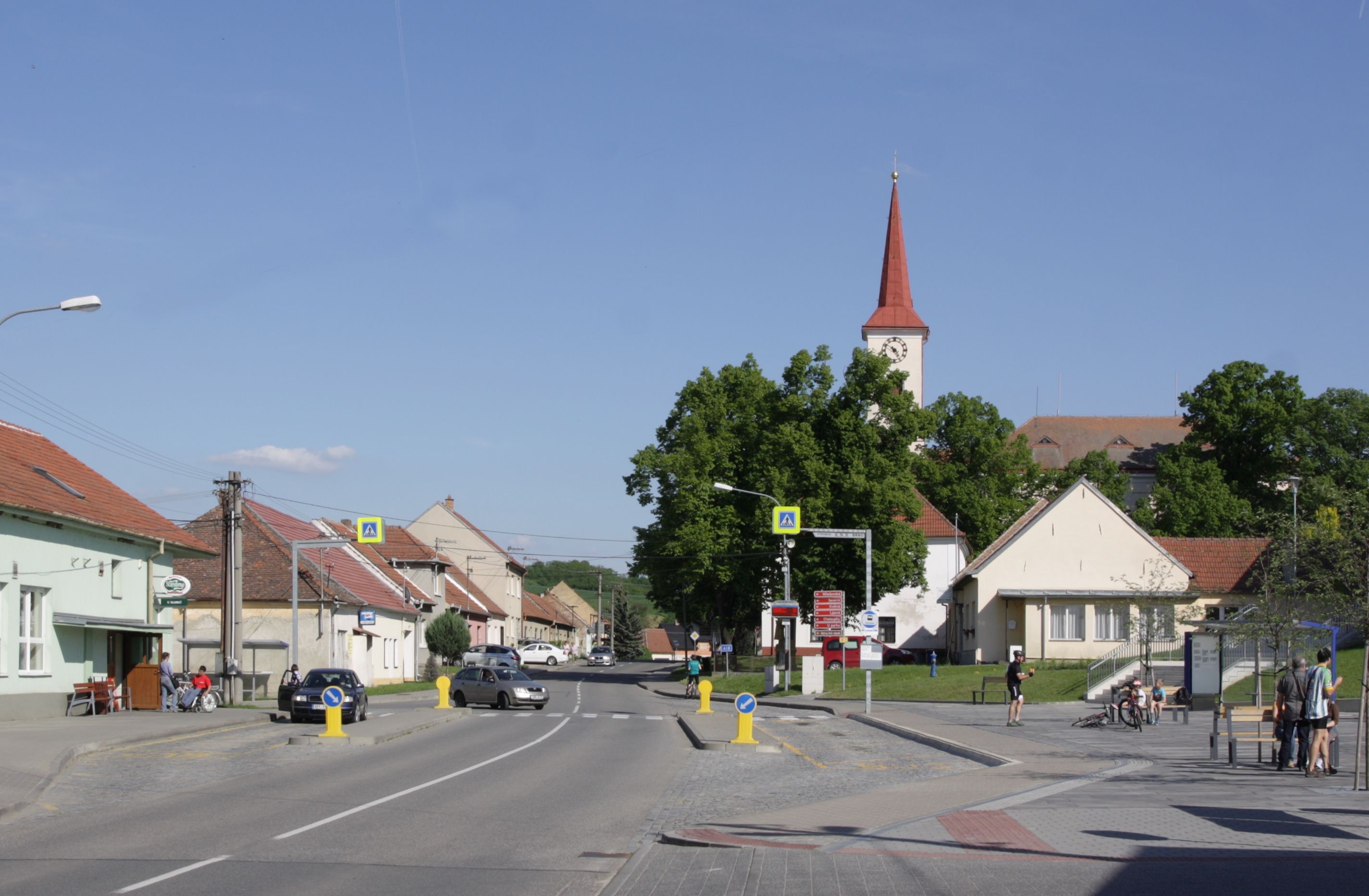
- Centre of Otnice

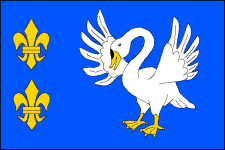
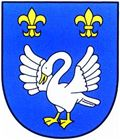
- Flag Coat of arms

- Location in the Czech Republic
- Coordinates: 49°5′11″N 16°48′52″E
- Country: Czech Republic
- Region: South Moravian
- District: Vyškov
- First mentioned: 1255

Area
  - Total: 8.70 km^{2} (3.36 sq mi)
- Elevation: 216 m (709 ft)

Population (2026-01-01)
  - Total: 1,571
  - Density: 181/km^{2} (468/sq mi)
- Time zone: UTC+1 (CET)
  - Summer (DST): UTC+2 (CEST)
- Postal code: 683 54
- Website: www.otnice.cz

Otnice is a municipality and village in Vyškov District in the South Moravian Region of the Czech Republic. It has about 1,600 inhabitants.

== Etymology ==
The name Otnice is derived from the personal name Oten.

== Geography ==
Otnice is located about 17 kilometres (11 mi) southeast of Brno. It lies in an agricultural landscape, which mostly belongs to the Ždánice Forest. The northwestern part of the municipal territory extends into the Dyje–Svratka Valley. The highest point is the flat hill Malý Sádkový vrch at 268 m (879 ft) above sea level. The municipality is situated at the confluence of two small streams, Otnický potok and Bošovický potok.

== History ==
The first written mention of Otnice is from 1255.

== Demographics ==
Historical population

Year	Pop.	±%
1869	778	—
1880	888	+14.1%
1890	907	+2.1%
1900	1,010	+11.4%
1910	1,140	+12.9%

Year	Pop.	±%
1921	1,225	+7.5%
1930	1,386	+13.1%
1950	1,382	−0.3%
1961	1,535	+11.1%
1970	1,515	−1.3%

Year	Pop.	±%
1980	1,485	−2.0%
1991	1,365	−8.1%
2001	1,383	+1.3%
2011	1,470	+6.3%
2021	1,567	+6.6%

Source: Censuses

== Economy ==
The municipality is mainly focused on agriculture.

== Transport ==
There are no railways or major roads passing through the municipality.

== Sights ==
The main landmark of Otnice is the Church of Saint Aloysius. The current Neo-Renaissance structure was built in 1855–1856.
