= Lovčičky =

- Municipality
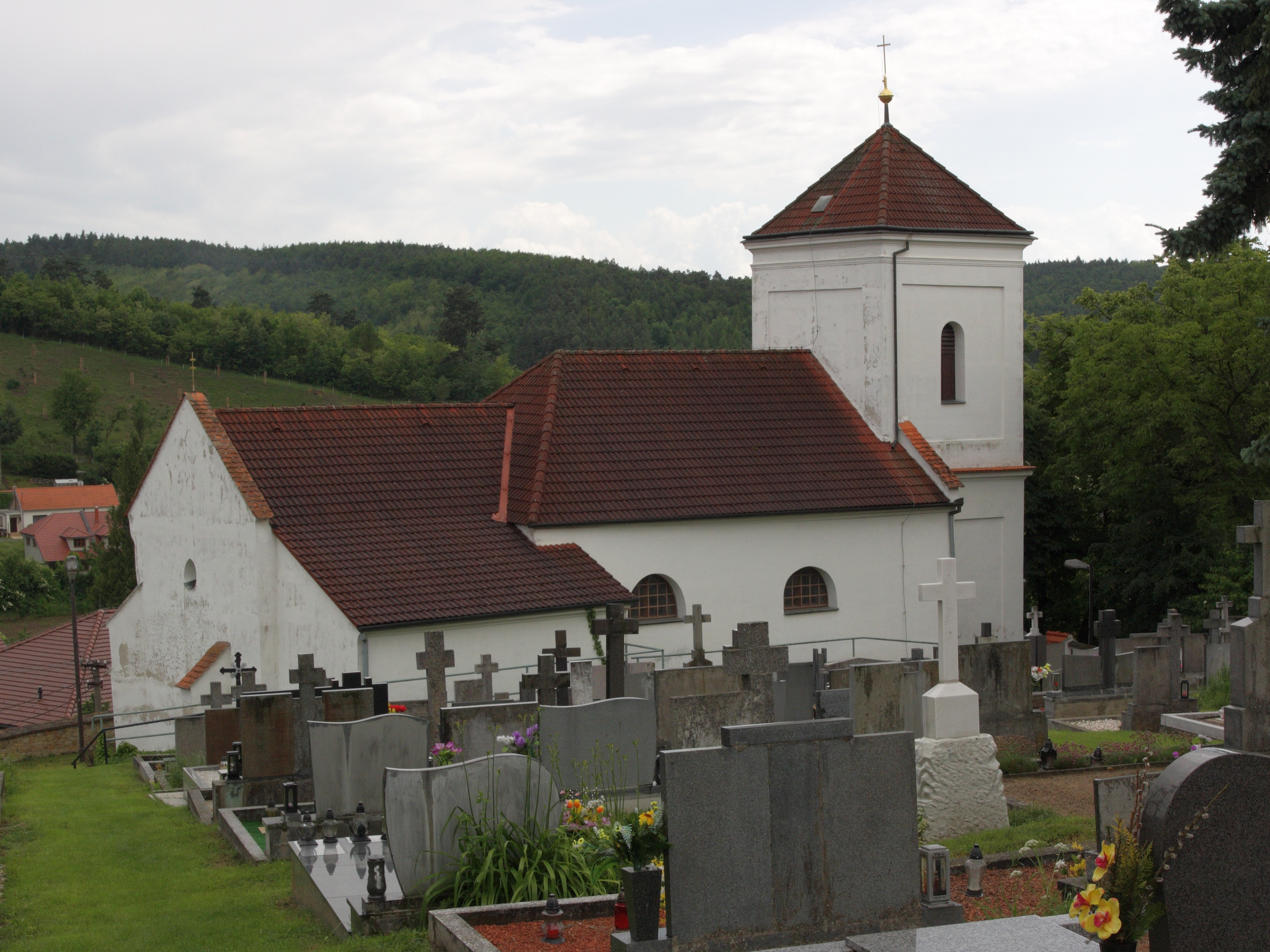
- Church of Saint Wenceslaus

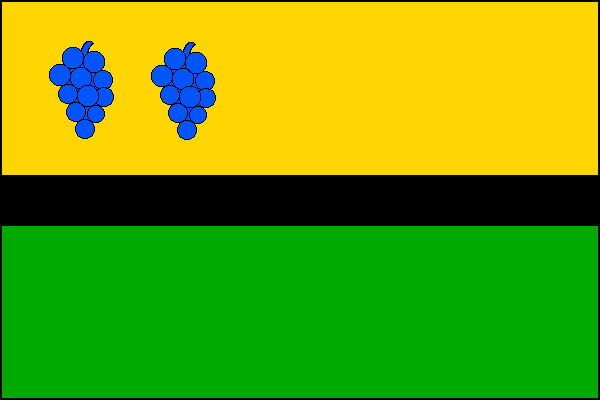
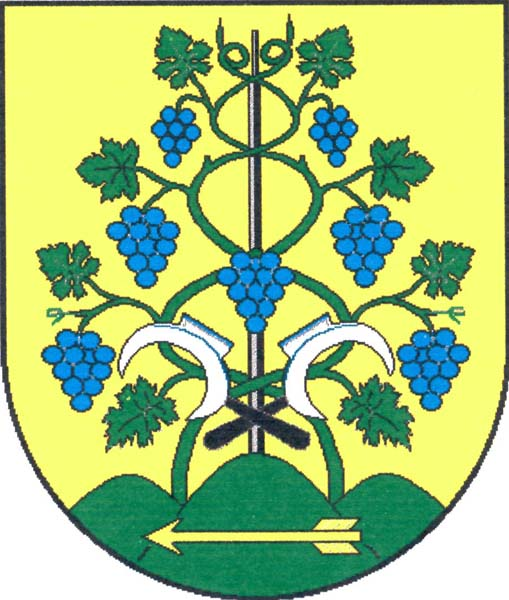
- Flag Coat of arms

- Location in the Czech Republic
- Coordinates: 49°4′5″N 16°51′0″E
- Country: Czech Republic
- Region: South Moravian
- District: Vyškov
- First mentioned: 1141

Area
  - Total: 4.04 km^{2} (1.56 sq mi)
- Elevation: 260 m (850 ft)

Population (2026-01-01)
  - Total: 736
  - Density: 182/km^{2} (472/sq mi)
- Time zone: UTC+1 (CET)
  - Summer (DST): UTC+2 (CEST)
- Postal code: 683 54
- Website: www.lovcicky.cz

Lovčičky is a municipality and village in Vyškov District in the South Moravian Region of the Czech Republic. It has about 700 inhabitants.

Lovčičky lies approximately 25 kilometres (16 mi) south-west of Vyškov, 23 km (14 mi) south-east of Brno, and 209 km (130 mi) south-east of Prague.

== Demographics ==
Historical population
Year	Pop.	±%
1869	649	—
1880	672	+3.5%
1890	683	+1.6%
1900	759	+11.1%
1910	955	+25.8%
1921	910	−4.7%
1930	954	+4.8%
1950	790	−17.2%
1961	840	+6.3%
1970	723	−13.9%
1980	614	−15.1%
1991	512	−16.6%
2001	539	+5.3%
2011	586	+8.7%
2021	722	+23.2%
Source: Censuses
