= Chvalnov-Lísky =

- Municipality
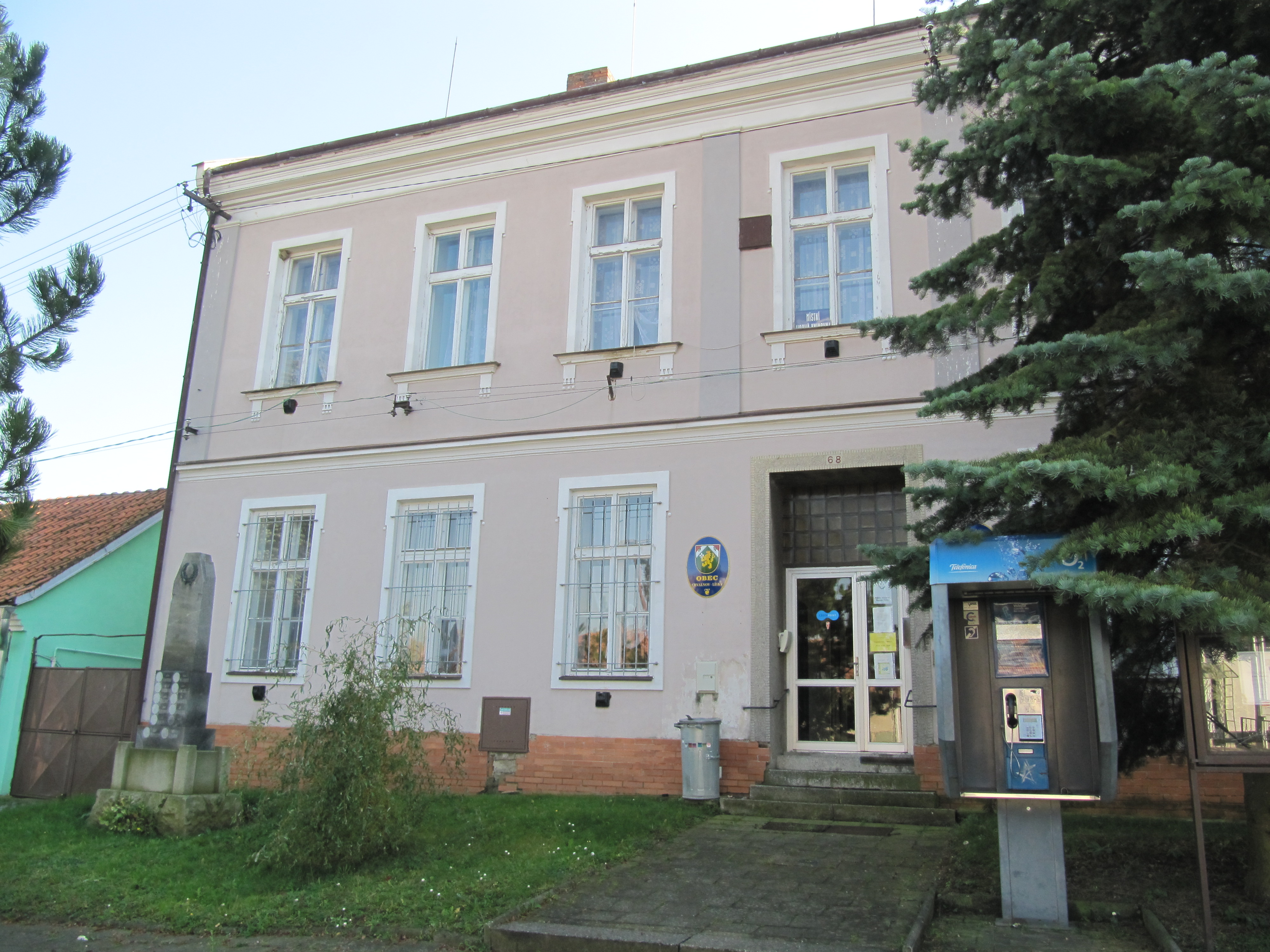
- Municipal office

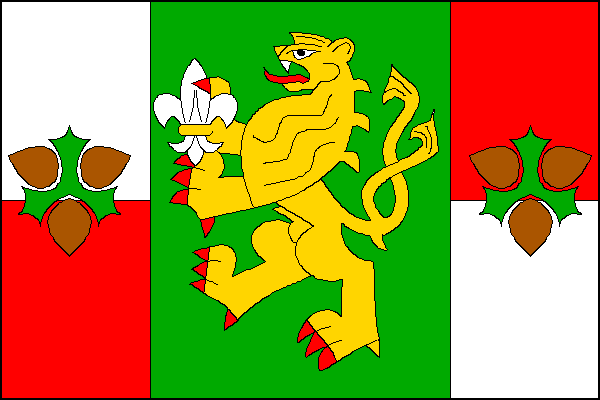
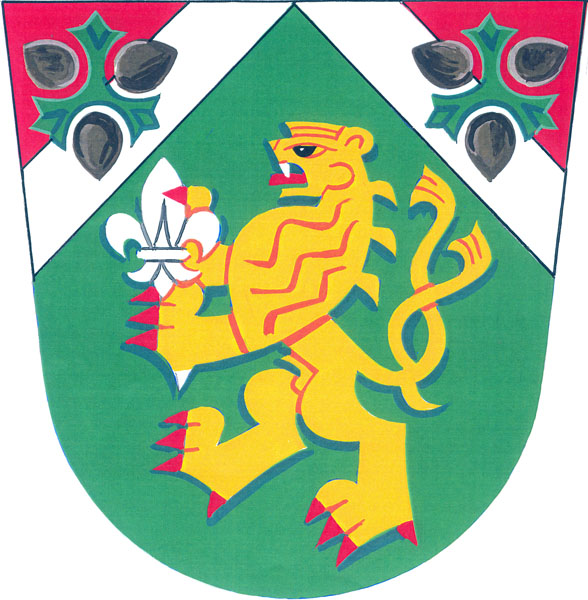
- Flag Coat of arms

- Location in the Czech Republic
- Coordinates: 49°10′0″N 17°14′0″E
- Country: Czech Republic
- Region: Zlín
- District: Kroměříž
- First mentioned: 1371

Area
  - Total: 8.84 km^{2} (3.41 sq mi)
- Elevation: 305 m (1,001 ft)

Population (2026-01-01)
  - Total: 239
  - Density: 27.0/km^{2} (70.0/sq mi)
- Time zone: UTC+1 (CET)
  - Summer (DST): UTC+2 (CEST)
- Postal code: 768 05
- Website: www.chvalnovlisky.cz

Chvalnov-Lísky is a municipality in Kroměříž District in the Zlín Region of the Czech Republic. It has about 200 inhabitants.

Chvalnov-Lísky lies approximately 19 kilometres (12 mi) south-west of Kroměříž, 33 km (21 mi) west of Zlín, and 227 km (141 mi) south-east of Prague. The Litava River originates in the municipal territory.

== Administrative division ==
Chvalnov-Lísky consists of two municipal parts (in brackets population according to the 2021 census):

- Chvalnov (181)
- Lísky (43)

== Demographics ==
Historical population
Year	Pop.	±%
1869	604	—
1880	628	+4.0%
1890	623	−0.8%
1900	598	−4.0%
1910	622	+4.0%
1921	664	+6.8%
1930	638	−3.9%
1950	467	−26.8%
1961	442	−5.4%
1970	404	−8.6%
1980	332	−17.8%
1991	260	−21.7%
2001	276	+6.2%
2011	240	−13.0%
2021	224	−6.7%
Source: Censuses
