= Zástřizly =

- Municipality
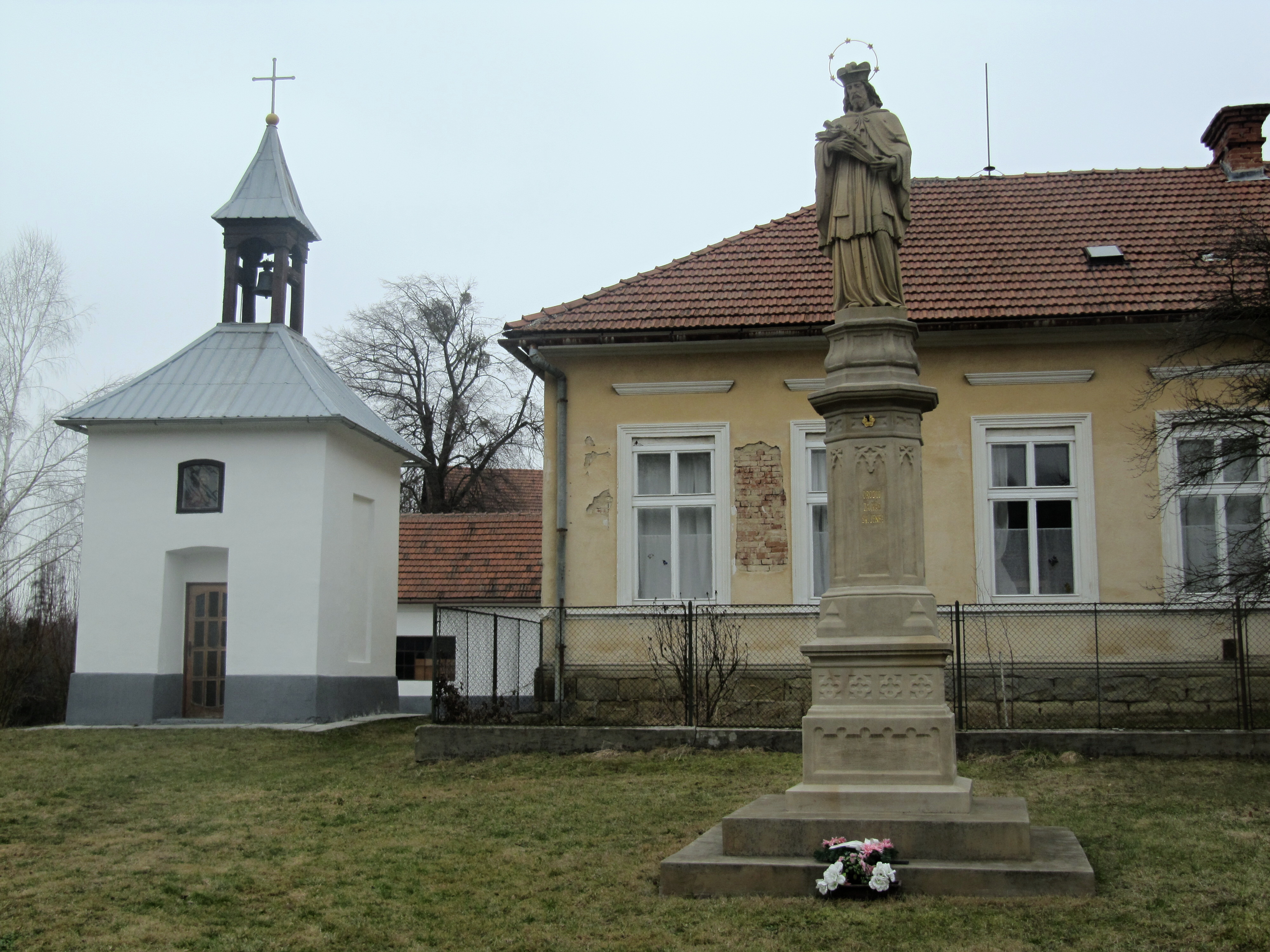
- Chapel and statue of Saint John of Nepomuk

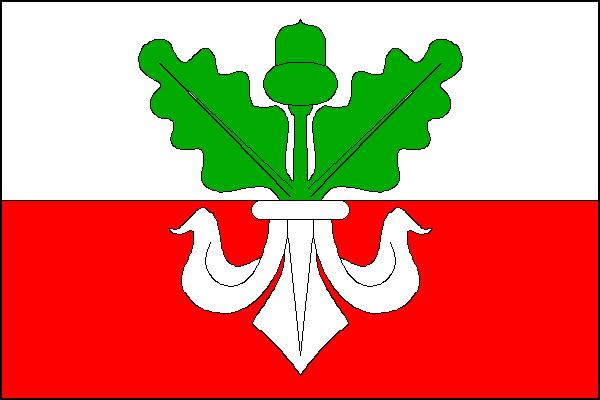
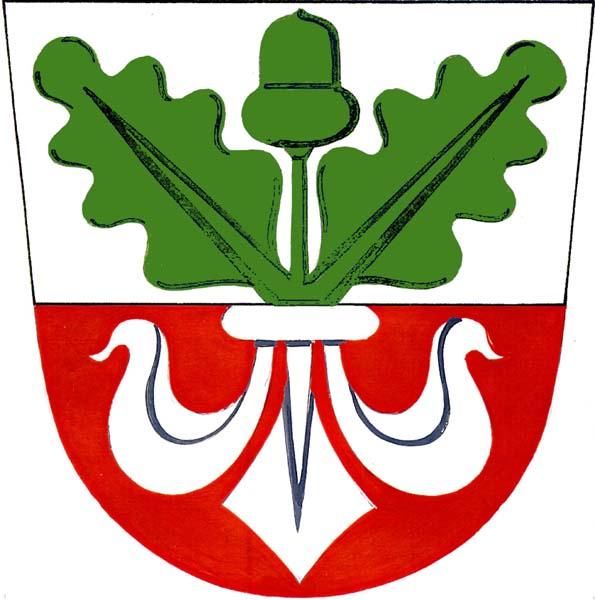
- Flag Coat of arms

- Location in the Czech Republic
- Coordinates: 49°8′59″N 17°14′6″E
- Country: Czech Republic
- Region: Zlín
- District: Kroměříž
- First mentioned: 1349

Area
  - Total: 6.65 km^{2} (2.57 sq mi)
- Elevation: 318 m (1,043 ft)

Population (2026-01-01)
  - Total: 148
  - Density: 22.3/km^{2} (57.6/sq mi)
- Time zone: UTC+1 (CET)
  - Summer (DST): UTC+2 (CEST)
- Postal code: 768 05
- Website: www.zastrizly.cz

Zástřizly is a municipality and village in Kroměříž District in the Zlín Region of the Czech Republic. It has about 100 inhabitants.

Zástřizly lies approximately 20 kilometres (12 mi) south-west of Kroměříž, 32 km (20 mi) west of Zlín, and 230 km (140 mi) south-east of Prague.

== Demographics ==
Historical population
| Year | Pop. | ±% |
|---|---|---|
| 1869 | 339 | — |
| 1880 | 283 | −16.5% |
| 1890 | 319 | +12.7% |
| 1900 | 316 | −0.9% |
| 1910 | 277 | −12.3% |
| 1921 | 305 | +10.1% |
| 1930 | 309 | +1.3% |
| 1950 | 218 | −29.4% |
| 1961 | 238 | +9.2% |
| 1970 | 220 | −7.6% |
| 1980 | 174 | −20.9% |
| 1991 | 134 | −23.0% |
| 2001 | 135 | +0.7% |
| 2011 | 139 | +3.0% |
| 2021 | 137 | −1.4% |
Source: Censuses
