= Vážany nad Litavou =

- Municipality
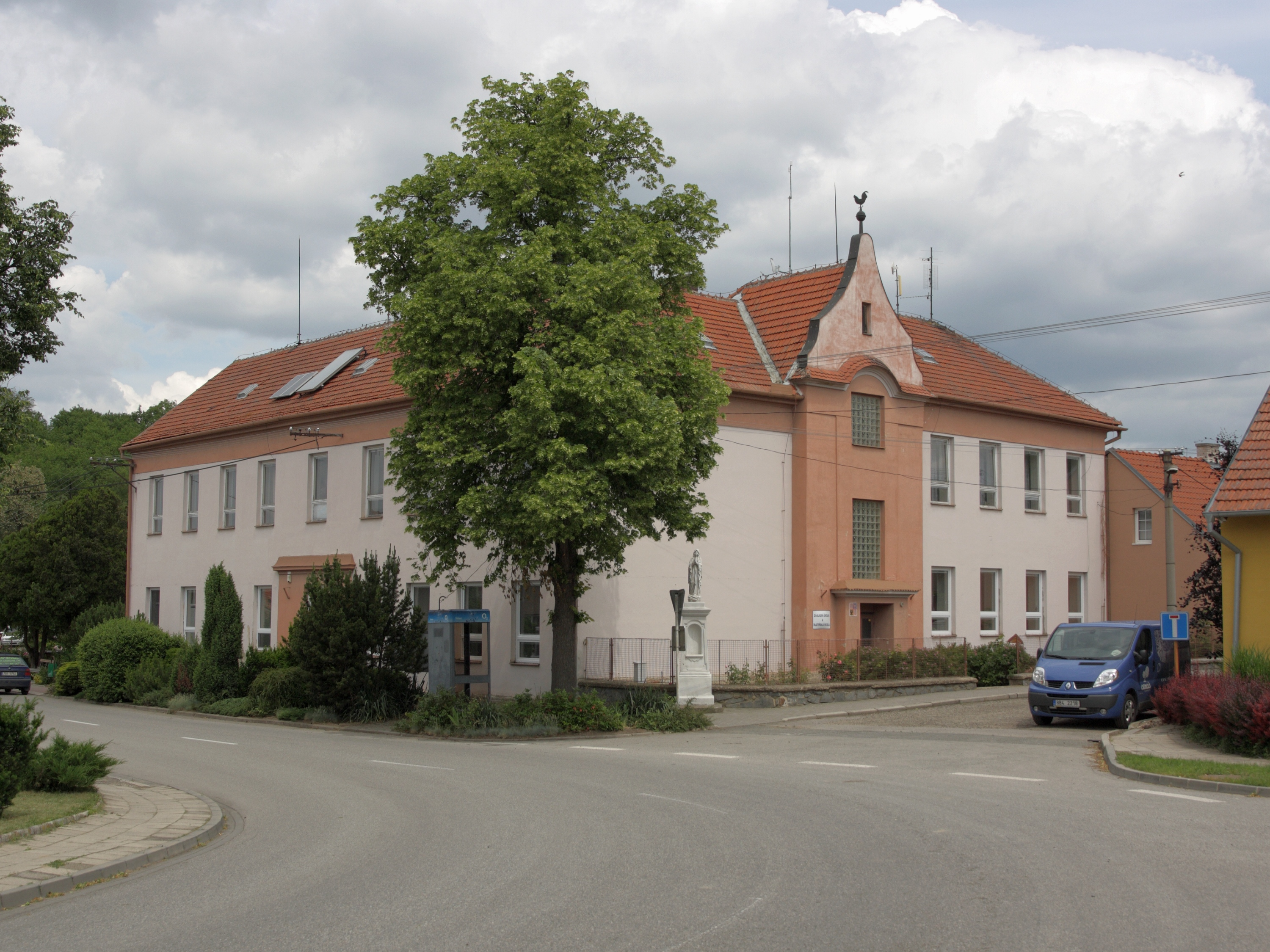
- Primary school

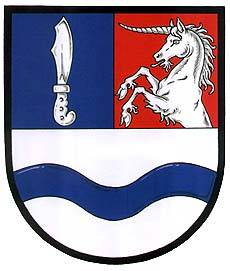
- Flag Coat of arms

- Location in the Czech Republic
- Coordinates: 49°7′44″N 16°51′25″E
- Country: Czech Republic
- Region: South Moravian
- District: Vyškov
- First mentioned: 1287

Area
  - Total: 7.02 km^{2} (2.71 sq mi)
- Elevation: 211 m (692 ft)

Population (2026-01-01)
  - Total: 777
  - Density: 111/km^{2} (287/sq mi)
- Time zone: UTC+1 (CET)
  - Summer (DST): UTC+2 (CEST)
- Postal code: 684 01
- Website: vazanynadlitavou.cz

Vážany nad Litavou (until 1949 Linhartské Vážany) is a municipality and village in Vyškov District in the South Moravian Region of the Czech Republic. It has about 800 inhabitants.

Vážany nad Litavou lies approximately 19 kilometres (12 mi) south-west of Vyškov, 20 km (12 mi) south-east of Brno, and 206 km (128 mi) south-east of Prague.

== Demographics ==
Historical population
Year	Pop.	±%
1869	586	—
1880	698	+19.1%
1890	752	+7.7%
1900	832	+10.6%
1910	879	+5.6%
1921	953	+8.4%
1930	1,053	+10.5%
1950	899	−14.6%
1961	969	+7.8%
1970	822	−15.2%
1980	707	−14.0%
1991	631	−10.7%
2001	628	−0.5%
2011	685	+9.1%
2021	741	+8.2%
Source: Censuses
