= Křižanovice (Vyškov District) =

- Municipality
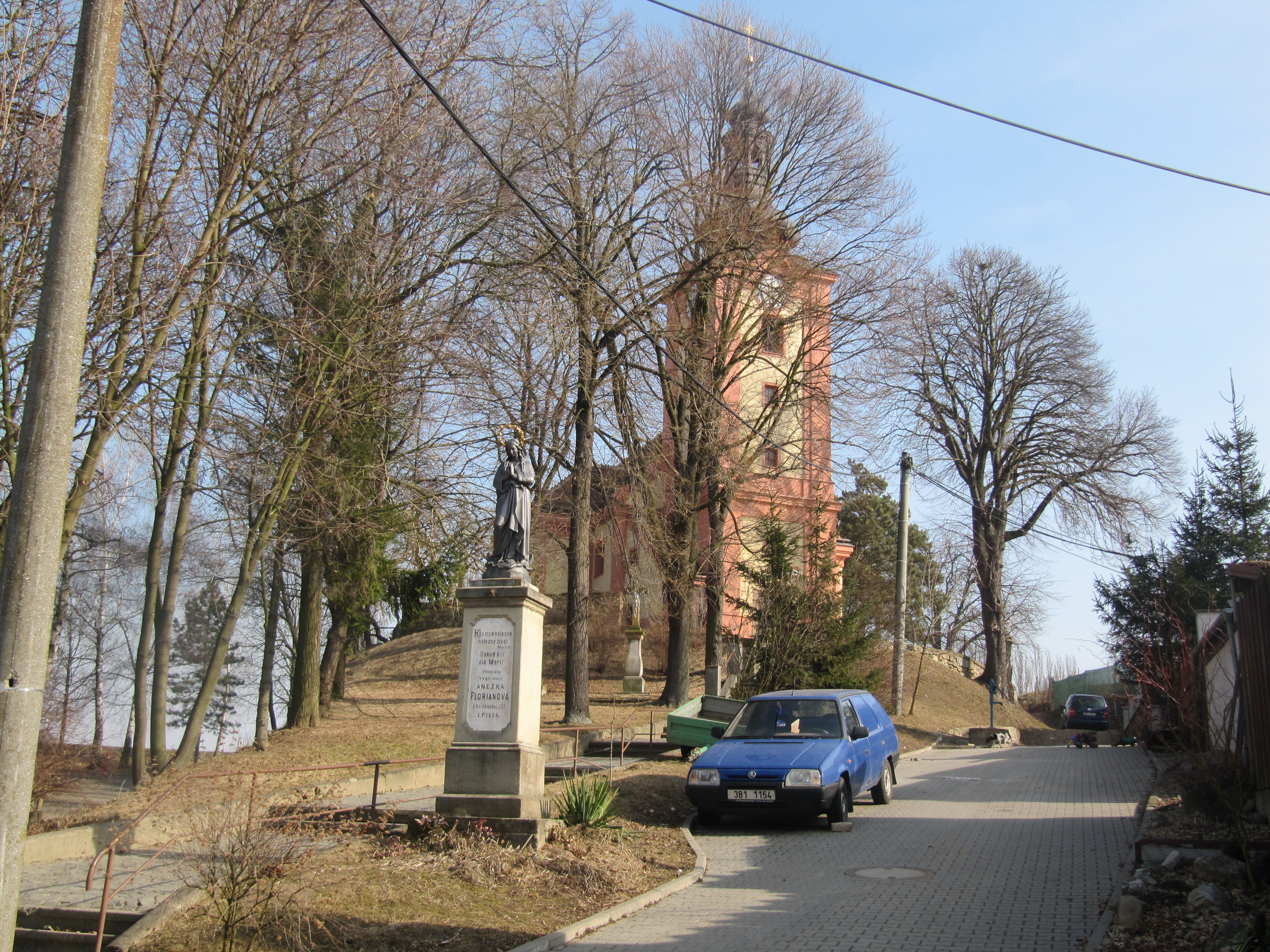
- Church of the Assumption of the Virgin Mary

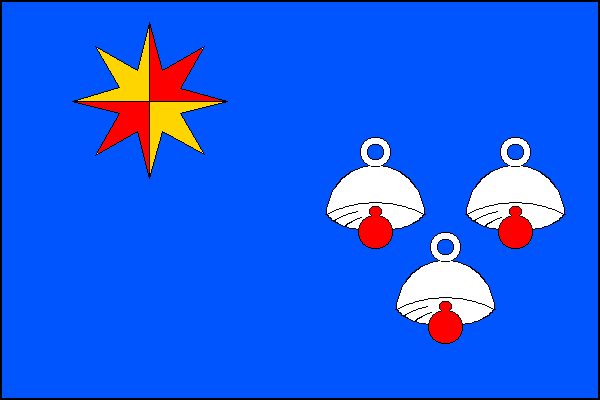
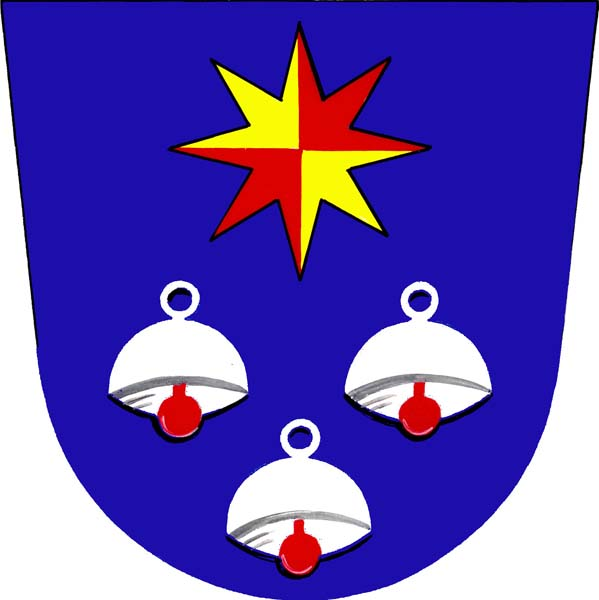
- Flag Coat of arms

- Location in the Czech Republic
- Coordinates: 49°8′32″N 16°56′21″E
- Country: Czech Republic
- Region: South Moravian
- District: Vyškov
- First mentioned: 1131

Area
  - Total: 4.79 km^{2} (1.85 sq mi)
- Elevation: 209 m (686 ft)

Population (2026-01-01)
  - Total: 826
  - Density: 172/km^{2} (447/sq mi)
- Time zone: UTC+1 (CET)
  - Summer (DST): UTC+2 (CEST)
- Postal code: 683 57
- Website: www.krizanovice.cz

Křižanovice is a municipality and village in Vyškov District in the South Moravian Region of the Czech Republic. It has about 800 inhabitants.

Křižanovice lies approximately 15 kilometres (9 mi) south of Vyškov, 25 km (16 mi) east of Brno, and 210 km (130 mi) south-east of Prague.

== Demographics ==
Historical population
Year	Pop.	±%
1869	477	—
1880	548	+14.9%
1890	554	+1.1%
1900	526	−5.1%
1910	611	+16.2%
1921	698	+14.2%
1930	742	+6.3%
1950	701	−5.5%
1961	750	+7.0%
1970	741	−1.2%
1980	768	+3.6%
1991	709	−7.7%
2001	709	+0.0%
2011	754	+6.3%
2021	795	+5.4%
Source: Censuses
