= Šaratice =

- Municipality
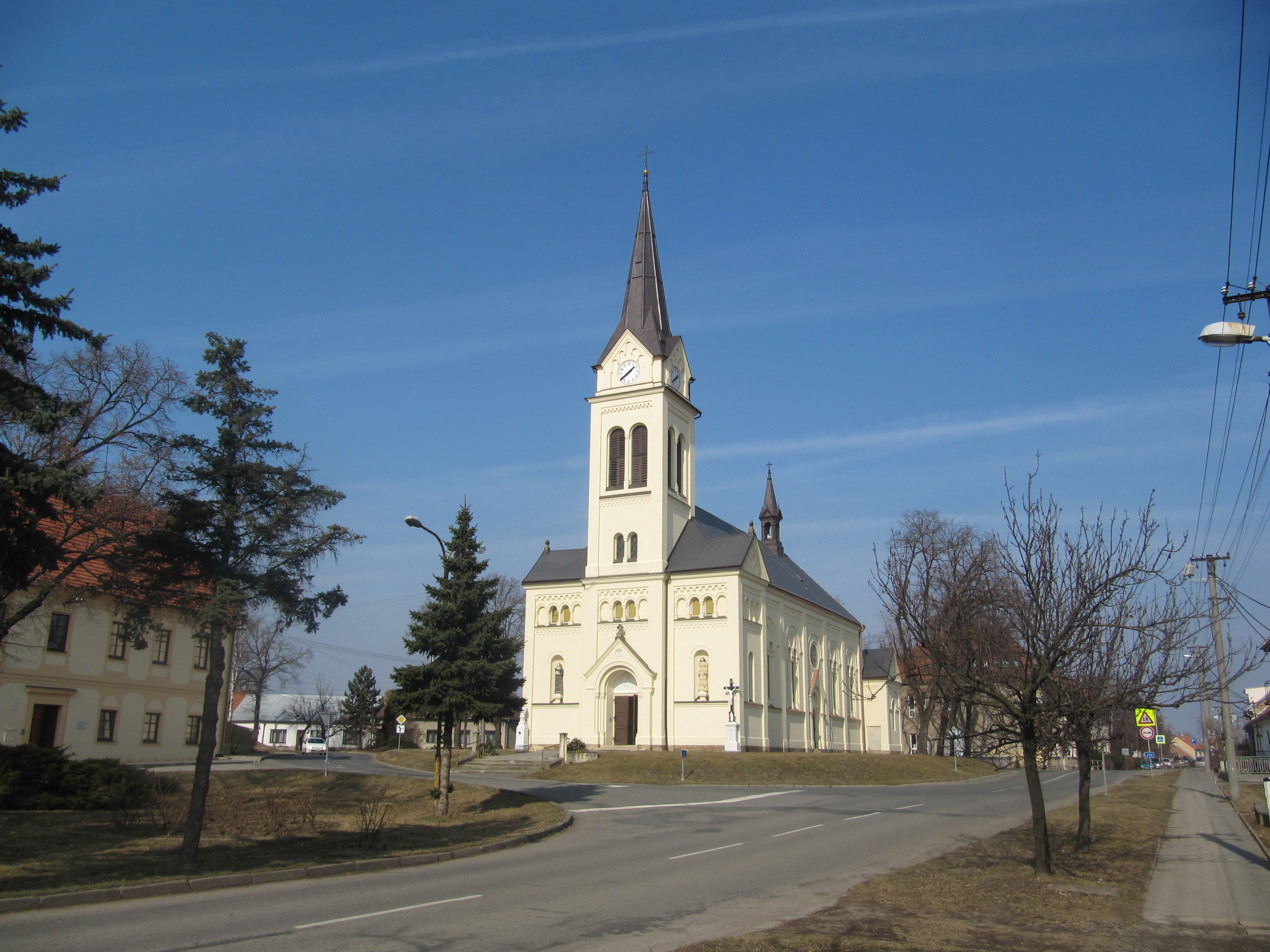
- Church of Saint Nicholas

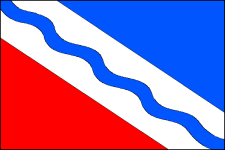
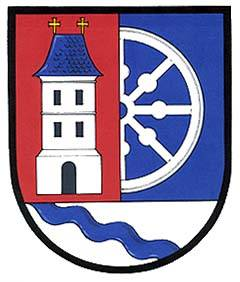
- Flag Coat of arms

- Location in the Czech Republic
- Coordinates: 49°7′3″N 16°48′13″E
- Country: Czech Republic
- Region: South Moravian
- District: Vyškov
- First mentioned: 1209

Area
  - Total: 8.25 km^{2} (3.19 sq mi)
- Elevation: 204 m (669 ft)

Population (2026-01-01)
  - Total: 1,064
  - Density: 129/km^{2} (334/sq mi)
- Time zone: UTC+1 (CET)
  - Summer (DST): UTC+2 (CEST)
- Postal code: 683 53
- Website: www.saratice.cz

Šaratice is a municipality and village in Vyškov District in the South Moravian Region of the Czech Republic. It has about 1,100 inhabitants.

Šaratice lies approximately 22 kilometres (14 mi) south-west of Vyškov, 17 km (11 mi) south-east of Brno, and 204 km (127 mi) south-east of Prague.

== History ==
The first written mention of Šaratice is from 1209.

== Demographics ==
Historical population
Year	Pop.	±%
1869	834	—
1880	878	+5.3%
1890	858	−2.3%
1900	923	+7.6%
1910	988	+7.0%
1921	1,030	+4.3%
1930	1,129	+9.6%
1950	1,055	−6.6%
1961	1,075	+1.9%
1970	970	−9.8%
1980	962	−0.8%
1991	921	−4.3%
2001	892	−3.1%
2011	1,012	+13.5%
2021	1,043	+3.1%
Source: Censuses

== Economy ==
Šaratice is known for the production of the mineral water Šaratica with laxative effects. The water is bottled since 1896.
