= Zbýšov (Vyškov District) =

- Municipality
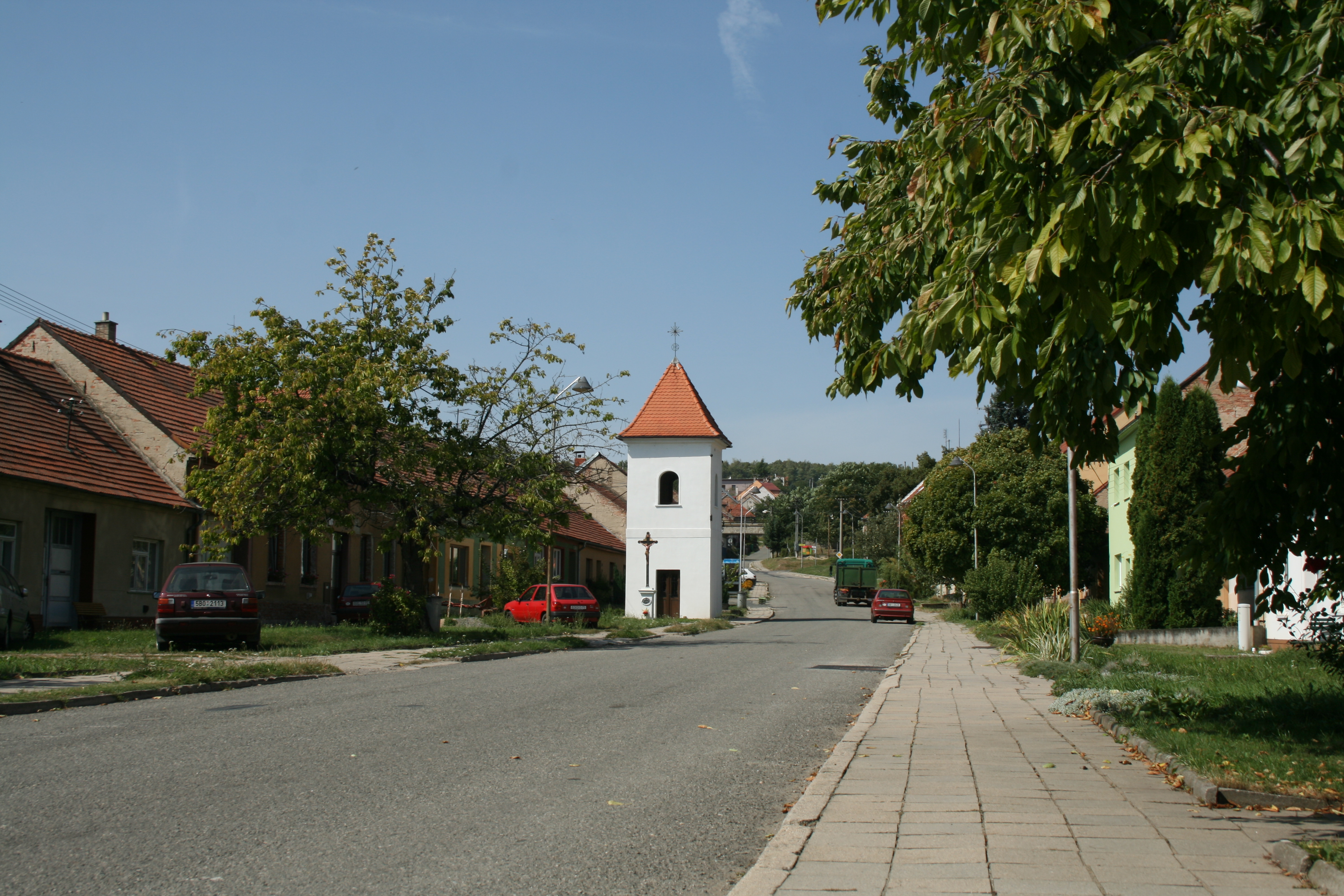
- Centre of Zbýšov with a belfry

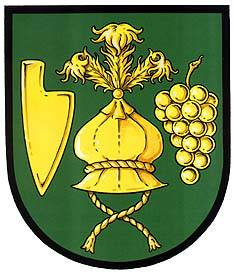
- Flag Coat of arms

- Location in the Czech Republic
- Coordinates: 49°7′53″N 16°48′20″E
- Country: Czech Republic
- Region: South Moravian
- District: Vyškov
- First mentioned: 1211

Area
  - Total: 4.79 km^{2} (1.85 sq mi)
- Elevation: 204 m (669 ft)

Population (2026-01-01)
  - Total: 720
  - Density: 150/km^{2} (390/sq mi)
- Time zone: UTC+1 (CET)
  - Summer (DST): UTC+2 (CEST)
- Postal code: 683 52
- Website: obec-zbysov.cz

Zbýšov is a municipality and village in Vyškov District in the South Moravian Region of the Czech Republic. It has about 700 inhabitants.

Zbýšov lies approximately 21 kilometres (13 mi) south-west of Vyškov, 16 km (10 mi) south-east of Brno, and 202 km (126 mi) south-east of Prague.

== Demographics ==
Historical population
Year	Pop.	±%
1869	438	—
1880	500	+14.2%
1890	564	+12.8%
1900	569	+0.9%
1910	655	+15.1%
1921	639	−2.4%
1930	641	+0.3%
1950	581	−9.4%
1961	570	−1.9%
1970	556	−2.5%
1980	471	−15.3%
1991	399	−15.3%
2001	410	+2.8%
2011	564	+37.6%
2021	720	+27.7%
Source: Censuses
