= Křenovice (Vyškov District) =

- Municipality
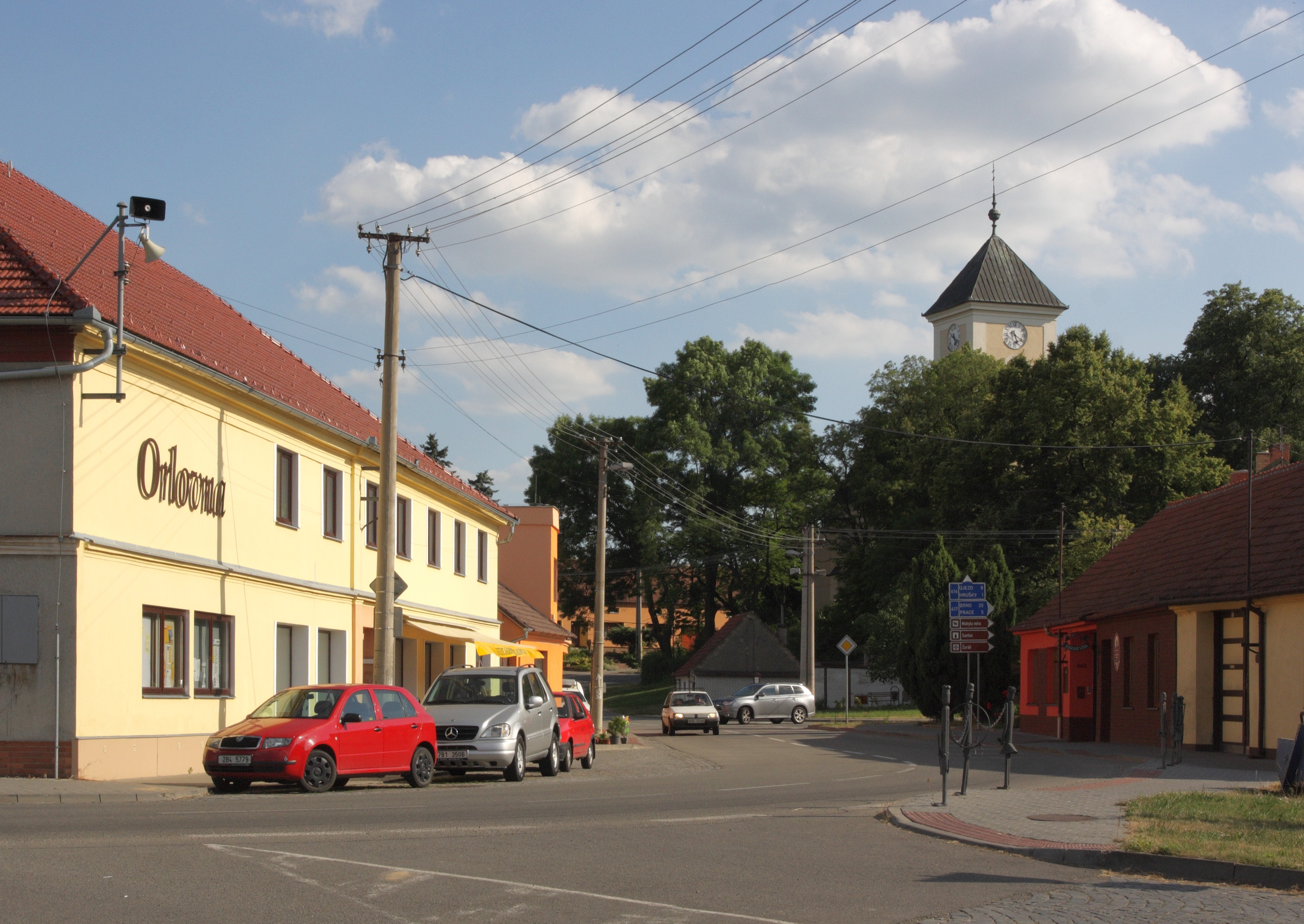
- Centre of Křenovice

- Location in the Czech Republic
- Coordinates: 49°8′32″N 16°49′46″E
- Country: Czech Republic
- Region: South Moravian
- District: Vyškov
- First mentioned: 1305

Area
  - Total: 8.85 km^{2} (3.42 sq mi)
- Elevation: 205 m (673 ft)

Population (2026-01-01)
  - Total: 2,083
  - Density: 235/km^{2} (610/sq mi)
- Time zone: UTC+1 (CET)
  - Summer (DST): UTC+2 (CEST)
- Postal code: 683 52
- Website: www.obec-krenovice.cz

Křenovice is a municipality and village in Vyškov District in the South Moravian Region of the Czech Republic. It has about 2,100 inhabitants.

== Geography ==
Křenovice is located about 19 kilometres (12 mi) southwest of Vyškov and 15 km (9 mi) east of Brno. It lies in the Dyje–Svratka Valley. The highest point is at 273 m (896 ft) above sea level. The Rakovec River flows through the municipality.

== History ==
The first written mention of Křenovice is from 1305. In the 15th century, the village was annexed to the Slavkov estate. During the Thirty Years' War, most of the village was destroyed. During the 18th century, the population grew significantly. The development of Křenovice ended in 1805, when the Battle of Austerlitz took place nearby and caused a smallpox epidemic and material damage.

== Demographics ==
Historical population

Year	Pop.	±%
1869	919	—
1880	1,068	+16.2%
1890	1,131	+5.9%
1900	1,204	+6.5%
1910	1,441	+19.7%

Year	Pop.	±%
1921	1,595	+10.7%
1930	1,972	+23.6%
1950	1,885	−4.4%
1961	1,993	+5.7%
1970	1,874	−6.0%

Year	Pop.	±%
1980	1,742	−7.0%
1991	1,725	−1.0%
2001	1,749	+1.4%
2011	1,824	+4.3%
2021	1,905	+4.4%

Source: Censuses

== Transport ==
Two different railway lines run through Křenovice. The station Křenovice dolní nádraží is located on the line Brno–Uherské Hradiště. The station Křenovice horní nádraží is the terminus and starting point of the line from/to Skalice nad Svitavou via Brno.

== Sights ==
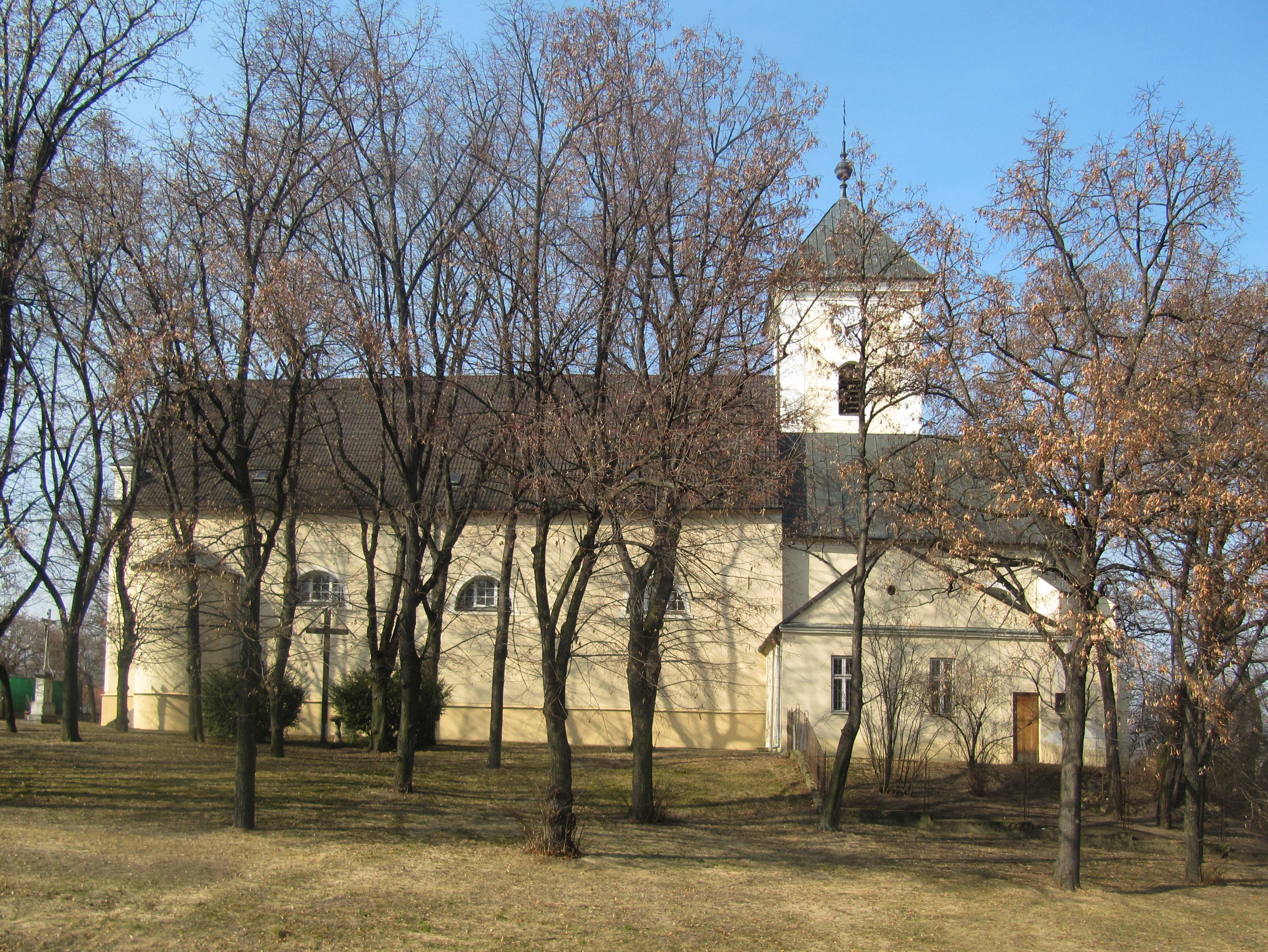
Church of Saint Lawrence

The main landmark of Křenovice is the Church of Saint Lawrence. It was originally a medieval Gothic church. In the mid-19th century, it was extended to its present form.
