= Skalice nad Svitavou =

- Municipality
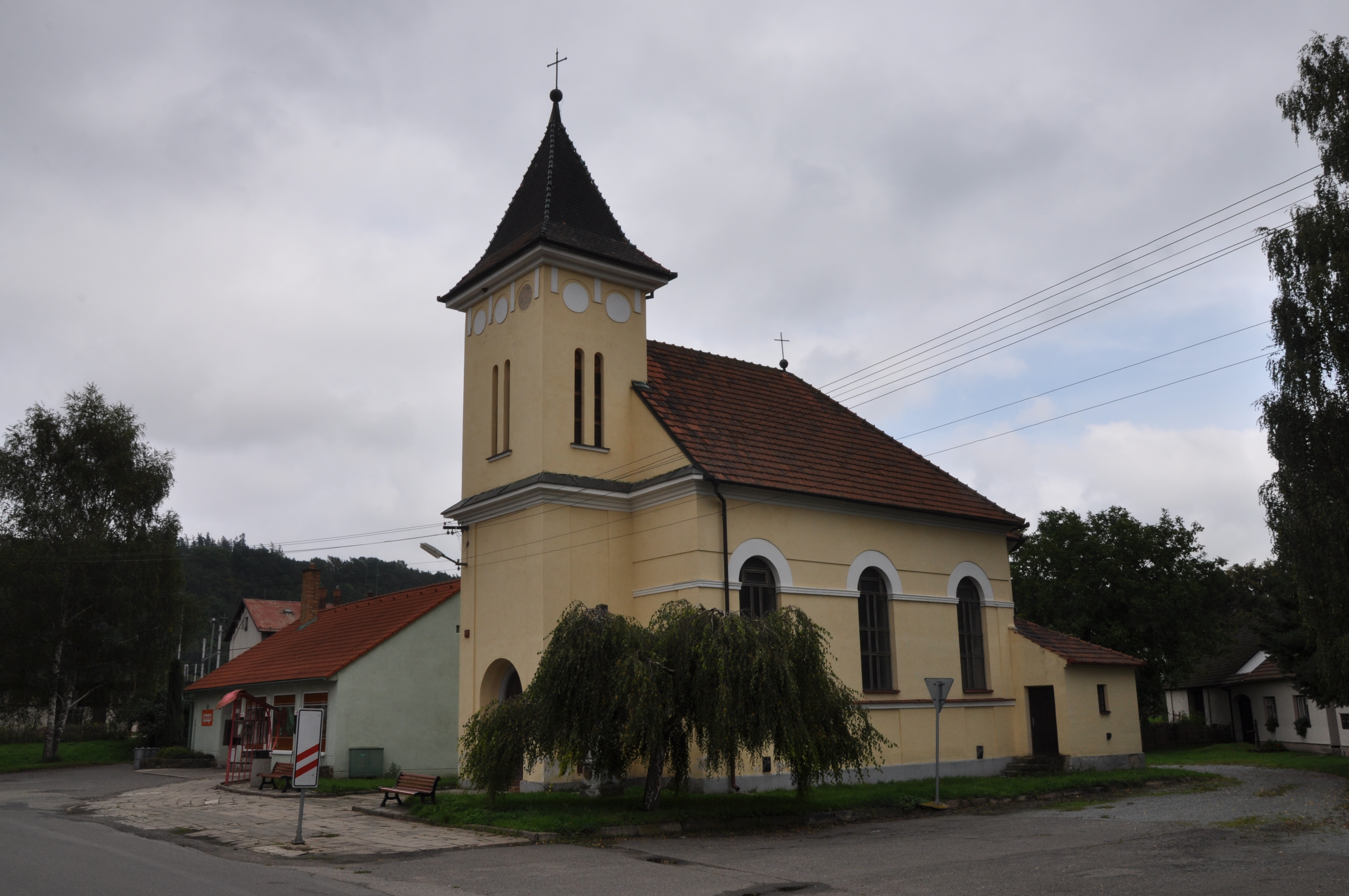
- Church of the Visitation of Our Lady

- Flag Coat of arms

- Location in the Czech Republic
- Coordinates: 49°28′52″N 16°36′13″E
- Country: Czech Republic
- Region: South Moravian
- District: Blansko
- First mentioned: 1228

Area
  - Total: 3.00 km^{2} (1.16 sq mi)
- Elevation: 330 m (1,080 ft)

Population (2026-01-01)
  - Total: 684
  - Density: 228/km^{2} (591/sq mi)
- Time zone: UTC+1 (CET)
  - Summer (DST): UTC+2 (CEST)
- Postal code: 679 01
- Website: www.skalicenadsvitavou.cz

Skalice nad Svitavou is a municipality and village in Blansko District in the South Moravian Region of the Czech Republic. It has about 700 inhabitants.

Skalice nad Svitavou lies approximately 14 kilometres (9 mi) north of Blansko, 32 km (20 mi) north of Brno, and 171 km (106 mi) south-east of Prague.

== Demographics ==
Historical population
Year	Pop.	±%
1869	257	—
1880	292	+13.6%
1890	319	+9.2%
1900	361	+13.2%
1910	403	+11.6%
1921	413	+2.5%
1930	566	+37.0%
1950	539	−4.8%
1961	546	+1.3%
1970	549	+0.5%
1980	581	+5.8%
1991	610	+5.0%
2001	609	−0.2%
2011	612	+0.5%
2021	606	−1.0%
Source: Censuses
