= Malínky =

- Municipality
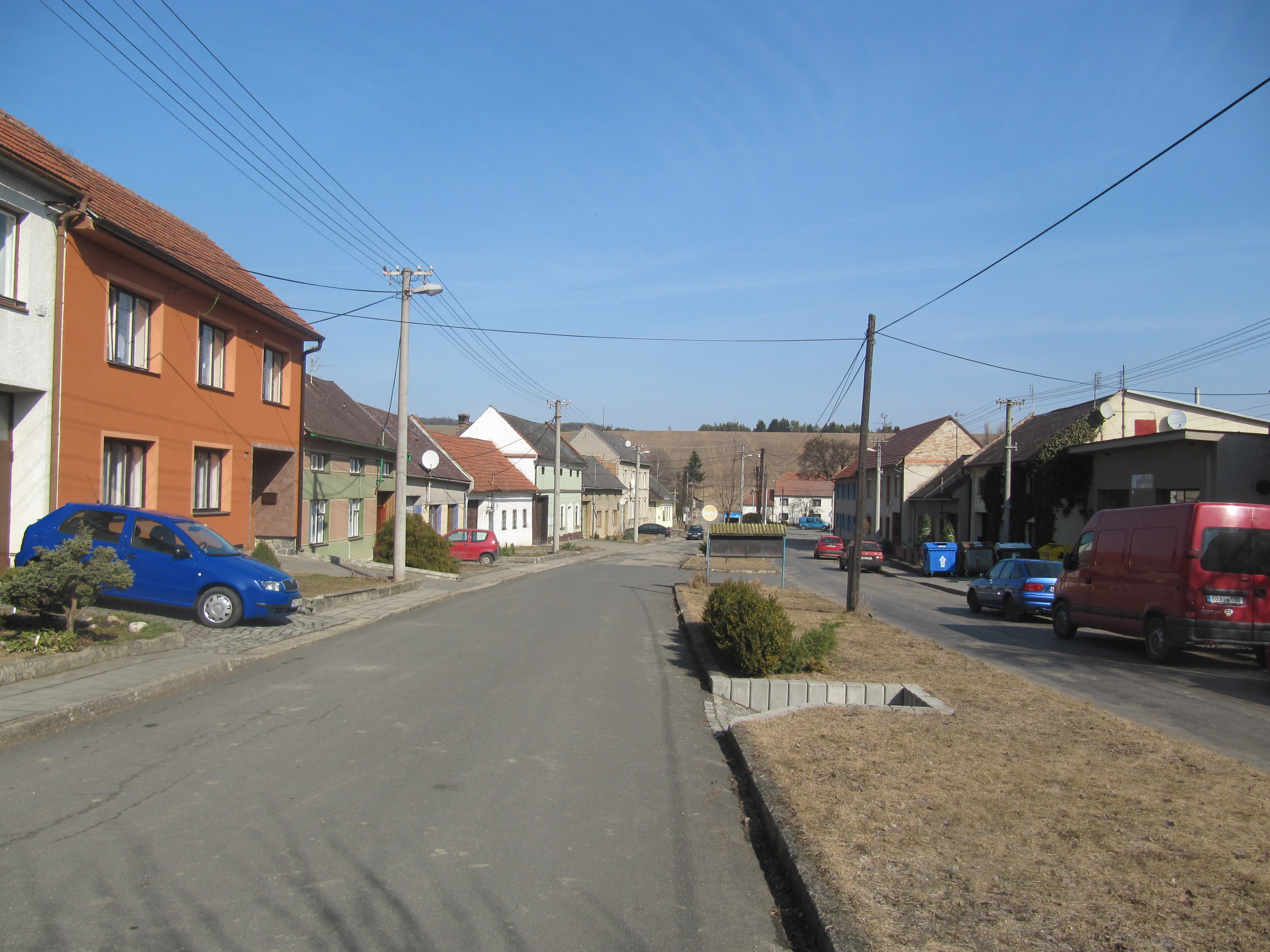
- Centre of Malínky

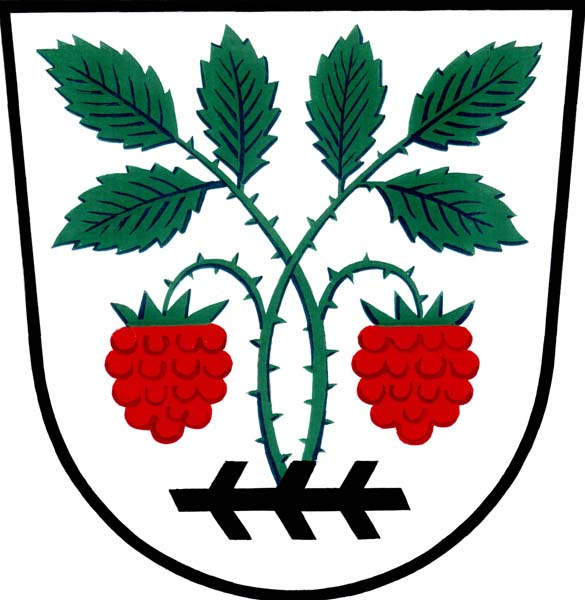
- Flag Coat of arms

- Location in the Czech Republic
- Coordinates: 49°9′34″N 17°9′37″E
- Country: Czech Republic
- Region: South Moravian
- District: Vyškov
- First mentioned: 1408

Area
  - Total: 3.41 km^{2} (1.32 sq mi)
- Elevation: 390 m (1,280 ft)

Population (2026-01-01)
  - Total: 150
  - Density: 44/km^{2} (110/sq mi)
- Time zone: UTC+1 (CET)
  - Summer (DST): UTC+2 (CEST)
- Postal code: 683 33
- Website: www.malinky.cz

Malínky is a municipality and village in Vyškov District in the South Moravian Region of the Czech Republic. It has about 200 inhabitants.

Malínky lies approximately 18 kilometres (11 mi) south-east of Vyškov, 41 km (25 mi) east of Brno, and 224 km (139 mi) south-east of Prague.

== Demographics ==
Historical population
Year	Pop.	±%
1869	286	—
1880	289	+1.0%
1890	307	+6.2%
1900	281	−8.5%
1910	298	+6.0%
1921	298	+0.0%
1930	287	−3.7%
1950	225	−21.6%
1961	222	−1.3%
1970	219	−1.4%
1980	166	−24.2%
1991	147	−11.4%
2001	142	−3.4%
2011	137	−3.5%
2021	130	−5.1%
Source: Censuses
