= Dobročkovice =

- Municipality
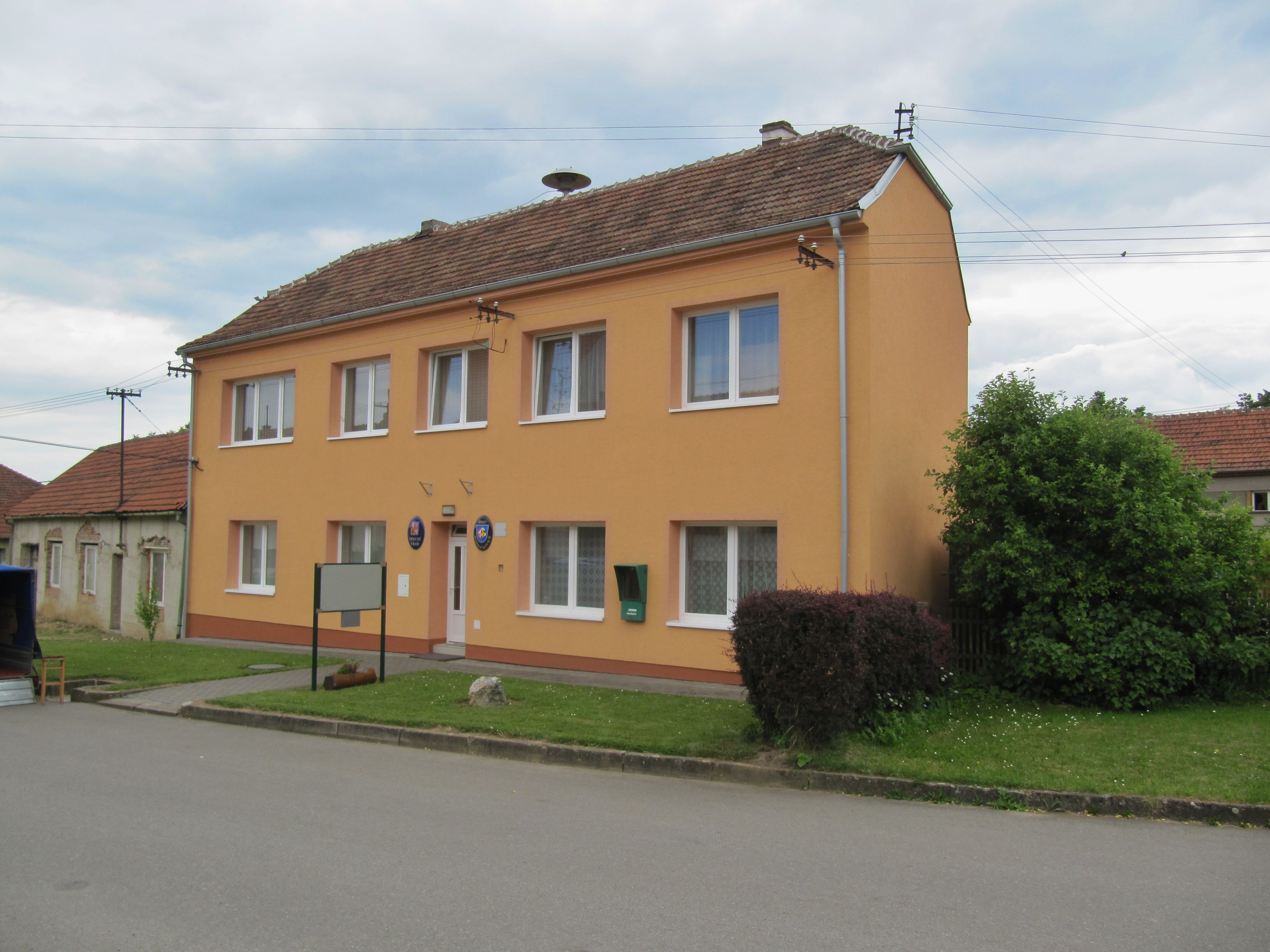
- Municipal office

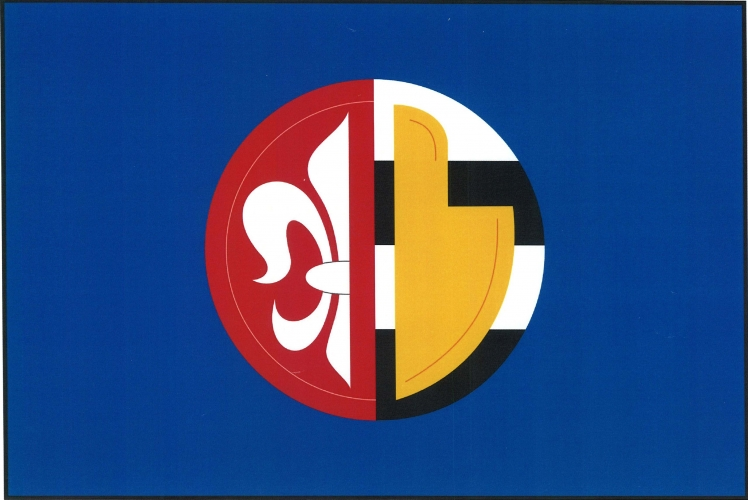
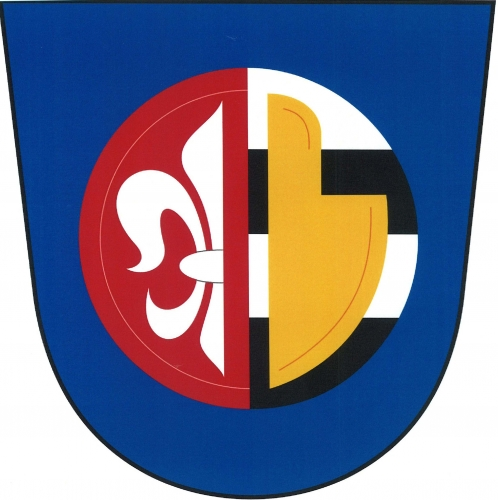
- Flag Coat of arms

- Location in the Czech Republic
- Coordinates: 49°9′47″N 17°6′32″E
- Country: Czech Republic
- Region: South Moravian
- District: Vyškov
- First mentioned: 1348

Area
  - Total: 5.03 km^{2} (1.94 sq mi)
- Elevation: 292 m (958 ft)

Population (2026-01-01)
  - Total: 237
  - Density: 47.1/km^{2} (122/sq mi)
- Time zone: UTC+1 (CET)
  - Summer (DST): UTC+2 (CEST)
- Postal code: 683 33
- Website: dobrockovice.eu

Dobročkovice is a municipality and village in Vyškov District in the South Moravian Region of the Czech Republic. It has about 200 inhabitants.

Dobročkovice lies approximately 15 kilometres (9 mi) south-east of Vyškov, 37 km (23 mi) east of Brno, and 220 km (140 mi) south-east of Prague.

== Demographics ==
Historical population
Year	Pop.	±%
1869	470	—
1880	519	+10.4%
1890	587	+13.1%
1900	529	−9.9%
1910	530	+0.2%
1921	554	+4.5%
1930	549	−0.9%
1950	427	−22.2%
1961	426	−0.2%
1970	351	−17.6%
1980	300	−14.5%
1991	222	−26.0%
2001	210	−5.4%
2011	196	−6.7%
2021	231	+17.9%
Source: Censuses
