= Letonice =

- Municipality
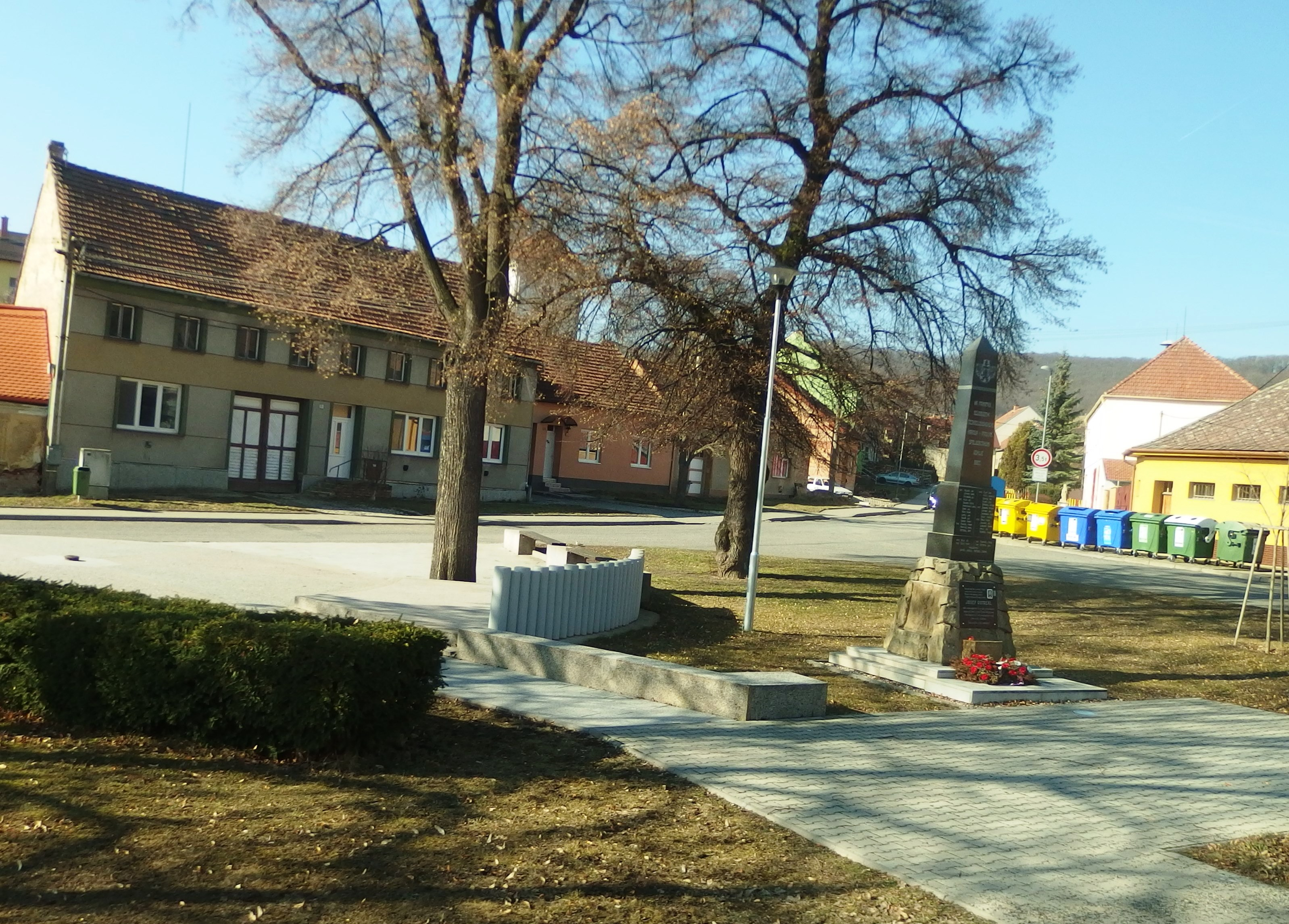
- Centre of Letonice

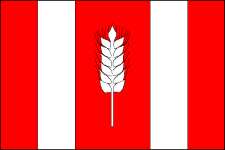
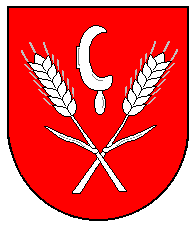
- Flag Coat of arms

- Location in the Czech Republic
- Coordinates: 49°10′38″N 16°57′33″E
- Country: Czech Republic
- Region: South Moravian
- District: Vyškov
- First mentioned: 1235

Area
  - Total: 11.01 km^{2} (4.25 sq mi)
- Elevation: 267 m (876 ft)

Population (2026-01-01)
  - Total: 1,385
  - Density: 125.8/km^{2} (325.8/sq mi)
- Time zone: UTC+1 (CET)
  - Summer (DST): UTC+2 (CEST)
- Postal code: 683 35
- Website: www.letonice.cz

Letonice is a municipality and village in Vyškov District in the South Moravian Region of the Czech Republic. It has about 1,400 inhabitants.

Letonice lies approximately 11 kilometres (7 mi) south of Vyškov, 26 km (16 mi) east of Brno, and 210 km (130 mi) south-east of Prague.

== Demographics ==
Historical population
Year	Pop.	±%
1869	739	—
1880	796	+7.7%
1890	823	+3.4%
1900	945	+14.8%
1910	1,060	+12.2%
1921	1,118	+5.5%
1930	1,312	+17.4%
1950	1,242	−5.3%
1961	1,354	+9.0%
1970	1,317	−2.7%
1980	1,345	+2.1%
1991	1,378	+2.5%
2001	1,440	+4.5%
2011	1,346	−6.5%
2021	1,313	−2.5%
Source: Censuses
