= Nížkovice =

- Municipality
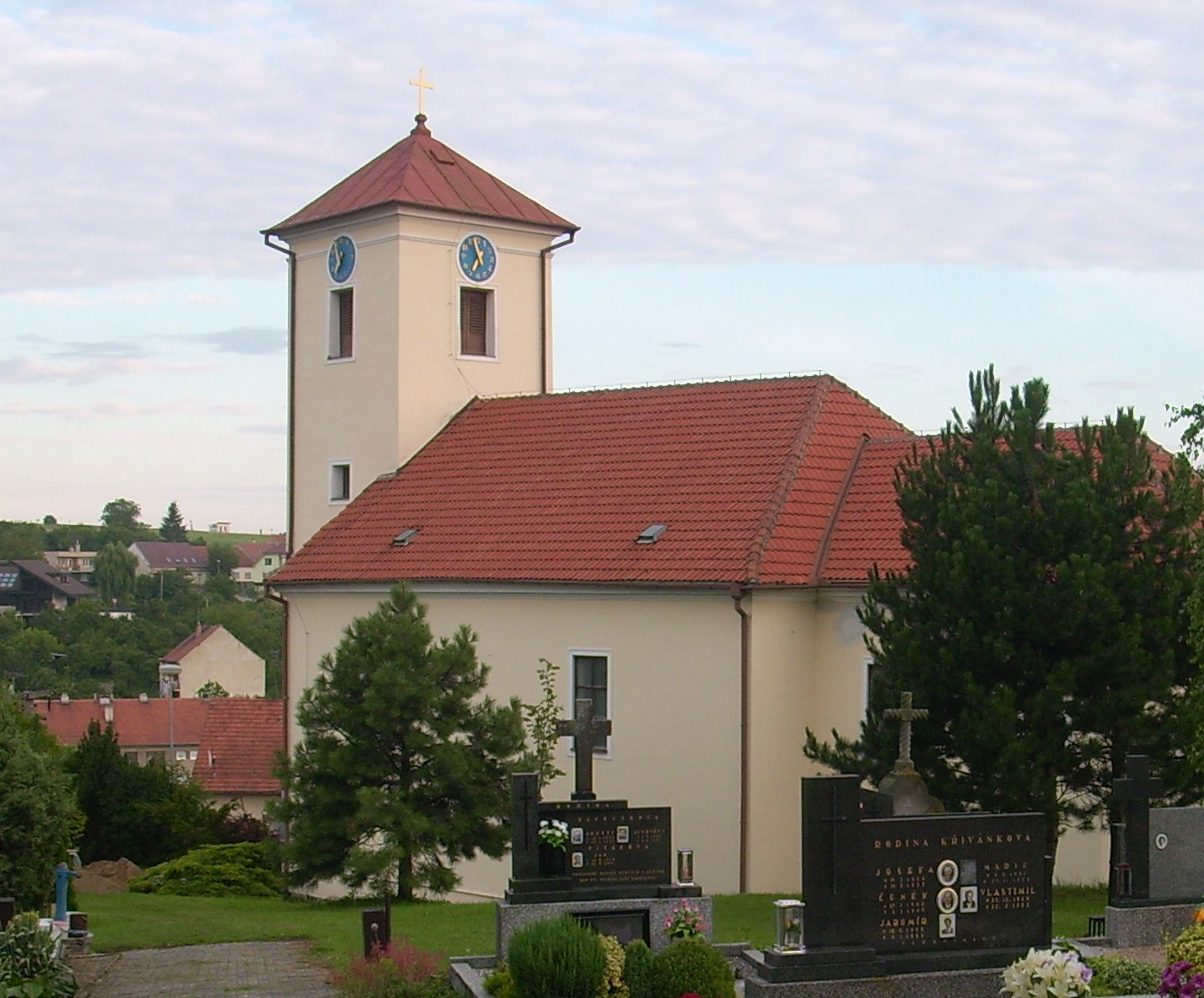
- Church of Saint Cunigunde

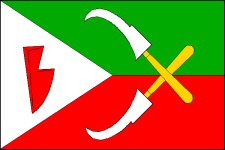
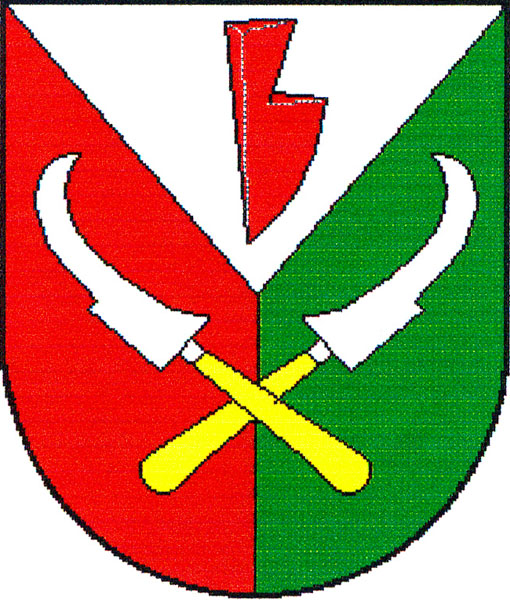
- Flag Coat of arms

- Location in the Czech Republic
- Coordinates: 49°6′34″N 16°54′6″E
- Country: Czech Republic
- Region: South Moravian
- District: Vyškov
- First mentioned: 1371

Area
  - Total: 7.03 km^{2} (2.71 sq mi)
- Elevation: 260 m (850 ft)

Population (2026-01-01)
  - Total: 817
  - Density: 116/km^{2} (301/sq mi)
- Time zone: UTC+1 (CET)
  - Summer (DST): UTC+2 (CEST)
- Postal code: 683 56
- Website: nizkovice.cz

Nížkovice is a municipality and village in Vyškov District in the South Moravian Region of the Czech Republic. It has about 800 inhabitants.

Nížkovice lies approximately 19 kilometres (12 mi) south of Vyškov, 23 km (14 mi) south-east of Brno, and 210 km (130 mi) south-east of Prague.

== Demographics ==
Historical population
Year	Pop.	±%
1869	654	—
1880	750	+14.7%
1890	825	+10.0%
1900	862	+4.5%
1910	952	+10.4%
1921	922	−3.2%
1930	971	+5.3%
1950	873	−10.1%
1961	926	+6.1%
1970	934	+0.9%
1980	820	−12.2%
1991	641	−21.8%
2001	667	+4.1%
2011	659	−1.2%
2021	750	+13.8%
Source: Censuses
