= Němčany =

- Municipality
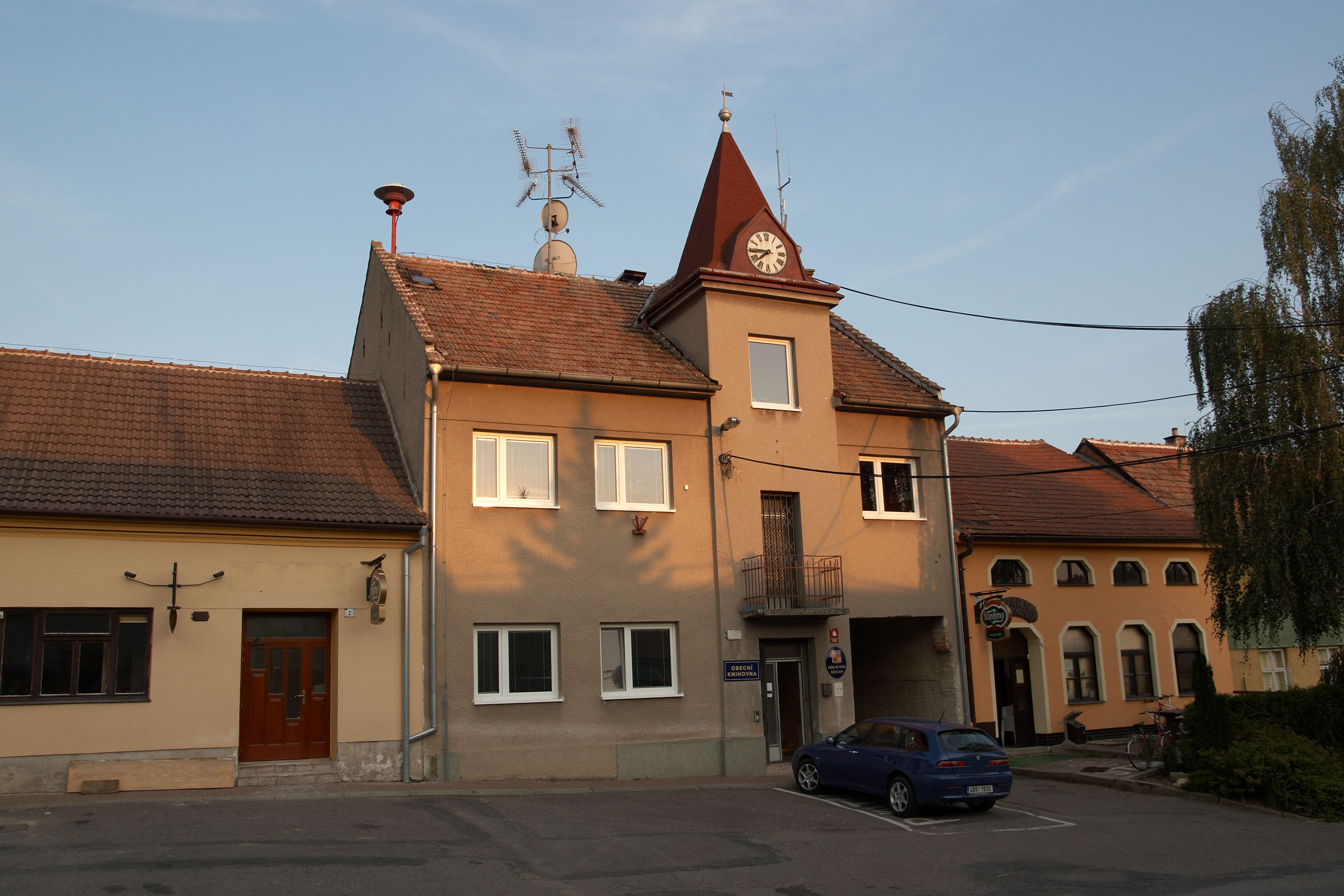
- Municipal offcice

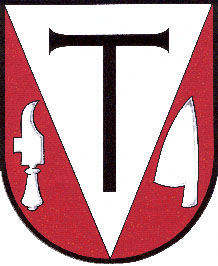
- Flag Coat of arms

- Location in the Czech Republic
- Coordinates: 49°9′52″N 16°55′10″E
- Country: Czech Republic
- Region: South Moravian
- District: Vyškov
- First mentioned: 1497

Area
  - Total: 7.00 km^{2} (2.70 sq mi)
- Elevation: 230 m (750 ft)

Population (2026-01-01)
  - Total: 799
  - Density: 114/km^{2} (296/sq mi)
- Time zone: UTC+1 (CET)
  - Summer (DST): UTC+2 (CEST)
- Postal code: 684 01
- Website: www.nemcany.cz

Němčany is a municipality and village in Vyškov District in the South Moravian Region of the Czech Republic. It has about 800 inhabitants.

Němčany lies approximately 13 kilometres (8 mi) south-west of Vyškov, 23 km (14 mi) east of Brno, and 208 km (129 mi) south-east of Prague.

== Demographics ==
Historical population
Year	Pop.	±%
1869	642	—
1880	739	+15.1%
1890	778	+5.3%
1900	845	+8.6%
1910	944	+11.7%
1921	981	+3.9%
1930	1,010	+3.0%
1950	927	−8.2%
1961	955	+3.0%
1970	861	−9.8%
1980	812	−5.7%
1991	761	−6.3%
2001	725	−4.7%
2011	736	+1.5%
2021	800	+8.7%
Source: Censuses
