= Křižanovice u Vyškova =

- Municipality
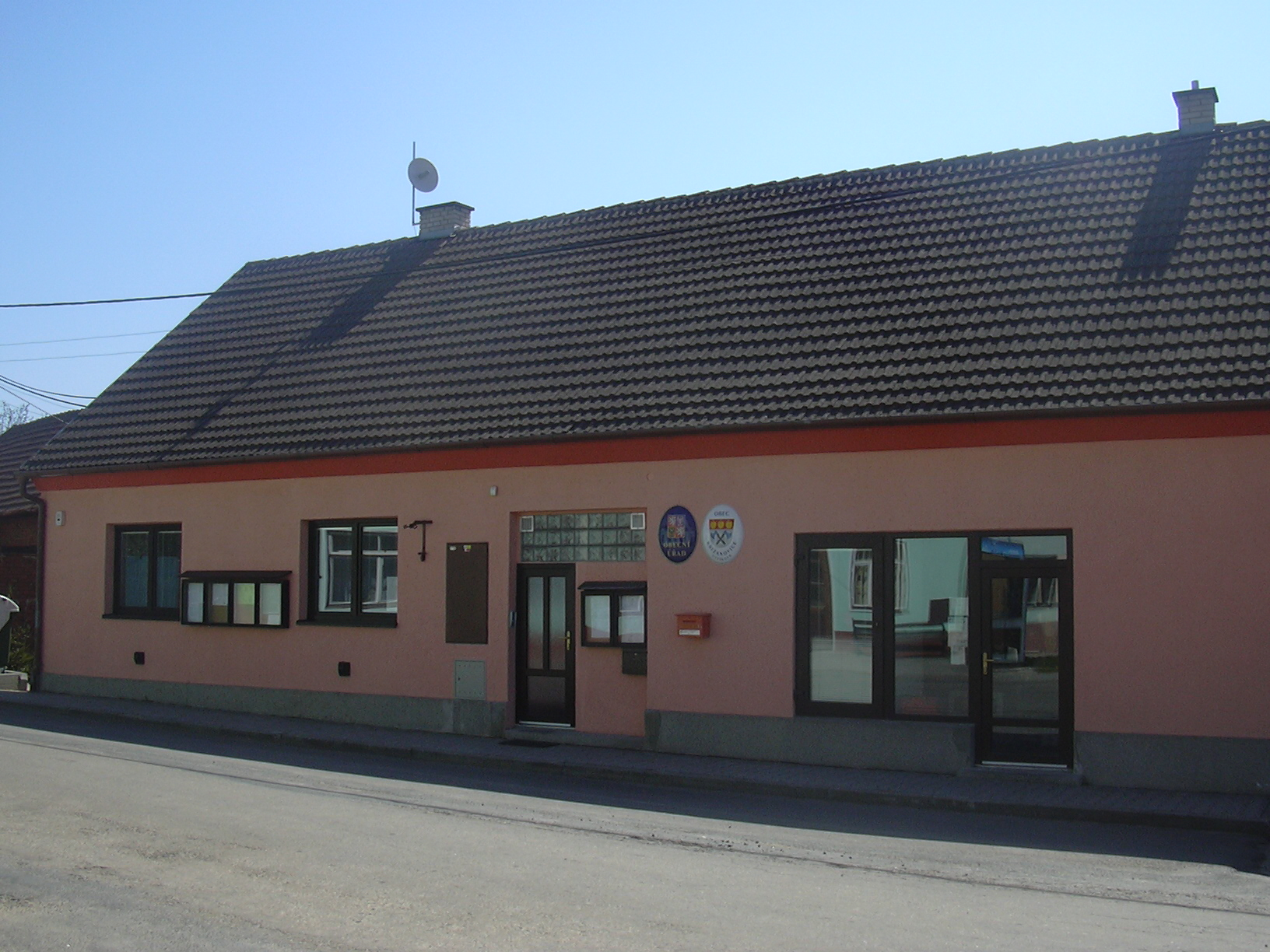
- Municipal office

- Flag Coat of arms

- Location in the Czech Republic
- Coordinates: 49°17′16″N 17°2′25″E
- Country: Czech Republic
- Region: South Moravian
- District: Vyškov
- First mentioned: 1408

Area
  - Total: 2.47 km^{2} (0.95 sq mi)
- Elevation: 257 m (843 ft)

Population (2026-01-01)
  - Total: 140
  - Density: 57/km^{2} (150/sq mi)
- Time zone: UTC+1 (CET)
  - Summer (DST): UTC+2 (CEST)
- Postal code: 682 01
- Website: www.obec-krizanovice.cz

Křižanovice u Vyškova is a municipality and village in Vyškov District in the South Moravian Region of the Czech Republic. It has about 100 inhabitants.

Křižanovice u Vyškova lies approximately 4 kilometres (2 mi) north-east of Vyškov, 33 km (21 mi) east of Brno, and 208 km (129 mi) south-east of Prague.

== Demographics ==
Historical population
Year	Pop.	±%
1869	172	—
1880	202	+17.4%
1890	214	+5.9%
1900	233	+8.9%
1910	266	+14.2%
1921	248	−6.8%
1930	268	+8.1%
1950	200	−25.4%
1961	196	−2.0%
1970	182	−7.1%
1980	148	−18.7%
1991	120	−18.9%
2001	142	+18.3%
2011	139	−2.1%
2021	140	+0.7%
Source: Censuses
