= Nemotice =

- Municipality
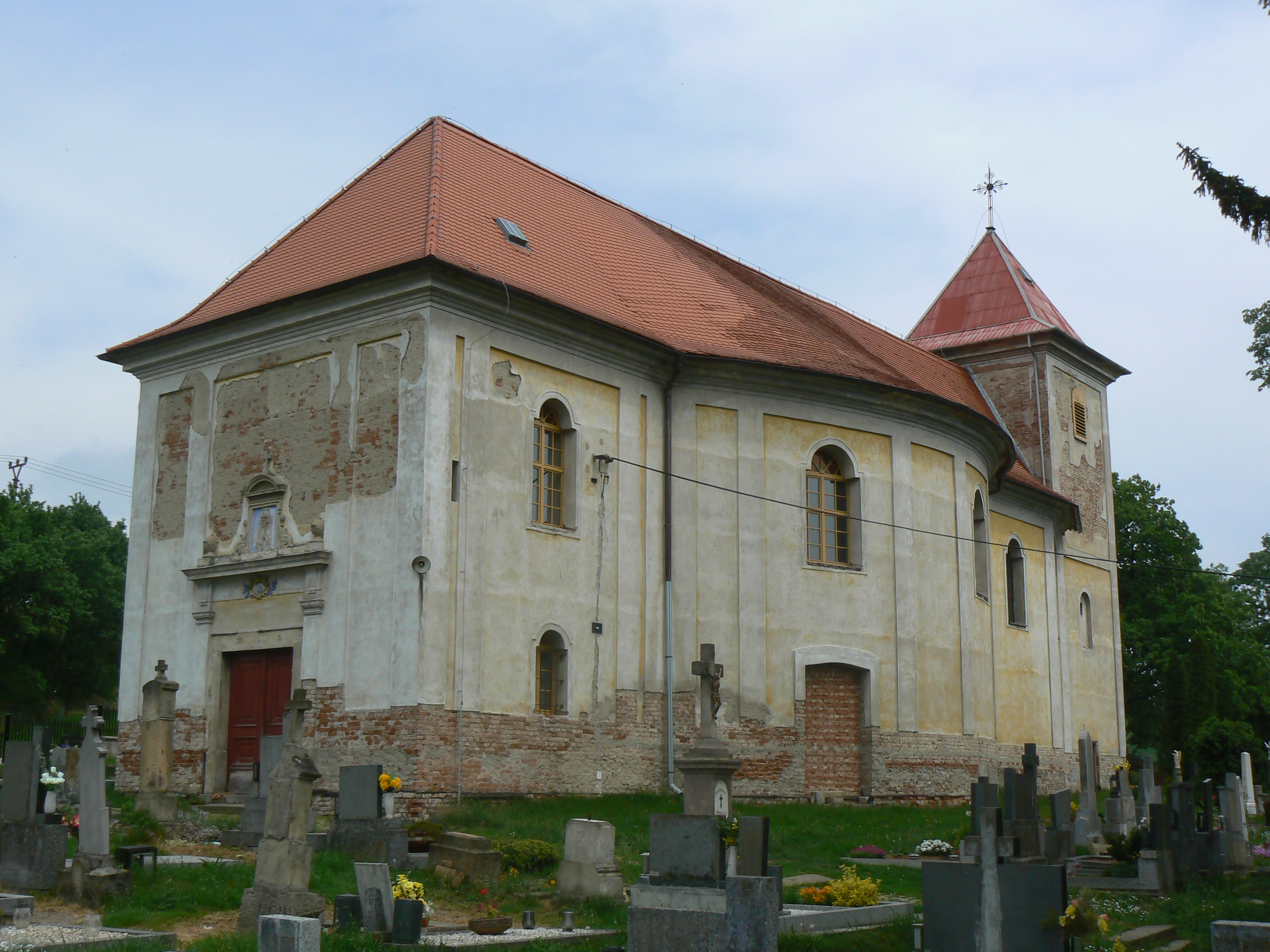
- Church of Saint Wenceslaus

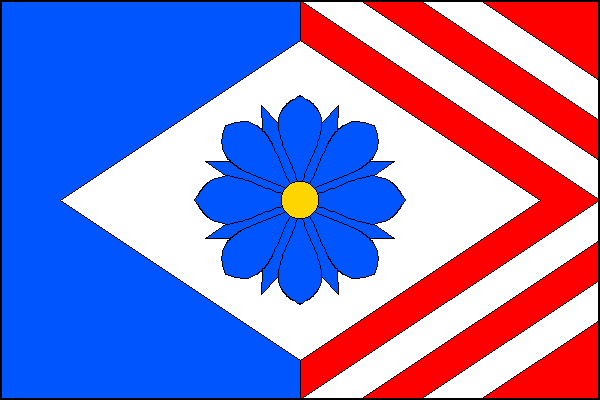
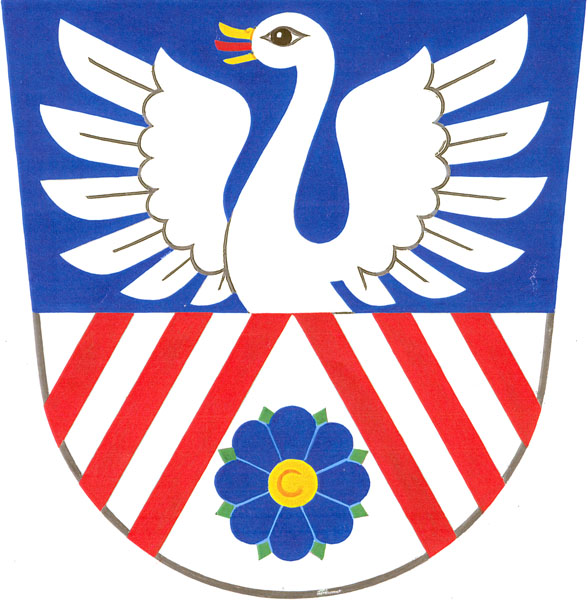
- Flag Coat of arms

- Location in the Czech Republic
- Coordinates: 49°7′47″N 17°7′30″E
- Country: Czech Republic
- Region: South Moravian
- District: Vyškov
- First mentioned: 1327

Area
  - Total: 3.68 km^{2} (1.42 sq mi)
- Elevation: 268 m (879 ft)

Population (2026-01-01)
  - Total: 429
  - Density: 117/km^{2} (302/sq mi)
- Time zone: UTC+1 (CET)
  - Summer (DST): UTC+2 (CEST)
- Postal code: 683 33
- Website: www.nemotice.cz

Nemotice is a municipality and village in Vyškov District in the South Moravian Region of the Czech Republic. It has about 400 inhabitants.

Nemotice lies approximately 19 kilometres (12 mi) south-east of Vyškov, 38 km (24 mi) east of Brno, and 223 km (139 mi) south-east of Prague.

== Demographics ==
Historical population
Year	Pop.	±%
1869	415	—
1880	518	+24.8%
1890	556	+7.3%
1900	627	+12.8%
1910	648	+3.3%
1921	658	+1.5%
1930	681	+3.5%
1950	581	−14.7%
1961	618	+6.4%
1970	553	−10.5%
1980	479	−13.4%
1991	363	−24.2%
2001	353	−2.8%
2011	373	+5.7%
2021	401	+7.5%
Source: Censuses
