= Rybníček (Vyškov District) =

- Municipality
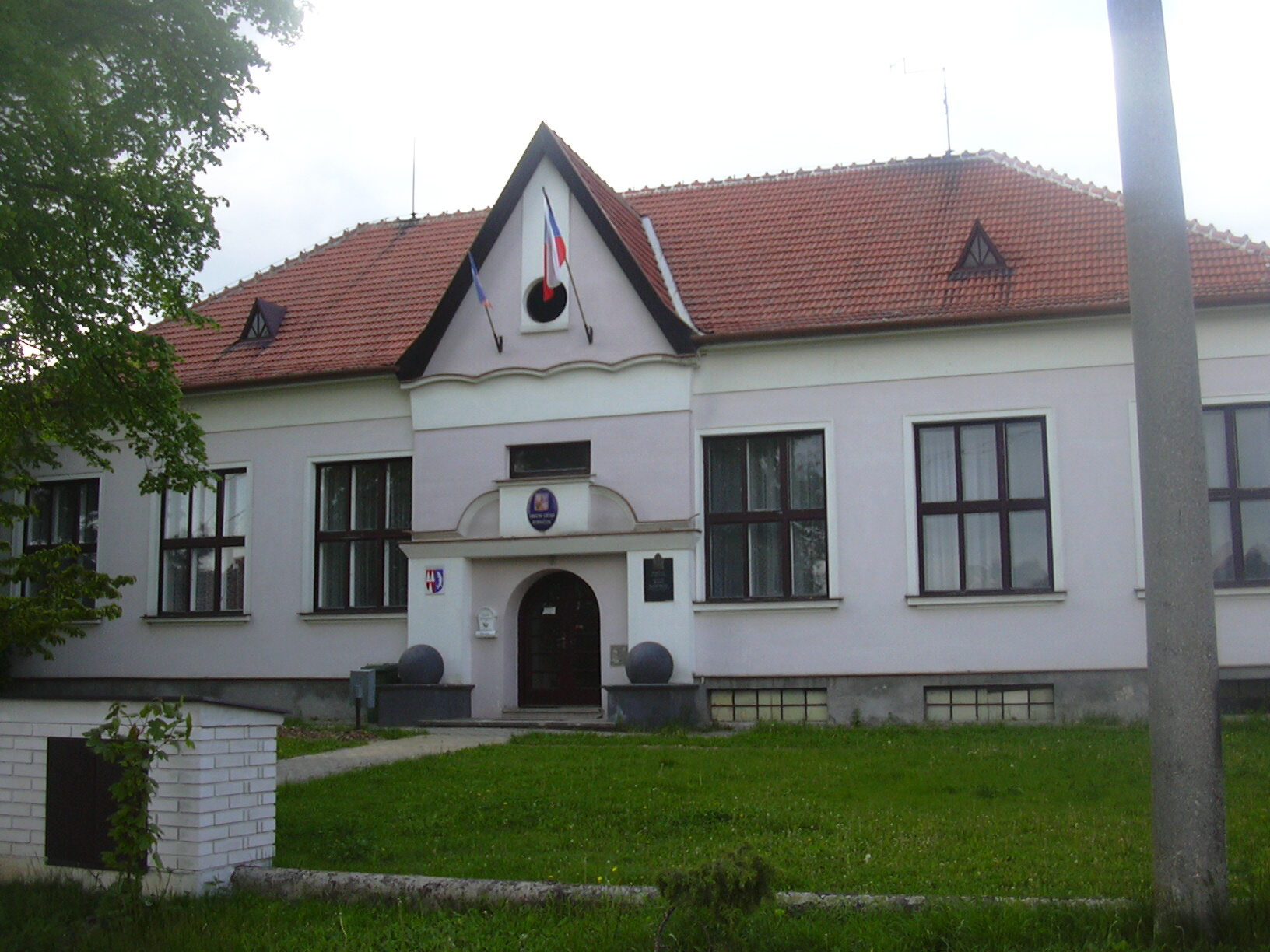
- Municipal office

- Flag Coat of arms

- Location in the Czech Republic
- Coordinates: 49°16′26″N 17°4′26″E
- Country: Czech Republic
- Region: South Moravian
- District: Vyškov
- First mentioned: 1373

Area
  - Total: 2.10 km^{2} (0.81 sq mi)
- Elevation: 236 m (774 ft)

Population (2026-01-01)
  - Total: 266
  - Density: 127/km^{2} (328/sq mi)
- Time zone: UTC+1 (CET)
  - Summer (DST): UTC+2 (CEST)
- Postal code: 682 01
- Website: www.obec-rybnicek.cz

Rybníček is a municipality and village in Vyškov District in the South Moravian Region of the Czech Republic. It has about 300 inhabitants.

Rybníček lies approximately 6 kilometres (4 mi) east of Vyškov, 35 km (22 mi) east of Brno, and 212 km (132 mi) south-east of Prague.

== Demographics ==
Historical population
Year	Pop.	±%
1869	228	—
1880	221	−3.1%
1890	225	+1.8%
1900	218	−3.1%
1910	246	+12.8%
1921	242	−1.6%
1930	241	−0.4%
1950	218	−9.5%
1961	259	+18.8%
1970	279	+7.7%
1980	266	−4.7%
1991	298	+12.0%
2001	292	−2.0%
2011	258	−11.6%
2021	266	+3.1%
Source: Censuses
