= Velešovice =

- Municipality
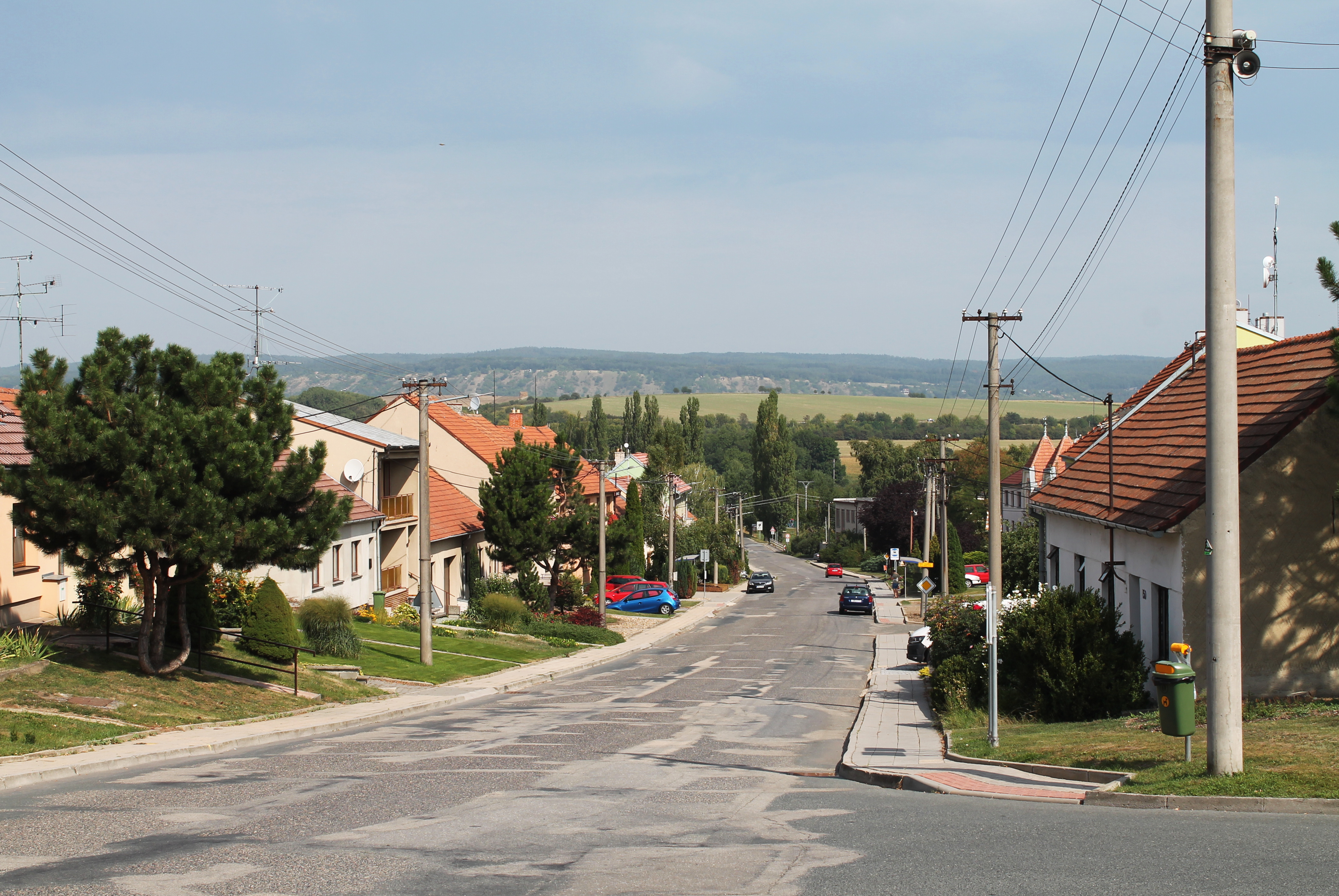
- Centre of Velešovice

- Flag Coat of arms

- Location in the Czech Republic
- Coordinates: 49°10′45″N 16°50′57″E
- Country: Czech Republic
- Region: South Moravian
- District: Vyškov
- First mentioned: 1141

Area
  - Total: 6.59 km^{2} (2.54 sq mi)
- Elevation: 228 m (748 ft)

Population (2026-01-01)
  - Total: 1,209
  - Density: 183/km^{2} (475/sq mi)
- Time zone: UTC+1 (CET)
  - Summer (DST): UTC+2 (CEST)
- Postal code: 683 01
- Website: www.velesovice.cz

Velešovice is a municipality and village in Vyškov District in the South Moravian Region of the Czech Republic. It has about 1,200 inhabitants.

Velešovice lies approximately 15 kilometres (9 mi) south-west of Vyškov, 17 km (11 mi) east of Brno, and 202 km (126 mi) south-east of Prague.

== Demographics ==
Historical population
Year	Pop.	±%
1869	761	—
1880	837	+10.0%
1890	870	+3.9%
1900	945	+8.6%
1910	1,024	+8.4%
1921	1,089	+6.3%
1930	1,153	+5.9%
1950	1,032	−10.5%
1961	1,086	+5.2%
1970	1,036	−4.6%
1980	989	−4.5%
1991	916	−7.4%
2001	915	−0.1%
2011	1,203	+31.5%
2021	1,211	+0.7%
Source: Censuses
