= Uhřice (Vyškov District) =

- Municipality
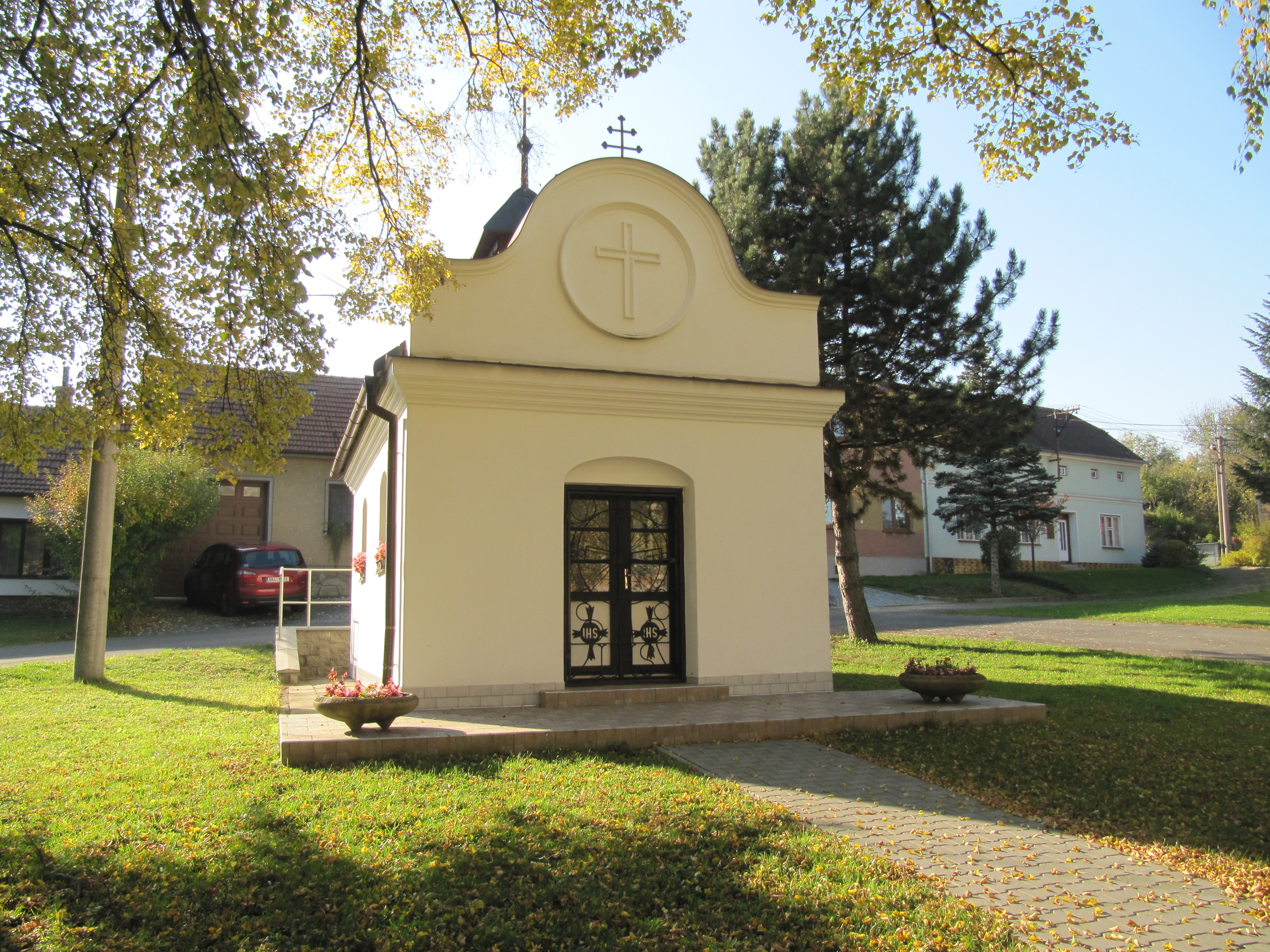
- Chapel of Saint Rosalia

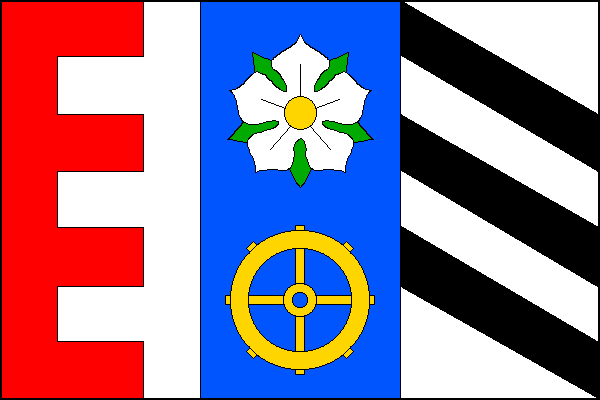
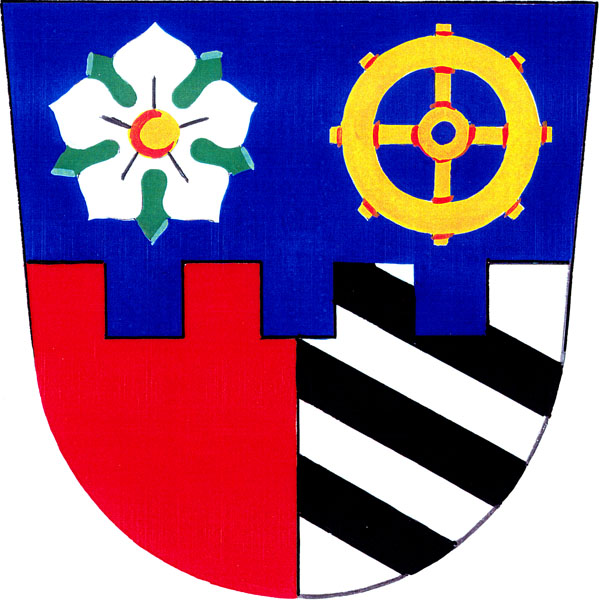
- Flag Coat of arms

- Location in the Czech Republic
- Coordinates: 49°10′21″N 17°4′43″E
- Country: Czech Republic
- Region: South Moravian
- District: Vyškov
- First mentioned: 1327

Area
  - Total: 4.39 km^{2} (1.69 sq mi)
- Elevation: 250 m (820 ft)

Population (2026-01-01)
  - Total: 266
  - Density: 60.6/km^{2} (157/sq mi)
- Time zone: UTC+1 (CET)
  - Summer (DST): UTC+2 (CEST)
- Postal code: 683 33
- Website: www.uhrice.com

Uhřice is a municipality and village in Vyškov District in the South Moravian Region of the Czech Republic. It has about 300 inhabitants.

Uhřice lies approximately 13 kilometres (8 mi) south-east of Vyškov, 34 km (21 mi) east of Brno, and 217 km (135 mi) south-east of Prague.

== Demographics ==
Historical population
Year	Pop.	±%
1869	434	—
1880	423	−2.5%
1890	436	+3.1%
1900	422	−3.2%
1910	466	+10.4%
1921	477	+2.4%
1930	451	−5.5%
1950	389	−13.7%
1961	376	−3.3%
1970	344	−8.5%
1980	318	−7.6%
1991	223	−29.9%
2001	237	+6.3%
2011	242	+2.1%
2021	242	+0.0%
Source: Censuses
