= Nemochovice =

- Municipality
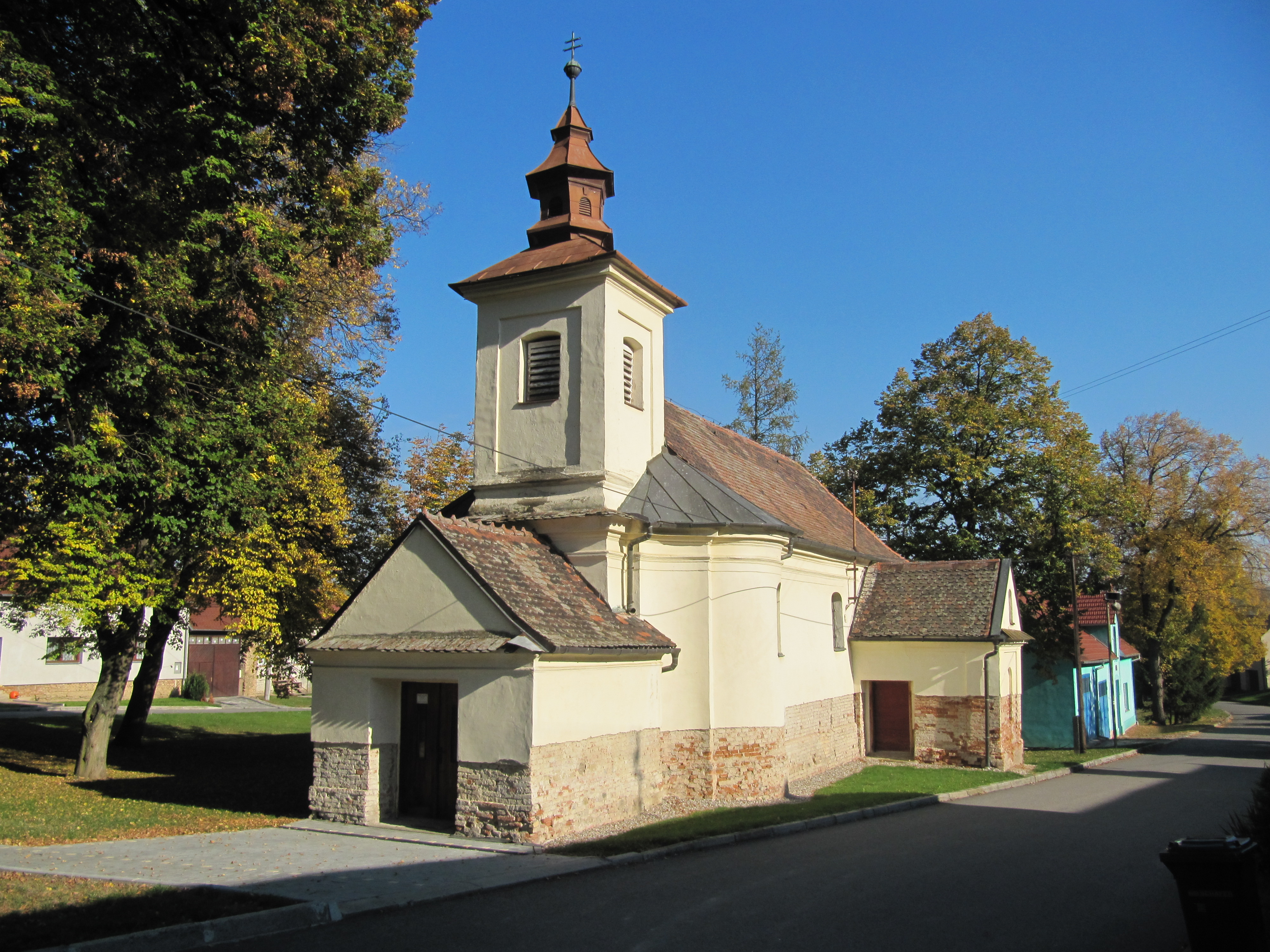
- Church of Saint Florian

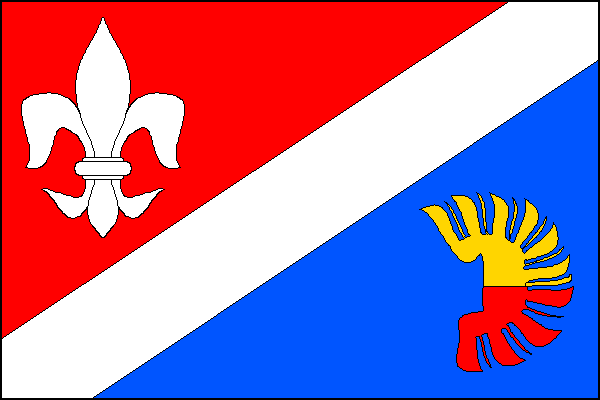
- Flag Coat of arms

- Location in the Czech Republic
- Coordinates: 49°10′50″N 17°8′6″E
- Country: Czech Republic
- Region: South Moravian
- District: Vyškov
- First mentioned: 1353

Area
  - Total: 10.59 km^{2} (4.09 sq mi)
- Elevation: 280 m (920 ft)

Population (2026-01-01)
  - Total: 334
  - Density: 31.5/km^{2} (81.7/sq mi)
- Time zone: UTC+1 (CET)
  - Summer (DST): UTC+2 (CEST)
- Postal code: 683 33
- Website: www.nemochovice.eu

Nemochovice is a municipality and village in Vyškov District in the South Moravian Region of the Czech Republic. It has about 300 inhabitants.

Nemochovice lies approximately 14 kilometres (9 mi) south-east of Vyškov, 38 km (24 mi) east of Brno, and 220 km (140 mi) south-east of Prague.

== Demographics ==
Historical population
Year	Pop.	±%
1869	578	—
1880	588	+1.7%
1890	680	+15.6%
1900	699	+2.8%
1910	713	+2.0%
1921	767	+7.6%
1930	713	−7.0%
1950	515	−27.8%
1961	489	−5.0%
1970	446	−8.8%
1980	349	−21.7%
1991	282	−19.2%
2001	291	+3.2%
2011	261	−10.3%
2021	302	+15.7%
Source: Censuses
