= Kožušice =

- Municipality
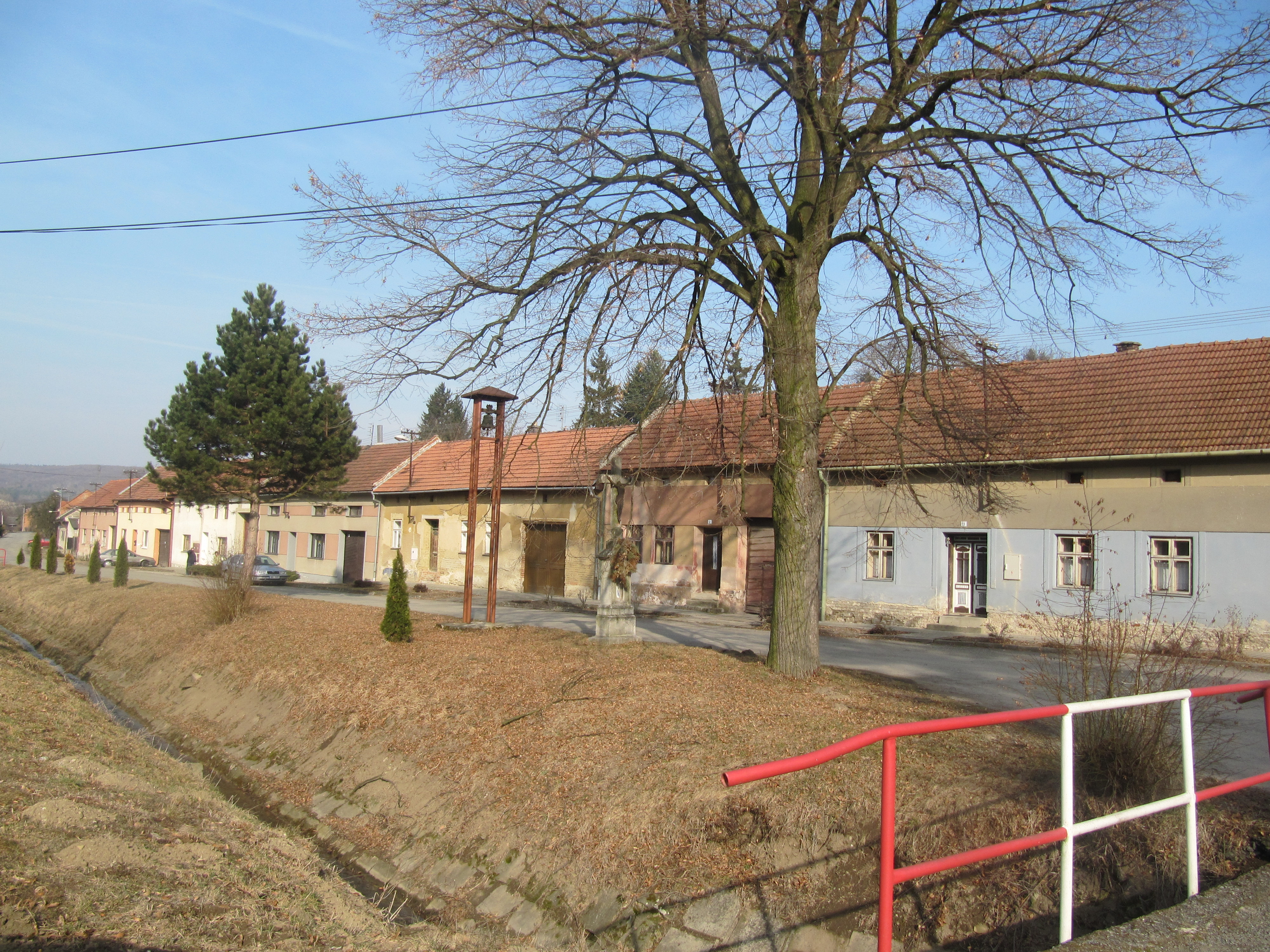
- Centre of Kožušice

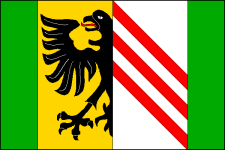
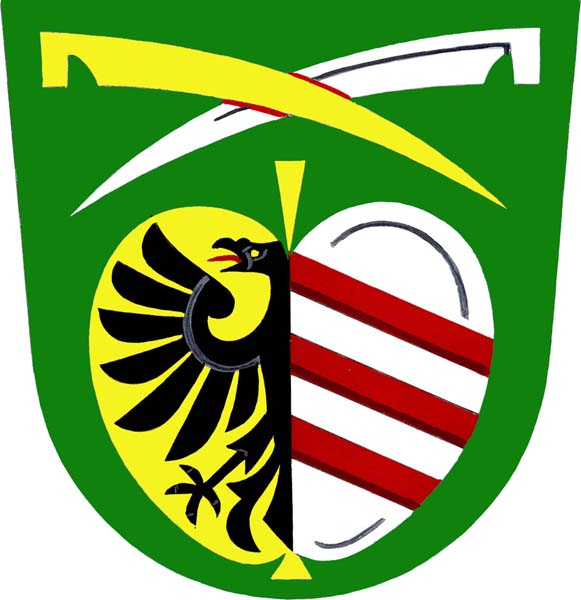
- Flag Coat of arms

- Location in the Czech Republic
- Coordinates: 49°9′18″N 17°11′5″E
- Country: Czech Republic
- Region: South Moravian
- District: Vyškov
- First mentioned: 1333

Area
  - Total: 7.18 km^{2} (2.77 sq mi)
- Elevation: 271 m (889 ft)

Population (2026-01-01)
  - Total: 112
  - Density: 15.6/km^{2} (40.4/sq mi)
- Time zone: UTC+1 (CET)
  - Summer (DST): UTC+2 (CEST)
- Postal code: 683 33
- Website: mesta.obce.cz/kozusice/

Kožušice is a municipality and village in Vyškov District in the South Moravian Region of the Czech Republic. It has about 100 inhabitants.

Kožušice lies approximately 19 kilometres (12 mi) south-east of Vyškov, 42 km (26 mi) east of Brno, and 225 km (140 mi) south-east of Prague.

== Demographics ==
Historical population
Year	Pop.	±%
1869	381	—
1880	385	+1.0%
1890	395	+2.6%
1900	425	+7.6%
1910	432	+1.6%
1921	412	−4.6%
1930	444	+7.8%
1950	336	−24.3%
1961	319	−5.1%
1970	271	−15.0%
1980	207	−23.6%
1991	135	−34.8%
2001	106	−21.5%
2011	114	+7.5%
2021	112	−1.8%
Source: Censuses
