= Nevojice =

- Municipality
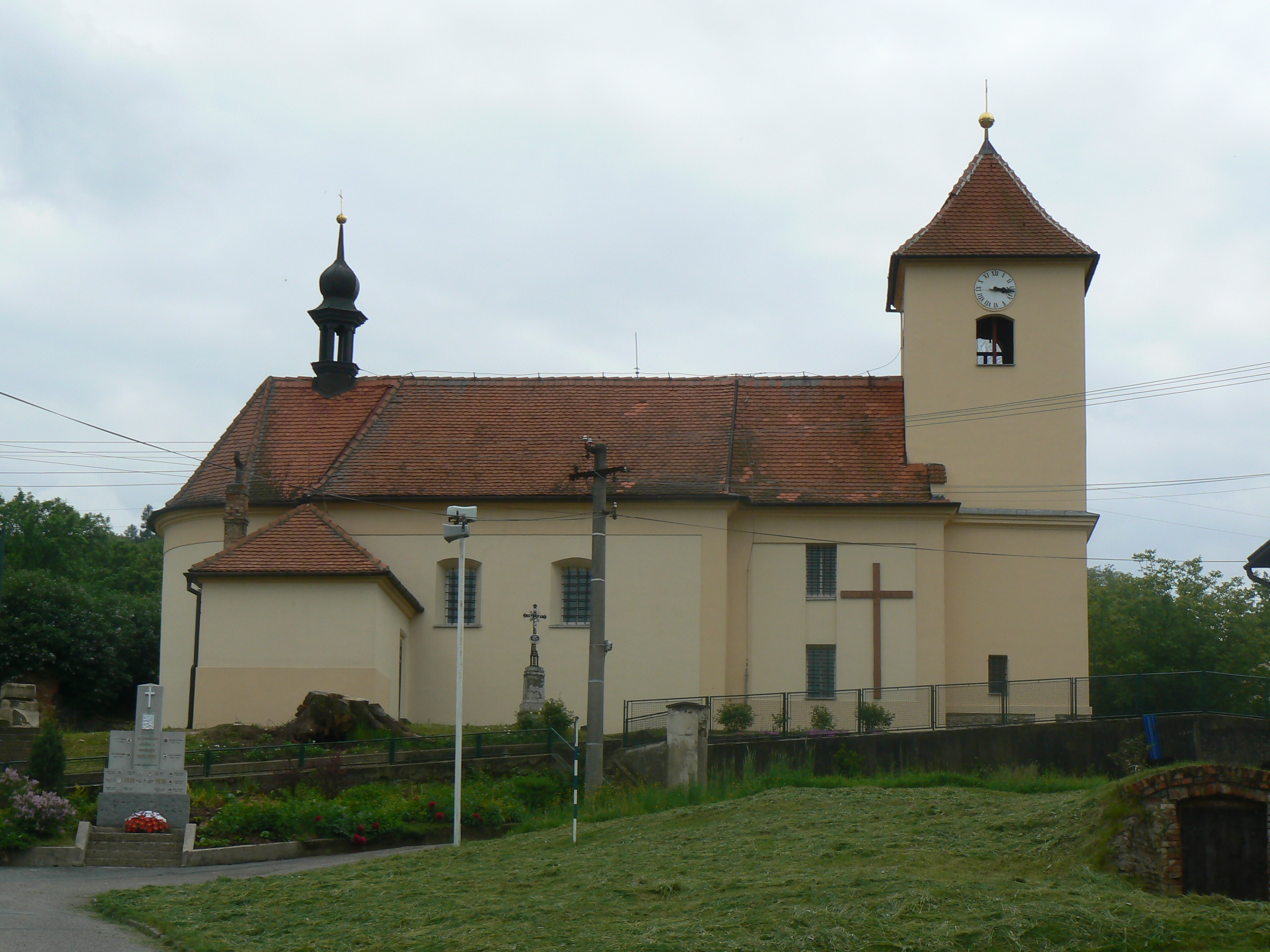
- Church of Saint Nicholas

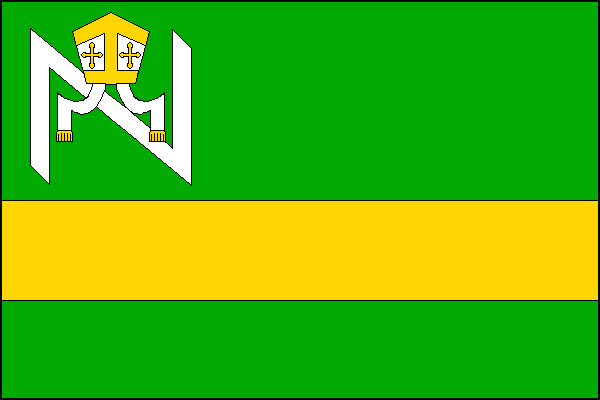
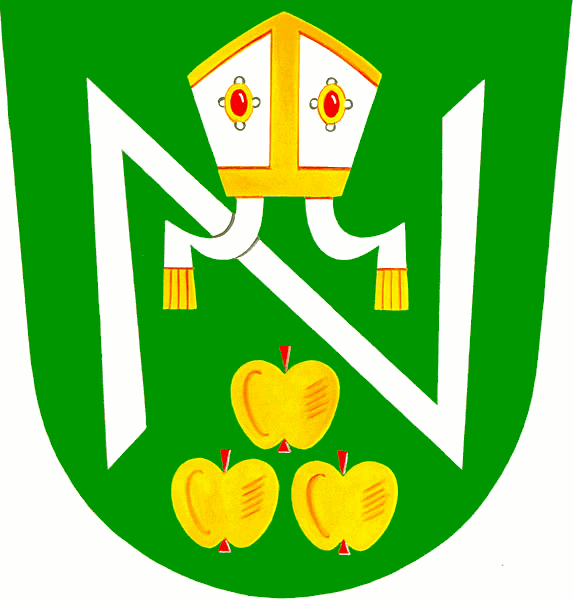
- Flag Coat of arms

- Location in the Czech Republic
- Coordinates: 49°8′7″N 17°2′59″E
- Country: Czech Republic
- Region: South Moravian
- District: Vyškov
- First mentioned: 1353

Area
  - Total: 10.61 km^{2} (4.10 sq mi)
- Elevation: 230 m (750 ft)

Population (2026-01-01)
  - Total: 420
  - Density: 40/km^{2} (100/sq mi)
- Time zone: UTC+1 (CET)
  - Summer (DST): UTC+2 (CEST)
- Postal code: 685 01
- Website: www.nevojice.cz

Nevojice is a municipality and village in Vyškov District in the South Moravian Region of the Czech Republic. It has about 400 inhabitants.

Nevojice lies approximately 17 kilometres (11 mi) south of Vyškov, 33 km (21 mi) east of Brno, and 218 km (135 mi) south-east of Prague.

== Demographics ==
Historical population
Year	Pop.	±%
1869	329	—
1880	369	+12.2%
1890	346	−6.2%
1900	352	+1.7%
1910	362	+2.8%
1921	394	+8.8%
1930	404	+2.5%
1950	358	−11.4%
1961	403	+12.6%
1970	328	−18.6%
1980	343	+4.6%
1991	361	+5.2%
2001	403	+11.6%
2011	409	+1.5%
2021	408	−0.2%
Source: Censuses
