= Drysice =

- Municipality
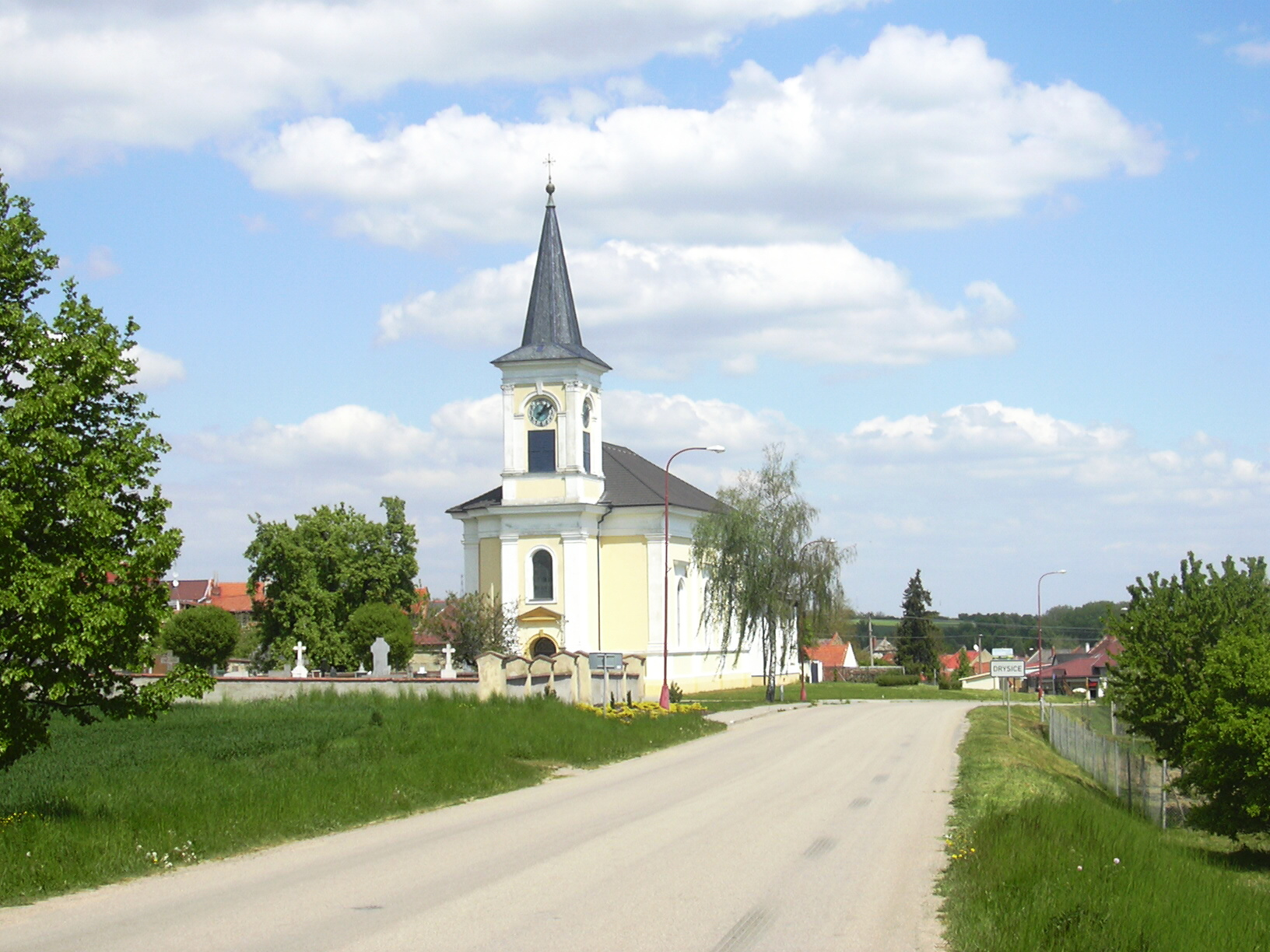
- Church of the Nativity of the Virgin Mary

- Flag Coat of arms

- Location in the Czech Republic
- Coordinates: 49°20′4″N 17°3′28″E
- Country: Czech Republic
- Region: South Moravian
- District: Vyškov
- First mentioned: 1201

Area
  - Total: 7.89 km^{2} (3.05 sq mi)
- Elevation: 275 m (902 ft)

Population (2026-01-01)
  - Total: 611
  - Density: 77.4/km^{2} (201/sq mi)
- Time zone: UTC+1 (CET)
  - Summer (DST): UTC+2 (CEST)
- Postal code: 683 22
- Website: www.obecdrysice.cz

Drysice is a municipality and village in Vyškov District in the South Moravian Region of the Czech Republic. It has about 600 inhabitants.

Drysice lies approximately 10 kilometres (6 mi) north-east of Vyškov, 36 km (22 mi) north-east of Brno, and 208 km (129 mi) south-east of Prague.

== Demographics ==
Historical population
Year	Pop.	±%
1869	577	—
1880	670	+16.1%
1890	646	−3.6%
1900	758	+17.3%
1910	837	+10.4%
1921	788	−5.9%
1930	781	−0.9%
1950	544	−30.3%
1961	584	+7.4%
1970	535	−8.4%
1980	530	−0.9%
1991	504	−4.9%
2001	528	+4.8%
2011	579	+9.7%
2021	619	+6.9%
Source: Censuses
