= Dětkovice (Vyškov District) =

- Municipality
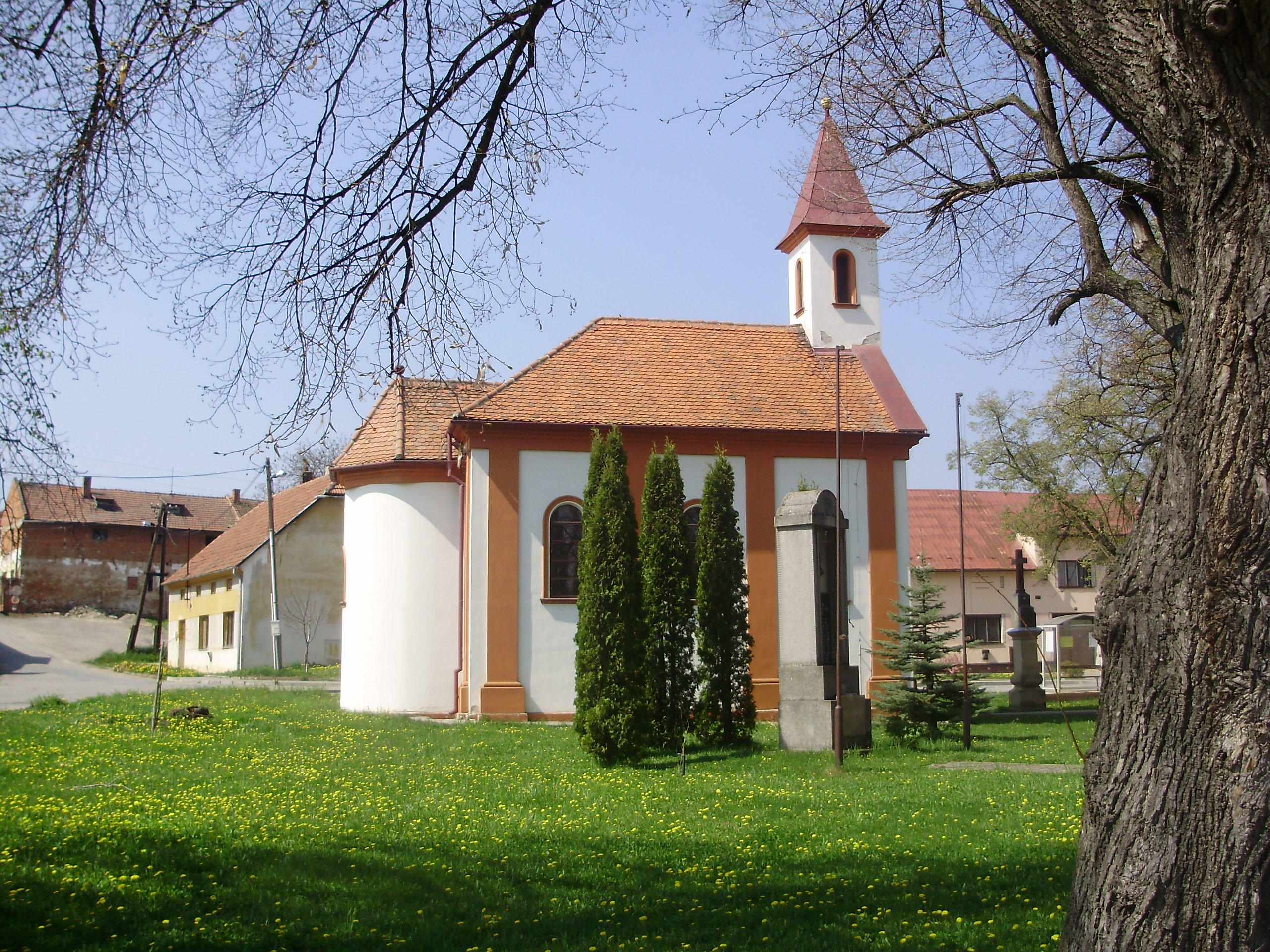
- Chapel of Saint Florian

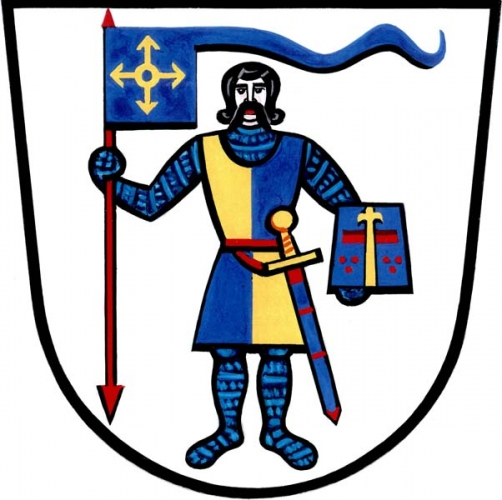
- Flag Coat of arms

- Location in the Czech Republic
- Coordinates: 49°16′22″N 17°8′39″E
- Country: Czech Republic
- Region: South Moravian
- District: Vyškov
- First mentioned: 1311

Area
  - Total: 4.97 km^{2} (1.92 sq mi)
- Elevation: 274 m (899 ft)

Population (2026-01-01)
  - Total: 285
  - Density: 57.3/km^{2} (149/sq mi)
- Time zone: UTC+1 (CET)
  - Summer (DST): UTC+2 (CEST)
- Postal code: 683 23
- Website: www.obecdetkovice.cz

Dětkovice is a municipality and village in Vyškov District in the South Moravian Region of the Czech Republic. It has about 300 inhabitants.

Dětkovice lies approximately 12 kilometres (7 mi) east of Vyškov, 40 km (25 mi) east of Brno, and 217 km (135 mi) south-east of Prague.

== Demographics ==
Historical population
Year	Pop.	±%
1869	342	—
1880	376	+9.9%
1890	375	−0.3%
1900	424	+13.1%
1910	439	+3.5%
1921	450	+2.5%
1930	466	+3.6%
1950	368	−21.0%
1961	379	+3.0%
1970	345	−9.0%
1980	303	−12.2%
1991	247	−18.5%
2001	258	+4.5%
2011	273	+5.8%
2021	283	+3.7%
Source: Censuses
