= Podivice =

- Municipality
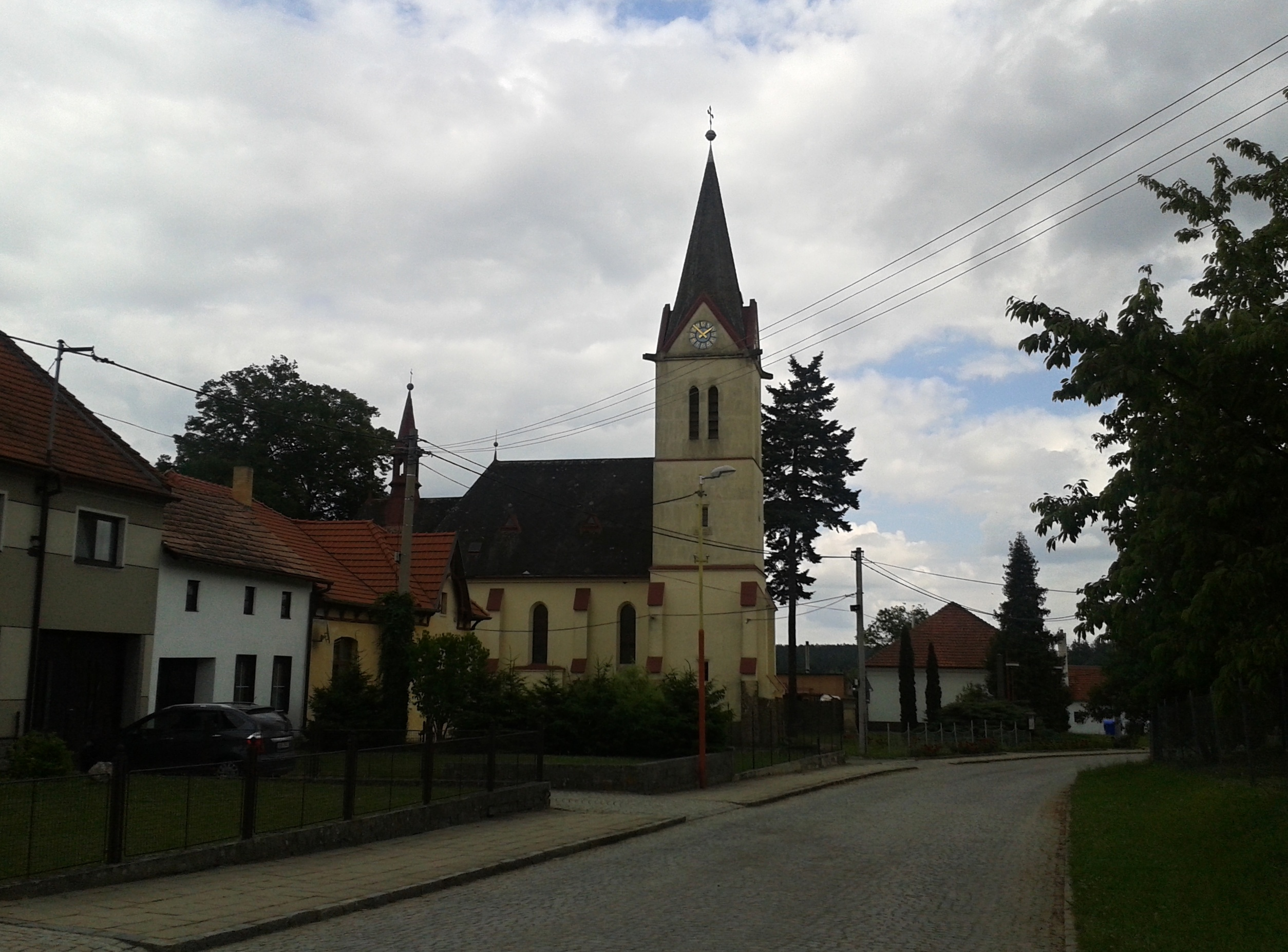
- Church of Saints Cyril and Methodius

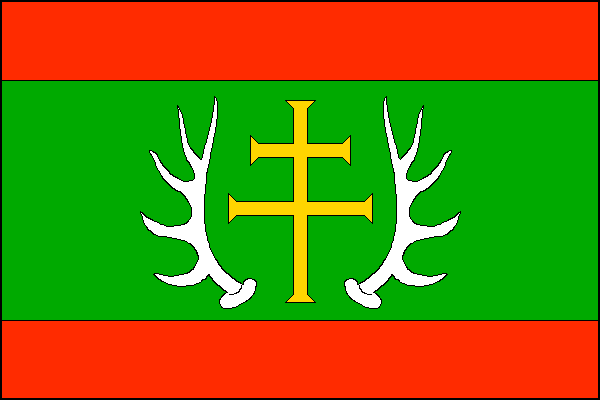
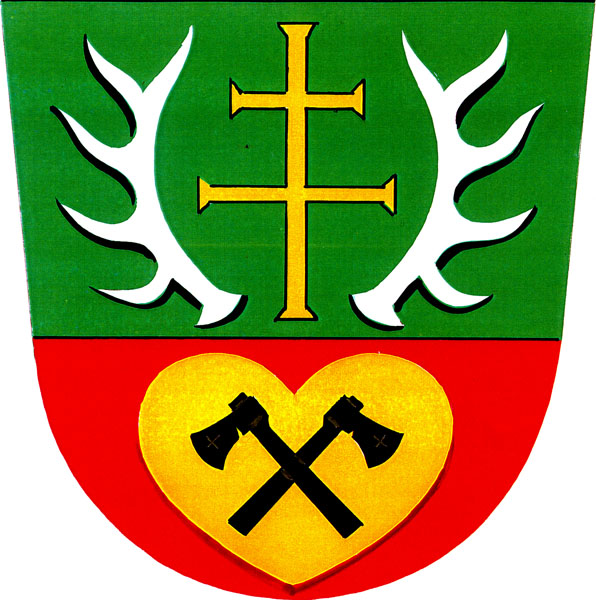
- Flag Coat of arms

- Location in the Czech Republic
- Coordinates: 49°21′57″N 17°0′39″E
- Country: Czech Republic
- Region: South Moravian
- District: Vyškov
- First mentioned: 1143

Area
  - Total: 3.58 km^{2} (1.38 sq mi)
- Elevation: 500 m (1,600 ft)

Population (2026-01-01)
  - Total: 166
  - Density: 46.4/km^{2} (120/sq mi)
- Time zone: UTC+1 (CET)
  - Summer (DST): UTC+2 (CEST)
- Postal code: 683 21
- Website: www.podivice.eu

Podivice is a municipality and village in Vyškov District in the South Moravian Region of the Czech Republic. It has about 200 inhabitants.

Podivice lies approximately 12 kilometres (7 mi) north of Vyškov, 35 km (22 mi) north-east of Brno, and 203 km (126 mi) south-east of Prague.

== Demographics ==
Historical population
Year	Pop.	±%
1869	377	—
1880	422	+11.9%
1890	423	+0.2%
1900	419	−0.9%
1910	454	+8.4%
1921	427	−5.9%
1930	406	−4.9%
1950	234	−42.4%
1961	275	+17.5%
1970	232	−15.6%
1980	215	−7.3%
1991	199	−7.4%
2001	187	−6.0%
2011	192	+2.7%
2021	169	−12.0%
Source: Censuses
