= Studnice (Vyškov District) =

- Municipality
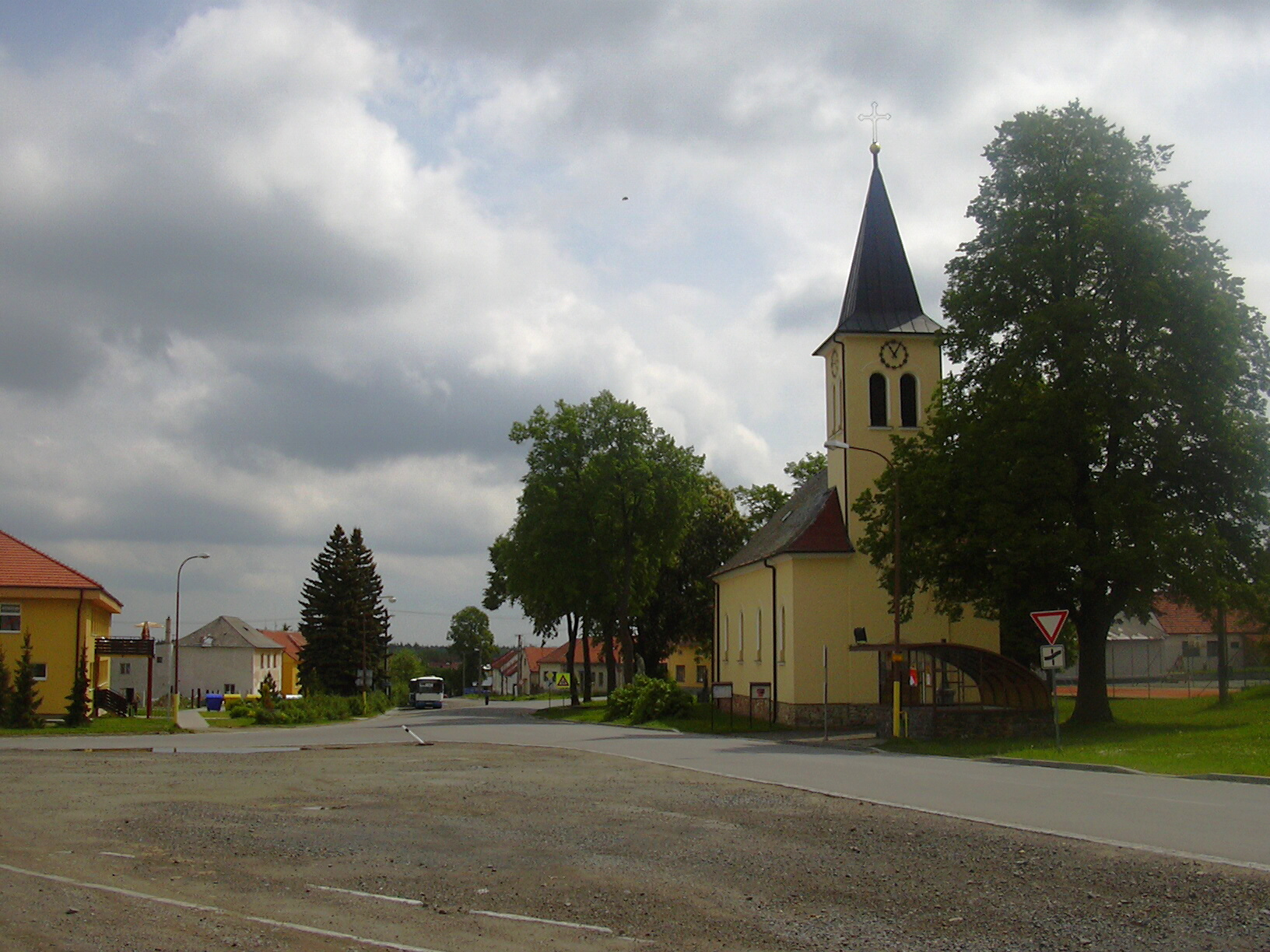
- Centre of Studnice

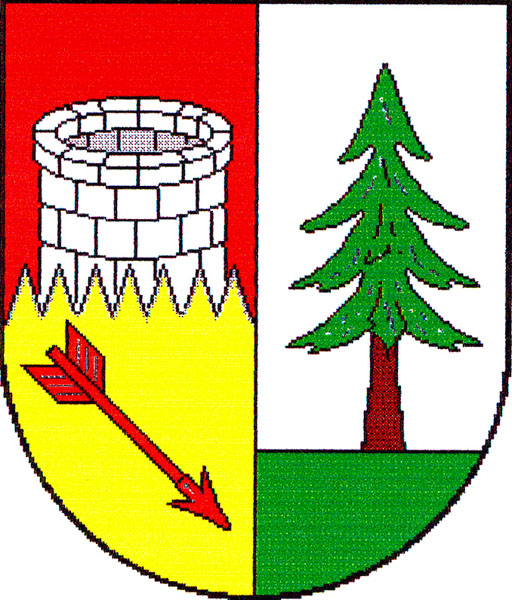
- Flag Coat of arms

- Location in the Czech Republic
- Coordinates: 49°22′32″N 16°52′52″E
- Country: Czech Republic
- Region: South Moravian
- District: Vyškov
- First mentioned: 1342

Area
  - Total: 6.36 km^{2} (2.46 sq mi)
- Elevation: 569 m (1,867 ft)

Population (2026-01-01)
  - Total: 521
  - Density: 81.9/km^{2} (212/sq mi)
- Time zone: UTC+1 (CET)
  - Summer (DST): UTC+2 (CEST)
- Postal code: 683 08
- Website: www.obec-studnice.cz

Studnice is a municipality and village in Vyškov District in the South Moravian Region of the Czech Republic. It has about 500 inhabitants.

Studnice lies approximately 15 kilometres (9 mi) north-west of Vyškov, 28 km (17 mi) north-east of Brno, and 194 km (121 mi) south-east of Prague.

== Administrative division ==
Studnice consists of two municipal parts (in brackets population according to the 2021 census):

- Studnice (400)
- Odrůvky (61)

== Demographics ==
Historical population
Year	Pop.	±%
1869	991	—
1880	1,050	+6.0%
1890	1,097	+4.5%
1900	1,102	+0.5%
1910	1,175	+6.6%
1921	1,195	+1.7%
1930	1,009	−15.6%
1950	716	−29.0%
1961	837	+16.9%
1970	805	−3.8%
1980	668	−17.0%
1991	572	−14.4%
2001	508	−11.2%
2011	466	−8.3%
2021	461	−1.1%
Source: Censuses
