= Podbřežice =

- Municipality
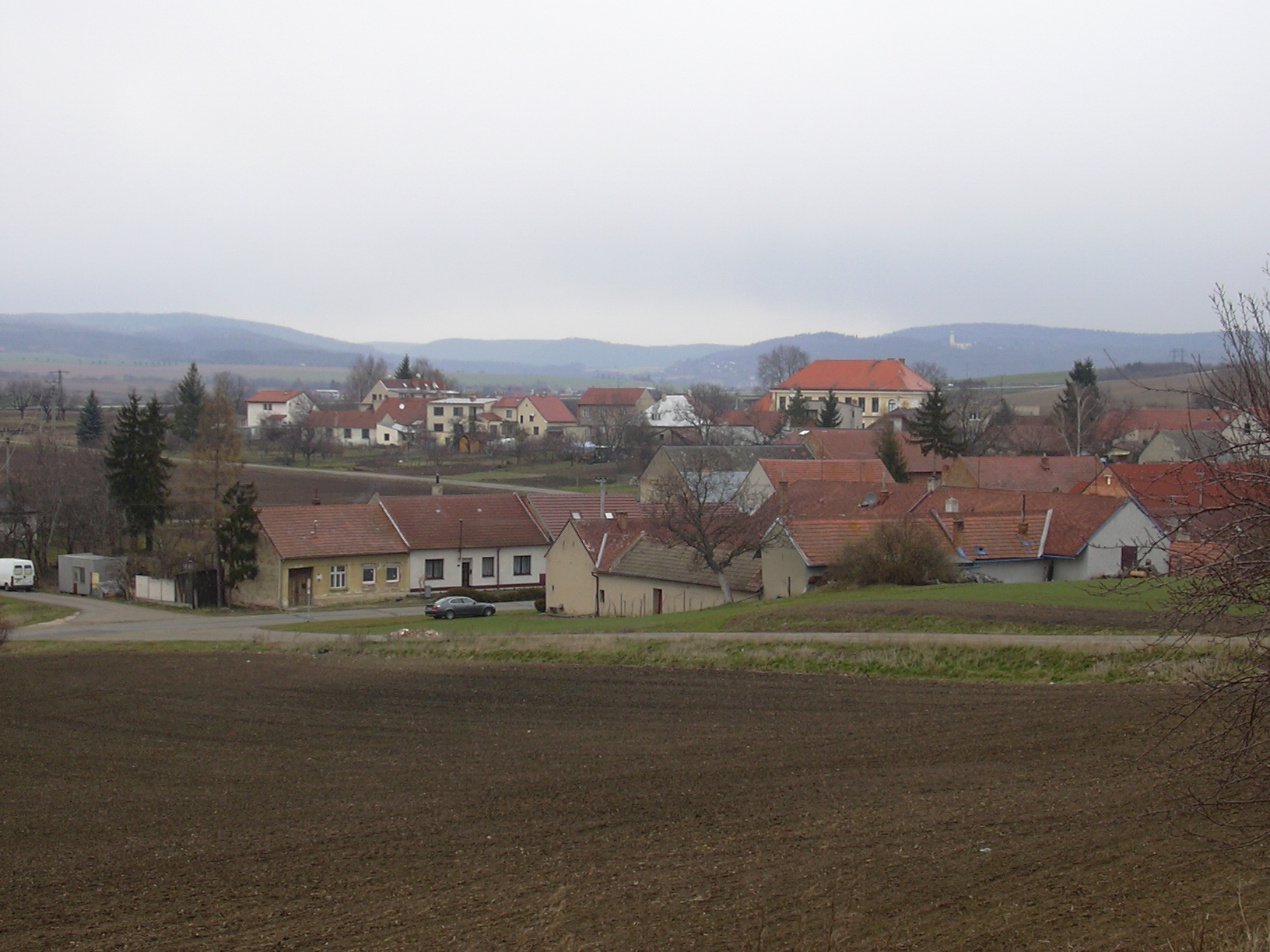
- General view

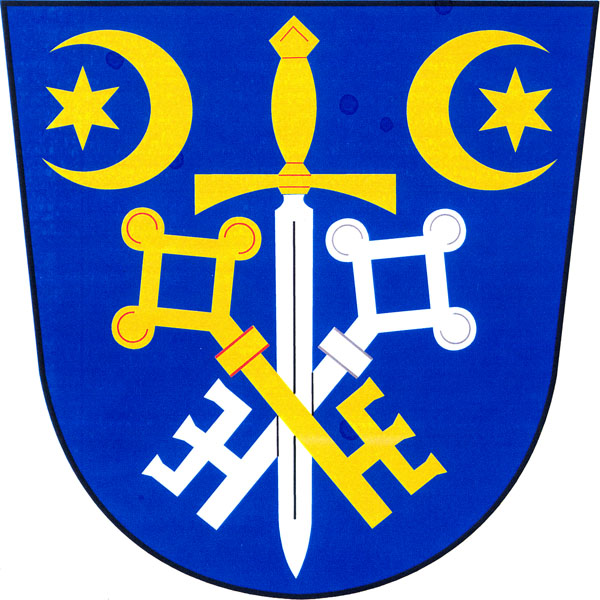
- Flag Coat of arms

- Location in the Czech Republic
- Coordinates: 49°12′45″N 16°55′41″E
- Country: Czech Republic
- Region: South Moravian
- District: Vyškov
- First mentioned: 1348

Area
  - Total: 3.54 km^{2} (1.37 sq mi)
- Elevation: 244 m (801 ft)

Population (2026-01-01)
  - Total: 314
  - Density: 88.7/km^{2} (230/sq mi)
- Time zone: UTC+1 (CET)
  - Summer (DST): UTC+2 (CEST)
- Postal code: 683 01
- Website: www.podbrezice.cz

Podbřežice is a municipality and village in Vyškov District in the South Moravian Region of the Czech Republic. It has about 300 inhabitants.

Podbřežice lies approximately 8 kilometres (5 mi) south-west of Vyškov, 24 km (15 mi) east of Brno, and 206 km (128 mi) south-east of Prague.

== Demographics ==
Historical population
Year	Pop.	±%
1869	281	—
1880	309	+10.0%
1890	318	+2.9%
1900	326	+2.5%
1910	398	+22.1%
1921	378	−5.0%
1930	394	+4.2%
1950	322	−18.3%
1961	304	−5.6%
1970	288	−5.3%
1980	263	−8.7%
1991	217	−17.5%
2001	231	+6.5%
2011	235	+1.7%
2021	239	+1.7%
Source: Censuses
