= Vyškov District =

Vyškov District Okres Vyškov
- District
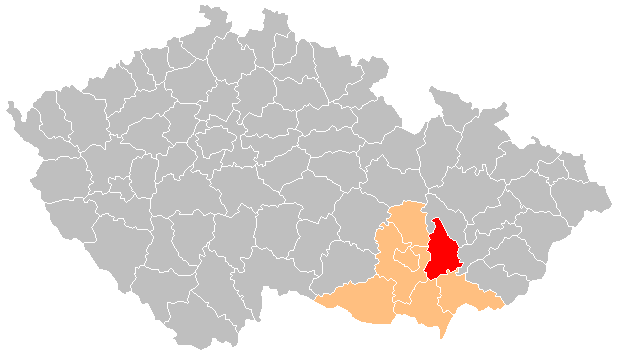
- Location in the South Moravian Region within the Czech Republic
- Coordinates: 49°16′N 16°59′E
- Country: Czech Republic
- Region: South Moravian
- Capital: Vyškov

Area
  - Total: 868.74 km^{2} (335.42 sq mi)

Population (2026)
  - Total: 95,991
  - Density: 110.49/km^{2} (286.18/sq mi)
- Time zone: UTC+1 (CET)
  - Summer (DST): UTC+2 (CEST)
- Municipalities: 79
- * Towns: 5
- * Market towns: 3

Vyškov District (Czech: okres Vyškov) is a district in the South Moravian Region of the Czech Republic. Its capital is the town of Vyškov.

== Administrative division ==
Vyškov District is divided into three administrative districts of municipalities with extended competence: Vyškov, Bučovice and Slavkov u Brna.

=== List of municipalities ===
Towns are marked in bold and market towns in italics:

Bohaté Málkovice - Bohdalice-Pavlovice - Bošovice - Brankovice - Bučovice - Chvalkovice - Dětkovice - Dobročkovice - Dražovice - Drnovice - Drysice - Habrovany - Heršpice - Hlubočany - Hodějice - Holubice - Hostěrádky-Rešov - Hoštice-Heroltice - Hrušky - Hvězdlice - Ivanovice na Hané - Ježkovice - Kobeřice u Brna - Kojátky - Komořany - Kozlany - Kožušice - Krásensko - Křenovice - Křižanovice - Křižanovice u Vyškova - Kučerov - Letonice - Lovčičky - Luleč - Lysovice - Malínky - Medlovice - Milešovice - Milonice - Moravské Málkovice - Mouřínov - Němčany - Nemochovice - Nemojany - Nemotice - Nesovice - Nevojice - Nížkovice - Nové Sady - Olšany - Orlovice - Otnice - Podbřežice - Podivice - Podomí - Prusy-Boškůvky - Pustiměř - Račice-Pístovice - Radslavice - Rašovice - Rostěnice-Zvonovice - Rousínov - Ruprechtov - Rybníček - Šaratice - Slavkov u Brna - Snovídky - Studnice - Švábenice - Topolany - Tučapy - Uhřice - Vážany nad Litavou - Vážany - Velešovice - Vyškov - Zbýšov - Zelená Hora

Part of the district area belongs to Military Training Area Březina.

== Geography ==
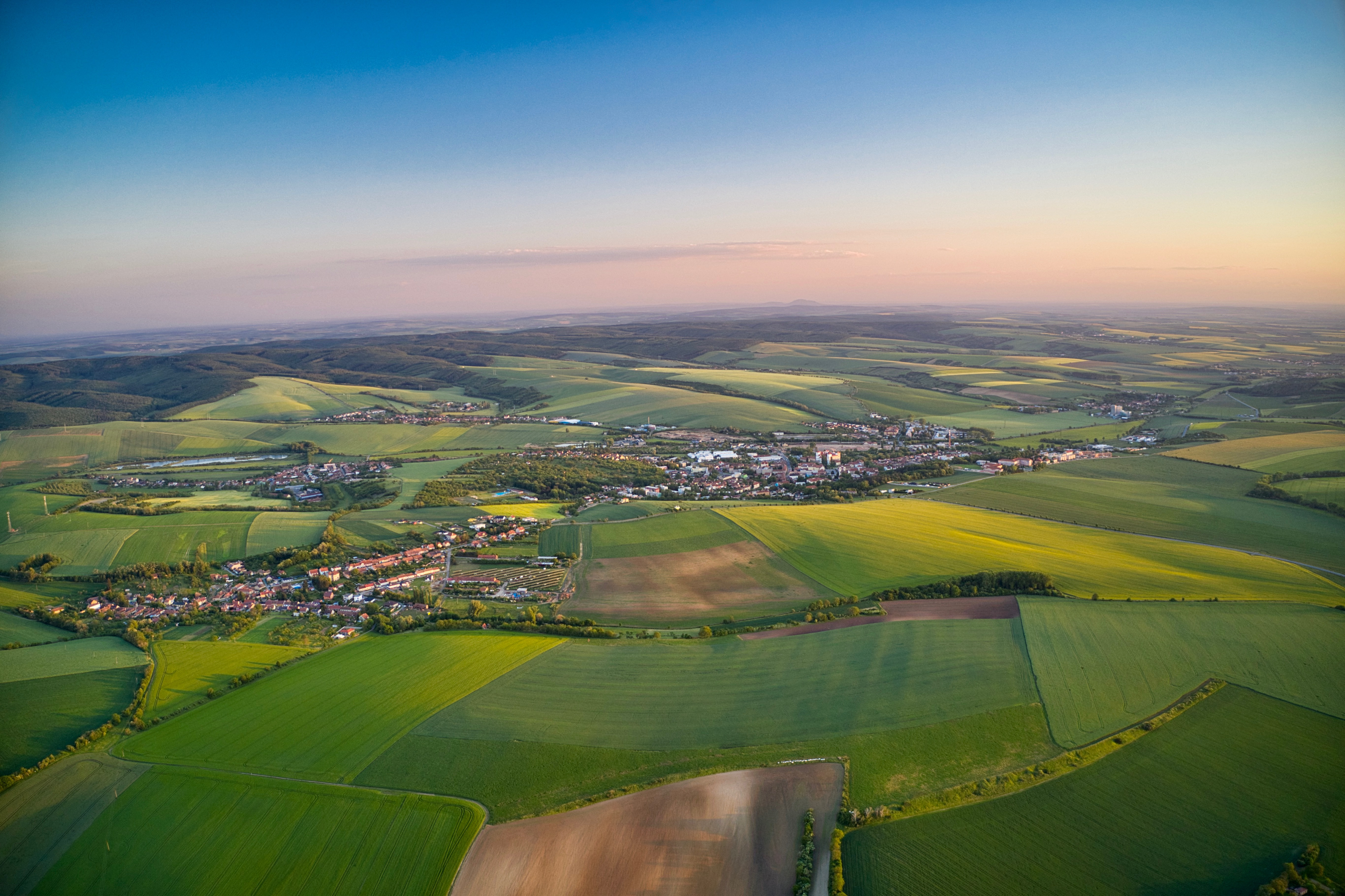
Bučovice and surrounding landscape

The district is characterised by a hilly landscape complemented by many valleys. The territory extends into five geomorphological mesoregions: Drahany Highlands (north), Litenčice Hills (west and east), Vyškov Gate (a strip between Drahany Highlands and Litenčice Hills), Ždánice Forest (south) and Dyje–Svratka Valley (small part in the west). The highest point of the district is the hill Horka in Military Training Area Březina with an elevation of 650 m (2,133 ft) and the lowest point is the river bed of the Litava in Hostěrádky-Rešov at 192 m (630 ft).

From the total district area of 868.7 km^{2} (335.4 sq mi), agricultural land occupies 467.4 km^{2} (180.5 sq mi), forests occupy 293.7 km^{2} (113.4 sq mi), and water area occupies 8.0 km^{2} (3.1 sq mi). Forests cover 33.8% of the district's area.

There are many watercourses in the territory, but none significant. The most important rivers are the Litava (a tributary of the Svratka), which flows across the district from east to west, and Haná, which flows to the east into the Morava. The territory is poor in bodies of water. The only notable body of water is Opatovice Reservoir with an area of 70.5 ha (174 acres).

There are no large-scale protected areas.

== Demographics ==
Historical population

Year	Pop.	±%
1869	70,537	—
1880	75,764	+7.4%
1890	79,382	+4.8%
1900	82,831	+4.3%
1910	89,496	+8.0%

Year	Pop.	±%
1921	90,172	+0.8%
1930	92,636	+2.7%
1950	85,249	−8.0%
1961	88,577	+3.9%
1970	85,554	−3.4%

Year	Pop.	±%
1980	87,248	+2.0%
1991	86,219	−1.2%
2001	86,110	−0.1%
2011	88,151	+2.4%
2021	91,578	+3.9%

Source: Censuses

=== Most populous municipalities ===
Name	Population	Area (km^{2})
Vyškov	20,664	50
Slavkov u Brna	7,294	15
Bučovice	6,859	31
Rousínov	5,948	23
Ivanovice na Hané	2,996	21
Drnovice	2,403	12
Křenovice	2,083	9
Holubice	1,929	7
Pustiměř	1,929	13
Otnice	1,571	9

== Economy ==
The largest employers with headquarters in Vyškov District and at least 500 employees are:

Economic entity	Location	Number of employees	Main activity
Lear Corporation Czech Republic	Vyškov	1,500–1,999	Manufacture of electronics for motor vehicles
Paradise Casino Admiral	Komořany	1,500–1,999	Gambling and betting activities
Lohmann & Rauscher	Slavkov u Brna	1,000–1,499	Manufacture of pharmaceutical products
Vyškov Hospital	Vyškov	1,000–1,499	Health care
Bioveta	Ivanovice na Hané	500–999	Manufacture of pharmaceutical products
European Data Project	Komořany	500–999	Manufacture of electrical devices for the gambling industry

== Transport ==
The D1 motorway from Brno to Ostrava leads across the district. The D46 motorway separates from it and leads from Vyškov to Olomouc.

== Sights ==
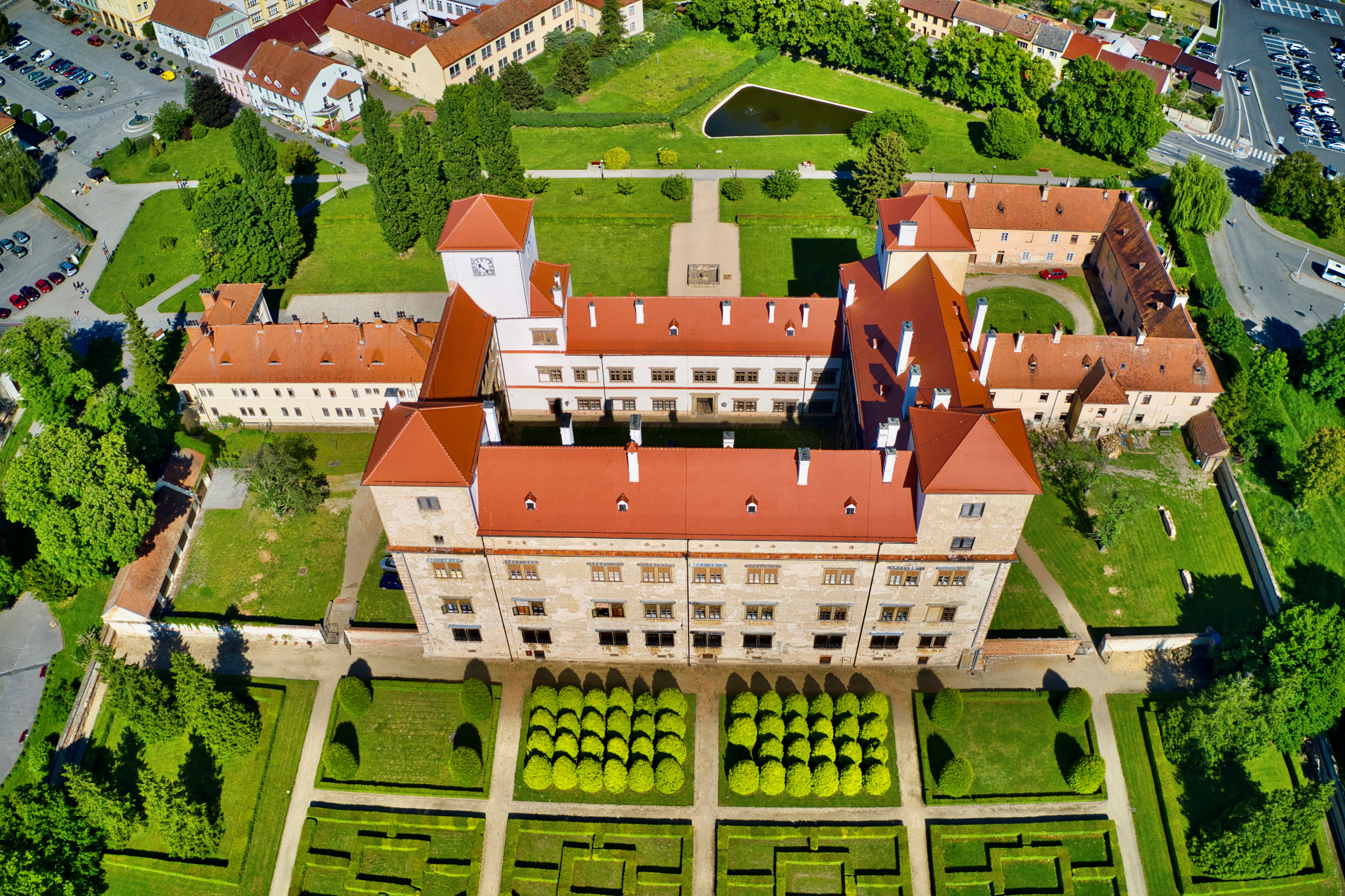
Bučovice Castle

The most important monuments in the district, protected as national cultural monuments, are:

- Bučovice Castle
- Slavkov Castle
- Homestead No. 12 in Kučerov

The best-preserved settlements and landscapes, protected as monument zones, are:

- Slavkov u Brna
- Vyškov
- Lysovice
- Rostěnice
- Zvonovice
- Battlefield of the Battle of Austerlitz (partly)

The most visited tourist destinations are Dinopark Vyškov and Vyškov Zoo.
