= Heršpice =

- Municipality
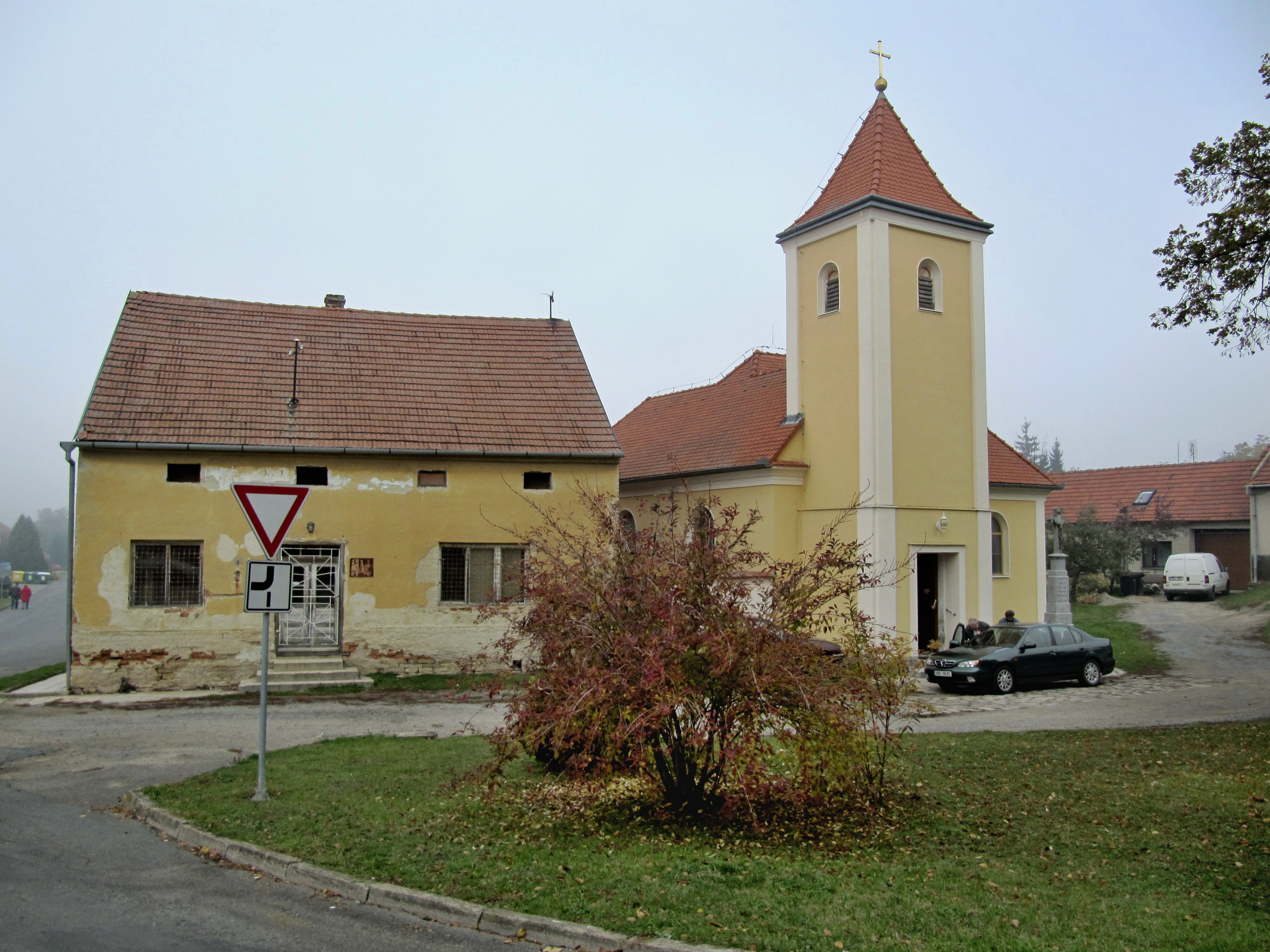
- Chapel of Saint Matthias

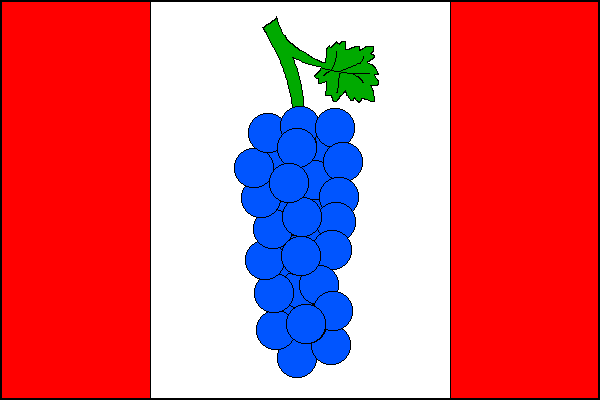
- Flag Coat of arms

- Location in the Czech Republic
- Coordinates: 49°7′11″N 16°54′49″E
- Country: Czech Republic
- Region: South Moravian
- District: Vyškov
- First mentioned: 1237

Area
  - Total: 18.05 km^{2} (6.97 sq mi)
- Elevation: 260 m (850 ft)

Population (2026-01-01)
  - Total: 953
  - Density: 52.8/km^{2} (137/sq mi)
- Time zone: UTC+1 (CET)
  - Summer (DST): UTC+2 (CEST)
- Postal code: 684 01
- Website: www.herspice.cz

Heršpice is a municipality and village in Vyškov District in the South Moravian Region of the Czech Republic. It has about 1,000 inhabitants.

Heršpice lies approximately 19 kilometres (12 mi) south of Vyškov, 25 km (16 mi) south-east of Brno, and 211 km (131 mi) south-east of Prague.

== Demographics ==
Historical population
Year	Pop.	±%
1869	600	—
1880	671	+11.8%
1890	722	+7.6%
1900	811	+12.3%
1910	920	+13.4%
1921	942	+2.4%
1930	947	+0.5%
1950	796	−15.9%
1961	867	+8.9%
1970	771	−11.1%
1980	697	−9.6%
1991	667	−4.3%
2001	643	−3.6%
2011	743	+15.6%
2021	850	+14.4%
Source: Censuses
