= Ježkovice =

- Municipality
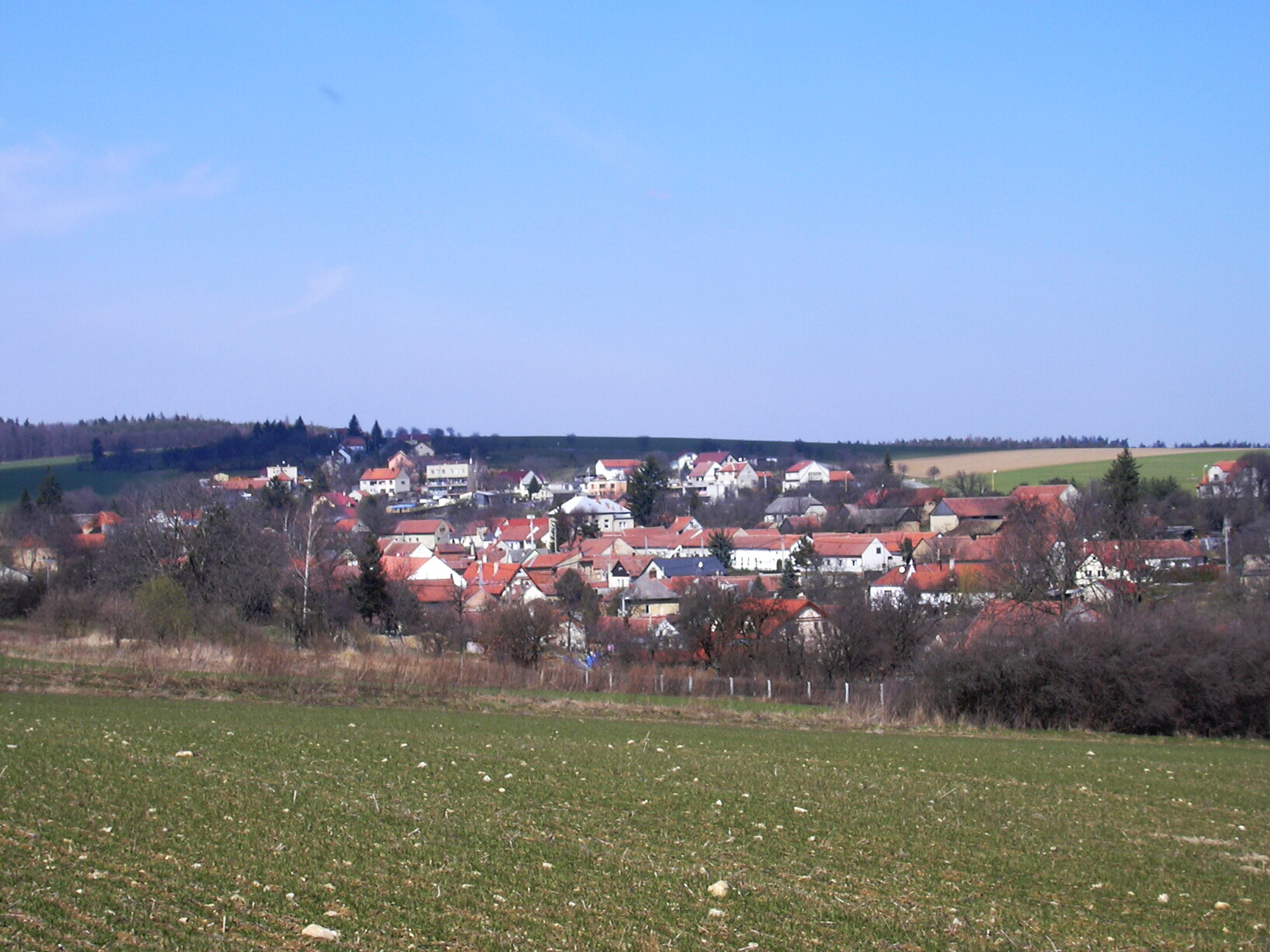
- General view

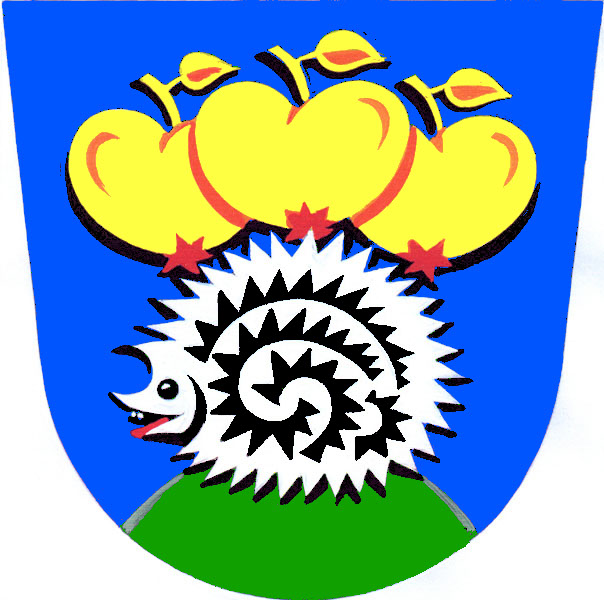
- Flag Coat of arms

- Location in the Czech Republic
- Coordinates: 49°17′53″N 16°53′33″E
- Country: Czech Republic
- Region: South Moravian
- District: Vyškov
- First mentioned: 1375

Area
  - Total: 11.68 km^{2} (4.51 sq mi)
- Elevation: 412 m (1,352 ft)

Population (2026-01-01)
  - Total: 393
  - Density: 33.6/km^{2} (87.1/sq mi)
- Time zone: UTC+1 (CET)
  - Summer (DST): UTC+2 (CEST)
- Postal code: 683 04
- Website: www.obecjezkovice.cz

Ježkovice is a municipality and village in Vyškov District in the South Moravian Region of the Czech Republic. It has about 400 inhabitants.

Ježkovice lies approximately 10 kilometres (6 mi) north-west of Vyškov, 23 km (14 mi) north-east of Brno, and 198 km (123 mi) south-east of Prague.

== Demographics ==
As of 2026, the population is 393, of which 47.8% are male, and 52.2% are female. People under 15 years old make up 14.2% of the population, and people over 65 years old make up 25.2%.

Historical population
Year	Pop.	±%
1869	638	—
1880	696	+9.1%
1890	725	+4.2%
1900	739	+1.9%
1910	716	−3.1%
1921	685	−4.3%
1930	623	−9.1%
1950	550	−11.7%
1961	591	+7.5%
1970	503	−14.9%
1980	484	−3.8%
1991	394	−18.6%
2001	382	−3.0%
2011	368	−3.7%
2021	376	+2.2%
Source: Censuses
