= Moravské Málkovice =

- Municipality
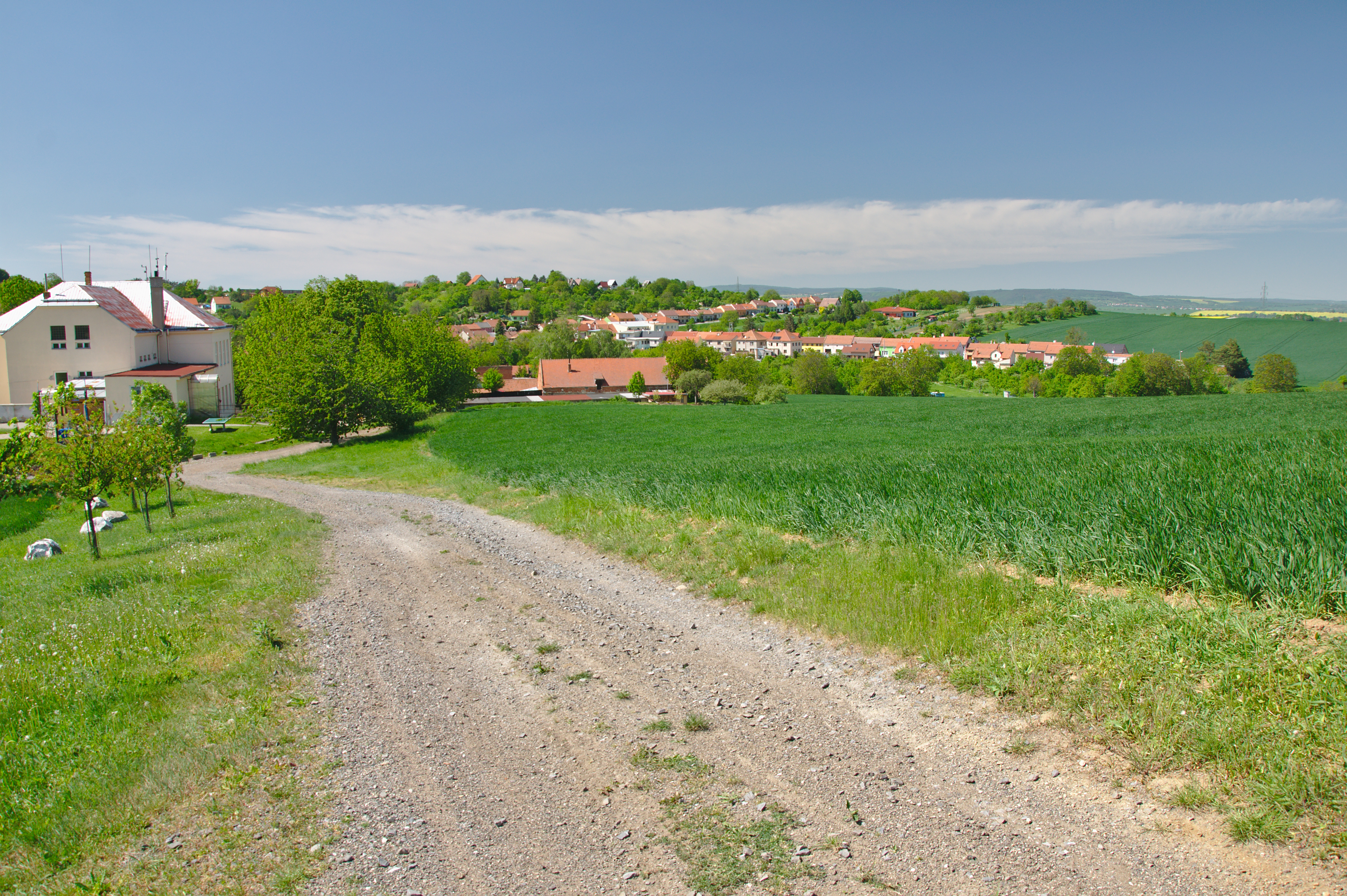
- General view

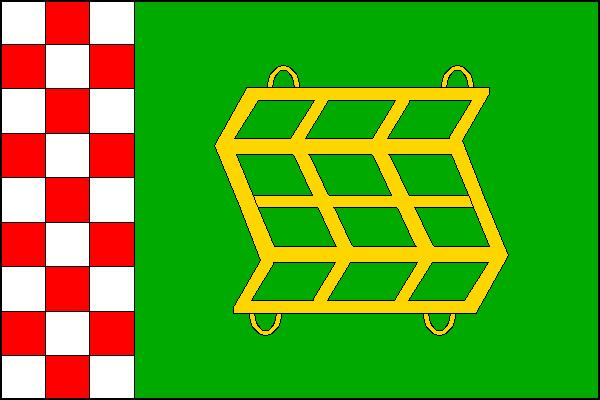
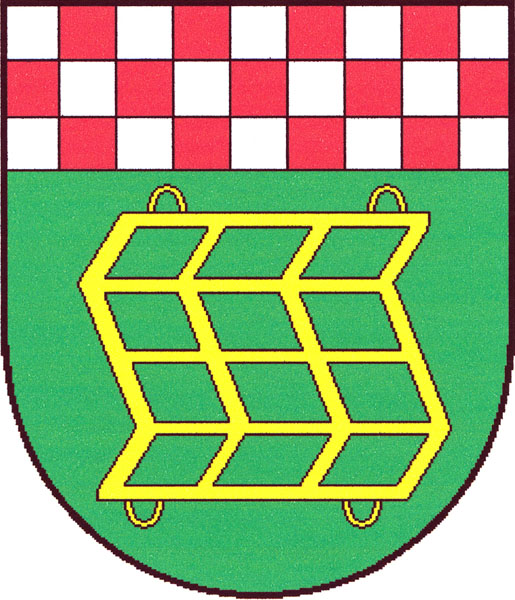
- Flag Coat of arms

- Location in the Czech Republic
- Coordinates: 49°15′25″N 17°5′26″E
- Country: Czech Republic
- Region: South Moravian
- District: Vyškov
- First mentioned: 1307

Area
  - Total: 3.65 km^{2} (1.41 sq mi)
- Elevation: 270 m (890 ft)

Population (2026-01-01)
  - Total: 594
  - Density: 163/km^{2} (421/sq mi)
- Time zone: UTC+1 (CET)
  - Summer (DST): UTC+2 (CEST)
- Postal code: 682 01
- Website: www.moravskemalkovice.cz

Moravské Málkovice is a municipality and village in Vyškov District in the South Moravian Region of the Czech Republic. It has about 600 inhabitants.

Moravské Málkovice lies approximately 8 kilometres (5 mi) east of Vyškov, 36 km (22 mi) east of Brno, and 214 km (133 mi) south-east of Prague.

== Demographics ==
Historical population
Year	Pop.	±%
1869	342	—
1880	419	+22.5%
1890	497	+18.6%
1900	546	+9.9%
1910	642	+17.6%
1921	629	−2.0%
1930	667	+6.0%
1950	675	+1.2%
1961	727	+7.7%
1970	653	−10.2%
1980	581	−11.0%
1991	497	−14.5%
2001	539	+8.5%
2011	544	+0.9%
2021	552	+1.5%
Source: Censuses
