= Milešovice =

- Municipality
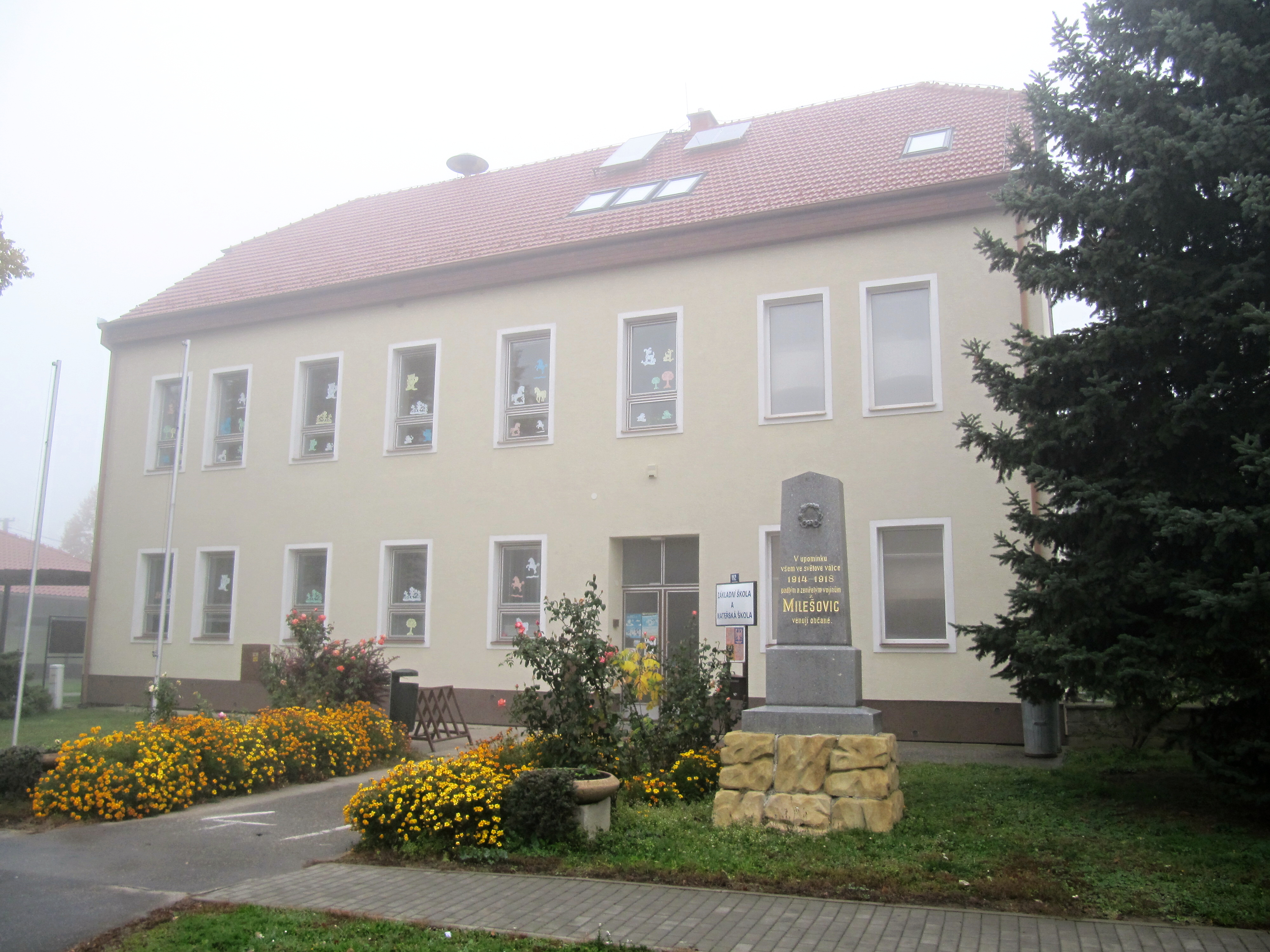
- Primary school

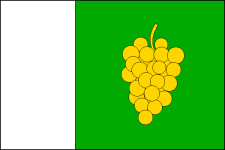
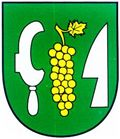
- Flag Coat of arms

- Location in the Czech Republic
- Coordinates: 49°4′58″N 16°51′15″E
- Country: Czech Republic
- Region: South Moravian
- District: Vyškov
- First mentioned: 1366

Area
  - Total: 6.71 km^{2} (2.59 sq mi)
- Elevation: 245 m (804 ft)

Population (2026-01-01)
  - Total: 718
  - Density: 107/km^{2} (277/sq mi)
- Time zone: UTC+1 (CET)
  - Summer (DST): UTC+2 (CEST)
- Postal code: 683 54
- Website: www.milesovice.cz

Milešovice is a municipality and village in Vyškov District in the South Moravian Region of the Czech Republic. It has about 700 inhabitants.

Milešovice lies approximately 23 kilometres (14 mi) south-west of Vyškov, 22 km (14 mi) south-east of Brno, and 208 km (129 mi) south-east of Prague.

== Demographics ==
Historical population
Year	Pop.	±%
1869	537	—
1880	597	+11.2%
1890	651	+9.0%
1900	723	+11.1%
1910	801	+10.8%
1921	819	+2.2%
1930	855	+4.4%
1950	732	−14.4%
1961	738	+0.8%
1970	664	−10.0%
1980	642	−3.3%
1991	622	−3.1%
2001	614	−1.3%
2011	663	+8.0%
2021	684	+3.2%
Source: Censuses
