= List of administrative districts of municipalities with extended powers in the Czech Republic =

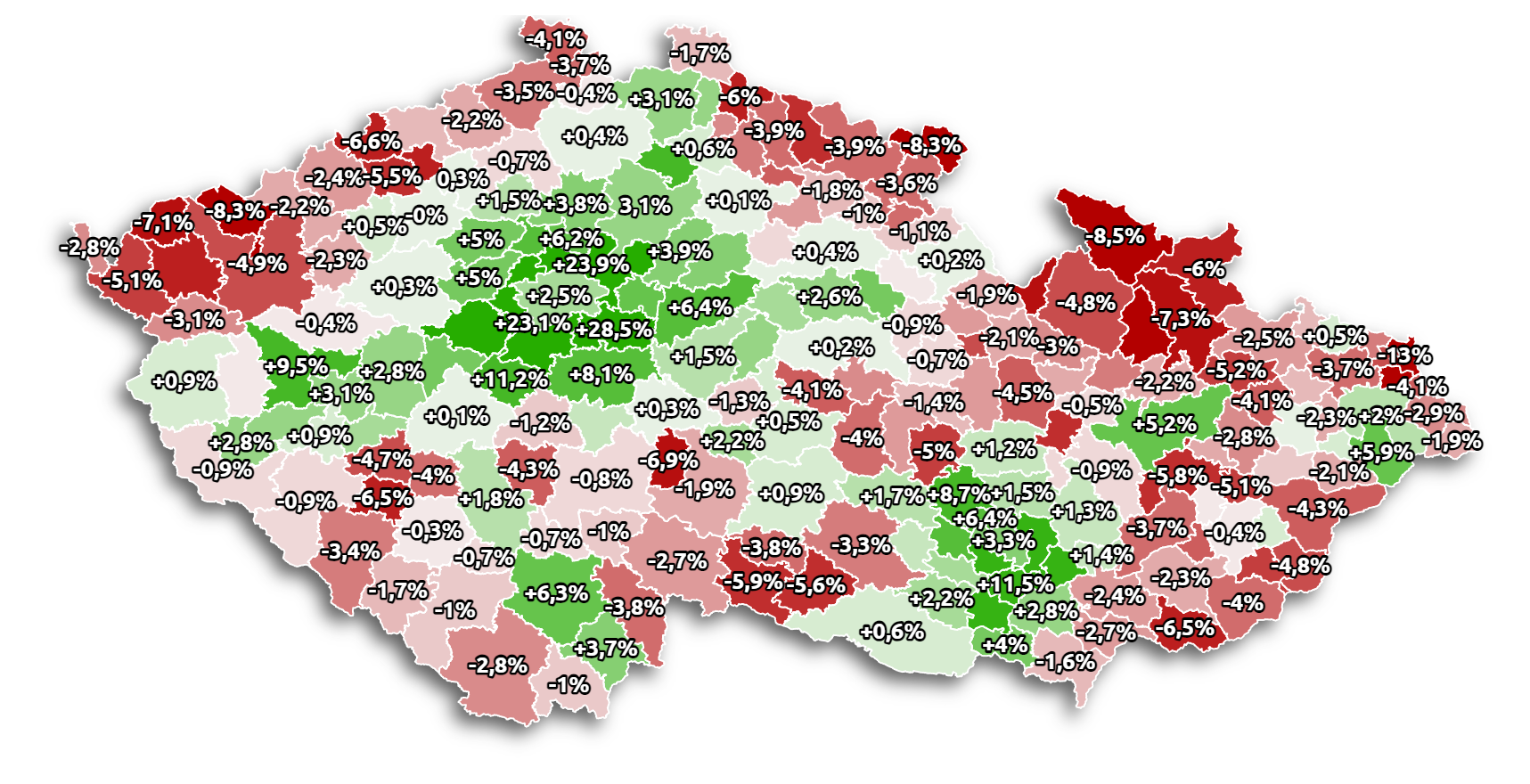
Change in population between 2011-2021

This is a list of administrative districts of municipalities with extended powers (AD MEP) in the Czech Republic. There are a total of 205 municipalities with extended powers in the Czech Republic, with the Central Bohemian and Moravian-Silesian regions having the most at 26 and 22 respectively. On the contrary, the Karlovy Vary and Liberec regions have the least at 7 and 10 respectively. Prague is also sometimes listed among the municipalities with extended powers.

AD MEP	Region	Population (2024)	Area (km^{2})	Density (inhab./km^{2})	Municipalities
Brno	South Moravian	400,566	230.18	1,740.2	1
Ostrava	Moravian-Silesian	317,586	331.53	957.9	13
Plzeň	Plzeň	206,013	261.46	787.9	15
Olomouc	Olomouc	168,674	816.97	206.5	45
České Budějovice	South Bohemian	168,176	923.76	182.1	79
Černošice	Central Bohemian	160,626	580.63	276.6	79
Liberec	Liberec	150,432	578.39	260.1	28
Hradec Králové	Hradec Králové	149,817	677.43	221.2	81
Pardubice	Pardubice	135,309	409.3	330.6	56
Kladno	Central Bohemian	128,058	350.9	364.9	48
Brandýs nad Labem-Stará Boleslav	Central Bohemian	123,026	378.17	325.3	58
Ústí nad Labem	Ústí nad Labem	118,433	404.7	292.6	23
Mladá Boleslav	Central Bohemian	117,807	810.37	145.4	98
Frýdek-Místek	Moravian-Silesian	112,812	480.23	234.9	37
Teplice	Ústí nad Labem	108,317	345.34	313.7	26
Jihlava	Vysočina	104,689	916.89	114.2	78
Opava	Moravian-Silesian	100,595	567.01	177.4	41
Zlín	Zlín	99,544	350.39	284.1	30
Prostějov	Olomouc	97,109	598.95	162.1	75
Znojmo	South Moravian	93,336	1,242.54	75.1	111
Uherské Hradiště	Zlín	89,851	517.84	173.5	48
Karlovy Vary	Karlovy Vary	88,671	1,171.45	75.7	40
Kolín	Central Bohemian	86,723	584.23	148.4	69
Chrudim	Pardubice	85,508	746.14	114.6	86
Havířov	Moravian-Silesian	85,310	88.19	967.3	5
Tábor	South Bohemian	81,524	1,002.44	81.3	79
Chomutov	Ústí nad Labem	80,828	486.07	166.3	25
Říčany	Central Bohemian	79,041	377.27	209.5	52
Přerov	Olomouc	78,503	400.76	195.9	59
Česká Lípa	Liberec	77,233	871.97	88.6	41
Děčín	Ústí nad Labem	74,893	553.73	135.3	34
Třebíč	Vysočina	73,988	837.45	88.3	93
Šlapanice	South Moravian	73,138	343.12	213.2	40
Sokolov	Karlovy Vary	72,913	489.19	149	30
Most	Ústí nad Labem	72,218	231.12	312.5	15
Příbram	Central Bohemian	71,949	795.64	90.4	74
Beroun	Central Bohemian	69,888	415.65	168.1	48
Šumperk	Olomouc	67,861	857.46	79.1	36
Kroměříž	Zlín	67,542	499.02	135.3	46
Vsetín	Zlín	64,496	662.38	97.4	32
Benešov	Central Bohemian	64,052	690.03	92.8	51
Trutnov	Hradec Králové	62,618	595.42	105.2	31
Náchod	Hradec Králové	61,001	355.72	171.5	36
Karviná	Moravian-Silesian	60,862	105.62	576.2	4
Nýřany	Plzeň	60,419	627.5	96.3	54
Břeclav	South Moravian	59,918	438.86	136.5	18
Hodonín	South Moravian	59,615	286.04	208.4	18
Litoměřice	Ústí nad Labem	58,499	470.57	124.3	40
Jablonec nad Nisou	Liberec	58,012	156.8	370	12
Blansko	South Moravian	57,412	351.41	163.4	43
Rakovník	Central Bohemian	56,410	896.3	62.9	83
Kyjov	South Moravian	55,341	470.34	117.7	42
Písek	South Bohemian	54,647	741.83	73.7	49
Havlíčkův Brod	Vysočina	54,396	636.83	85.4	57
Třinec	Moravian-Silesian	53,975	234.67	230	12
Boskovice	South Moravian	53,613	511.03	104.9	73
Vyškov	South Moravian	53,179	540.07	98.5	41
Klatovy	Plzeň	51,970	906.14	57.4	44
Uherský Brod	Zlín	51,885	473.29	109.6	30
Kutná Hora	Central Bohemian	51,879	642.98	80.7	51
Cheb	Karlovy Vary	51,232	496.81	103.1	21
Rokycany	Plzeň	50,804	657	77.3	68
Nový Jičín	Moravian-Silesian	48,831	275.36	177.3	16
Jičín	Hradec Králové	48,814	596.76	81.8	77
Jindřichův Hradec	South Bohemian	46,718	933.7	50	58
Mělník	Central Bohemian	46,581	456.76	102	39
Pelhřimov	Vysočina	46,403	827.42	56.1	71
Strakonice	South Bohemian	45,330	574.13	79	69
Louny	Ústí nad Labem	43,520	472.67	92.1	41
Kadaň	Ústí nad Labem	43,119	449.62	95.9	19
Valašské Meziříčí	Zlín	42,757	229.66	186.2	18
Žďár nad Sázavou	Vysočina	42,750	464.45	92	48
Slaný	Central Bohemian	42,214	368.76	114.5	52
Český Krumlov	South Bohemian	41,875	1,129	37.1	31
Nymburk	Central Bohemian	41,770	355.54	117.5	39
Domažlice	Plzeň	40,840	763.16	53.5	58
Kopřivnice	Moravian-Silesian	40,689	121.31	335.4	10
Hlučín	Moravian-Silesian	40,329	165.32	243.9	15
Tachov	Plzeň	40,265	947.77	42.5	27
Krnov	Moravian-Silesian	39,234	574.45	68.3	25
Hustopeče	South Moravian	37,899	355.11	106.7	28
Velké Meziříčí	Vysočina	37,531	473.43	79.3	57
Jeseník	Olomouc	36,949	718.96	51.4	24
Veselí nad Moravou	South Moravian	36,658	342.78	106.9	22
Orlová	Moravian-Silesian	36,365	45.08	806.7	3
Litvínov	Ústí nad Labem	35,734	235.97	151.4	11
Rychnov nad Kněžnou	Hradec Králové	35,313	479.43	73.7	32
Bruntál	Moravian-Silesian	35,245	629.85	56	31
Rožnov pod Radhoštěm	Zlín	35,048	239.05	146.6	9
Židlochovice	South Moravian	34,552	194.26	177.9	24
Hranice	Olomouc	34,517	334.92	103.1	32
Kralupy nad Vltavou	Central Bohemian	34,369	131.2	262	18
Prachatice	South Bohemian	34,033	841.34	40.5	44
Otrokovice	Zlín	34,001	111.09	306.1	10
Turnov	Liberec	33,786	232.64	145.2	36
Bohumín	Moravian-Silesian	33,617	72.93	460.9	3
Roudnice nad Labem	Ústí nad Labem	33,365	300.23	111.1	33
Neratovice	Central Bohemian	33,165	113.1	293.2	12
Zábřeh	Olomouc	33,103	267.24	123.9	28
Vysoké Mýto	Pardubice	32,915	281.89	116.8	40
Tišnov	South Moravian	32,832	342.36	95.9	59
Poděbrady	Central Bohemian	32,738	348.67	93.9	35
Rumburk	Ústí nad Labem	32,222	266.19	121	12
Lysá nad Labem	Central Bohemian	32,043	142.17	225.4	12
Hořovice	Central Bohemian	31,860	287.97	110.6	37
Svitavy	Pardubice	30,884	351.6	87.8	28
Žamberk	Pardubice	29,511	281.5	104.8	27
Litomyšl	Pardubice	27,804	337.1	82.5	35
Žatec	Ústí nad Labem	27,757	307.36	90.3	18
Lovosice	Ústí nad Labem	27,622	261.61	105.6	32
Vrchlabí	Hradec Králové	27,236	293.46	92.8	16
Dvůr Králové nad Labem	Hradec Králové	27,111	257.84	105.1	28
Rosice	South Moravian	27,089	174.45	155.3	24
Přelouč	Pardubice	26,860	257.26	104.4	42
Čáslav	Central Bohemian	26,552	274.41	96.8	37
Ostrov	Karlovy Vary	26,512	339.29	78.1	15
Vlašim	Central Bohemian	26,443	495.97	53.3	48
Ústí nad Orlicí	Pardubice	26,419	190.51	138.7	16
Nový Bor	Liberec	26,277	200.88	130.8	16
Moravská Třebová	Pardubice	25,976	417.27	62.3	33
Mariánské Lázně	Karlovy Vary	25,737	405.32	63.5	14
Bílovec	Moravian-Silesian	25,702	162.45	158.2	12
Semily	Liberec	25,574	230.07	111.2	22
Ivančice	South Moravian	25,460	172.53	147.6	17
Frýdlant nad Ostravicí	Moravian-Silesian	25,418	317.43	80.1	11
Kostelec nad Orlicí	Hradec Králové	25,337	223.52	113.4	22
Slavkov u Brna	South Moravian	25,060	157.7	158.9	18
Třeboň	South Bohemian	24,987	538.32	46.4	25
Český Těšín	Moravian-Silesian	24,677	44.42	555.5	2
Frýdlant	Liberec	24,641	349.36	70.5	18
Stod	Plzeň	24,613	259.2	95	24
Kuřim	South Moravian	24,319	77.05	315.6	10
Dobříš	Central Bohemian	24,095	318.53	75.6	24
Šternberk	Olomouc	24,034	336.13	71.5	22
Litovel	Olomouc	23,814	247.48	96.2	20
Sušice	Plzeň	23,787	780.67	30.5	30
Lanškroun	Pardubice	23,188	275.21	84.3	22
Přeštice	Plzeň	23,121	271.24	85.2	30
Kralovice	Plzeň	23,002	659.25	34.9	44
Moravské Budějovice	Vysočina	22,916	414.02	55.3	47
Valašské Klobouky	Zlín	22,855	258.75	88.3	20
Moravský Krumlov	South Moravian	22,774	347.84	65.5	33
Soběslav	South Bohemian	22,648	323.94	69.9	31
Jablunkov	Moravian-Silesian	22,394	176.1	127.2	12
Uničov	Olomouc	22,321	207.48	107.6	10
Sedlčany	Central Bohemian	22,106	448.72	49.3	22
Jilemnice	Liberec	22,002	278.6	79	21
Chotěboř	Vysočina	21,806	329.05	66.3	31
Holešov	Zlín	21,709	132.61	163.7	19
Hlinsko	Pardubice	21,108	246.69	85.6	22
Kravaře	Moravian-Silesian	21,104	100.61	209.8	9
Mikulov	South Moravian	21,011	244.12	86.1	17
Český Brod	Central Bohemian	21,008	163.32	128.6	21
Tanvald	Liberec	20,464	190.6	107.4	10
Dobruška	Hradec Králové	20,234	279.12	72.5	26
Kaplice	South Bohemian	20,197	484.66	41.7	15
Polička	Pardubice	20,005	272.66	73.4	20
Světlá nad Sázavou	Vysočina	19,656	290.15	67.7	32
Jaroměř	Hradec Králové	19,655	138.59	141.8	15
Trhové Sviny	South Bohemian	19,627	452.35	43.4	16
Frenštát pod Radhoštěm	Moravian-Silesian	19,624	98.72	198.8	6
Bystřice nad Pernštejnem	Vysočina	19,603	347.94	56.3	39
Bílina	Ústí nad Labem	19,601	123.58	158.6	8
Varnsdorf	Ústí nad Labem	19,419	88.85	218.6	6
Nové Město na Moravě	Vysočina	19,412	292.85	66.3	30
Mohelnice	Olomouc	18,874	188.36	100.2	14
Holice	Pardubice	18,719	213.65	87.6	14
Mnichovo Hradiště	Central Bohemian	18,673	212.51	87.9	22
Humpolec	Vysočina	18,671	228.03	81.9	25
Luhačovice	Zlín	18,609	178.38	104.3	15
Hořice	Hradec Králové	18,566	192.88	96.3	29
Dačice	South Bohemian	18,541	471.85	39.3	23
Milevsko	South Bohemian	18,204	385.1	47.3	26
Nový Bydžov	Hradec Králové	18,084	214.23	84.4	23
Stříbro	Plzeň	17,920	430.68	41.6	24
Česká Třebová	Pardubice	17,763	79.7	222.9	5
Vimperk	South Bohemian	17,441	535.4	32.6	21
Vizovice	Zlín	17,288	146.08	118.3	16
Aš	Karlovy Vary	17,255	143.75	120	5
Odry	Moravian-Silesian	16,935	223.99	75.6	10
Bučovice	South Moravian	16,838	171	98.5	20
Pohořelice	South Moravian	16,139	195.21	82.7	13
Broumov	Hradec Králové	15,673	259.35	60.4	14
Podbořany	Ústí nad Labem	15,622	340.97	45.8	11
Lipník nad Bečvou	Olomouc	15,284	118.64	128.8	14
Horšovský Týn	Plzeň	15,280	288.72	52.9	18
Bystřice pod Hostýnem	Zlín	15,159	163.96	92.5	14
Rýmařov	Moravian-Silesian	14,689	332.34	44.2	11
Nové Město nad Metují	Hradec Králové	14,124	98.09	144	13
Týn nad Vltavou	South Bohemian	14,123	262.4	53.8	14
Blatná	South Bohemian	13,854	278.56	49.7	26
Náměšť nad Oslavou	Vysočina	13,599	211.28	64.4	27
Nová Paka	Hradec Králové	13,366	97.22	137.5	5
Vítkov	Moravian-Silesian	13,211	282.9	46.7	12
Telč	Vysočina	13,039	291.34	44.8	45
Votice	Central Bohemian	12,864	288.84	44.5	15
Kraslice	Karlovy Vary	12,757	264.54	48.2	8
Blovice	Plzeň	12,593	229.03	55	19
Vodňany	South Bohemian	12,580	179.23	70.2	17
Železný Brod	Liberec	12,307	74.05	166.2	11
Konice	Olomouc	11,821	178.13	66.4	22
Horažďovice	Plzeň	11,481	258.76	44.4	20
Nepomuk	Plzeň	11,266	308.77	36.5	26
Pacov	Vysočina	9,501	234.61	40.5	24
Králíky	Pardubice	8,591	158.6	54.2	5
