= Bučovice (administrative district) =

Administrative district in the South Moravian Region, Czech Republic

Administrative district of the municipality with extended powers of Bučovice Správní obvod obce s rozšířenou působností Bučovice
- Administrative district of municipality with extended powers
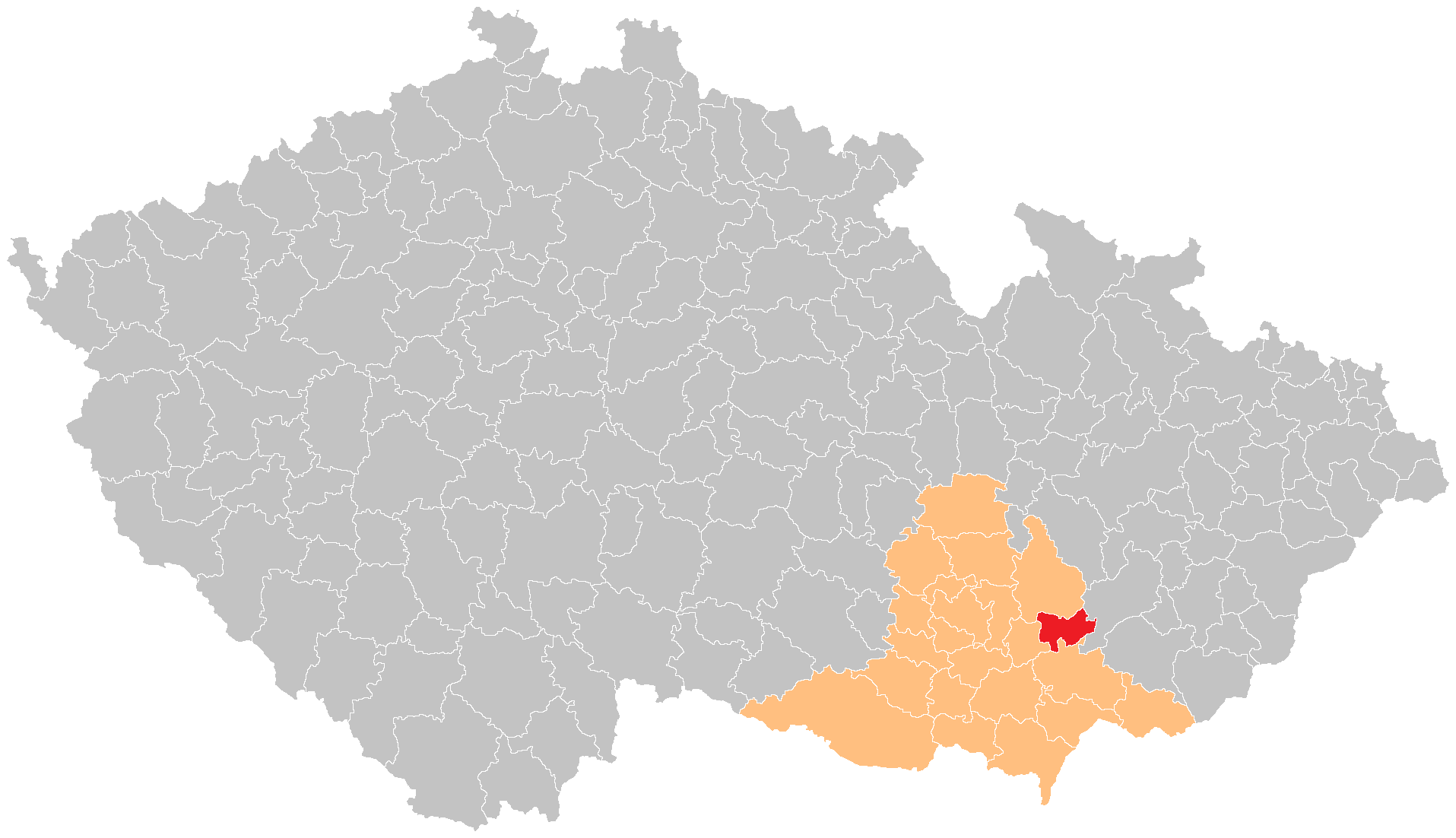
- Location in the South Moravian Region within the Czech Republic
- Coordinates: 49°9′N 17°3′E
- Country: Czech Republic
- Region: South Moravian
- District: Vyškov
- Municipality with extended powers: Bučovice

Area
  - Total: 171 km^{2} (66 sq mi)

Population (2024)
  - Total: 16,838
  - Density: 98.5/km^{2} (255/sq mi)
- Time zone: UTC+1 (CET)
  - Summer (DST): UTC+2 (CEST)
- Municipalities: 20
- * Cities and towns: 1
- * Market towns: 1

The administrative district of the municipality with extended powers of Bučovice (abbreviated AD MEP Bučovice; Czech: Správní obvod obce s rozšířenou působností Bučovice, SO ORP Bučovice) is an administrative district of municipality with extended powers in Vyškov District in the South Moravian Region of the Czech Republic. It has existed since 1 January 2003, when the districts were replaced administratively. It includes 20 municipalities which have a combined population of about 17,000.

== Municipalities ==
Cities and towns are in bold, and market towns are in italics.

Municipality	Population	Area (km^{2)}	Density
Bohaté Málkovice	246	4.81	51
Brankovice	889	12.15	73
**Bučovice**	6,891	31.18	221
Dobročkovice	237	5.03	47
Dražovice	951	6.40	148
Chvalkovice	294	6.94	42
Kojátky	372	5.82	64
Kožušice	109	7.18	15
Křižanovice	870	4.79	181
Letonice	1,382	11.01	125
Malínky	146	3.41	43
Milonice	356	4.98	71
Mouřínov	483	11.52	42
Nemochovice	351	10.59	33
Nemotice	438	3.68	119
Nesovice	1,114	10.27	108
Nevojice	426	10.61	40
Rašovice	704	5.66	124
Snovídky	333	10.57	32
Uhřice	246	4.39	56

== Demographics ==
Historical population

Year	Pop.	±%
1869	14,607	—
1880	15,702	+7.5%
1890	16,269	+3.6%
1900	16,924	+4.0%
1910	18,055	+6.7%

Year	Pop.	±%
1921	18,714	+3.6%
1930	19,178	+2.5%
1950	17,792	−7.2%
1961	18,352	+3.1%
1970	17,156	−6.5%

Year	Pop.	±%
1980	16,781	−2.2%
1991	15,641	−6.8%
2001	15,756	+0.7%
2011	15,672	−0.5%
2021	15,896	+1.4%

Source: Censuses
