= Lysá nad Labem (administrative district) =

Czech district in the Central Bohemian Region

Administrative district of the municipality with extended powers of Lysá nad Labem Správní obvod obce s rozšířenou působností Lysá nad Labem
- Administrative district of municipality with extended powers
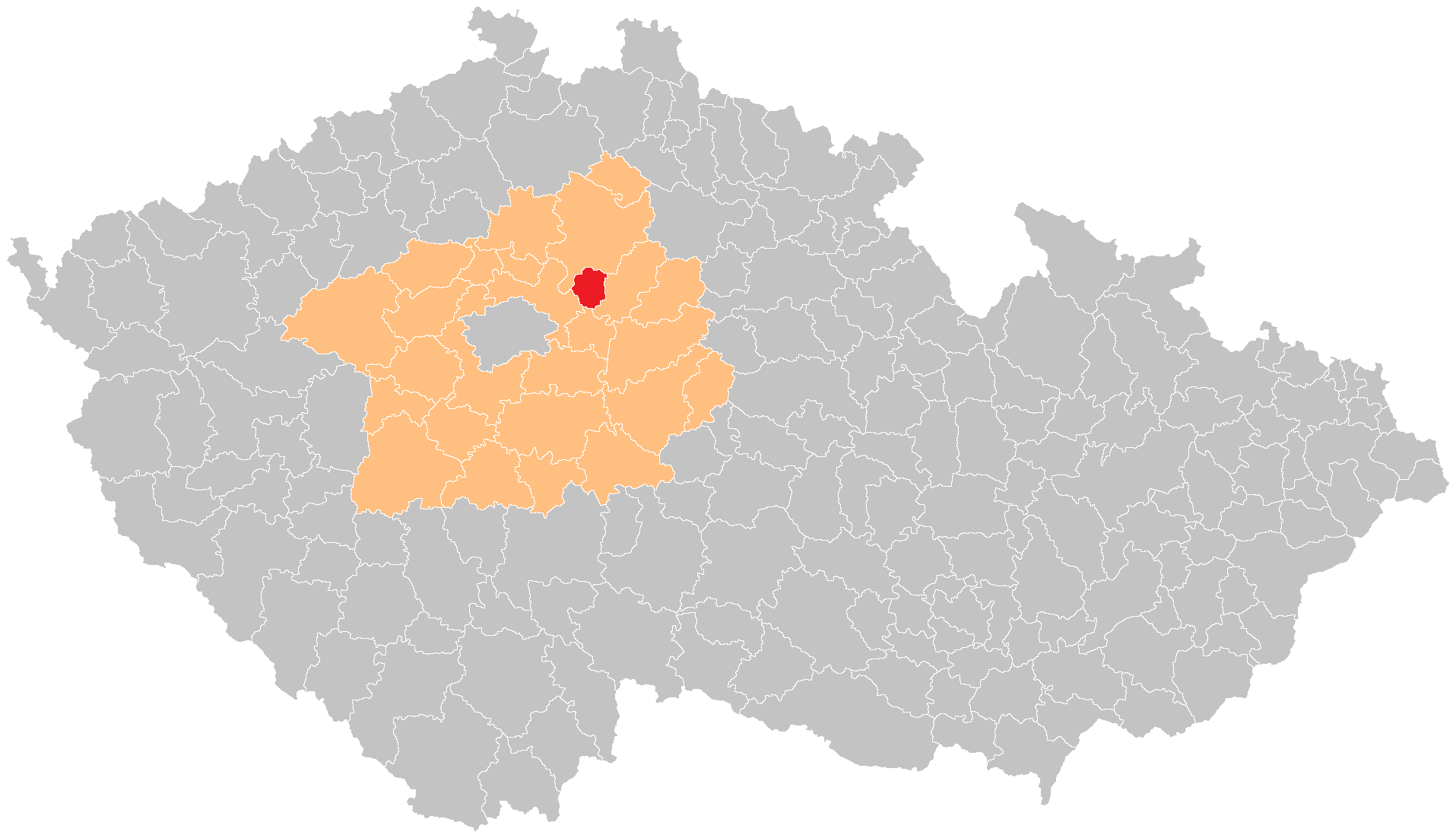
- Location in the Central Bohemian Region within the Czech Republic
- Coordinates: 49°11′N 14°50′E
- Country: Czech Republic
- Region: Central Bohemian
- District: Nymburk
- Municipality with extended powers: Lysá nad Labem

Area
  - Total: 142.17 km^{2} (54.89 sq mi)

Population (2024)
  - Total: 32,043
  - Density: 225.39/km^{2} (583.74/sq mi)
- Time zone: UTC+1 (CET)
  - Summer (DST): UTC+2 (CEST)
- Municipalities: 12
- * Cities and towns: 2
- * Market towns: 1

The administrative district of the municipality with extended powers of Lysá nad Labem (abbreviated AD MEP Lysá nad Labem; Czech: Správní obvod obce s rozšířenou působností Lysá nad Labem, SO ORP Lysá nad Labem) is an administrative district of municipality with extended powers in Nymburk District in the Central Bohemian Region of the Czech Republic. It has existed since 1 January 2003, when the districts were replaced administratively. It includes 12 municipalities which have a combined population of about 32,000.

== Municipalities ==
Cities and towns are in bold, and market towns are in italics.

On 1 January 2021, the municipalities of Bříství, Kounice and Vykáň were moved from the administrative district of Český Brod to Lysá nad Labem.

Municipality	Population	Area (km^{2)}	Density
Bříství	392	3.60	108
Jiřice	325	8.37	39
Kounice	1,703	11.29	150
**Lysá nad Labem**	10,062	33.67	298
**Milovice**	13,920	28.34	491
Ostrá	625	11.08	56
Přerov nad Labem	1,252	10.66	117
Semice	1,547	9.43	164
Stará Lysá	826	9.69	85
Starý Vestec	233	3.55	66
Stratov	730	6.30	115
Vykáň	428	6.17	69

== Demographics ==
Between 2011 and 2021, the Lysá nad Labem administrative district grew by 20.4%, making it one the fastest growing administrative districts in the country.

Historical population

Year	Pop.	±%
1869	11,708	—
1880	13,124	+12.1%
1890	13,493	+2.8%
1900	13,596	+0.8%
1910	14,338	+5.5%

Year	Pop.	±%
1921	16,120	+12.4%
1930	19,896	+23.4%
1950	19,737	−0.8%
1961	18,670	−5.4%
1970	18,047	−3.3%

Year	Pop.	±%
1980	15,802	−12.4%
1991	14,593	−7.7%
2001	17,445	+19.5%
2011	25,555	+46.5%
2021	30,768	+20.4%

Source: Censuses (Note: Including the municipalities of Bříství, Kounice and Vykáň, part of the administrative district since 2021.)
