= Antonín Pospíšil =

Czechoslovak politician (1903–1973)

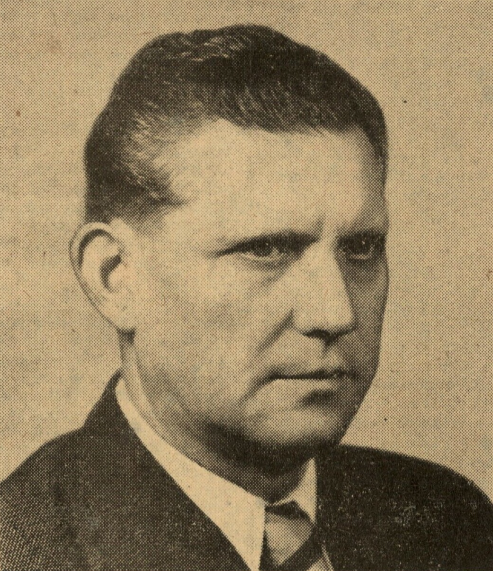
Antonín Pospíšil

Antonín Pospíšil (10 June 1903, Mouřínov – 15 June 1973, Prague) was a Czechoslovak politician of the Catholic Czechoslovak People's Party during the Communist Party's rule, when other legal parties had to play the role of CP satellites. From 1949 to 1952 Pospíšil was the general secretary of the People's Party and from 1968 to 1973 the chairman of the party as successor of the priest Josef Plojhar. From 1951 to 1957 Pospíšil was the minister of transport and electricity. He was later minister without portfolio.
