= Vehicle registration plates of the Czech Republic =

Czech Republic / Czechia
- A Czech registration plate from 2004 to now on, in which A = Prague
- Country: Czech Republic
- Country code: CZ

Current series
- Size: 520 mm × 110 mm 20.5 in × 4.3 in
- Serial format: 1A2 3456 (A being the regional code)
- Colour (front): Black on white
- Colour (rear): Black on white

As of the year 2019 there are two different valid systems of vehicle registration plates in the Czech Republic.

== Format ==
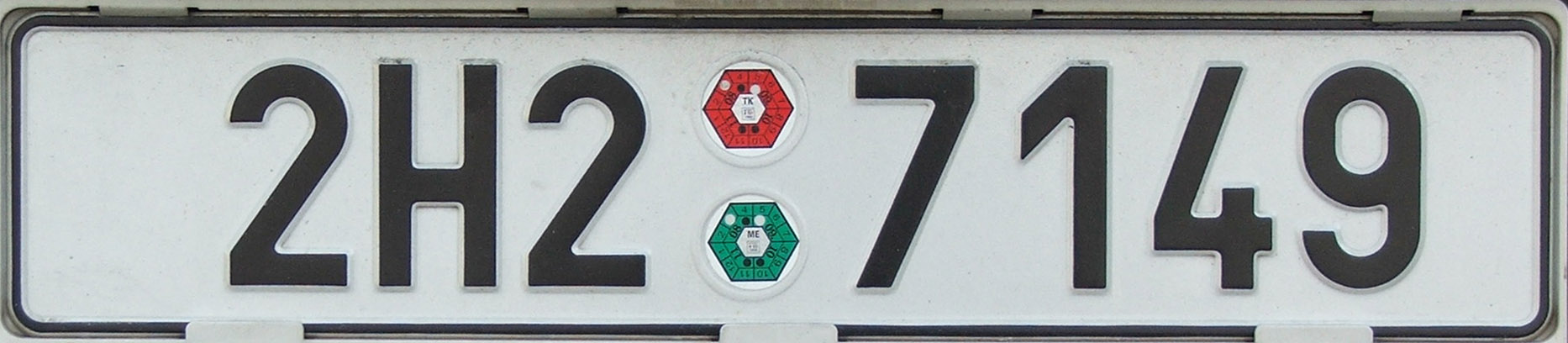
A Czech registration plate from 2001 to 2004, in which H = Hradec Králové Region

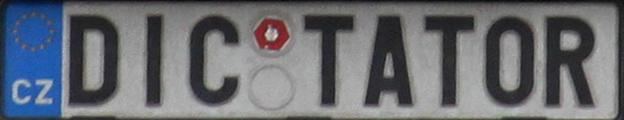
A custom registration plate: the 'O' of DIC-TAT0R is actually a zero

The latest system of Czech vehicle registration plate was introduced between 29 June and 17 July 2001. In this system, the first letter from the left represents the region (kraj), and this is combined with numbers issued in series from 1x0 0001, where x is the letter representing the region.

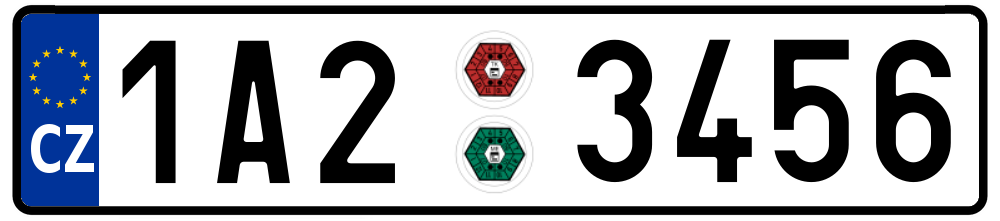

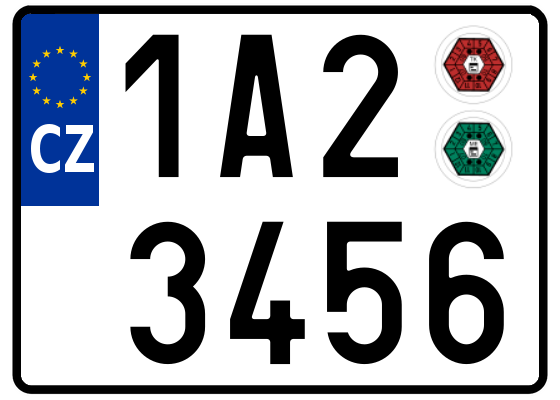

By 2009, Prague (A) has reached the combination 9x9 9999 in its respective series; consequently it then started issuing plates which included a two-letter combination in the format 1xa 0000 to 9xa 9999, where x is the regional letter and a is a letter in alphabetical order (so that 1AA 9999 is followed by 1AB 0000, and so on). Shortly after that the Central-Bohemian region came. As of the beginning of the summer 2014, the South Moravian (B) and Moravian-Silesian in the November, lastly in April 2019 the Usti region. Regions were also issuing registration marks with two-letter combinations.

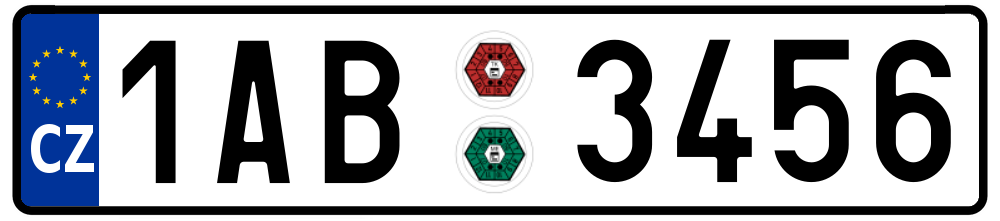

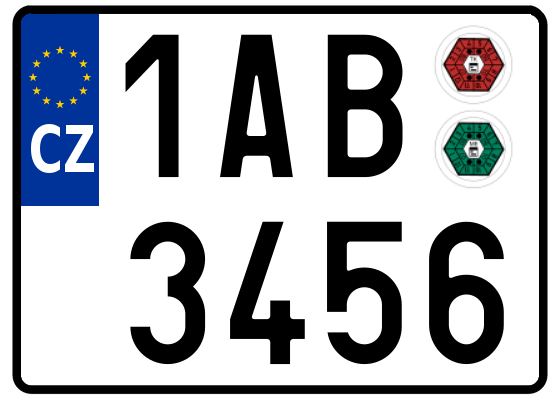

In mid-2023, the serial of new license plates issued in the Prague region added a letter.

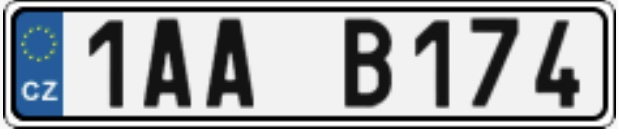

Motorcycle plates have the 2-line format 1x 0001, where x is the letter representing the region.

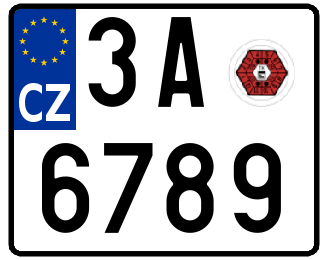

Since 2004 with the accession of the Czech Republic to the European Union, a blue European strip with the letters CZ and European stars have been added.

As of 1 January 2015, registration numbers are not changed if the owner of a vehicle moves to another region or if the vehicle is re-registered to a new owner residing in a different region. New numbers (with the corresponding code of the region of re-registration) are assigned only in the case of damage, loss, or theft of a registration plate.

Since 2017 custom ("personalized") plates have been available, against payment of a special fee of 5 000 CZK (around 222 USD) per plate, i.e for a car it would cost 10 000 CZK and for a motorcycle 5 000 CZK. These have the format XXX-XXXXX (i.e. they have one more character than ordinary plates) and must contain at least one number. The letters G, CH, O, Q and W may not be used. The license plate cannot contain any abusive or offensive words.

== Regional letters ==
Map of the Czech Republic with regions (coded)

The letter used to represent each region is derived from its Regional capital, with the exception of the Central Bohemian Region (whose capital, Prague, is a separate region in its own right). Typically, this is the first letter in the name, but sometimes a different letter is used to ensure only one region uses a given letter or to avoid the letter O due to it resembling the number 0.

Code	Region	Czech Name	Regional capital
A (01)	Capital City Prague	Hlavní město PrAha	Prague
B (02)	South Moravia	Jihomoravský kraj	Brno
C (03)	South Bohemia	Jihočeský kraj	České Budějovice
E (04)	Pardubice	Pardubický kraj	PardubicE
H (05)	Hradec Králové	KrálovéHradecký kraj	Hradec Králové
J (06)	Highland (Vysočina) Region	Kraj Vysočina	Jihlava
K (07)	Karlovy Vary	Karlovarský kraj	Karlovy Vary
L (08)	Liberec	Liberecký kraj	Liberec
M (09)	Olomouc	OloMoucký kraj	OloMouc
P (10)	Plzeň	Plzeňský kraj	Plzeň
S (11)	Central Bohemia	Středočeský kraj	Prague
T (12)	Moravia-Silesia	Moravskoslezský kraj	OsTrava
U (13)	Ústí nad Labem	Ústecký kraj	Ústí nad Labem
Z (14)	Zlín	Zlínský kraj	Zlín
V	Historic vehicles (From 2006 they have a format of NNV XXXX, where NN means the number code, V the letter V and X a serial number)		
Numbers	Military vehicles, and diplomatic corps		

== History ==
=== 1932 - 1954 ===
This system was introduced in Czechoslovakia in 1932. The first letters are represented by region.

- Composition (newer form: 1945 – 1954):

X-NN-NNN, white on black

- Composition (older form: 1932 – 1939):

X-NNNNN, black on white

=== 1954 - 2001 ===
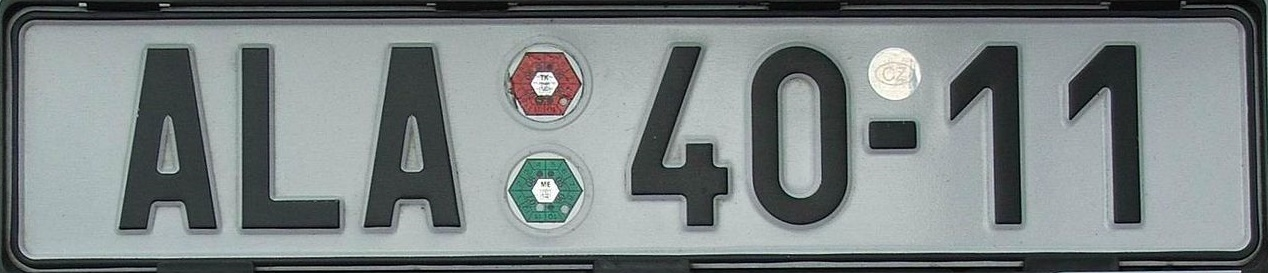
Czech registration plate 1992-2001 (here A = Prague registration)

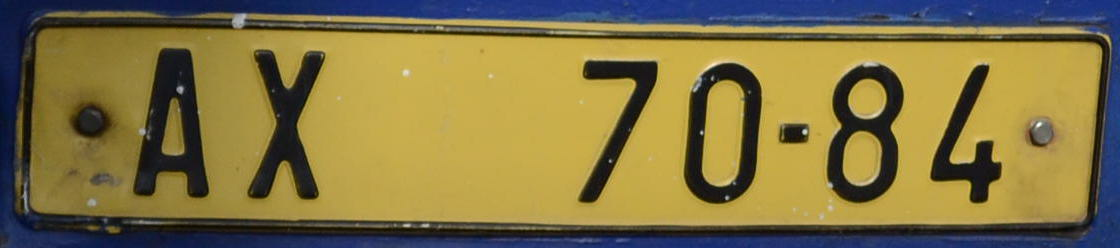
Czechoslovak registration plate for a commercially used vehicle 1986-1992

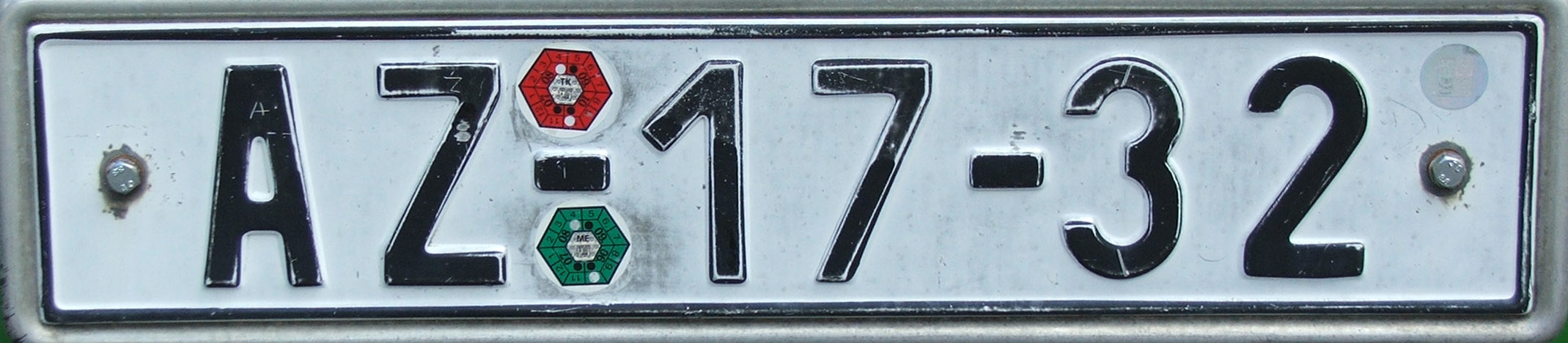
Czechoslovak registration from the 1970s, still valid in the Czech Republic

This system was introduced in Czechoslovakia in 1960. After the dissolution of Czechoslovakia, the Slovak Republic introduced a new system of car registration plates in 1997 while the Czech Republic kept issuing the old one until 2001. In the old system, the two first letters represented the district (okres). Registrations in Prague began with A, while the vehicles used by the government had registration plates beginning with AA.

- Composition (older form: 1960–1984):

XX-NN-NN or XXX-NN-NN

- Composition (newer form: 1984–2001):

XX NN-NN or XXX NN-NN

(X = letters, N = numbers.)

Commercially used vehicles and heavy goods vehicle had a yellow background. Vehicles with foreign owners had a blue background and yellow letters.

==== List of districts ====
Code	Region	Code	Region
A	Praha	MO	Most
AA	For vehicles used by the government (until 1989)	NA	Náchod
BE	Beroun	NB	Nymburk
BI	Brno-venkov (only ever used with a yellow background for heavy goods vehicles)	NJ	Nový Jičín
BK	Blansko	OC	Olomouc
BM	Brno-město	OL	Olomouc
BN	Benešov	OM	Olomouc
BO	Brno-venkov	OP	Opava
BR	Bruntál	OS	Ostrava-město
BS	Brno-město	OT	Ostrava-město
BV	Břeclav	OV	Ostrava-město
BZ	Brno-město	PA	Pardubice
CB	České Budějovice	PB	Příbram
CE	České Budějovice	PC	Praha-západ
CH	Cheb	PE	Pelhřímov
CK	Český Krumlov	PH	Praha-východ
CL	Česká Lípa	PI	Písek
CR	Chrudim	PJ	Plzeň-jih
CV	Chomutov	PM	Plzeň-město
DC	Děčín	PN	Plzeň-město
DD	Diplomatic corps	PR	Přerov
DO	Domažlice	PS	Plzeň-sever
FI	Frýdek-Místek (never used)	PT	Prachatice
FM	Frýdek-Místek	PU	Pardubice
GT	Gottwaldov (until 1989, town then renamed to Zlín)	PV	Prostějov
GV	Gottwaldov (until 1989)	PY	Praha-východ
HB	Havlíčkův Brod	PZ	Praha-západ
HK	Hradec Králové	RA	Rakovník
HO	Hodonín	RK	Rychnov nad Kněžnou
HR	Hradec Králové	RO	Rokycany
JC	Jičín	SM	Semily
JE	Jeseník (from 1996)	SO	Sokolov
JI	Jihlava	ST	Strakonice
JH	Jindřichův Hradec	SU	Šumperk
JN	Jablonec nad Nisou	SY	Svitavy
KA	Karviná	TA	Tábor
KD	Kladno	TC	Tachov
KH	Kutná Hora	TP	Teplice
KI	Karviná	TR	Třebíč
KL	Kladno	TU	Trutnov
KM	Kroměříž	UH	Uherské Hradiště
KO	Kolín	UL	Ústí nad Labem
KR	Karlovy Vary	UO	Ústí nad Orlici
KT	Klatovy	US	Ústí nad Labem (never used)
KV	Karlovy Vary	VS	Vsetín
LB	Liberec	VY	Vyškov
LI	Liberec	XX	Consular corps
LN	Louny	ZL	Zlín (since 1990, previously GT/GV - Gottwaldov)
LT	Litoměřice	ZN	Znojmo
MB	Mladá Boleslav	ZR	Žďár nad Sázavou
ME	Mělník	Numbers	Military vehicle

== Special license plates ==
=== Diplomatic registration plates ===
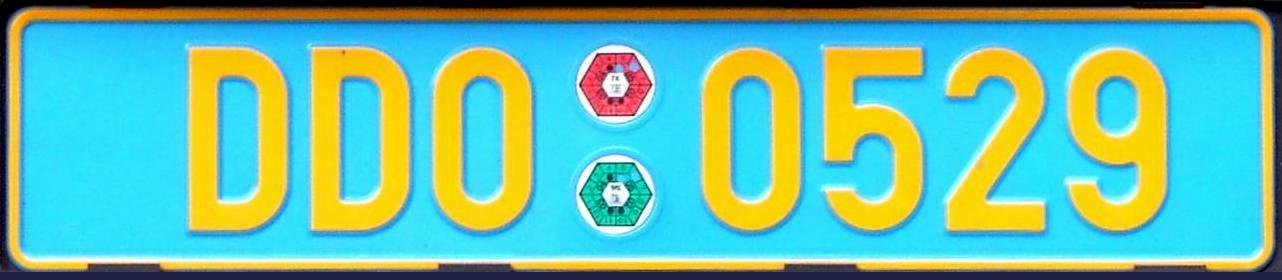
Diplomatic plate – old system

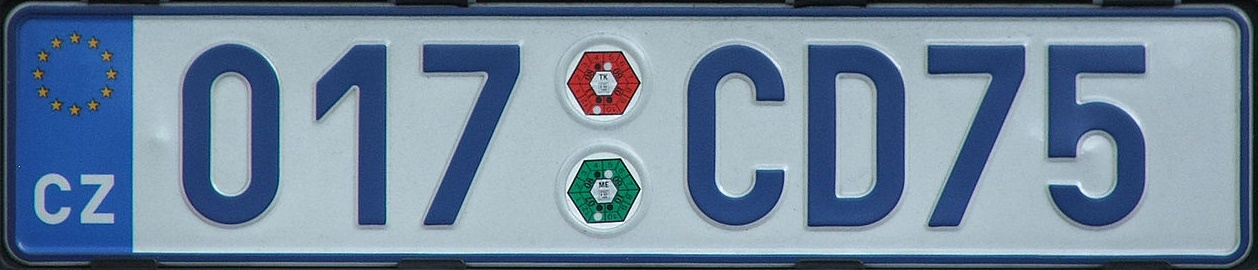
Diplomatic plate – new system

Until 2001 diplomatic plates (as well as those on cars owned by foreign residents) in the Czech Republic used a blue background with yellow letters. Foreigners (Czechoslovakia) used same plates as DC plates except they did not use the DD or XX codes, and non-diplomatic personnel used a XX code instead. Since 2001 the yellow on blue plates have been replaced by plates with blue letters on a white background.

=== Others ===
Commercial vehicles of have black letters with a yellow background, military have numbers only, rentals have red letters on a white background (discontinued), historic vehicles use green letters on a white background (always using "V" as a prefix), trailers have the district codes put in the middle (99 XXX-99 or 99 XX-99) and technical embassies use red letters on a yellow background (discontinued).

=== Gallery ===
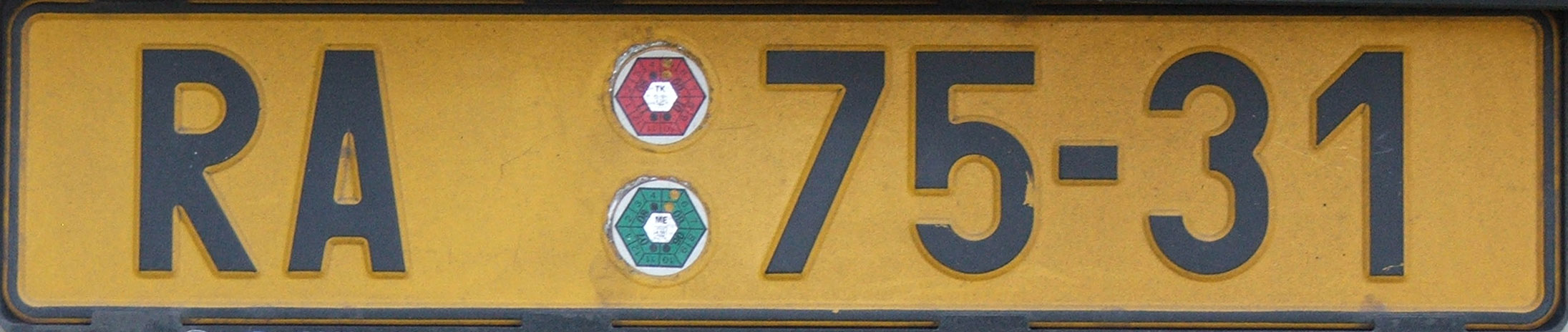
Utilitary vehicle registration from the 90s

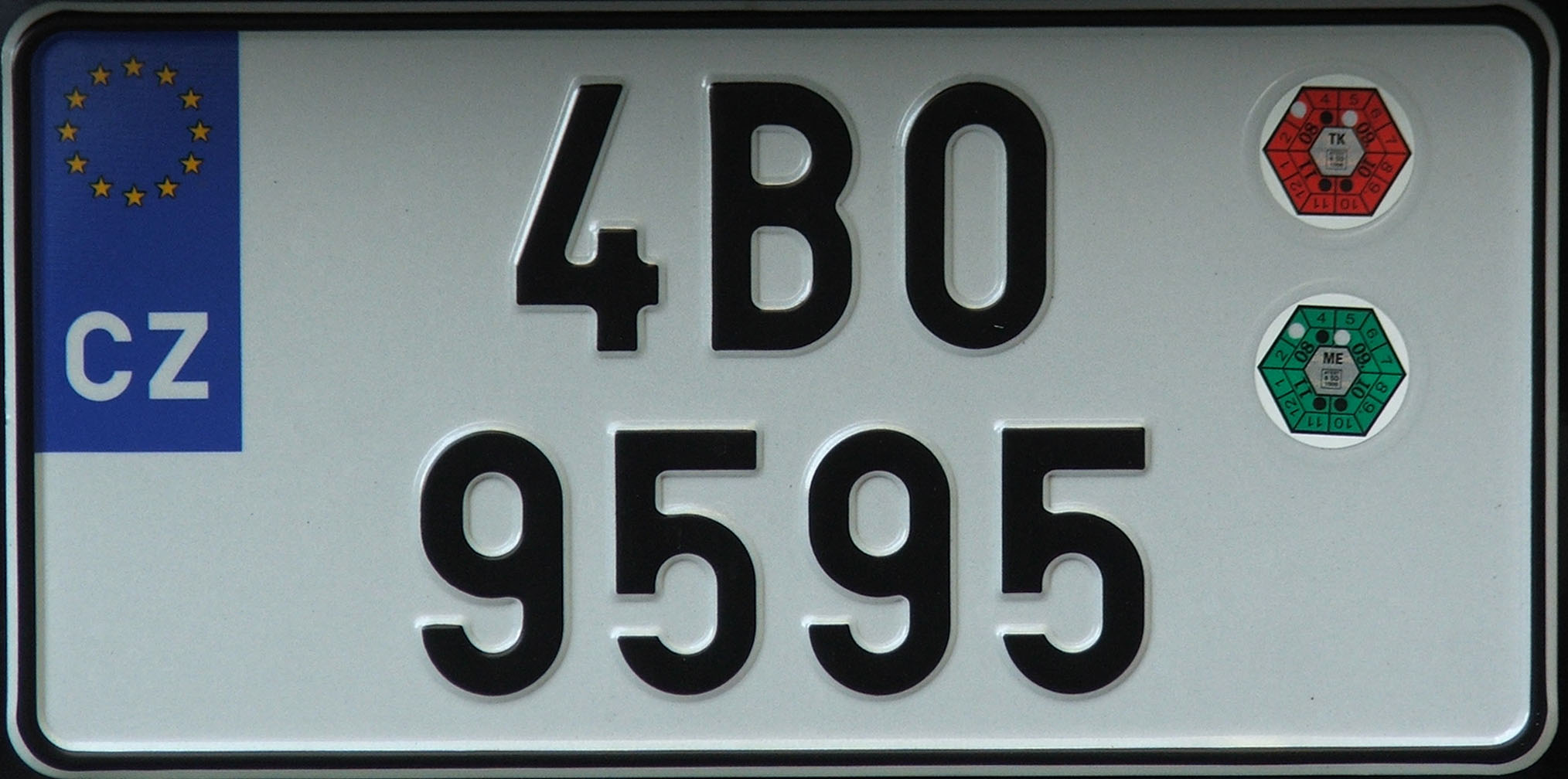
US-size standard plate

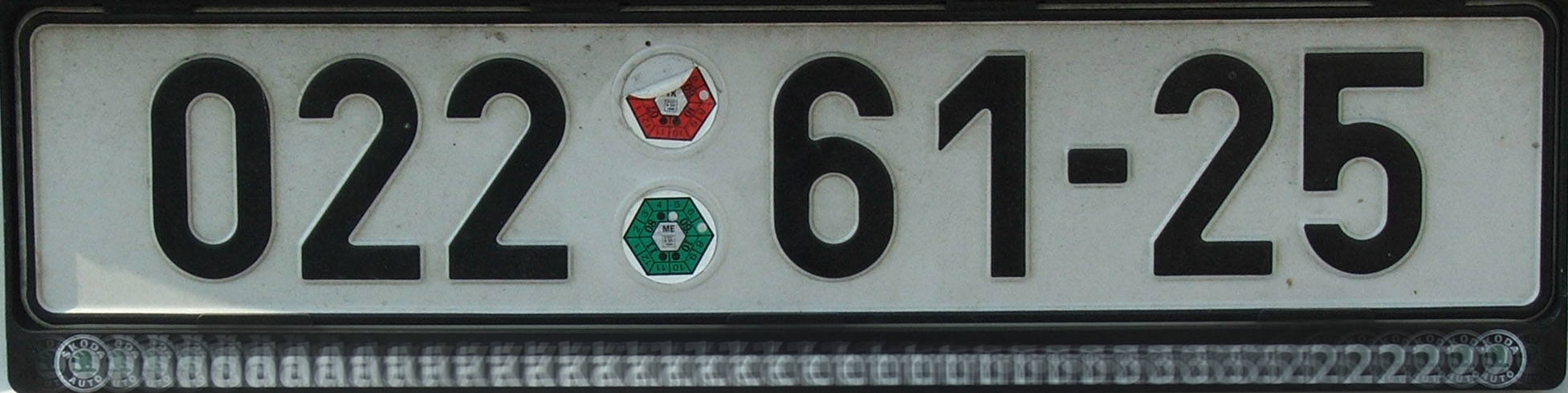
Military vehicle registration

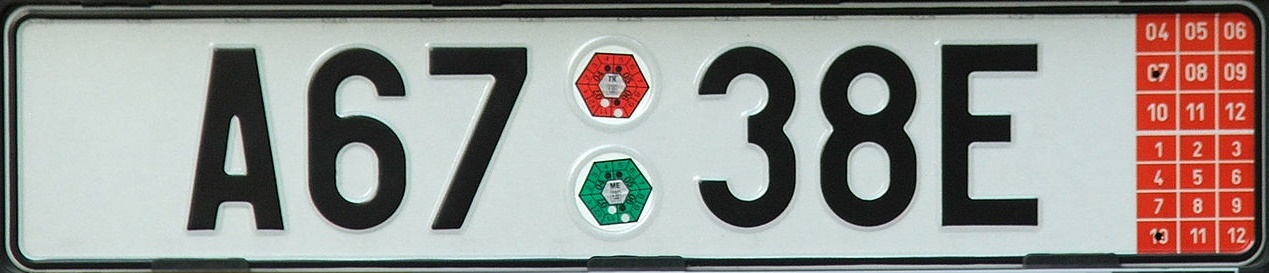
Export plate

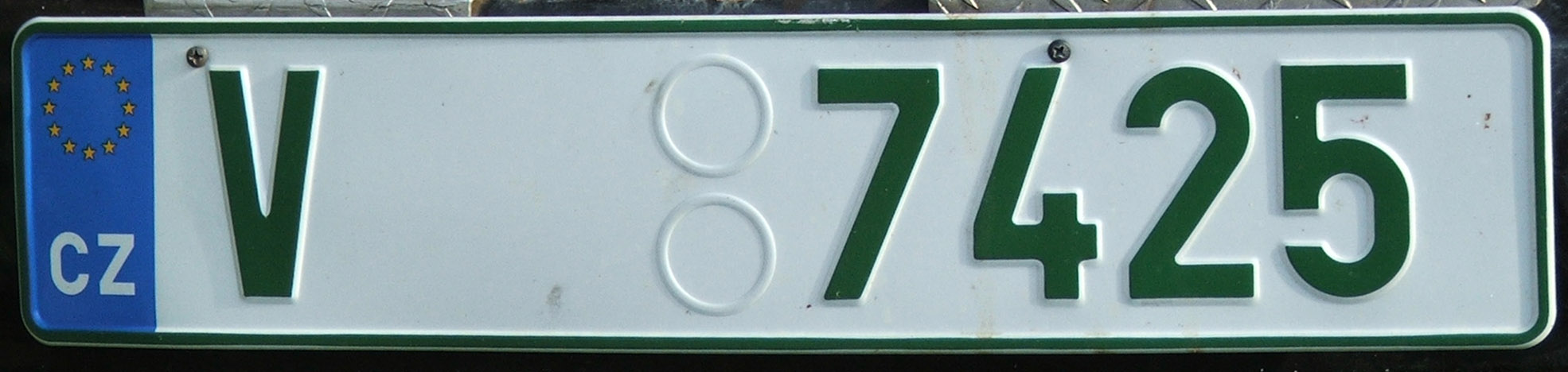
Antique vehicle registration

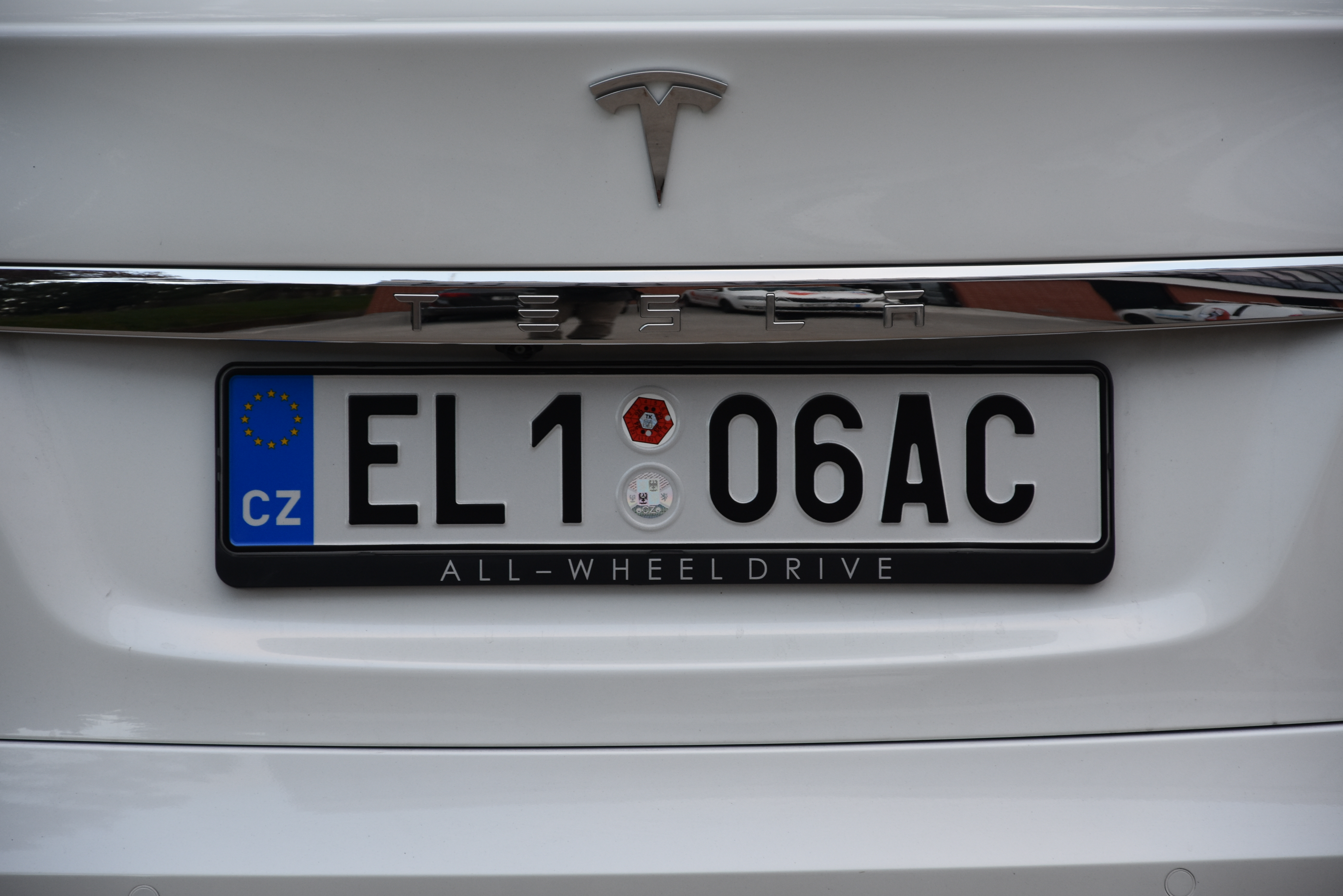
Electric car registration
