= Králíky (administrative district) =

Administrative division of the Czech Republic

Administrative district of the municipality with extended powers of Králíky Správní obvod obce s rozšířenou působností Králíky
- Administrative district of municipality with extended powers
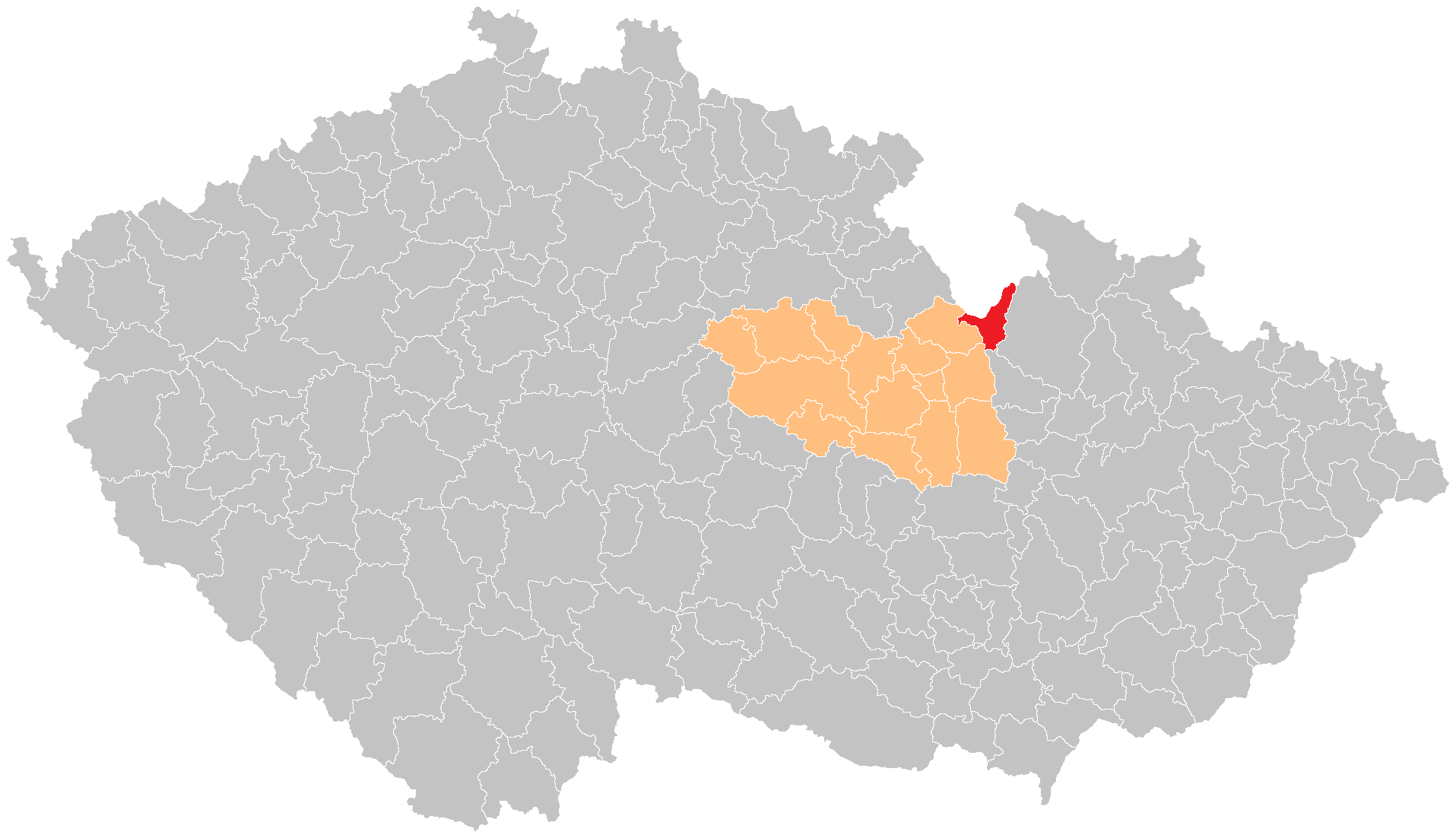
- Location in the Pardubice Region within the Czech Republic
- Coordinates: 50°4′N 16°44′E
- Country: Czech Republic
- Region: Pardubice
- District: Ústí nad Orlicí
- Municipality with extended powers: Králíky

Area
  - Total: 158.6 km^{2} (61.2 sq mi)

Population (2024)
  - Total: 8,591
  - Density: 54.17/km^{2} (140.3/sq mi)
- Time zone: UTC+1 (CET)
  - Summer (DST): UTC+2 (CEST)
- Municipalities: 5
- * Cities and towns: 1
- * Market towns: 1

The administrative district of the municipality with extended powers of Králíky (abbreviated AD MEP Králíky; Czech: Správní obvod obce s rozšířenou působností Králíky, SO ORP Králíky) is an administrative district of municipality with extended powers in Ústí nad Orlicí District in the Pardubice Region of the Czech Republic. It has existed since 1 January 2003, when the districts were replaced administratively. It includes 5 municipalities which have a combined population of about 8,000, making it the least populated administrative district in the country.

== Municipalities ==
Cities and towns are in bold.

Municipality	Population	Area (km^{2)}	Density
Červená Voda	3,007	47.34	64
Dolní Morava	430	36.57	12
**Králíky**	4,126	52.78	78
Lichkov	481	9.13	53
Mladkov	547	12.80	43

== Demographics ==
Historical population

Year	Pop.	±%
1869	19,749	—
1880	19,564	−0.9%
1890	19,254	−1.6%
1900	18,085	−6.1%
1910	17,465	−3.4%

Year	Pop.	±%
1921	15,099	−13.5%
1930	15,726	+4.2%
1950	8,958	−43.0%
1961	9,433	+5.3%
1970	9,731	+3.2%

Year	Pop.	±%
1980	9,714	−0.2%
1991	9,420	−3.0%
2001	9,500	+0.8%
2011	8,712	−8.3%
2021	8,114	−6.9%

Source: Censuses
