= Mariánské Lázně Airport =

Mariánské Lázně Airport Letiště Mariánské Lázně
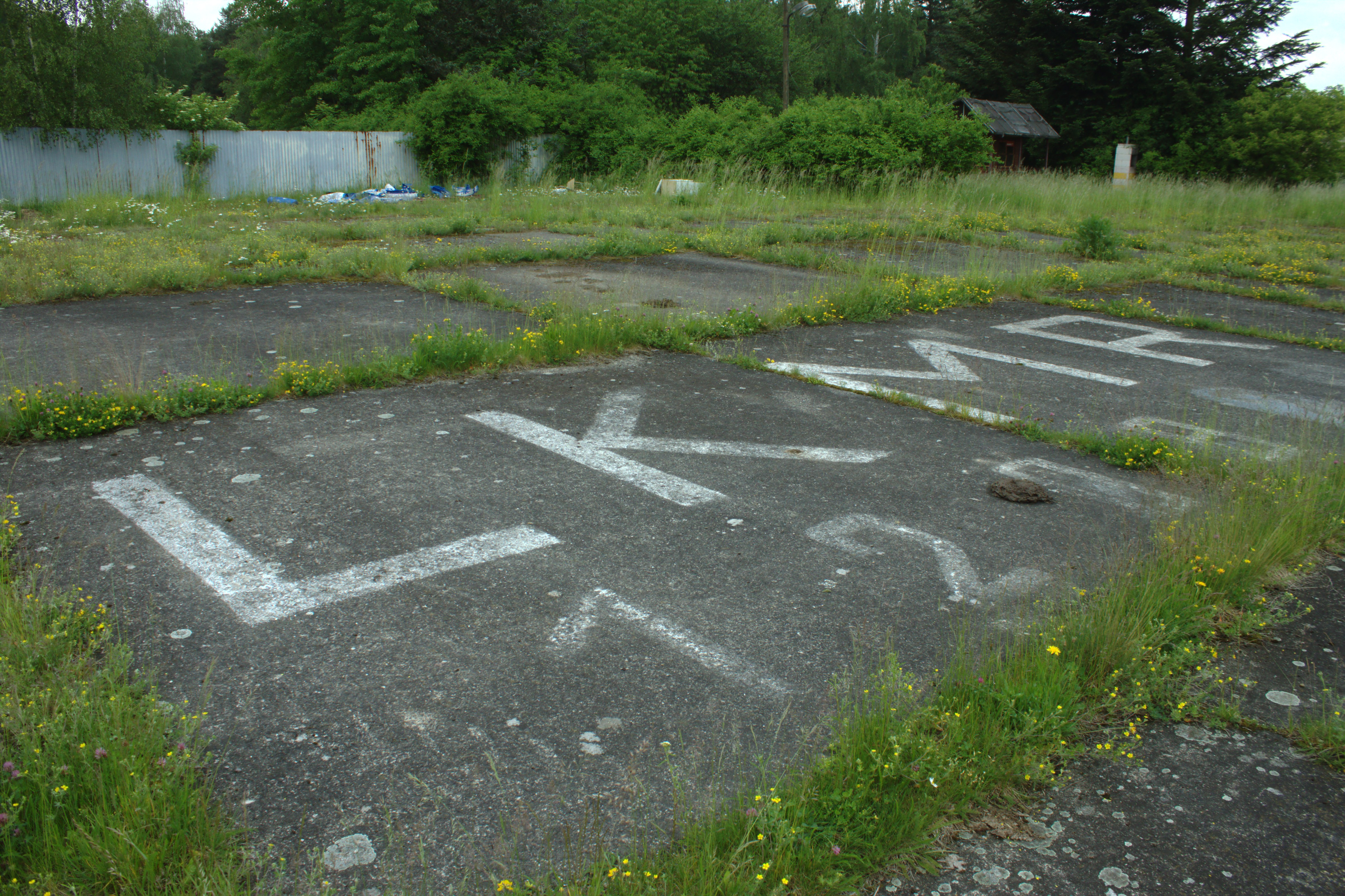
- IATA: MKA; ICAO: LKMR

Summary
- Location: Mariánské Lázně, Czech Republic
- Elevation AMSL: 1,771 ft / 540 m
- Coordinates: 49°55′24″N 12°43′36″E

Map
- Location of airport in the Czech Republic

Runways
Direction	Length		Surface
Direction	m	ft	Surface
	1,075	3,527

Mariánské Lázně Airport (IATA: MKA, ICAO: LKMR, Czech: Letiště Mariánské Lázně) is an airport serving Mariánské Lázně in the Karlovy Vary Region of the Czech Republic.

== Facilities ==
The airport resides at an elevation of 1,771 feet (540 m) above mean sea level. It has a runway which is 1,075 metres (3,527 ft) in length.
