= Starý Vestec =

- Municipality
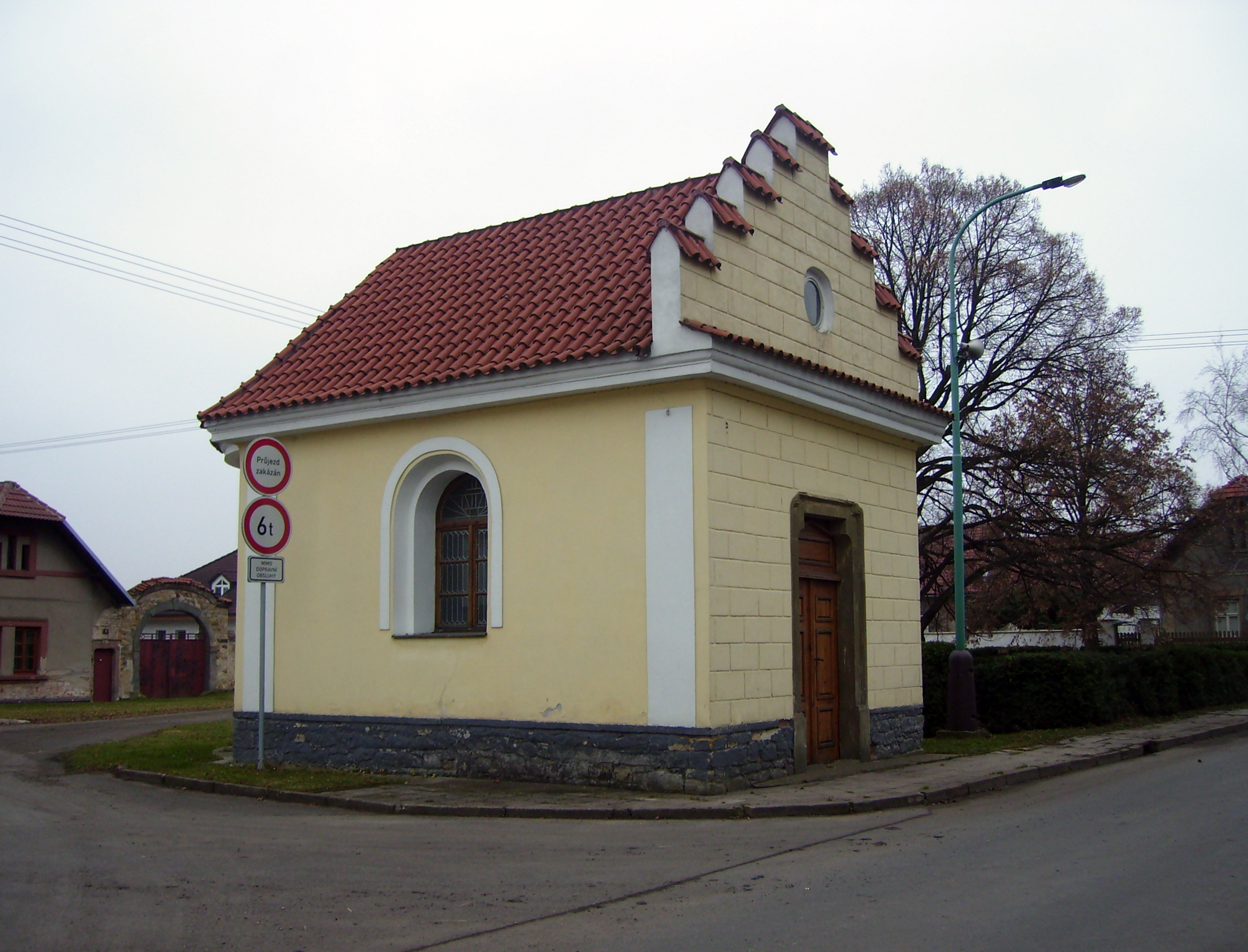
- Chapel of Saint Wenceslaus

- Flag Coat of arms

- Location in the Czech Republic
- Coordinates: 50°8′38″N 14°50′46″E
- Country: Czech Republic
- Region: Central Bohemian
- District: Nymburk
- First mentioned: 1320

Area
  - Total: 3.55 km^{2} (1.37 sq mi)
- Elevation: 188 m (617 ft)

Population (2026-01-01)
  - Total: 239
  - Density: 67.3/km^{2} (174/sq mi)
- Time zone: UTC+1 (CET)
  - Summer (DST): UTC+2 (CEST)
- Postal code: 289 16
- Website: www.staryvestec.cz

Starý Vestec is a municipality and village in Nymburk District in the Central Bohemian Region of the Czech Republic. It has about 200 inhabitants.

== Demographics ==
Historical population
Year	Pop.	±%
1869	240	—
1880	268	+11.7%
1890	249	−7.1%
1900	261	+4.8%
1910	307	+17.6%
1921	311	+1.3%
1930	292	−6.1%
1950	242	−17.1%
1961	212	−12.4%
1970	183	−13.7%
1980	166	−9.3%
1991	171	+3.0%
2001	147	−14.0%
2011	188	+27.9%
2021	196	+4.3%
Source: Censuses
