= Sokolov (administrative district) =

Administrative district in the Czech Republic

Administrative district of the municipality with extended powers of Sokolov Správní obvod obce s rozšířenou působností Sokolov
- Administrative district of municipality with extended powers
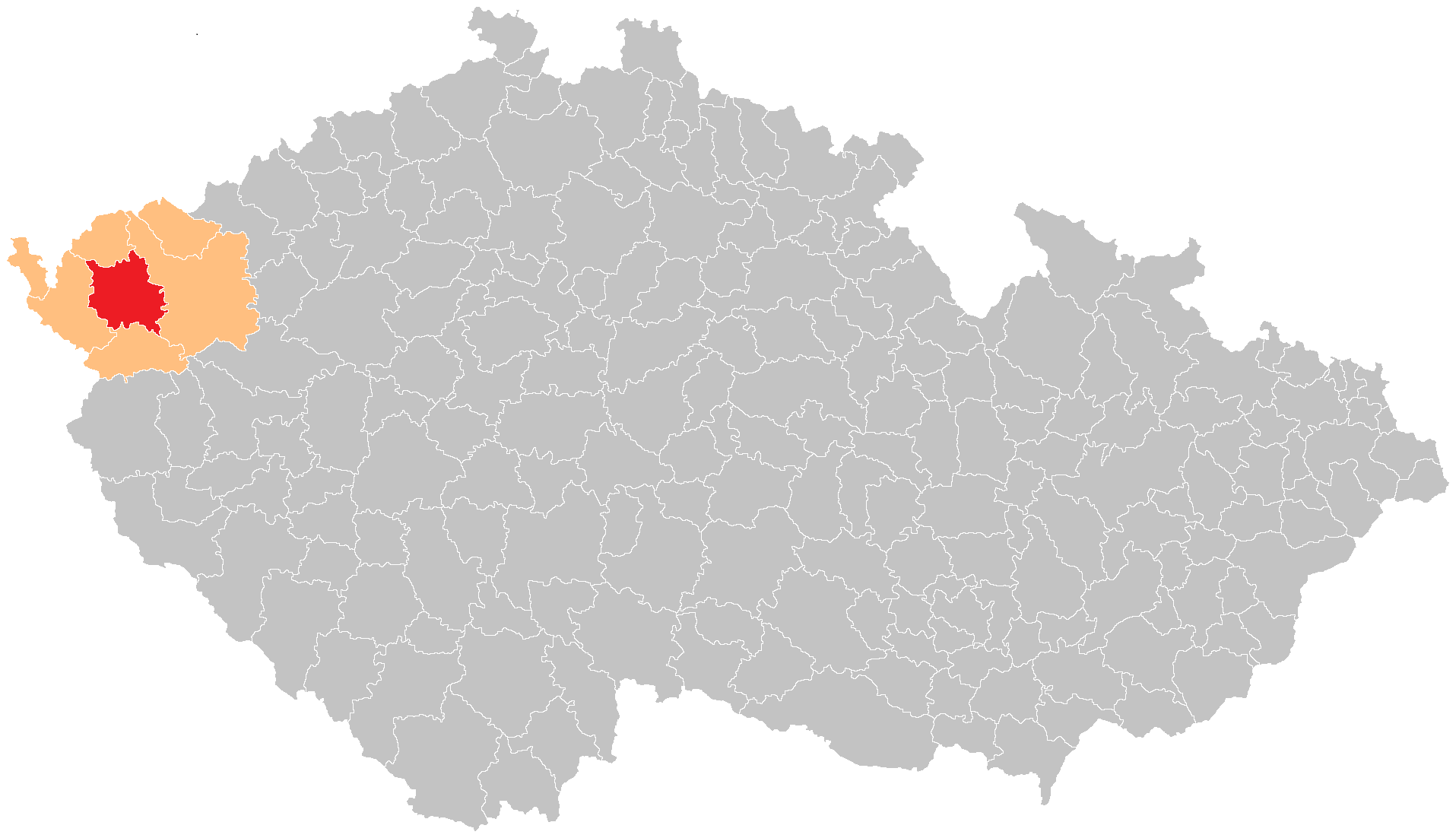
- Location in the Karlovy Vary Region within the Czech Republic
- Coordinates: 50°10′N 12°40′E
- Country: Czech Republic
- Region: Karlovy Vary
- District: Karlovy Vary
- Municipality with extended powers: Sokolov

Area
  - Total: 489.19 km^{2} (188.88 sq mi)

Population (2024)
  - Total: 72,913
  - Density: 149.05/km^{2} (386.03/sq mi)
- Time zone: UTC+1 (CET)
  - Summer (DST): UTC+2 (CEST)
- Municipalities: 30
- * Cities and towns: 9
- * Market towns: 1

The administrative district of the municipality with extended powers of Sokolov (abbreviated AD MEP Sokolov; Czech: Správní obvod obce s rozšířenou působností Sokolov, SO ORP Sokolov) is an administrative district of municipality with extended powers in Sokolov District in the Karlovy Vary Region of the Czech Republic. It has existed since 1 January 2003, when the districts were replaced administratively. It includes 30 municipalities which have a combined population of almost 73,000.

== Municipalities ==
Towns are in bold, and market towns in italics.

Municipality	Population	Area (km^{2)}	Density
**Březová**	2,604	59.59	44
Bukovany	1,528	3.10	492
Citice	871	5.41	160
Dasnice	250	4.04	62
Dolní Nivy	351	18.82	19
Dolní Rychnov	1,318	5.09	258
**Habartov**	4,717	21.39	220
**Horní Slavkov**	5,438	36.87	147
Chlum Svaté Maří	314	4.70	67
**Chodov**	12,649	14.26	887
Josefov	418	8.33	50
Kaceřov	417	5.72	73
Krajková	924	35.23	26
Královské Poříčí	761	12.20	62
**Krásno**	701	25.36	28
**Kynšperk nad Ohří**	4,496	23.31	192
Libavské Údolí	535	2.29	233
**Loket**	3,071	26.73	114
Lomnice	1,356	13.85	98
Nová Ves	199	26.96	7.4
**Nové Sedlo**	2,557	16.98	150
Rovná	347	44.11	7.9
**Sokolov**	22,155	22.92	966
Staré Sedlo	809	6.50	124
Svatava	1,659	11.59	143
Šabina	394	5.07	78
Tatrovice	164	10.13	16
Těšovice	257	1.19	215
Vintířov	1,232	14.36	86
Vřesová	421	3.13	134

== Demographics ==
Historical population

Year	Pop.	±%
1869	57,648	—
1880	62,753	+8.9%
1890	70,123	+11.7%
1900	84,882	+21.0%
1910	91,539	+7.8%

Year	Pop.	±%
1921	90,369	−1.3%
1930	96,941	+7.3%
1950	53,160	−45.2%
1961	64,707	+21.7%
1970	74,564	+15.2%

Year	Pop.	±%
1980	80,514	+8.0%
1991	78,545	−2.4%
2001	79,501	+1.2%
2011	76,806	−3.4%
2021	71,776	−6.5%

Source: Censuses
