= Kojátky =

- Municipality
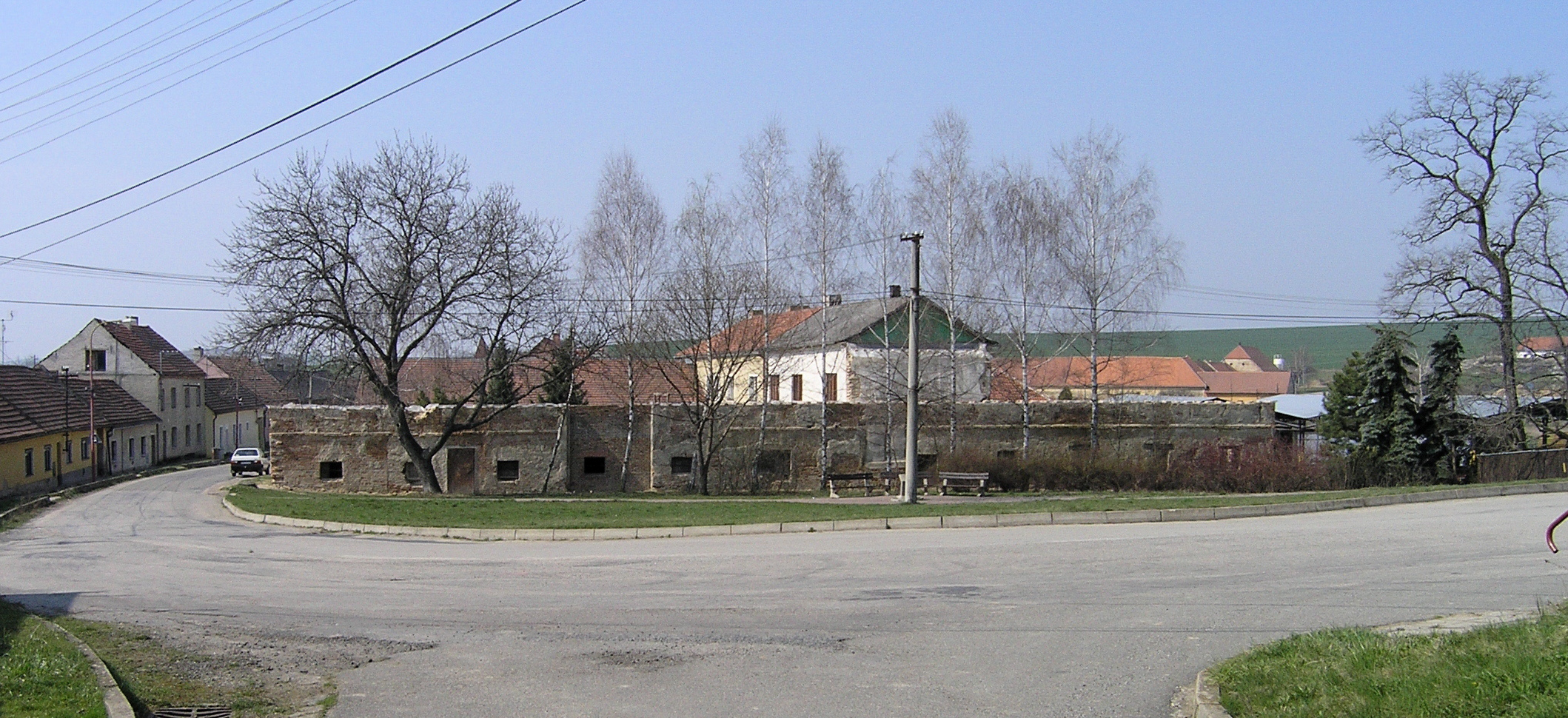
- Centre of Kojátky

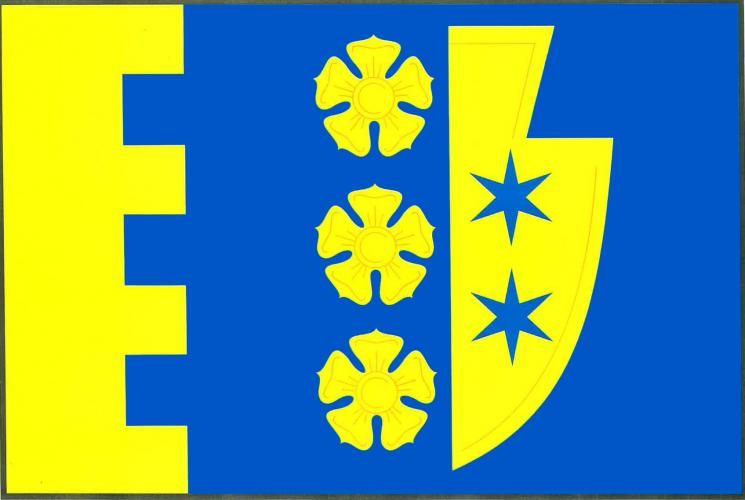
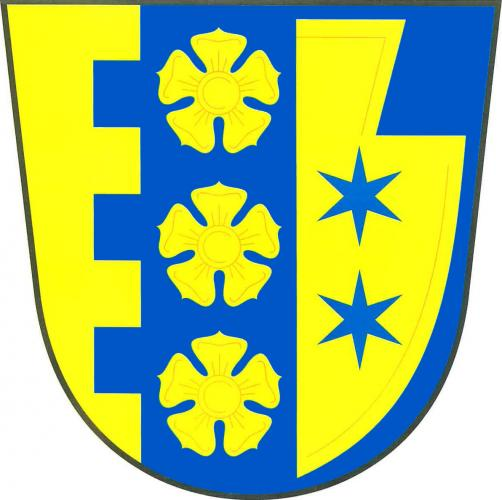
- Flag Coat of arms

- Location in the Czech Republic
- Coordinates: 49°10′19″N 17°1′34″E
- Country: Czech Republic
- Region: South Moravian
- District: Vyškov
- First mentioned: 1358

Area
  - Total: 5.82 km^{2} (2.25 sq mi)
- Elevation: 249 m (817 ft)

Population (2026-01-01)
  - Total: 360
  - Density: 62/km^{2} (160/sq mi)
- Time zone: UTC+1 (CET)
  - Summer (DST): UTC+2 (CEST)
- Postal code: 685 01
- Website: www.kojatky.cz

Kojátky is a municipality and village in Vyškov District in the South Moravian Region of the Czech Republic. It has about 400 inhabitants.

== Administrative division ==
Kojátky consists of two municipal parts (in brackets population according to the 2021 census):

- Kojátky (261)
- Šardičky (101)

== Etymology ==
The name is derived from the personal name Kojata.

== Geography ==
Kojátky is located about 12 kilometres (7 mi) south of Vyškov and 27 km (17 mi) east of Brno. It lies in an agricultural landscape in the Litenčice Hills. The highest point is a nameless hill at 347 m (1,138 ft) above sea level.

== History ==
The first written mention of Kojátky is from 1358. Šardičky was first mentioned in 1356. Both villages were owned by various lesser noblemen and had different owners until 1714, when their owner became Knight Bernard Brabanský of Chobřany.

== Demographics ==
Historical population

Year	Pop.	±%
1869	479	—
1880	528	+10.2%
1890	553	+4.7%
1900	569	+2.9%
1910	622	+9.3%

Year	Pop.	±%
1921	660	+6.1%
1930	661	+0.2%
1950	526	−20.4%
1961	531	+1.0%
1970	419	−21.1%

Year	Pop.	±%
1980	381	−9.1%
1991	331	−13.1%
2001	349	+5.4%
2011	327	−6.3%
2021	362	+10.7%

Source: Censuses

== Transport ==
There are no railways or major roads passing through the municipality.

== Sights ==
The only protected cultural monument in the municipality is a statue of Saint John of Nepomuk. It is a Baroque statue from the 18th century.
