= Milonice (Vyškov District) =

- Municipality
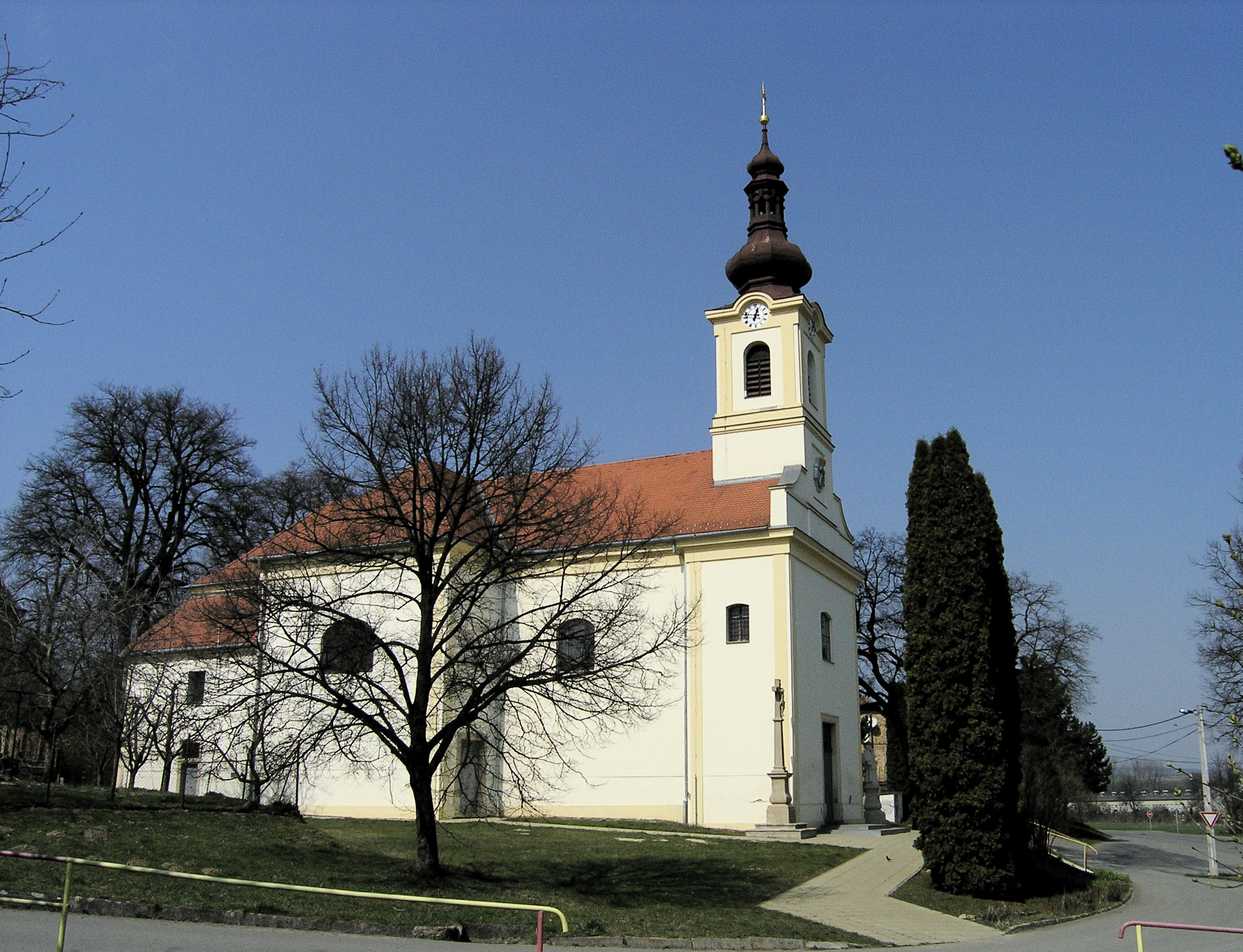
- Church of Saints Peter and Paul

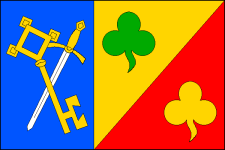
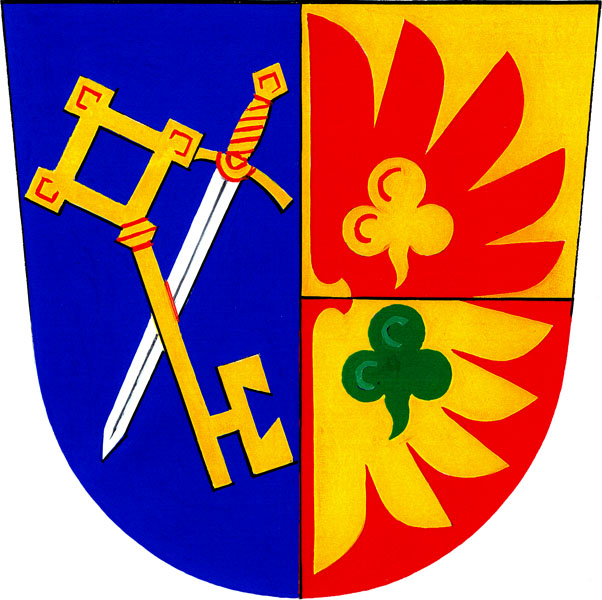
- Flag Coat of arms

- Location in the Czech Republic
- Coordinates: 49°9′34″N 17°4′16″E
- Country: Czech Republic
- Region: South Moravian
- District: Vyškov
- First mentioned: 1349

Area
  - Total: 4.98 km^{2} (1.92 sq mi)
- Elevation: 250 m (820 ft)

Population (2026-01-01)
  - Total: 376
  - Density: 75.5/km^{2} (196/sq mi)
- Time zone: UTC+1 (CET)
  - Summer (DST): UTC+2 (CEST)
- Postal code: 683 33
- Website: www.milonice.cz

Milonice is a municipality and village in Vyškov District in the South Moravian Region of the Czech Republic. It has about 400 inhabitants.

Milonice lies approximately 14 kilometres (9 mi) south-east of Vyškov, 34 km (21 mi) east of Brno, and 218 km (135 mi) south-east of Prague.

== Demographics ==
Historical population
Year	Pop.	±%
1869	403	—
1880	412	+2.2%
1890	423	+2.7%
1900	533	+26.0%
1910	523	−1.9%
1921	531	+1.5%
1930	588	+10.7%
1950	532	−9.5%
1961	584	+9.8%
1970	506	−13.4%
1980	394	−22.1%
1991	343	−12.9%
2001	337	−1.7%
2011	348	+3.3%
2021	340	−2.3%
Source: Censuses
