= Mouřínov =

- Municipality
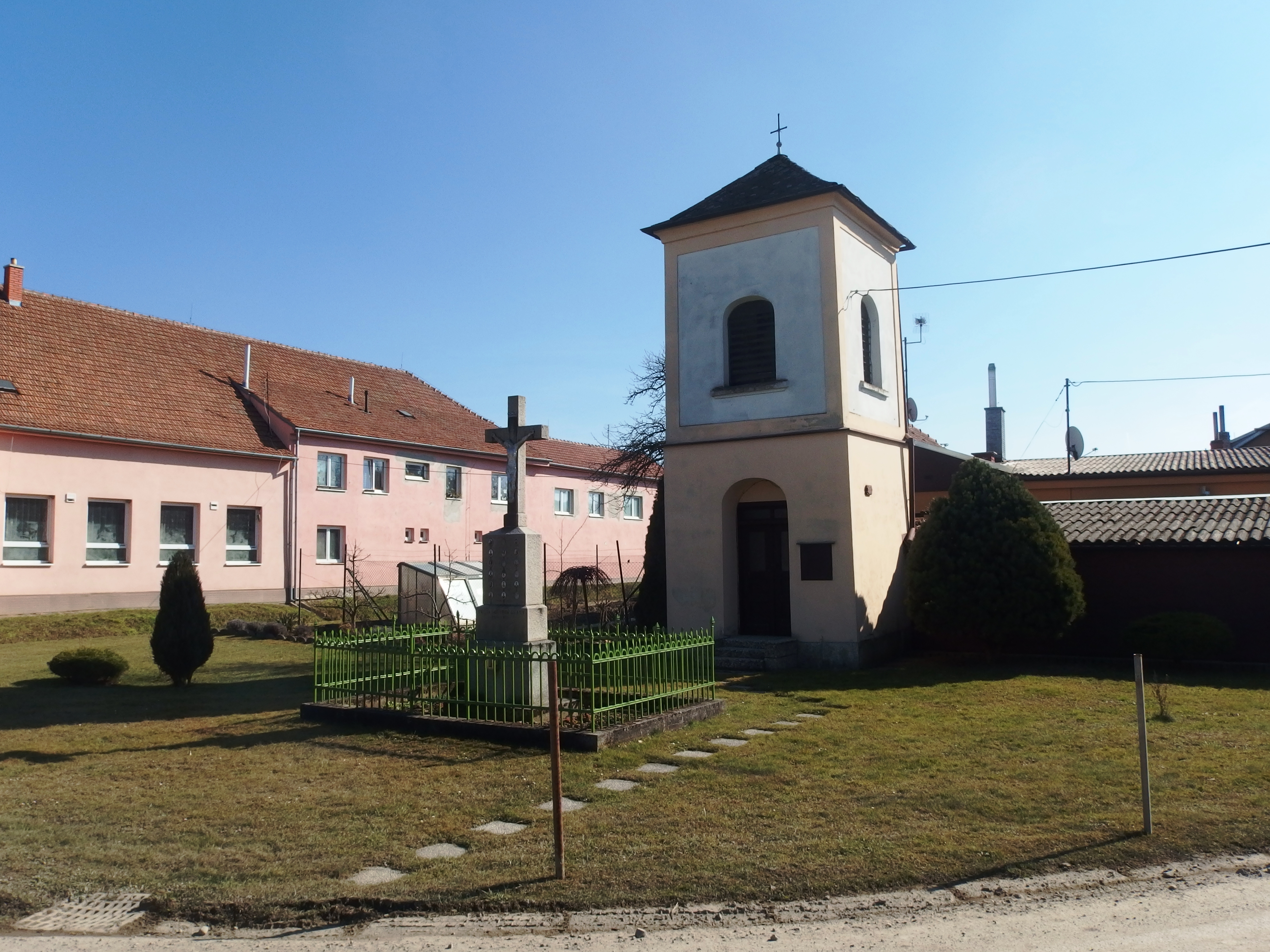
- Memorial to the victims of World War I and a belfry

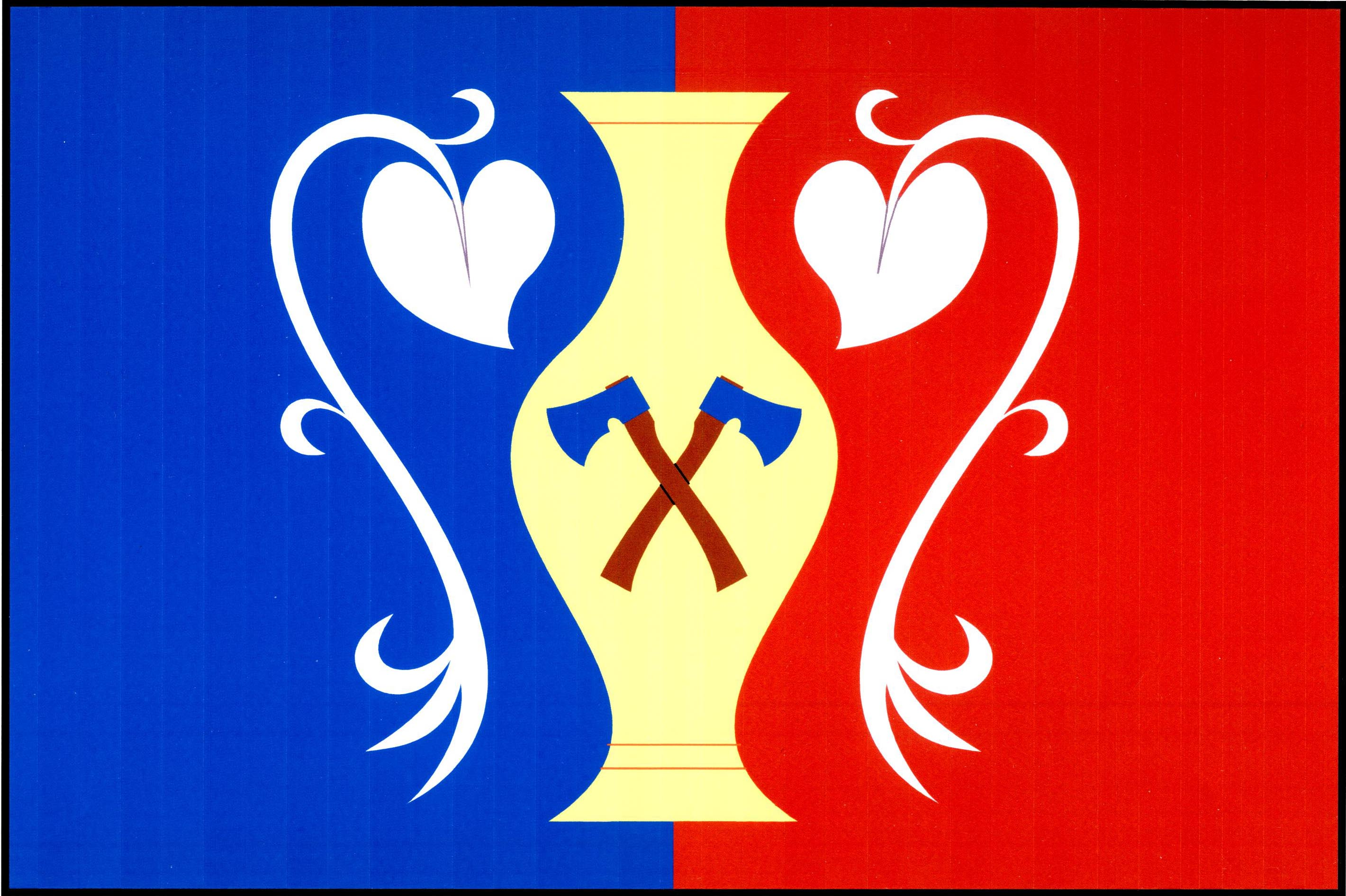
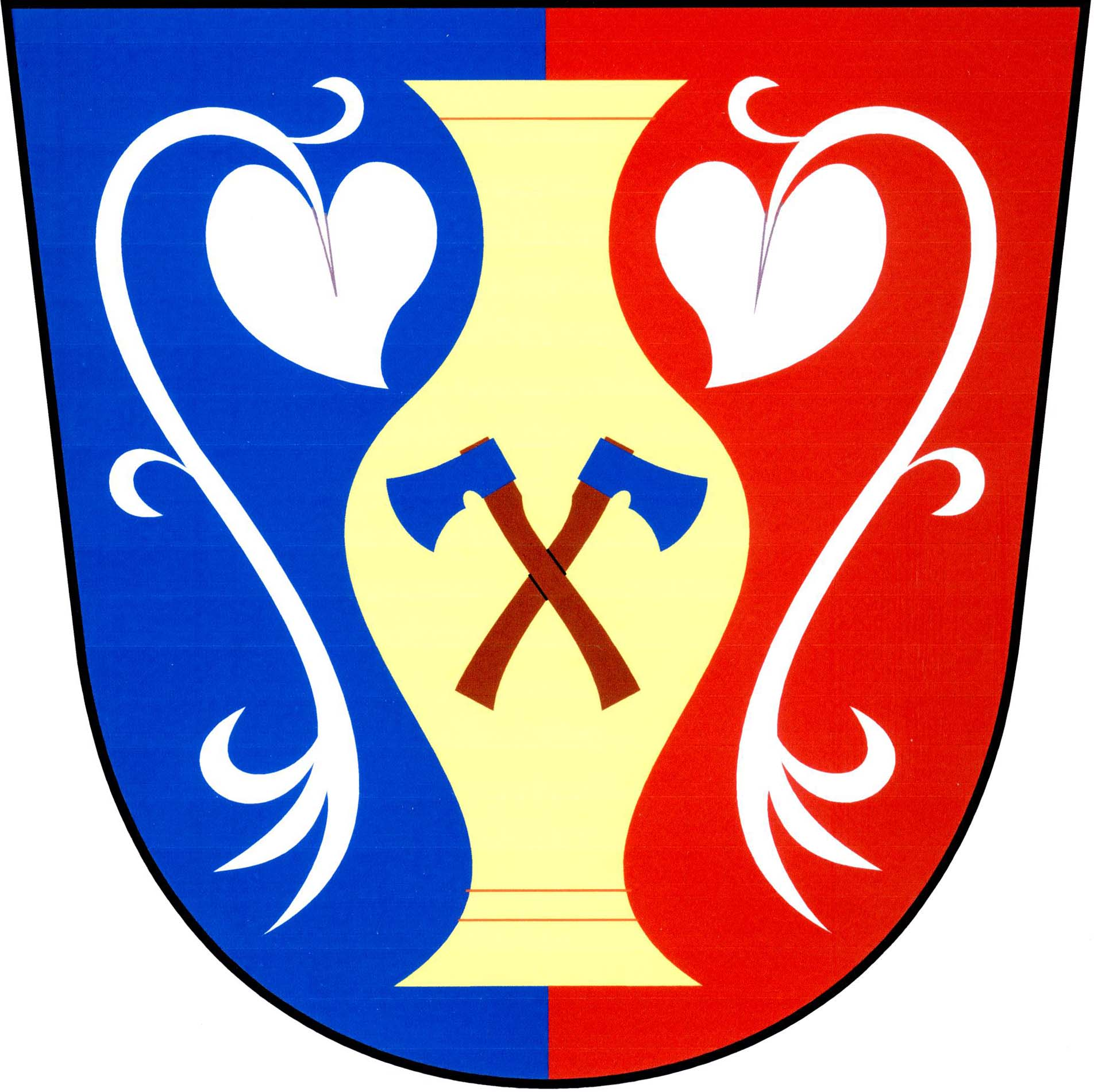
- Flag Coat of arms

- Location in the Czech Republic
- Coordinates: 49°7′17″N 16°58′43″E
- Country: Czech Republic
- Region: South Moravian
- District: Vyškov
- First mentioned: 1381

Area
  - Total: 11.52 km^{2} (4.45 sq mi)
- Elevation: 252 m (827 ft)

Population (2026-01-01)
  - Total: 507
  - Density: 44.0/km^{2} (114/sq mi)
- Time zone: UTC+1 (CET)
  - Summer (DST): UTC+2 (CEST)
- Postal code: 685 01
- Website: www.mourinov.cz

Mouřínov is a municipality and village in Vyškov District in the South Moravian Region of the Czech Republic. It has about 500 inhabitants.

Mouřínov lies approximately 18 kilometres (11 mi) south of Vyškov, 29 km (18 mi) east of Brno, and 215 km (134 mi) south-east of Prague.

== Demographics ==
Historical population
| Year | Pop. | ±% |
|---|---|---|
| 1869 | 630 | — |
| 1880 | 683 | +8.4% |
| 1890 | 698 | +2.2% |
| 1900 | 735 | +5.3% |
| 1910 | 820 | +11.6% |
| 1921 | 808 | −1.5% |
| 1930 | 794 | −1.7% |
| 1950 | 708 | −10.8% |
| 1961 | 727 | +2.7% |
| 1970 | 643 | −11.6% |
| 1980 | 523 | −18.7% |
| 1991 | 493 | −5.7% |
| 2001 | 467 | −5.3% |
| 2011 | 419 | −10.3% |
| 2021 | 462 | +10.3% |
Source: Censuses

== Notable people ==
- Antonín Pospíšil (1903–1973), politician
