= Havířov (administrative district) =

Administrative district in the Czech Republic

Administrative district of the municipality with extended powers of Havířov Správní obvod obce s rozšířenou působností Havířov
- Administrative district of municipality with extended powers
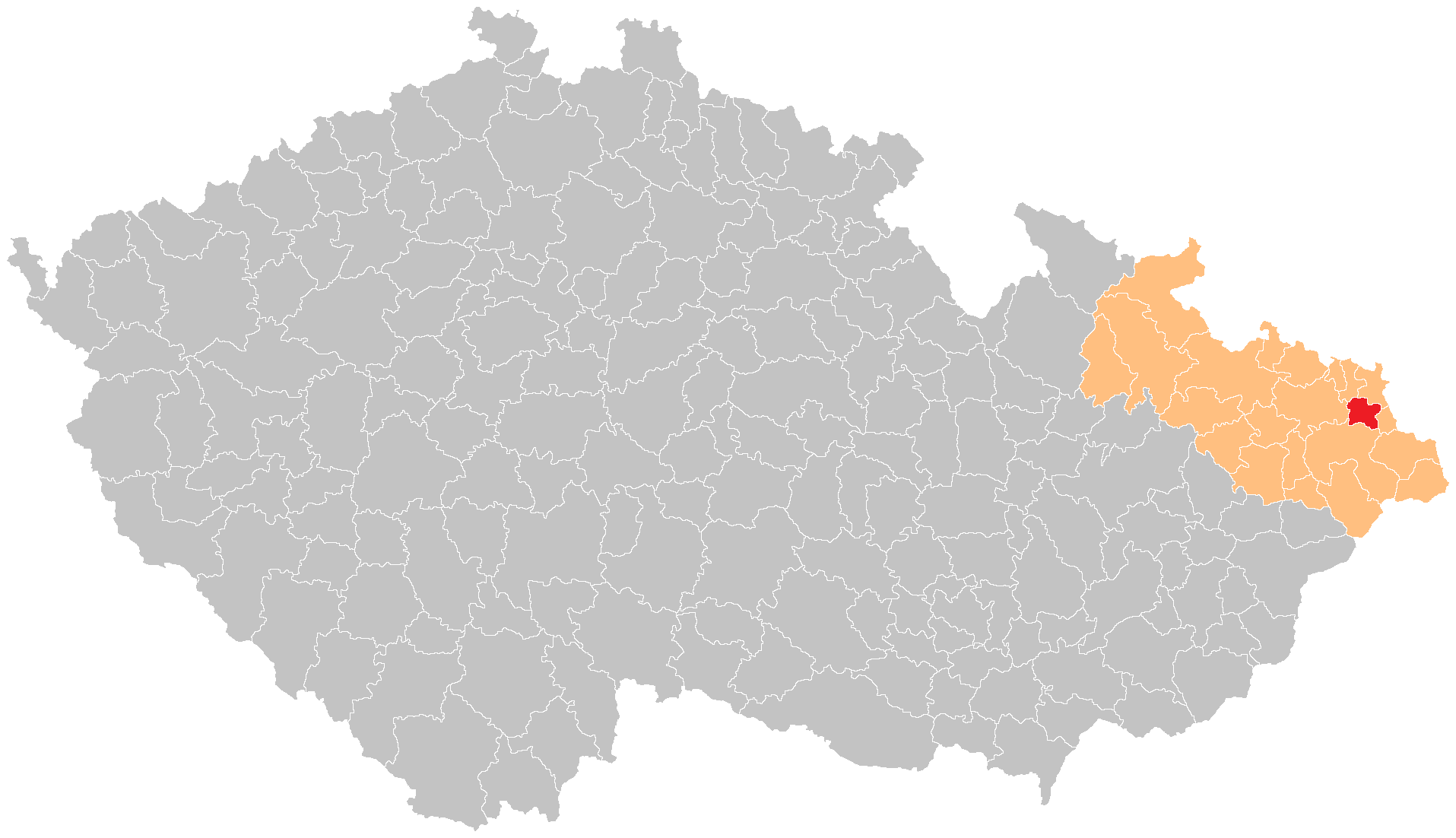
- Location in the Moravian-Silesian Region within the Czech Republic
- Coordinates: 49°46′N 18°29′E
- Country: Czech Republic
- Region: Moravian-Silesian
- District: Karviná
- Municipality with extended powers: Havířov

Area
  - Total: 88.19 km^{2} (34.05 sq mi)

Population (2024)
  - Total: 85,310
  - Density: 967.3/km^{2} (2,505/sq mi)
- Time zone: UTC+1 (CET)
  - Summer (DST): UTC+2 (CEST)
- Municipalities: 5
- * Cities and towns: 1
- * Market towns: 0

The administrative district of the municipality with extended powers of Havířov (abbreviated AD MEP Havířov; Czech: Správní obvod obce s rozšířenou působností Havířov, SO ORP Havířov) is an administrative district of municipality with extended powers in Karviná District in the Moravian-Silesian Region of the Czech Republic. It has existed since 1 January 2003, when the districts were replaced administratively. It includes 5 municipalities which have a combined population of about 85,000.

== Municipalities ==
Cities and towns are in bold.

Municipality	Population	Area (km^{2)}	Density
Albrechtice	3,818	12.69	300
**Havířov**	69,694	32.08	2,172
Horní Bludovice	2,591	8.98	288
Horní Suchá	4,366	9.80	445
Těrlicko	4,841	24.65	196

== Demographics ==
Historical population

Year	Pop.	±%
1869	11,570	—
1880	12,019	+3.9%
1890	12,545	+4.4%
1900	14,266	+13.7%
1910	18,650	+30.7%

Year	Pop.	±%
1921	20,973	+12.5%
1930	22,798	+8.7%
1950	23,488	+3.0%
1961	63,209	+169.1%
1970	94,073	+48.8%

Year	Pop.	±%
1980	98,778	+5.0%
1991	99,830	+1.1%
2001	99,986	+0.2%
2011	91,092	−8.9%
2021	83,249	−8.6%

Source: Censuses
