= Stratov =

- Municipality
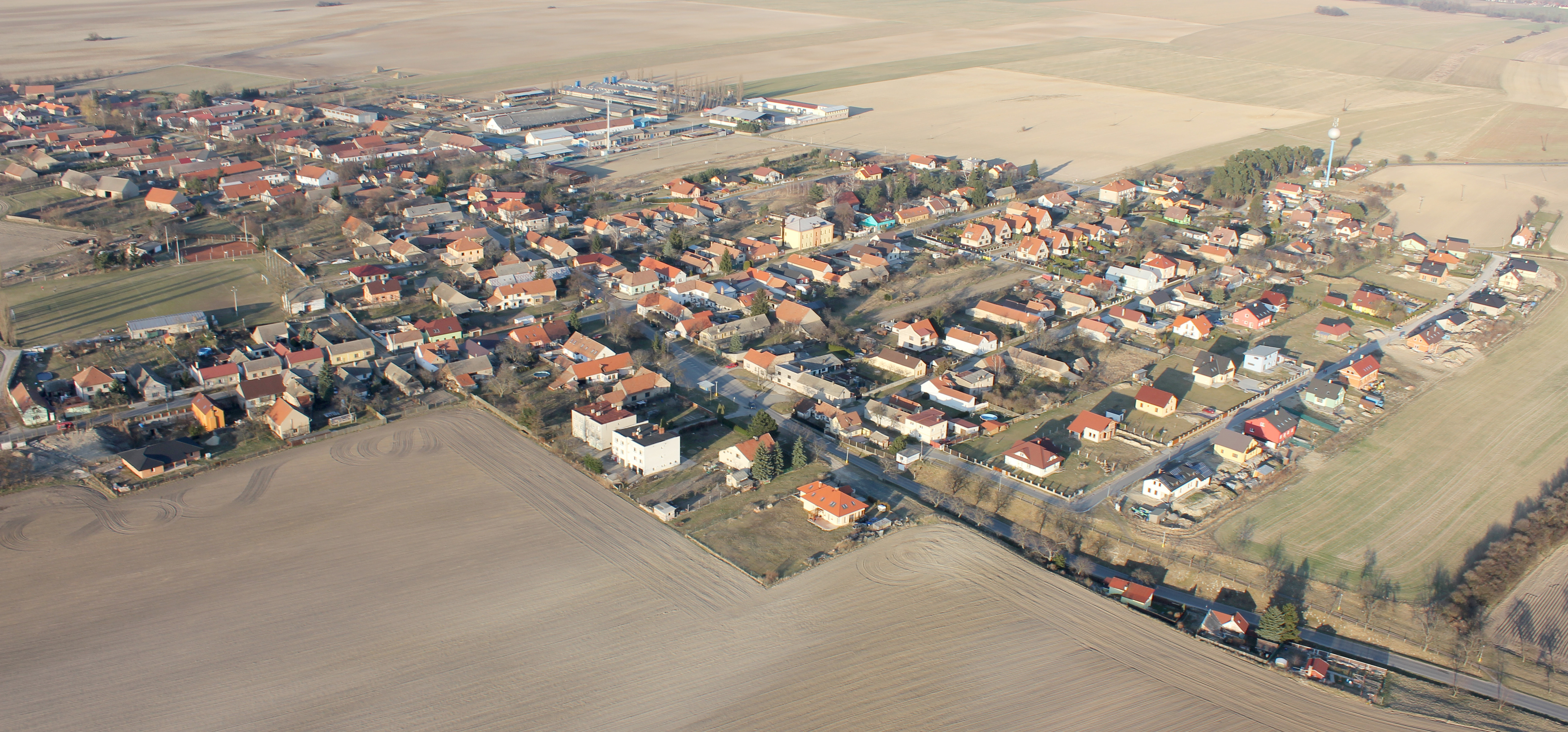
- Aerial view

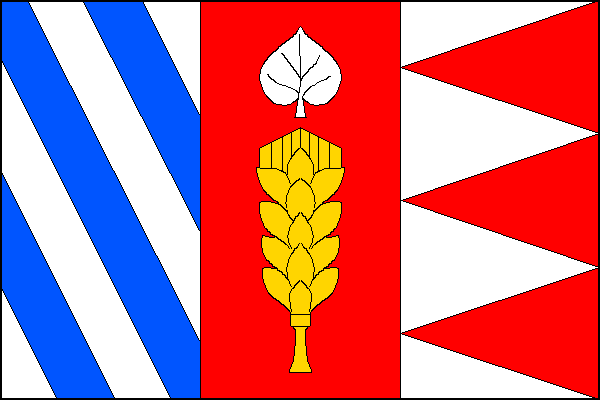
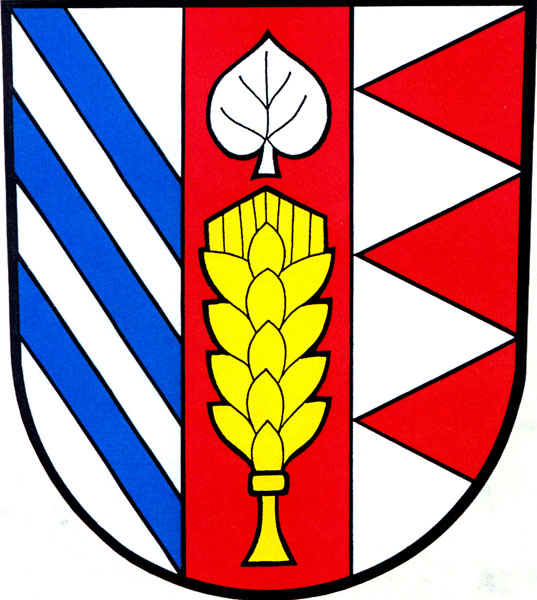
- Flag Coat of arms

- Location in the Czech Republic
- Coordinates: 50°11′35″N 14°54′36″E
- Country: Czech Republic
- Region: Central Bohemian
- District: Nymburk
- First mentioned: 1357

Area
  - Total: 6.30 km^{2} (2.43 sq mi)
- Elevation: 199 m (653 ft)

Population (2026-01-01)
  - Total: 762
  - Density: 121/km^{2} (313/sq mi)
- Time zone: UTC+1 (CET)
  - Summer (DST): UTC+2 (CEST)
- Postal code: 289 22
- Website: www.stratov.cz

Stratov is a municipality and village in Nymburk District in the Central Bohemian Region of the Czech Republic. It has about 800 inhabitants.

== Demographics ==
Historical population
Year	Pop.	±%
1869	498	—
1880	543	+9.0%
1890	611	+12.5%
1900	620	+1.5%
1910	625	+0.8%
1921	609	−2.6%
1930	666	+9.4%
1950	578	−13.2%
1961	533	−7.8%
1970	470	−11.8%
1980	447	−4.9%
1991	381	−14.8%
2001	410	+7.6%
2011	486	+18.5%
2021	640	+31.7%
Source: Censuses
