= Karviná (administrative district) =

Administrative district in the Czech Republic

Administrative district of the municipality with extended powers of Karviná Správní obvod obce s rozšířenou působností Karviná
- Administrative district of municipality with extended powers
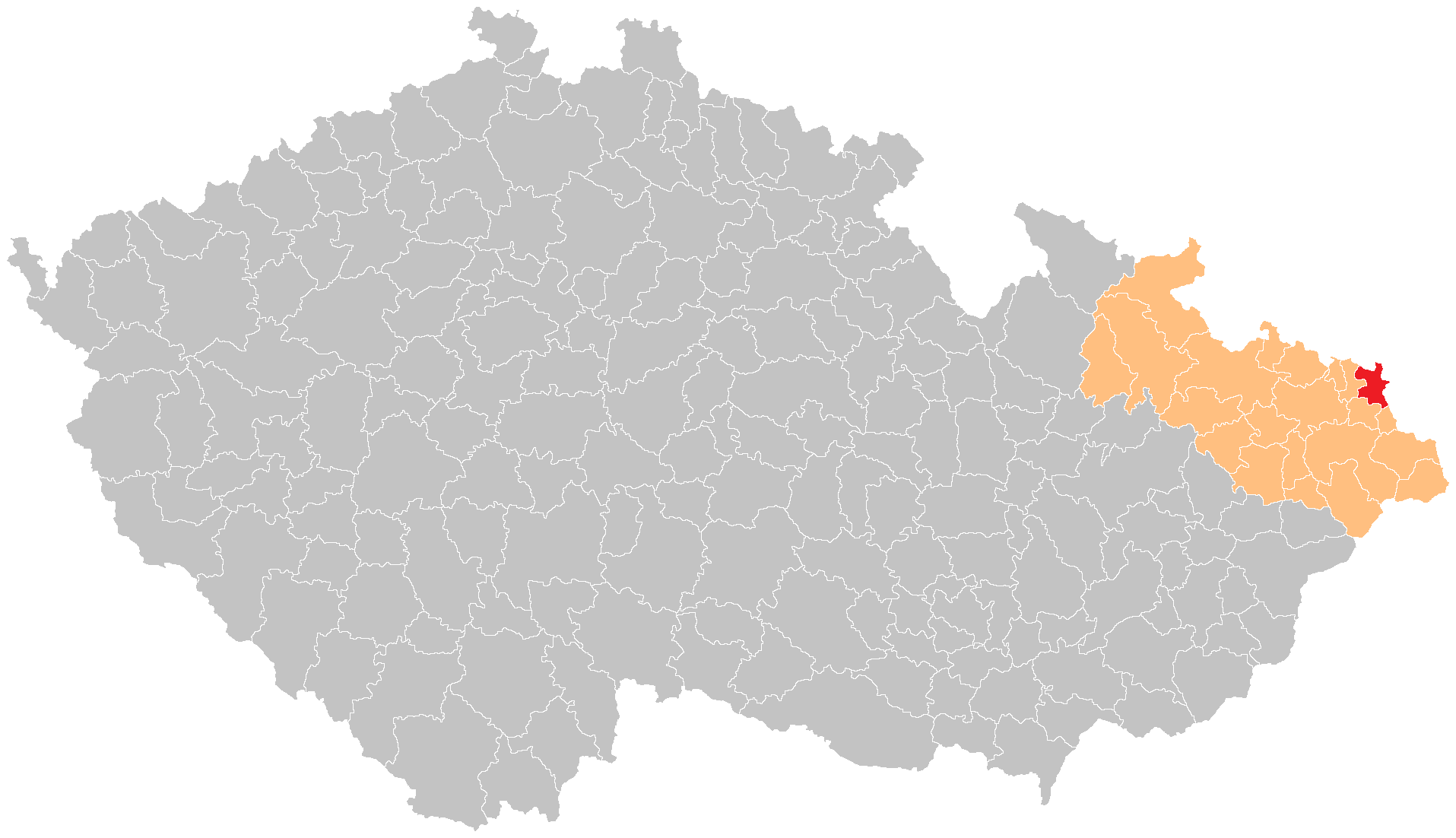
- Location in the Moravian-Silesian Region within the Czech Republic
- Coordinates: 49°51′N 18°32′E
- Country: Czech Republic
- Region: Moravian-Silesian
- District: Karviná
- Municipality with extended powers: Karviná

Area
  - Total: 105.62 km^{2} (40.78 sq mi)

Population (2024)
  - Total: 60,862
  - Density: 576.24/km^{2} (1,492.4/sq mi)
- Time zone: UTC+1 (CET)
  - Summer (DST): UTC+2 (CEST)
- Municipalities: 4
- * Cities and towns: 1
- * Market towns: 0

The administrative district of the municipality with extended powers of Karviná (abbreviated AD MEP Karviná; Czech: Správní obvod obce s rozšířenou působností Karviná, SO ORP Karviná) is an administrative district of municipality with extended powers in Karviná District in the Moravian-Silesian Region of the Czech Republic. It has existed since 1 January 2003, when the districts were replaced administratively. It includes 4 municipalities which have a combined population of about 61,000.

== Municipalities ==
Cities and towns are in bold.

Municipality	Population	Area (km^{2)}	Density
Dětmarovice	4,435	13.76	322
**Karviná**	49,724	57.52	864
Petrovice u Karviné	4,945	20.47	241
Stonava	1,758	13.87	126

== Demographics ==
Historical population

Year	Pop.	±%
1869	14,199	—
1880	18,420	+29.7%
1890	23,626	+28.3%
1900	33,263	+40.8%
1910	40,981	+23.2%

Year	Pop.	±%
1921	46,909	+14.5%
1930	51,032	+8.8%
1950	50,392	−1.3%
1961	61,887	+22.8%
1970	90,471	+46.2%

Year	Pop.	±%
1980	88,498	−2.2%
1991	77,737	−12.2%
2001	75,250	−3.2%
2011	68,024	−9.6%
2021	59,144	−13.1%

Source: Censuses
