= Rašovice (Vyškov District) =

- Municipality
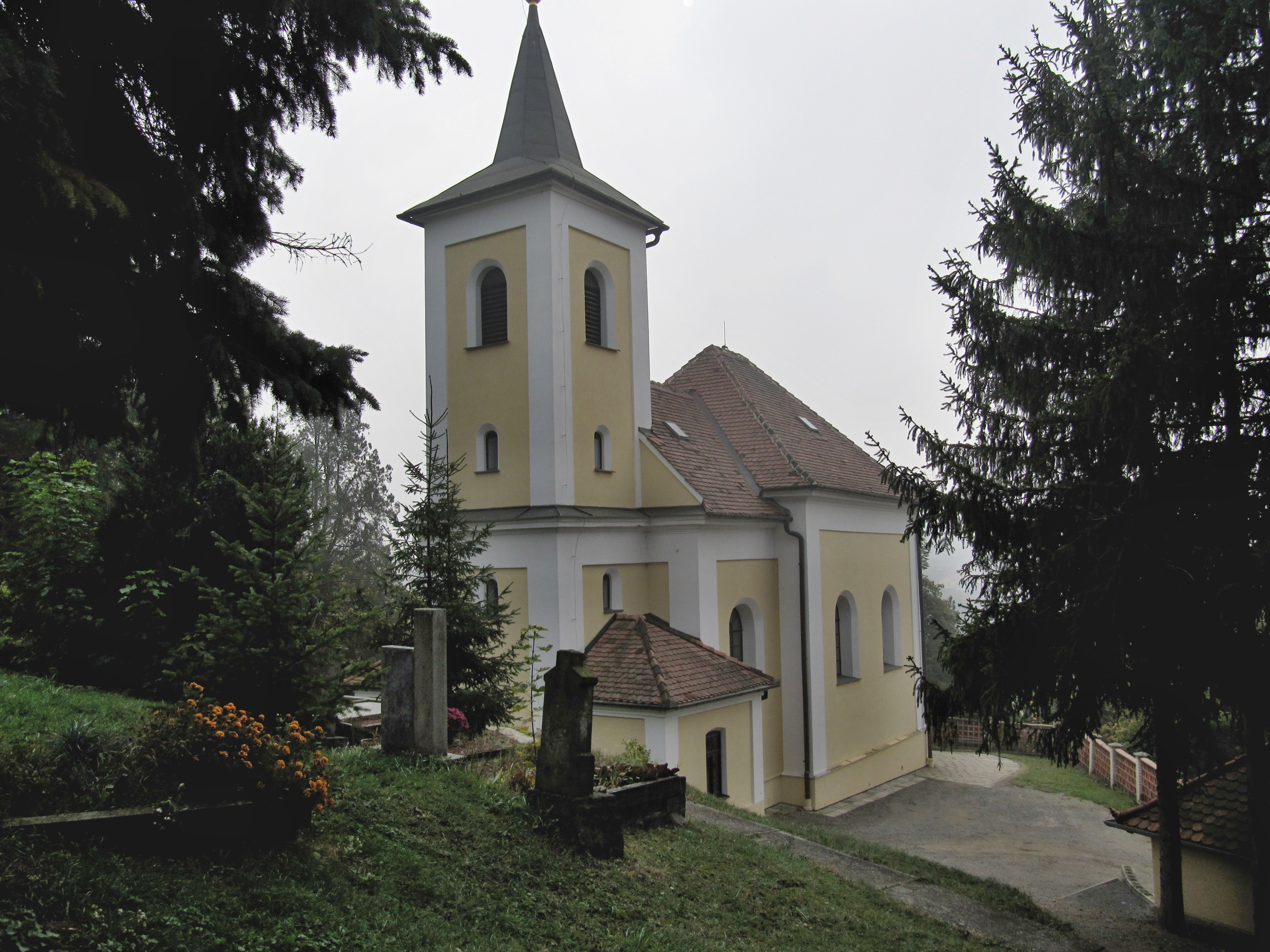
- Chapel of Saints Cyril and Methodius

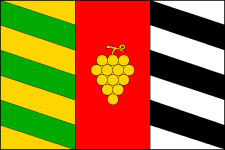
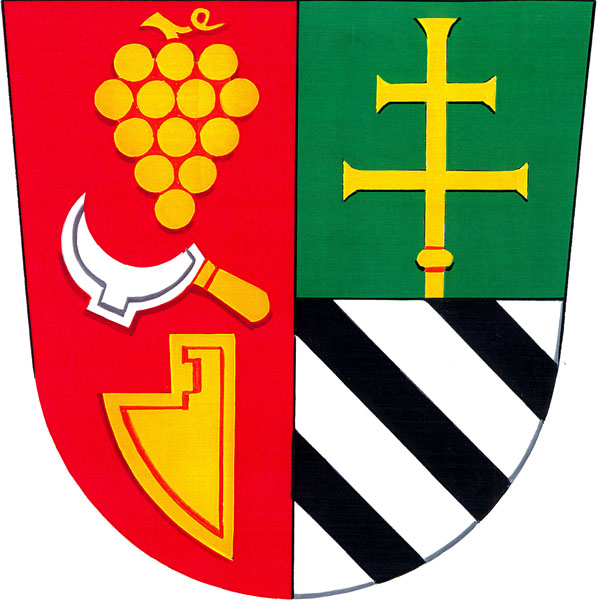
- Flag Coat of arms

- Location in the Czech Republic
- Coordinates: 49°7′16″N 16°56′54″E
- Country: Czech Republic
- Region: South Moravian
- District: Vyškov
- First mentioned: 1141

Area
  - Total: 5.66 km^{2} (2.19 sq mi)
- Elevation: 245 m (804 ft)

Population (2026-01-01)
  - Total: 717
  - Density: 127/km^{2} (328/sq mi)
- Time zone: UTC+1 (CET)
  - Summer (DST): UTC+2 (CEST)
- Postal code: 685 01
- Website: www.obecrasovice.cz

Rašovice is a municipality and village in Vyškov District in the South Moravian Region of the Czech Republic. It has about 700 inhabitants.

Rašovice lies approximately 17 kilometres (11 mi) south of Vyškov, 26 km (16 mi) east of Brno, and 212 km (132 mi) south-east of Prague.

== Demographics ==
Historical population
| Year | Pop. | ±% |
|---|---|---|
| 1869 | 674 | — |
| 1880 | 731 | +8.5% |
| 1890 | 766 | +4.8% |
| 1900 | 763 | −0.4% |
| 1910 | 892 | +16.9% |
| 1921 | 896 | +0.4% |
| 1930 | 903 | +0.8% |
| 1950 | 865 | −4.2% |
| 1961 | 891 | +3.0% |
| 1970 | 812 | −8.9% |
| 1980 | 768 | −5.4% |
| 1991 | 668 | −13.0% |
| 2001 | 667 | −0.1% |
| 2011 | 629 | −5.7% |
| 2021 | 679 | +7.9% |
Source: Censuses
