= Vyškov (administrative district) =

Administrative district in the South Moravian Region, Czech Republic

Administrative district of the municipality with extended powers of Vyškov Správní obvod obce s rozšířenou působností Vyškov
- Administrative district of municipality with extended powers
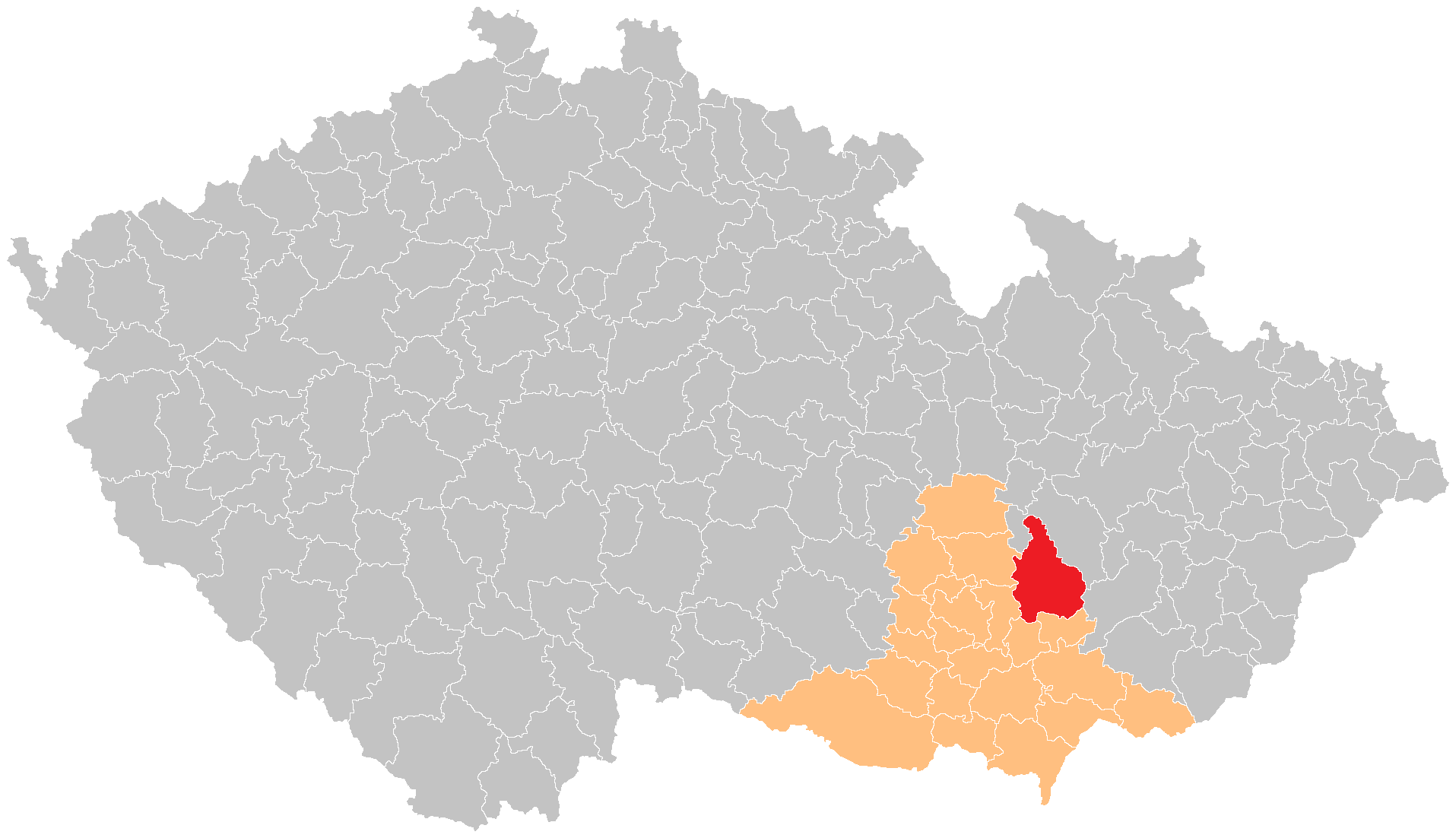
- Location in the South Moravian Region within the Czech Republic
- Coordinates: 49°18′N 16°58′E
- Country: Czech Republic
- Region: South Moravian
- District: Vyškov
- Municipality with extended powers: Vyškov

Area
  - Total: 540.07 km^{2} (208.52 sq mi)

Population (2024)
  - Total: 53,179
  - Density: 98.467/km^{2} (255.03/sq mi)
- Time zone: UTC+1 (CET)
  - Summer (DST): UTC+2 (CEST)
- Municipalities: 41
- * Cities and towns: 3
- * Market towns: 2

The administrative district of the municipality with extended powers of Vyškov (abbreviated AD MEP Vyškov; Czech: Správní obvod obce s rozšířenou působností Vyškov, SO ORP Vyškov) is an administrative district of municipality with extended powers in Vyškov District in the South Moravian Region of the Czech Republic. It has existed since 1 January 2003, when the districts were replaced administratively. It includes 41 municipalities along with the Březina military training area, which have a combined population of about 53,000.

== Municipalities ==
Cities and towns are in bold, and market towns are in italics.

Municipality	Population	Area (km^{2)}	Density
Bohdalice-Pavlovice	956	8.89	107
Březina	0	149.62	0
Dětkovice	272	4.97	55
Drnovice	2,368	11.97	197
Drysice	614	7.89	78
Habrovany	920	5.51	167
Hlubočany	542	8.06	67
Hoštice-Heroltice	627	7.24	87
Hvězdlice	582	11.40	51
**Ivanovice na Hané**	2,977	21.43	138
Ježkovice	381	11.68	33
Komořany	756	5.85	129
Kozlany	399	7.61	52
Krásensko	419	7.26	58
Křižanovice u Vyškova	145	2.47	59
Kučerov	498	8.70	57
Luleč	989	10.88	91
Lysovice	296	5.30	56
Medlovice	416	3.61	115
Moravské Málkovice	591	3.65	161
Nemojany	830	6.01	138
Nové Sady	100	2.44	41
Olšany	647	18.68	35
Orlovice	294	14.47	20
Podbřežice	267	3.54	75
Podivice	165	3.58	46
Podomí	461	5.46	84
Prusy-Boškůvky	675	7.73	87
Pustiměř	1,945	12.50	155
Račice-Pístovice	1,314	18.86	70
Radslavice	448	4.35	103
Rostěnice-Zvonovice	610	7.52	81
**Rousínov**	5,962	23.05	258
Ruprechtov	631	11.48	55
Rybníček	260	2.10	123
Studnice	510	6.36	80
Švábenice	1,039	19.38	54
Topolany	378	4.44	85
Tučapy	624	5.29	118
Vážany	446	5.44	82
**Vyškov**	20,498	50.46	406
Zelená Hora	327	2.96	110

== Demographics ==
Historical population

Year	Pop.	±%
1869	40,996	—
1880	43,561	+6.3%
1890	45,456	+4.4%
1900	47,559	+4.6%
1910	51,016	+7.3%

Year	Pop.	±%
1921	50,266	−1.5%
1930	50,643	+0.8%
1950	46,325	−8.5%
1961	48,040	+3.7%
1970	47,142	−1.9%

Year	Pop.	±%
1980	49,724	+5.5%
1991	50,794	+2.2%
2001	50,579	−0.4%
2011	50,821	+0.5%
2021	51,483	+1.3%

Source: Censuses
