= Černý =

Černý (Czech pronunciation: [ˈtʃɛrniː]; feminine: Černá) is a Czech language surname, which means 'black'.

Cognate surnames in other Slavic-speaking countries include Čierny in Slovak, Czarny in Polish and Chyorny (Чёрный) in Russian. There also exist anglicised, germanised and polonised forms (Cherny, Tscherny, or Czerny, respectively). Related surnames include Černík, Chernenko and Chernov.

Notable people with the surname include:

== Sports ==
- Dominik Černý (born 1997), Slovak racewalker
- Franny Černá (born 1997), Czech footballer
- Hana Černá (born 1974), Czech swimmer
- Harald Cerny (born 1973), Austrian footballer
- Jakub Černý (born 1987), Czech ice hockey player
- Josef Černý (1939–2025), Czech ice hockey player and coach
- Josef Černý (cyclist) (born 1993), Czech cyclist
- Kamil Černý (born 1985), Czech ice hockey player
- Klára Černá (born 1985), Czech handball player
- Lenka Černá (born 1966), Czech handball player
- Logan Cerny (born 1999), American baseball player
- Milan Černý (born 1988), Czech footballer
- Miroslava Černá (born 1972), Czech paralympic archer
- Pavel Černý (footballer, born 1962), Czech footballer
- Pavel Černý (footballer, born 1985), Czech footballer
- Radek Černý (born 1974), Czech footballer
- Teodor Černý (born 1957), Czech cyclist
- Tomáš Černý (born 1985), Czech footballer
- Václav Černý (footballer) (born 1997), Czech footballer
- Věra Černá (born 1963), Czech gymnast
- Věra Černá (athlete) (1938–2008), Czech athlete
- Vlastimil Černý (born 1963), Canadian swimmer
- Zuzana Černá (born 1983), Czech tennis player

== Other ==
- Adolf Černý (1864–1952), Czech writer
- Albert Černý (born 1989), Czech singer and guitarist
- Amanda Cerny (born 1991), American internet personality, actress and model
- Andrea Černá (born 1977), Czech actress
- Berthe Cerny (1868–1940), French actress
- David Černý (born 1967), Czech sculptor
- Emma Černá (1937–2018), Czech actress
- Ervín Černý (1913–2001), Czech medical doctor and archaeologist
- Jan Černý (1874–1959), Czech politician
- Jan Černý-Nigranus (1500–1565), Czech historian
- Jana Černá (1928–1981), Czech dissident
- Jaroslav Černý (Egyptologist) (1898–1970), Czech Egyptologist
- Josef Černý (painter) (born 1943), Czech painter
- Karel Černý (art director) (1922–2014), Czech art director
- Ladislav Černý (1891–1975), Czech musician
- Mark Cerny (born 1964), American programmer
- Miroslava Černá (born 1972), Czech archer
- Otakar Černý (1943–2021), Czech journalist
- Petr Černý (1934–2018), Canadian mineralogist
- Václav Černý (writer) (1905–1987), Czech writer
- Věnceslav Černý (1865–1936), Czech artist
