= Chernov =

Chernov (Russian: Чернов) is a Slavic surname formed from the Russian word Chyorny (Russian: Чёрный) meaning black. The feminine form of the surname is Chernova (or Tchernova). Notable people with the surname include:

- Alex Chernov (born 1938), Australian judge, Chancellor of the University of Melbourne, and Governor of Victoria
- Aleksandr A. Chernov (1877–1963), Soviet geologist, paleontologist, and Hero of Socialist Labor
- Andrei Chernov (1966–2017), Russian programmer, one of the founders of Runet and the creator of the KOI8-R character encoding
- Artyom Chernov (1982–2020), Russian professional ice hockey centre
- Dmitry Chernov (1839–1921), Russian metallurgist
- Evgeniy Demitrievich Chernov, Soviet admiral, former commander of Soviet submarine K-278 Komsomolets
- Georgy Chernov (1906–2009), Russian geologist and Order "For Merit to the Fatherland"
- Lada Chernova (born 1970), Russian javelin thrower
- Mikhail Chernov (ice hockey) (born 1978), Russian ice hockey player
- Mikhail Chernov (politician) (1891–1938), Russian politician
- Mstyslav Chernov (born 1985), Ukrainian journalist and photographer
- Natalia Chernova (born 1976), Russian gymnast
- Nikolai Chernov (1956–2014), Ukrainian-American mathematician
- Tatyana Chernova (born 1988), Russian heptathlete
- Victoria Chernova, Russian Paralympic athlete
- Viktor Chernov (1873–1952), the founder of Socialist-Revolutionary Party
- Vladimir Chernov (born 1953), Russian baritone singer
- Vladimir Chernov (footballer) (born 1991), Russian footballer

== See also ==
- 4207 Chernova, main-belt asteroid
