= Habrovany (Vyškov District) =

- Municipality
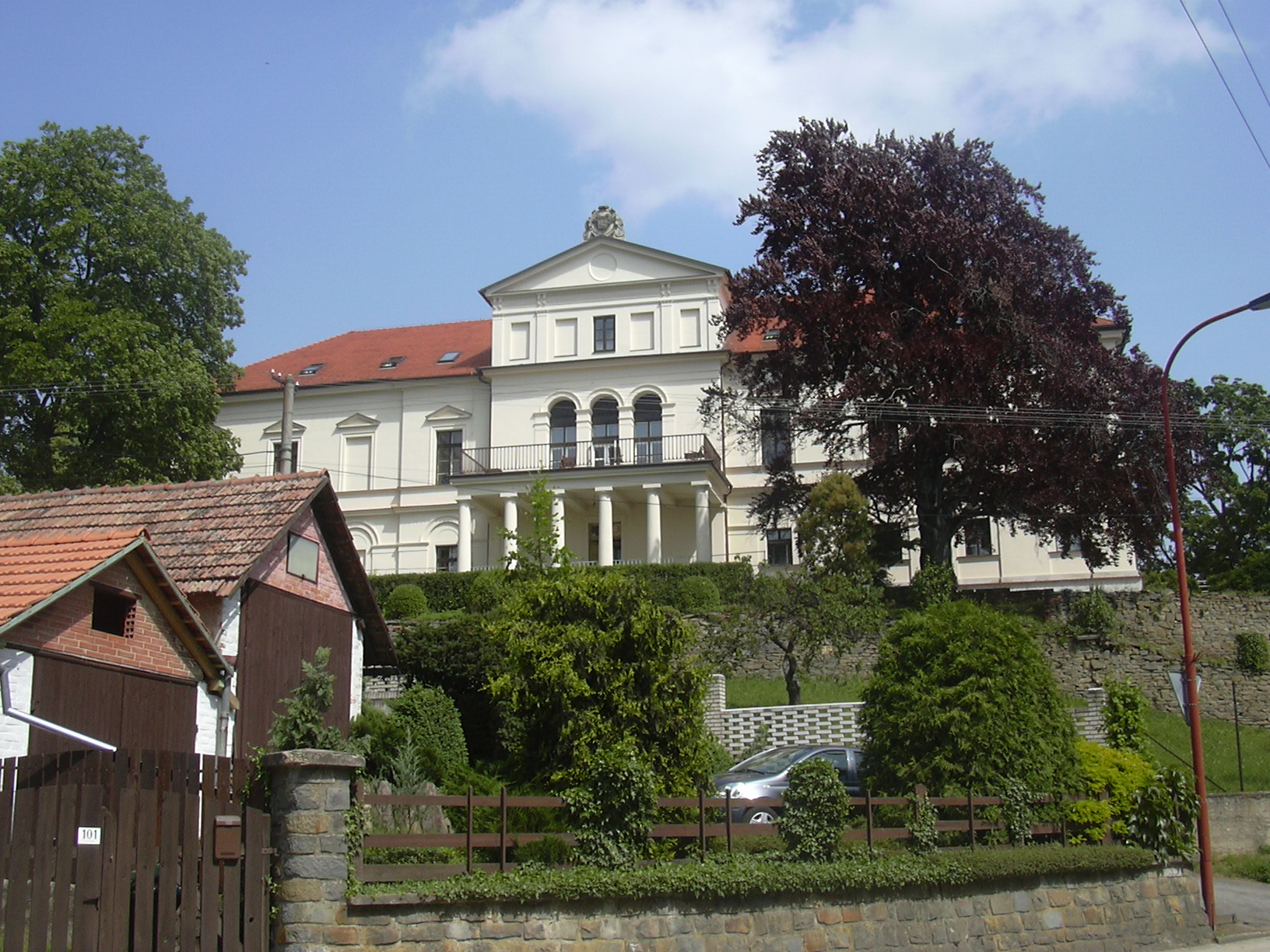
- Habrovany Castle

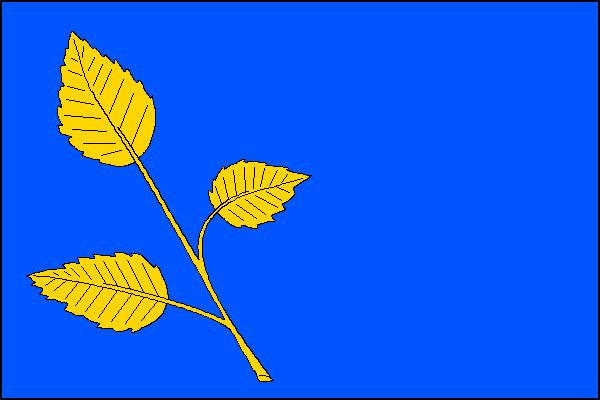
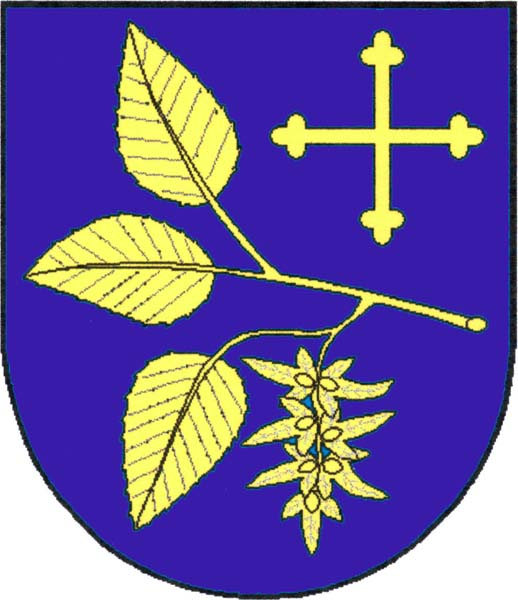
- Flag Coat of arms

- Location in the Czech Republic
- Coordinates: 49°13′58″N 16°52′42″E
- Country: Czech Republic
- Region: South Moravian
- District: Vyškov
- First mentioned: 1350

Area
  - Total: 5.51 km^{2} (2.13 sq mi)
- Elevation: 314 m (1,030 ft)

Population (2026-01-01)
  - Total: 933
  - Density: 169/km^{2} (439/sq mi)
- Time zone: UTC+1 (CET)
  - Summer (DST): UTC+2 (CEST)
- Postal code: 683 01
- Website: www.habrovany.cz

Habrovany is a municipality and village in Vyškov District in the South Moravian Region of the Czech Republic. It has about 900 inhabitants.

== Geography ==
Habrovany is located about 9 kilometres (6 mi) southwest of Vyškov and 17 km (11 mi) east of Brno. It lies on the border between the Vyškov Gate and Drahany Highlands. The stream Habrovanský potok flows through the municipality.

== History ==
The first written mention of Habrovany is from 1350. During its feudal history, the owners of the village changed frequently and included various less important nobles and knights. Notable owners of Habrovany were the Dubčanský of Zdenín family. During their rule in 1512–1539, the castle and the church were built and there was a religious sect here.

From 1960 to 1990, Habrovany was merged with neighbouring Olšany and formed one municipality called Habrovany-Olšany.

== Demographics ==
Historical population

Year	Pop.	±%
1869	789	—
1880	839	+6.3%
1890	832	−0.8%
1900	936	+12.5%
1910	1,015	+8.4%

Year	Pop.	±%
1921	958	−5.6%
1930	988	+3.1%
1950	840	−15.0%
1961	939	+11.8%
1970	818	−12.9%

Year	Pop.	±%
1980	783	−4.3%
1991	727	−7.2%
2001	743	+2.2%
2011	829	+11.6%
2021	932	+12.4%

Source: Censuses

== Transport ==
There are no railways or major roads passing through the municipality.

== Sights ==
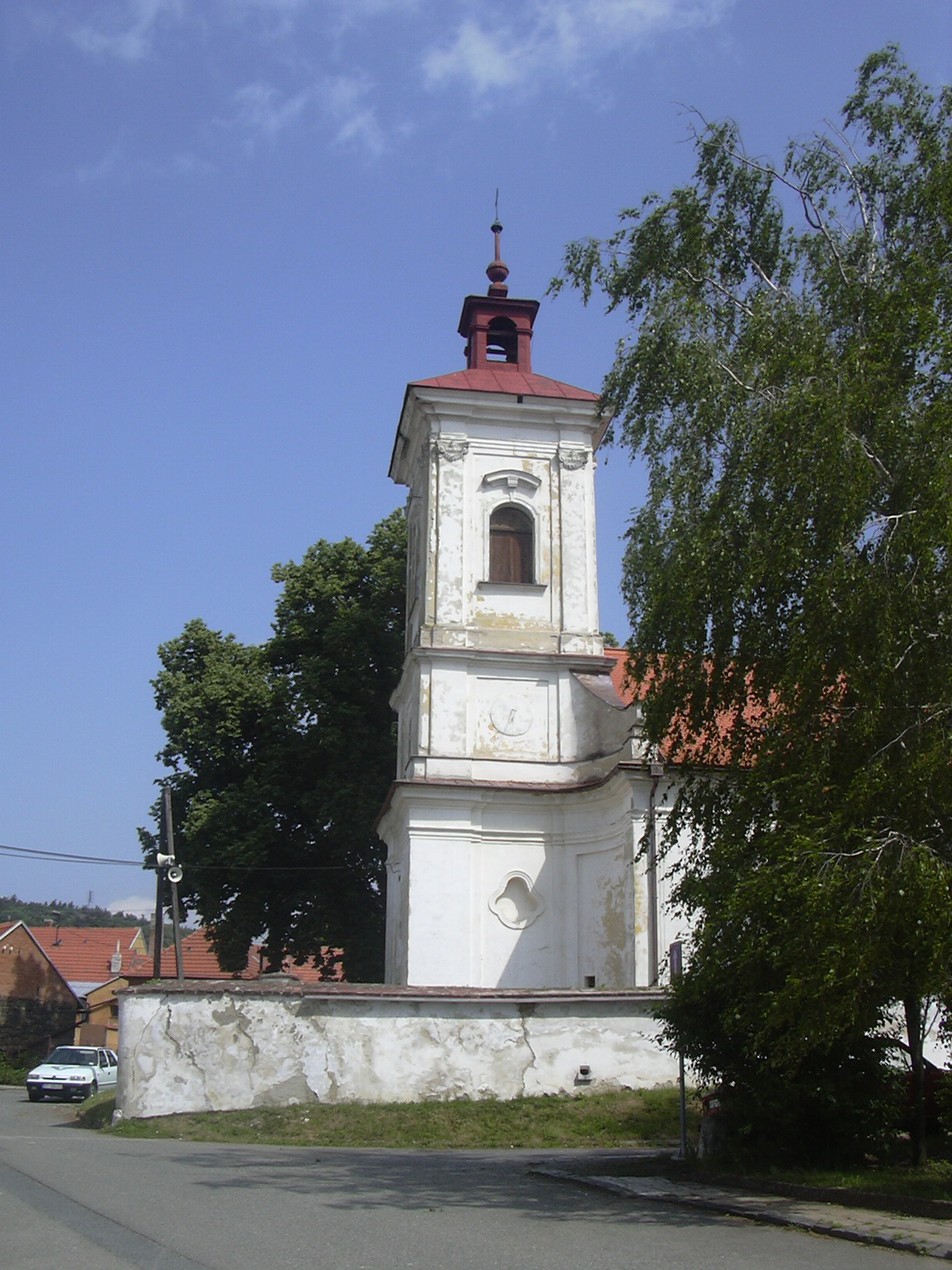
Church of the Holy Trinity

The main landmarks of Habrovany are the church and the castle. The Church of the Holy Trinity was built in the Baroque style in 1730, but it has a core from an older church from 1523. The tower was added in 1749.

The Habrovany Castle was originally a medieval fortress, rebuilt by Jan Dubčanský of Zdenín into a Renaissance castle. In 1825-1836, the Frankensdorf family rebuilt the castle in the Neoclassical style. Next to the castle is an English-style park. Today the castle serves as an institute for the physically disabled.
