= Kunvald =

- Market town
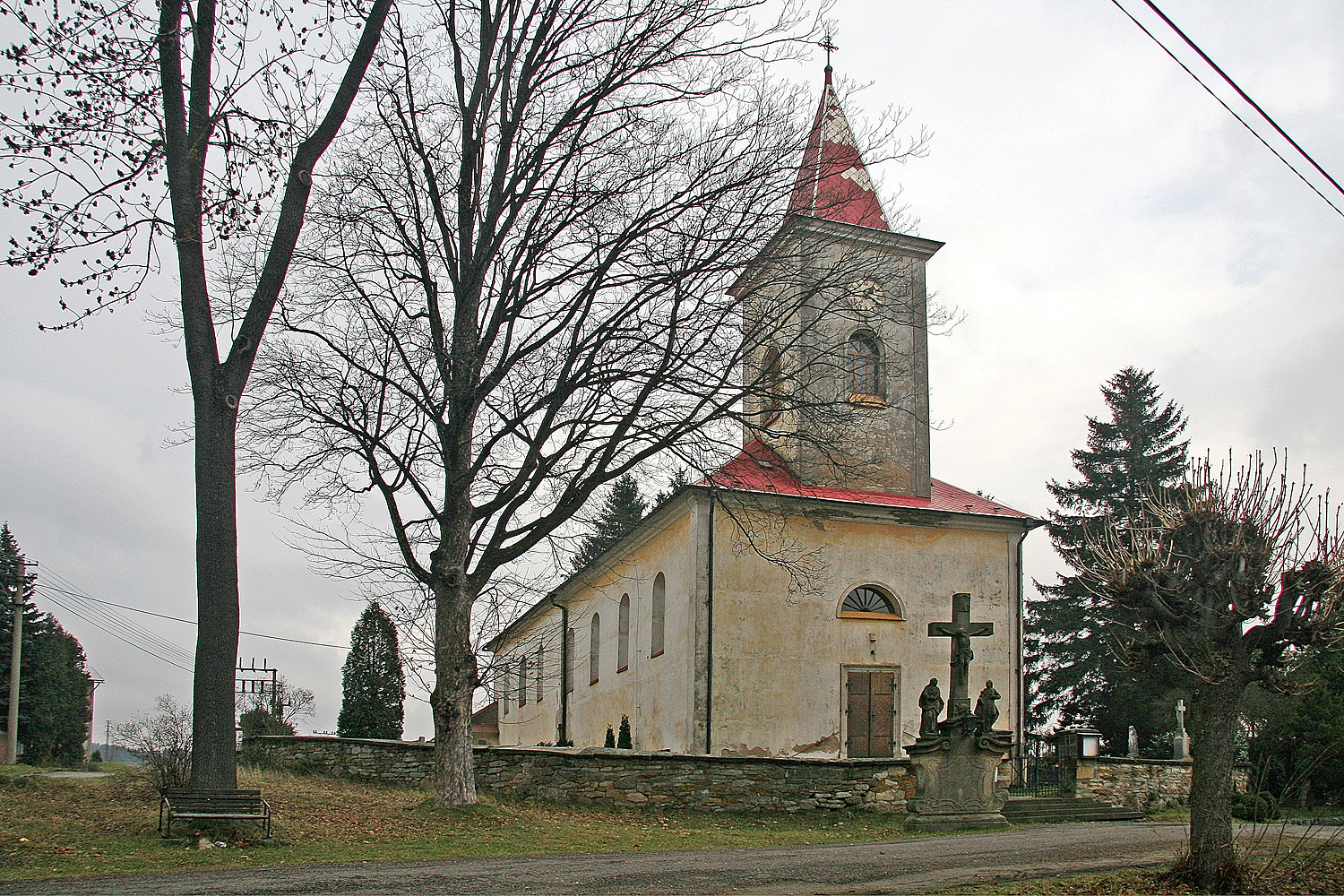
- Church of Saint George

- Flag Coat of arms

- Location in the Czech Republic
- Coordinates: 50°7′45″N 16°30′0″E
- Country: Czech Republic
- Region: Pardubice
- District: Ústí nad Orlicí
- First mentioned: 1363

Area
  - Total: 29.33 km^{2} (11.32 sq mi)
- Elevation: 450 m (1,480 ft)

Population (2026-01-01)
  - Total: 929
  - Density: 31.7/km^{2} (82.0/sq mi)
- Time zone: UTC+1 (CET)
  - Summer (DST): UTC+2 (CEST)
- Postal code: 561 81
- Website: www.kunvald.info

Kunvald (Czech pronunciation: [ˈkunvalt]; German: Kunewalde, Kunwald) is a market town in Ústí nad Orlicí District in the Pardubice Region of the Czech Republic. It has about 900 inhabitants. It is known as the place where the Moravian Church was founded.

== Administrative division ==
Kunvald consists of six municipal parts (in brackets population according to the 2021 census):

- Kunvald (789)
- Bubnov (8)
- Končiny (70)
- Kunačice (14)
- Záhory (3)
- Zaječiny (6)

== Etymology ==
The German name Kunwald means "Kun's forest". The Czech name is a transcription of the German name.

== Geography ==
Kunvald is located about 18 kilometres (11 mi) northeast of Ústí nad Orlicí and 52 km (32 mi) east of Pardubice. It lies in the Orlické Foothills. The highest point of the municipal territory is the Homole hill at 653 m (2,142 ft) above sea level. The stream Horský potok flows through the market town.

== History ==
The first written mention of Kunvald is from 1363. It was founded in the second half of the 13th century.

The Moravian Church was founded in Kunvald in "Na Sboru" House in 1457, when followers of the reformator Gregory the Patriarch found refuge on the estate of King George of Poděbrady.

== Demographics ==
Historical population

Year	Pop.	±%
1869	2,308	—
1880	2,327	+0.8%
1890	2,319	−0.3%
1900	2,091	−9.8%
1910	2,009	−3.9%

Year	Pop.	±%
1921	1,849	−8.0%
1930	1,744	−5.7%
1950	1,215	−30.3%
1961	1,188	−2.2%
1970	1,094	−7.9%

Year	Pop.	±%
1980	1,013	−7.4%
1991	1,027	+1.4%
2001	1,015	−1.2%
2011	967	−4.7%
2021	890	−8.0%

Source: Censuses

== Transport ==
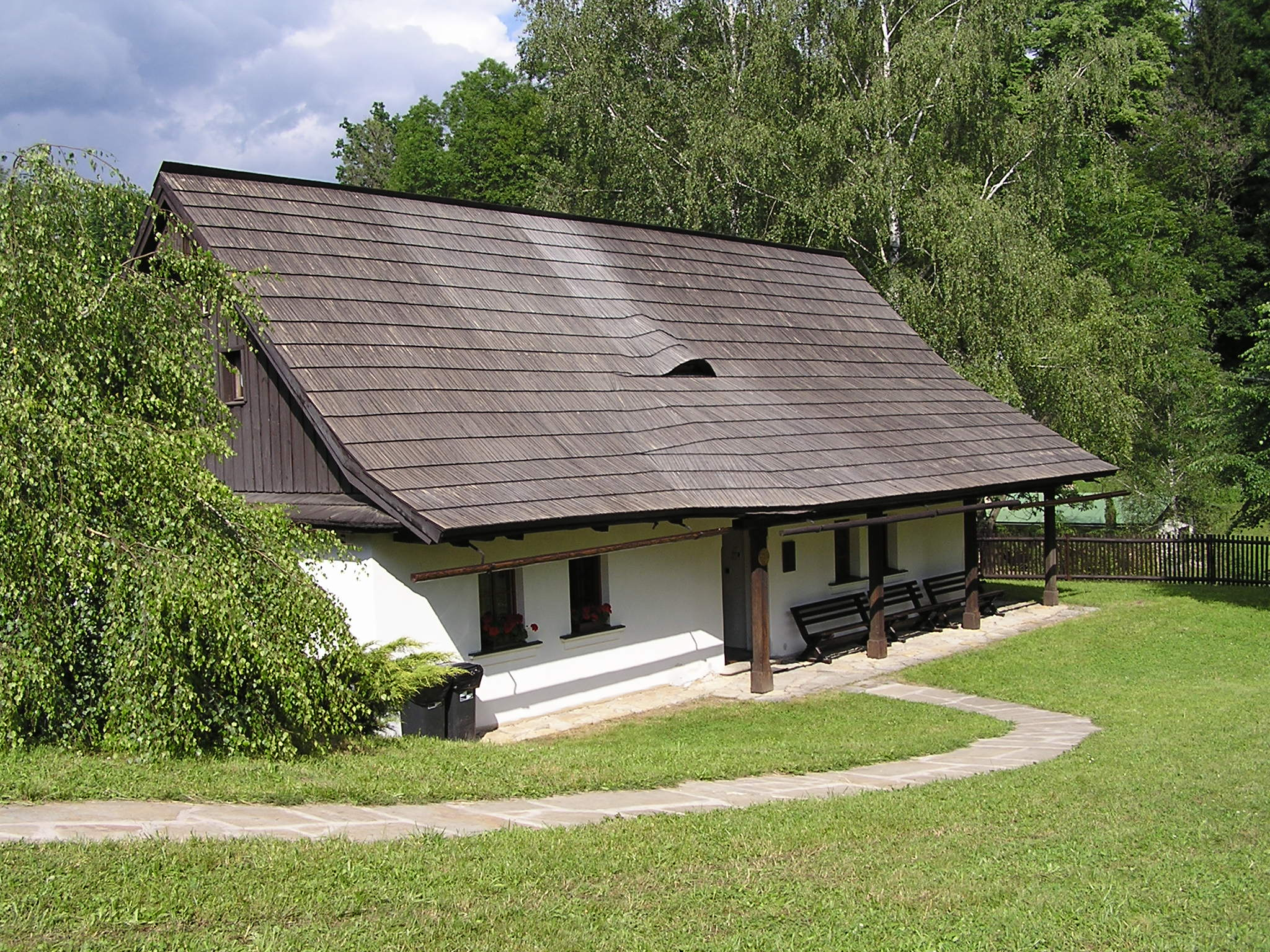
"Na Sboru" House

There are no railways or major roads passing through the municipality.

== Sights ==
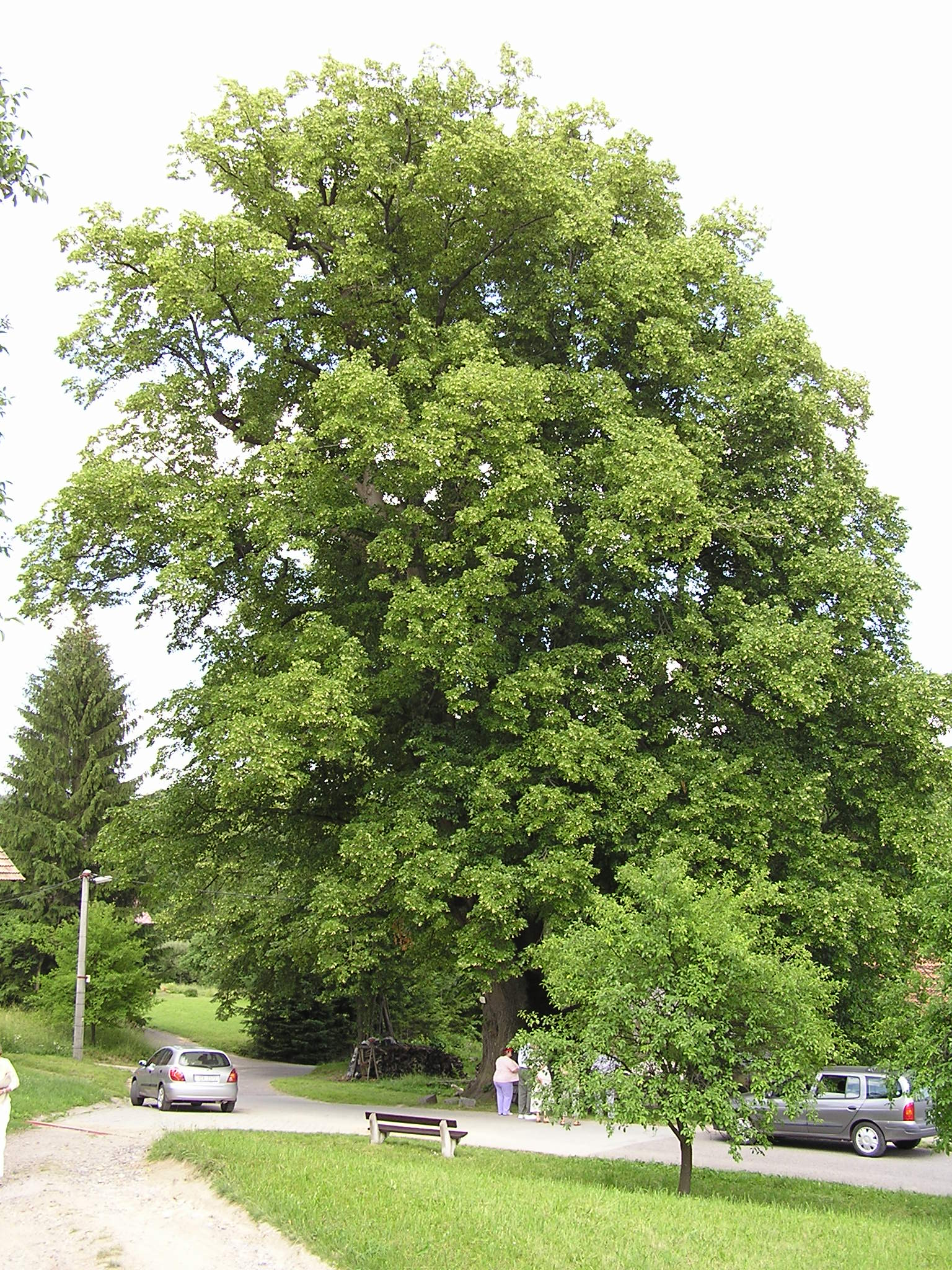
Brethren Linden

"Na Sboru" House is open to the public and contains an exposition on the history of the Moravian Church (Unity of the Brethren). Other memorable places, reminiscent of the work of the Moravian Church, are the Brethren Linden, which was planted here by members before leaving their homeland; a place called Jordán, where there used to be a well where the new members were baptized; a praying mine where the brothers hid and gathered for worship in times of oppression; a monument to John Amos Comenius from 1910, which stands in the original burial ground; and a smithy, from which the first bishop of the Unity allegedly came.

== Notable people ==
- Jan Černý-Nigranus (c. 1500–1565), historian and priest
- Matthias of Kunwald (died 1500), priest

== Twin towns – sister cities ==
Kunvald is twinned with:

- Lititz, United States
