= Ervín Černý =

- Born: 11 November 1913; Podomí, Moravia, Austria-Hungary
- Died: 30 July 2001 (aged 87); Prague, Czech Republic
- Other name: Ervín Černý-Křetínský

Ervín Černý-Křetínský (11 November 1913 – 30 July 2001) was a Czech medical doctor, archaeologist and educator. He was a professor at the Charles University.

== Biography ==
Černý was born on 11 November 1913 in Podomí, Moravia, Austria-Hungary. He acquired his college education in 1933 in the Cieszyn Silesia Region where he had lived since age 12. He studied medicine in Brno. Having been arrested by the Gestapo in November 1939, he was briefly imprisoned at Brno's Špilberk Castle and subsequently deported to the Sachsenhausen-Oranienburg Nazi concentration camp. As a doctor he was active at the ear, nose and throat (otolaryngology) clinics in Brno, Hradec Králové, and the Central Military Hospital in Prague. He was named associate professor (1951) and full professor (1965) of Charles University in Prague.

Ervín Černý lived in Prague but visited Podomí several times every year. He died on 30 July 2001, after a traffic accident.

== Medicine ==
Ervín Černý devoted himself mainly to the surgical treatment of ear, nose and throat health conditions. He delivered hundreds of lectures in and outside his homeland, and published 194 scientific papers, including an Atlas of Ear Surgery and Atlas of Throat Surgery, with his own illustrations. He was the honorary member of many Czechoslovak and international scientific organizations and his many international awards included the Czech Medical Society's Jan Evangelista Purkyně Prize, on the occasion of his 85th birthday.

== Historical geography ==
Ervín Černý was also a prominent scientist in the field of historical geography. Over 40 years of scientific endeavour in this field he explored a territory of over 600 square kilometres (230 sq mi) of his native Drahany Highlands to discover 62 decayed medieval settlements including their forest areas. He published more than 70 scientific papers in this field, and six of them were released in book form. He dedicated his book of epical poems, Zelený barvínek ('Green periwinkle'), to his native region.

He spent many years painstakingly collecting information about the history of his native village. In 1999 he presented Podomí with his detailed Chronicle to mark 650 years of the municipality.

== Barvínek ==
In 1997, Černý greeted an initiative of several citizens of the microregion (comprising the communities of Podomí, Krásensko, Ruprechtov and Senetářov) and helped to establish a civic association for the advancement of extracurricular education of children and young people. He was delighted by the proposal to call the new association "Barvínek" as a token of appreciation by his fellow citizens. "Barvínek" stood in good stead to Černý in the reclamation of a local well, and worked to edit the Podomí Chronicles and to organize an exhibition on his life and scientific as well as artistic endeavours. Together, they published the book Drahanská vrchovina and staked out an educational hiking trail of the same name (with five information desks). Barvínek activists helped Černý in his late years with the archaeological research of decayed settlements and organised his lectures and public meetings. He also wrotte "Zaniklé středověké osady a jejich plužiny", where he describe medieval villages in the Drahany Highlands in 1979. This book is manual for archaeologist, where he describe how you can find medieval village and how to document it.
