= Komořany (Vyškov District) =

- Municipality
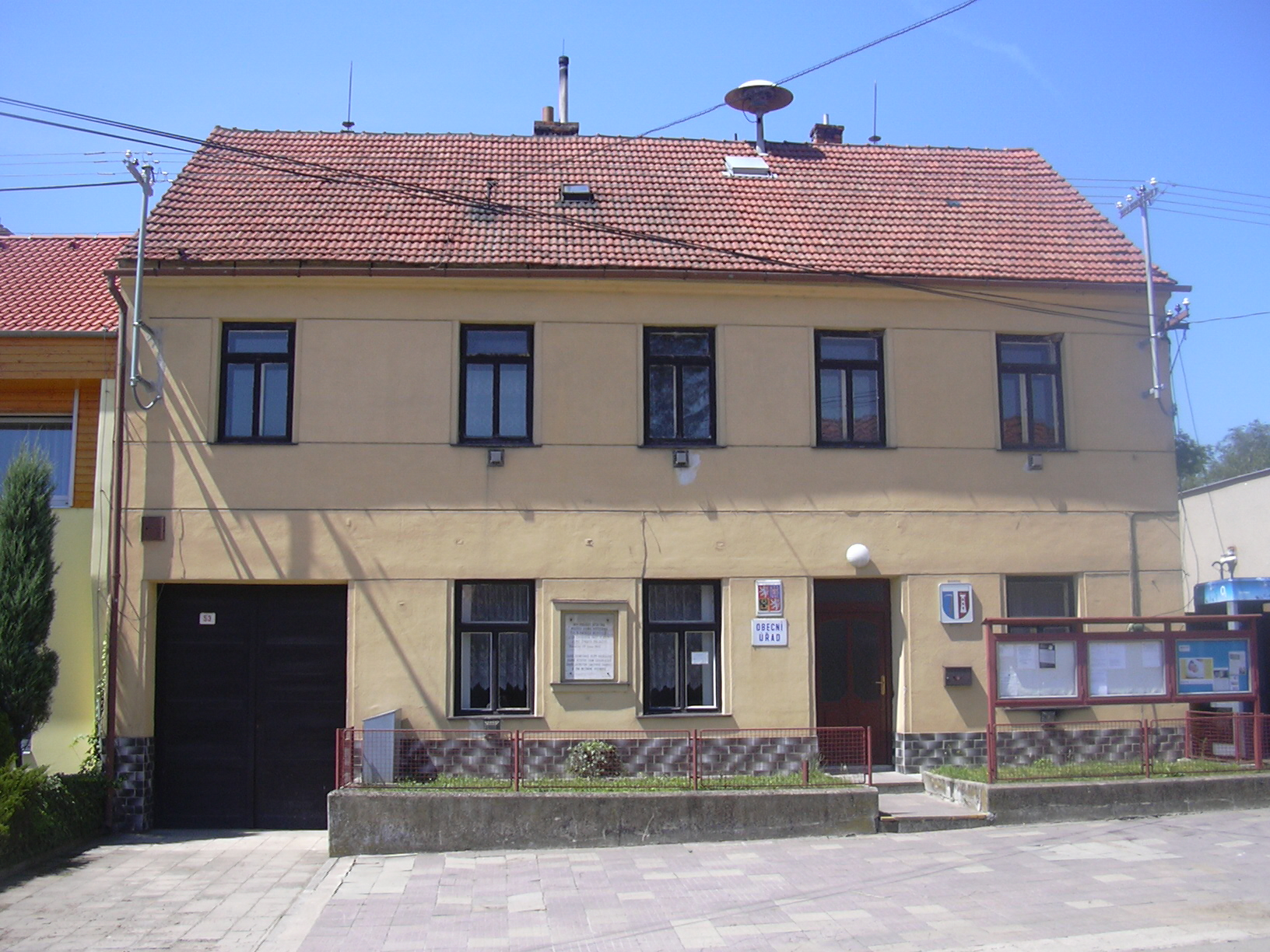
- Municipal office

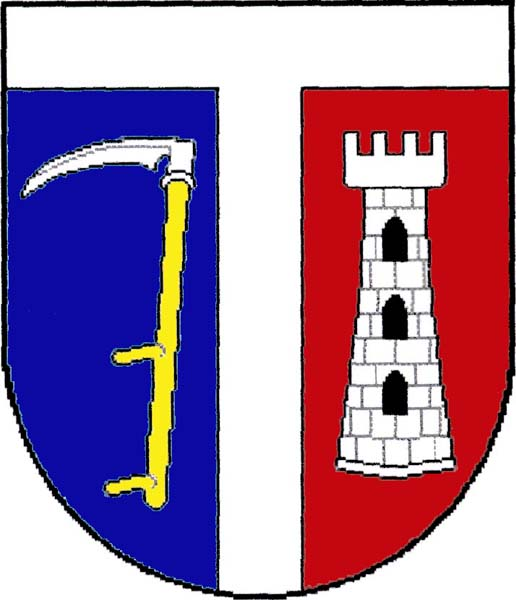
- Flag Coat of arms

- Location in the Czech Republic
- Coordinates: 49°12′59″N 16°54′24″E
- Country: Czech Republic
- Region: South Moravian
- District: Vyškov
- First mentioned: 1340

Area
  - Total: 5.85 km^{2} (2.26 sq mi)
- Elevation: 244 m (801 ft)

Population (2026-01-01)
  - Total: 781
  - Density: 134/km^{2} (346/sq mi)
- Time zone: UTC+1 (CET)
  - Summer (DST): UTC+2 (CEST)
- Postal code: 683 01
- Website: www.komorany.eu

Komořany (German: Gundrum) is a municipality and village in Vyškov District in the South Moravian Region of the Czech Republic. It has about 800 inhabitants.

== Etymology ==
The name is derived from the Czech words komora ('chamber') and komořan (meaning "inhabitant of a chamber").

== Geography ==
Komořany is located about 9 kilometres (6 mi) southwest of Vyškov and 20 km (12 mi) east of Brno. The northern part of the municipal territory with the built-up area lies in the Vyškov Gate and the southern part lies in the Litenčice Hills. The highest point is a nameless hill at 332 m (1,089 ft) above sea level. The Rakovec Stream flows through the municipality.

== History ==
The first written mention of Komořany is from 1340. In 1832, a large part of the village was destroyed by a fire.

Until 1945, Komořany belonged to the German-speaking enclave called Vyškov Language Island. The area was colonised by German settlers in the second half of the 13th century. The coexistence of Czechs and Germans was mostly peaceful, which changed only after 1935, when many Germans tended to Nazism. In 1945, the German-speaking population was expelled.

== Demographics ==
Historical population

Year	Pop.	±%
1869	557	—
1880	525	−5.7%
1890	496	−5.5%
1900	499	+0.6%
1910	520	+4.2%

Year	Pop.	±%
1921	541	+4.0%
1930	657	+21.4%
1950	575	−12.5%
1961	606	+5.4%
1970	569	−6.1%

Year	Pop.	±%
1980	628	+10.4%
1991	621	−1.1%
2001	652	+5.0%
2011	706	+8.3%
2021	722	+2.3%

Source: Censuses

== Economy ==
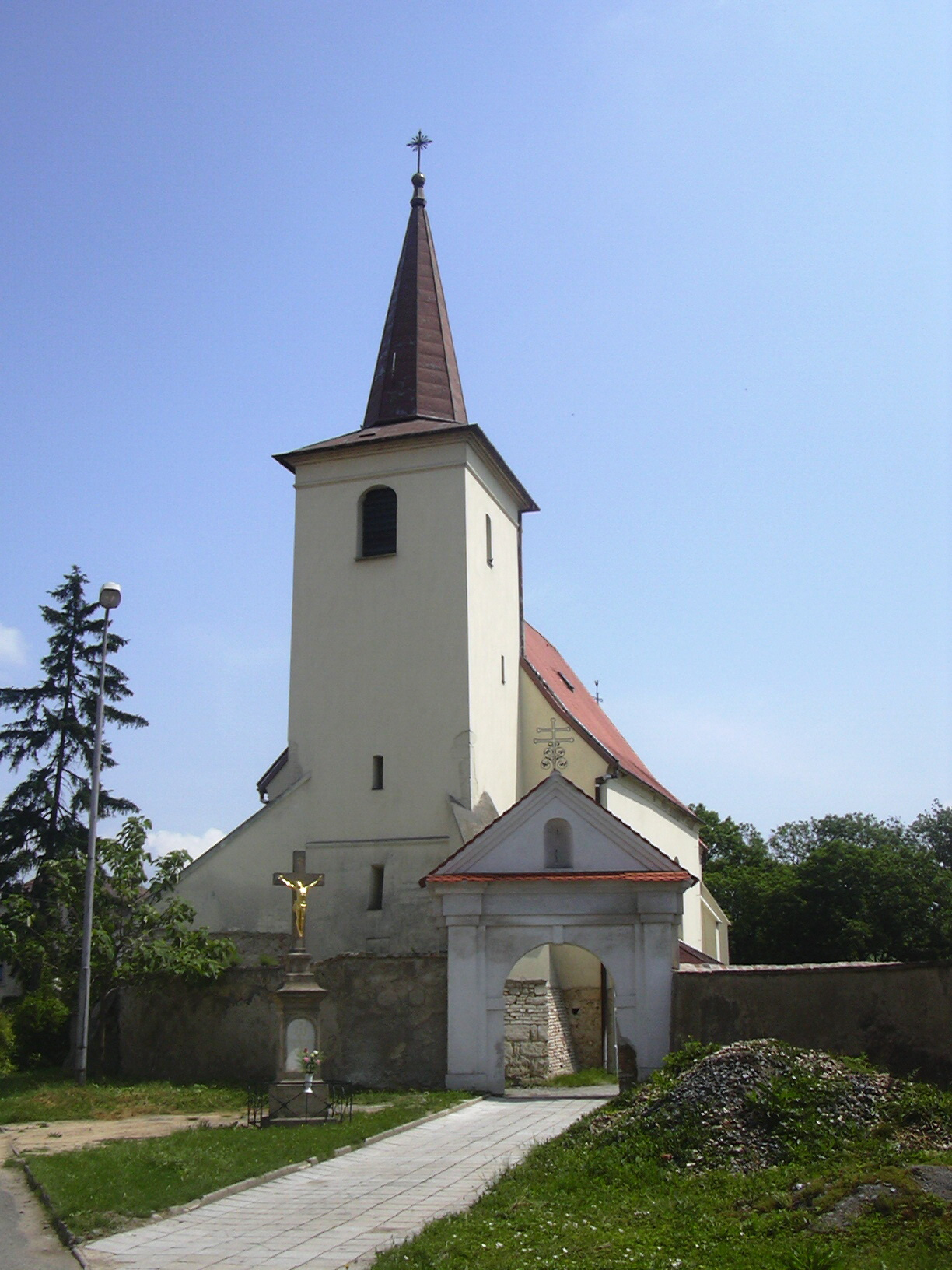
Church of Saint Barbara

Three large employers have their headquarters in Komořany: European Data Project (manufacturer of electrical devices for the gambling industry and equipment of casinos with more than 250 employees) and its subsidiaries, Paradise Casino Admiral (operator of casinos with more than 1,500 employees) and European Data Industries (manufacturer of fruit machines with more than 250 employees). All the three companies are part of the international gambling company Novomatic. They are based in an industrial zone on the northern outskirts of Komořany.

== Transport ==
The D1 motorway from Brno to Ostrava runs through the municipality. The railway that passes through Komořany is unused.

== Sights ==
The main landmark of Komořany is the Church of Saint Barbara. It was built in the neo-Gothic style in 1804 on the grounds of a Gothic church from the 14th century.
