= Matthias of Kunwald =

15th-century Czech priest

Matthias (Matěj) of Kunwald (died 1500) was one of the first priests of the Moravian Church of Bohemia in 1467.

== Early life ==
Matthias was a farmer's son from Kunvald. His date of birth is unknown but records indicate that he was twenty-five years old at the time of his ordination. He was elected a priest of the Moravian Church at the synod of Lhotka near Rychnov. (Note: The sources seem to say no more than "Lhotka near Rychnov", which makes identifying the location of the synod difficult if not impossible. Czech Wiki lists 8 places in the Czech lands called cs:Rychnov and 51 called cs:Lhotka. The best that can be said is that Rychnov nad Kněžnou has a long history, and is very close indeed to Kunwald; but that no place now called Lhotka is nearby.) The exact date of the gathering is unknown but is traditionally set as Holy Thursday, March 26, 1467. The synod decided that it was time for the Moravian Church to separate from the Roman order and establish their own priesthood.

== Career in priesthood ==
Matthias was selected as one of the first priests via a sortition (lot) process. After choosing nine members of the Unity that the synod attendees felt had gifts suitable for ministry, they took twelve slips of paper and wrote the words “it is he” on three of them. The slips of paper with those words would be called the positive lot because the members that drew those slips of paper would be selected as priests. It was also possible that none of the positives would be drawn, which would be seen as a sign from God that no priests should be selected.

Matthias was one of the three that drew a positive lot, thus becoming one of the first priests of the Unitas Fratrum. The other two to draw positive lots were Thomas (Tuma) Preloucsky, “a tailor who knew Latin,” and Elias of Chřenovice in Moravia, a miller. Matthias was approximately twenty-five or thirty years old at the time of the synod and was the youngest of the three chosen, but was appointed by Gregory the Patriarch as the first place among his Unity's priests.

The ordination of Matthias as a priest of the Unitas Fratrum was performed by Michael Bradacius. Bradacius was a Roman ordained priest but in order to satisfy some members of the Unity, he was sent to the "eldest Waldensian priest in Bohemia" because the Waldensians were believed to trace their roots back to the "uncorrupted pre-Constanian times of the apostles." After Michael Bradacius ordained Matthias, he renounced his Roman ordination and was himself ordained by Matthias.

Matthias of Kunvald became the leader of the Unity in 1474 when Gregory the Patriarch died and assumed the position as the church's administrative head. The years after Gregory's death were a period of difficult transition for the Unity. Matthias and many of the older members of the Unity wanted the strict standards of living required for membership to remain unchanged. However, newer members that were university trained began to question if the strict standards were necessary. This eventually resulted in the Schism of 1495 that divided the Unity with Matthias and those that agreed with him comprising the Minor Party. Matthias eventually resigned his administrative title but "retained his ability to ordain." Matthias consecrated Thomas (Tuma) and Elias as bishops of the Unity in 1499.

== Death ==
He died in 1500 at the approximate age of 58 on his way to a synod at Přerov.
