= Čierny =

Čierny (pronounced [ˈtʂɪerni], feminine: Čierna [ˈtʂɪerna]) is a Slovak-language surname, the counterpart of the Czech surname Černý. Notable people with the surname include:

- Jozef Čierny (born 1974), Slovak professional ice hockey player
- Ladislav Čierny (born 1974), Slovak professional ice hockey player
