= Lysovice =

- Municipality
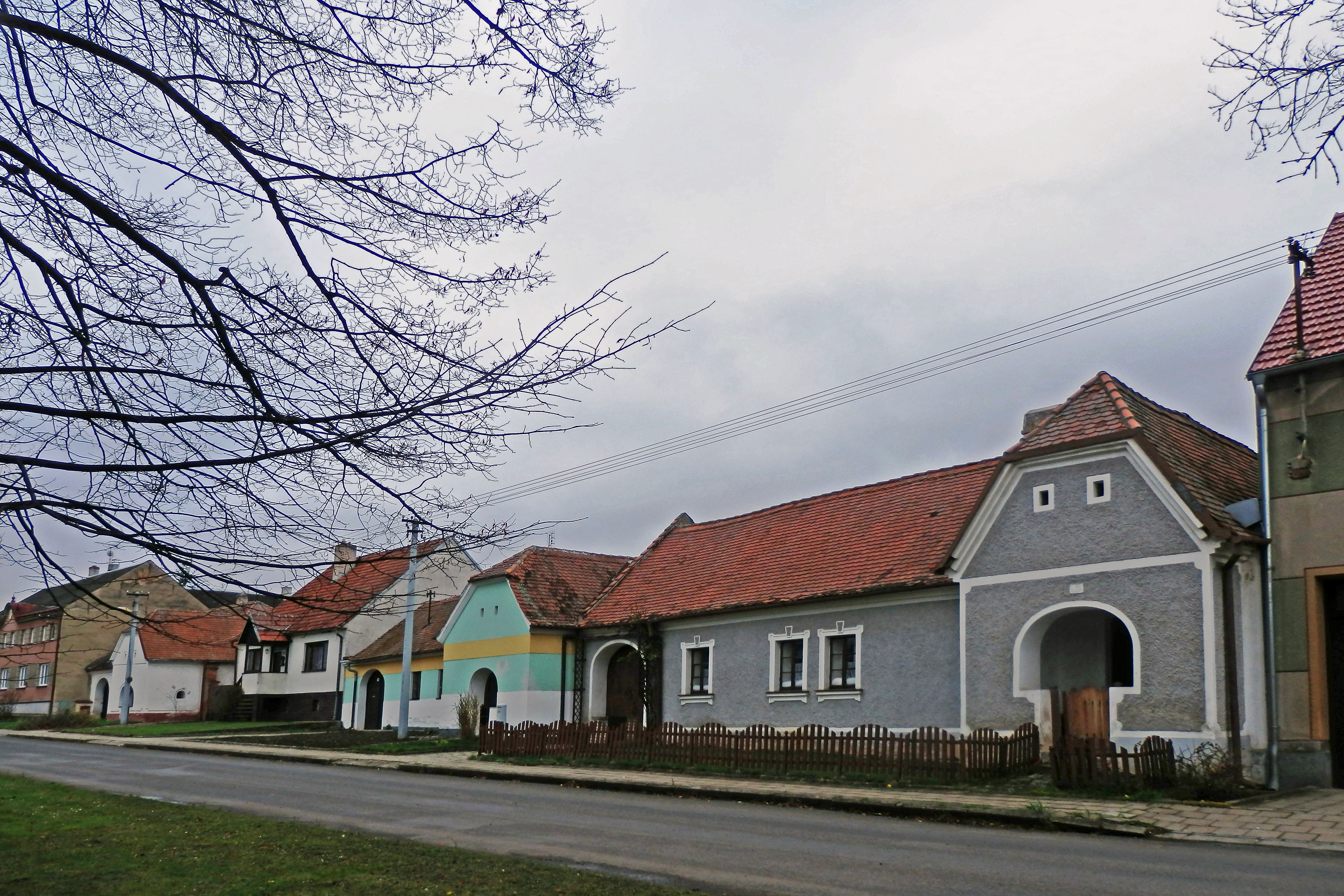
- Main street

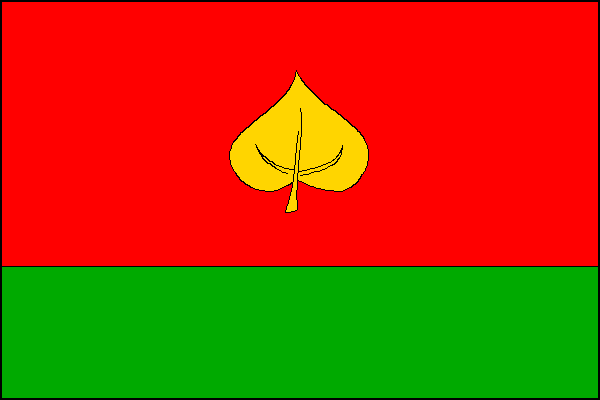
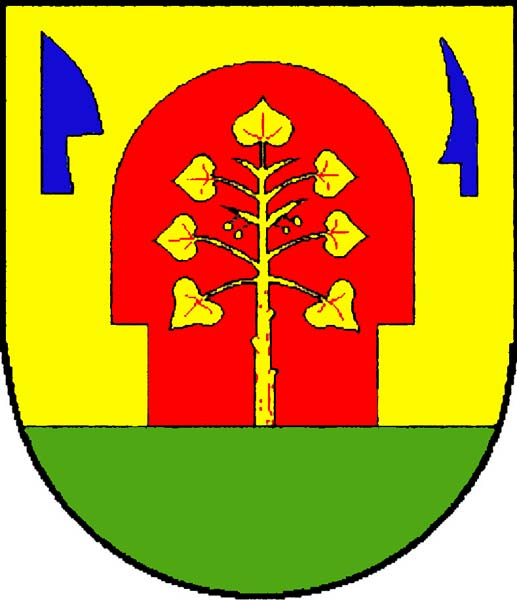
- Flag Coat of arms

- Location in the Czech Republic
- Coordinates: 49°13′5″N 16°58′14″E
- Country: Czech Republic
- Region: South Moravian
- District: Vyškov
- First mentioned: 1465

Area
  - Total: 5.30 km^{2} (2.05 sq mi)
- Elevation: 270 m (890 ft)

Population (2026-01-01)
  - Total: 300
  - Density: 57/km^{2} (150/sq mi)
- Time zone: UTC+1 (CET)
  - Summer (DST): UTC+2 (CEST)
- Postal code: 682 01
- Website: obeclysovice.cz

Lysovice (German: Lissowitz) is a municipality and village in Vyškov District in the South Moravian Region of the Czech Republic. It has about 300 inhabitants.

== Geography ==
Lysovice is located about 7 kilometres (4 mi) south of Vyškov and 23 km (14 mi) east of Brno. It lies on the border between the Vyškov Gate and Litenčice Hills. The highest point is the hill Lysovický kopec at 333 m (1,093 ft) above sea level. The stream Rostěnický potok flows through the municipality. The brook Lysovický potok flows through the village before it joins the Rostěnický potok.

== History ==
The first written mention of Lysovice is from 1465. Lysovice was referred to as property of the Dominican convent in Olomouc in 1519 and probably was its property since foundation of the village. In 1685, the convent sold the village to Count Dominik Ondřej of Kaunitz, who joined it to his Slavkov estate.

Until 1945, Lysovice belonged to the German-speaking enclave called Vyškov Language Island. The coexistence of Czechs and Germans was mostly peaceful, which changed only after 1935, when many Germans tended to Nazism. In 1945, the German-speaking population was expelled and the municipality was resettled by Czech and Volhynian Czech families.

== Demographics ==
Historical population

Year	Pop.	±%
1869	398	—
1880	397	−0.3%
1890	424	+6.8%
1900	420	−0.9%
1910	433	+3.1%

Year	Pop.	±%
1921	438	+1.2%
1930	477	+8.9%
1950	423	−11.3%
1961	413	−2.4%
1970	336	−18.6%

Year	Pop.	±%
1980	283	−15.8%
1991	223	−21.2%
2001	237	+6.3%
2011	270	+13.9%
2021	280	+3.7%

Source: Censuses

== Transport ==
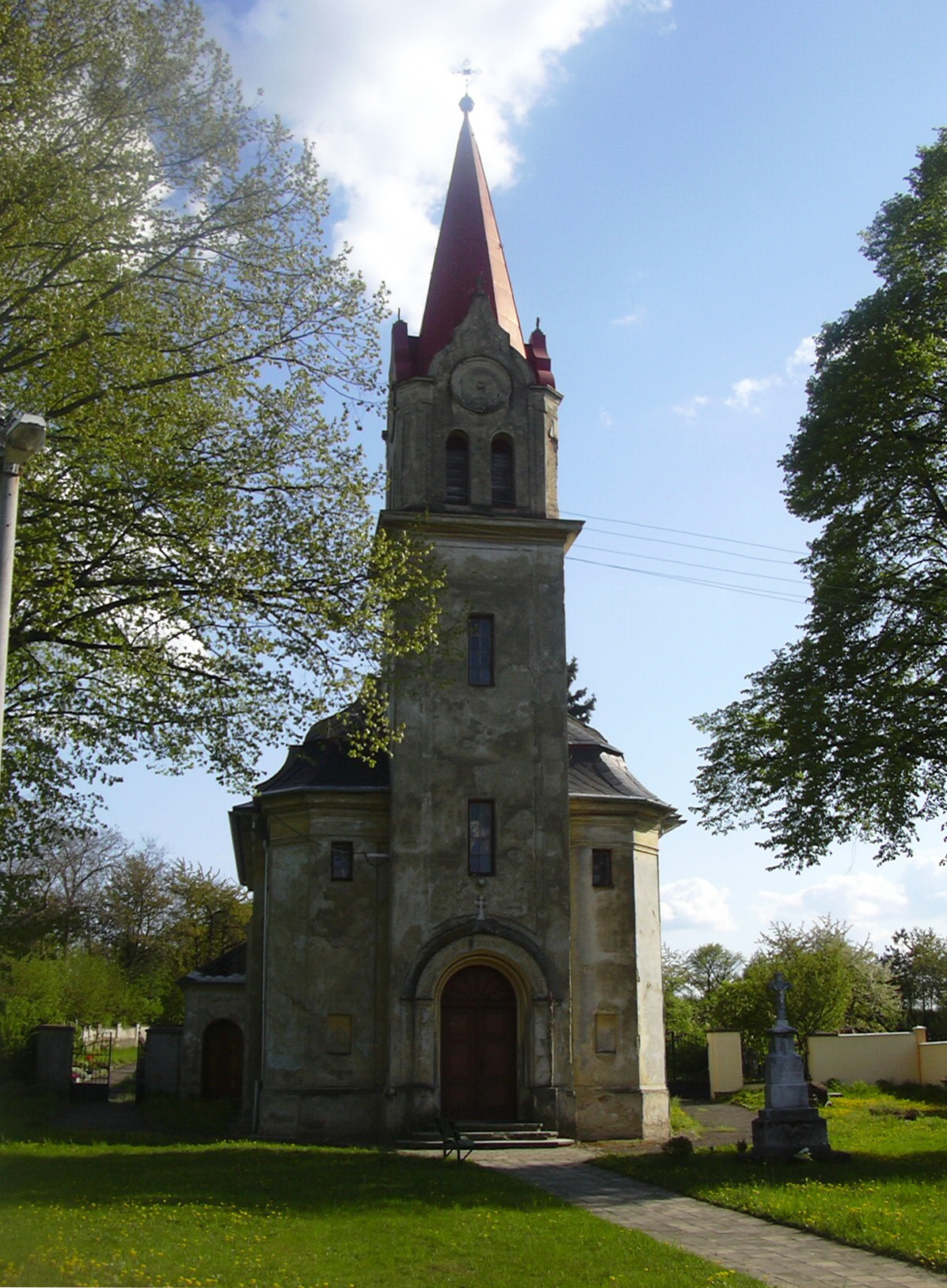
Church of Sacred Heart

There are no railways or major roads passing through the municipality.

== Sights ==
The main landmark of Lysovice is the Church of Sacred Heart. It was built in the pseudo-Historicism style in 1926.

Lysovice consists of well-preserved farmsteads from the beginning of the 19th century, supplemented by younger buildings, and is protected as a village monument zone. The houses here are characterised by the so-called žudry, which are massive risalits typical of the folk architecture of this area.
