= Rostěnice-Zvonovice =

- Municipality
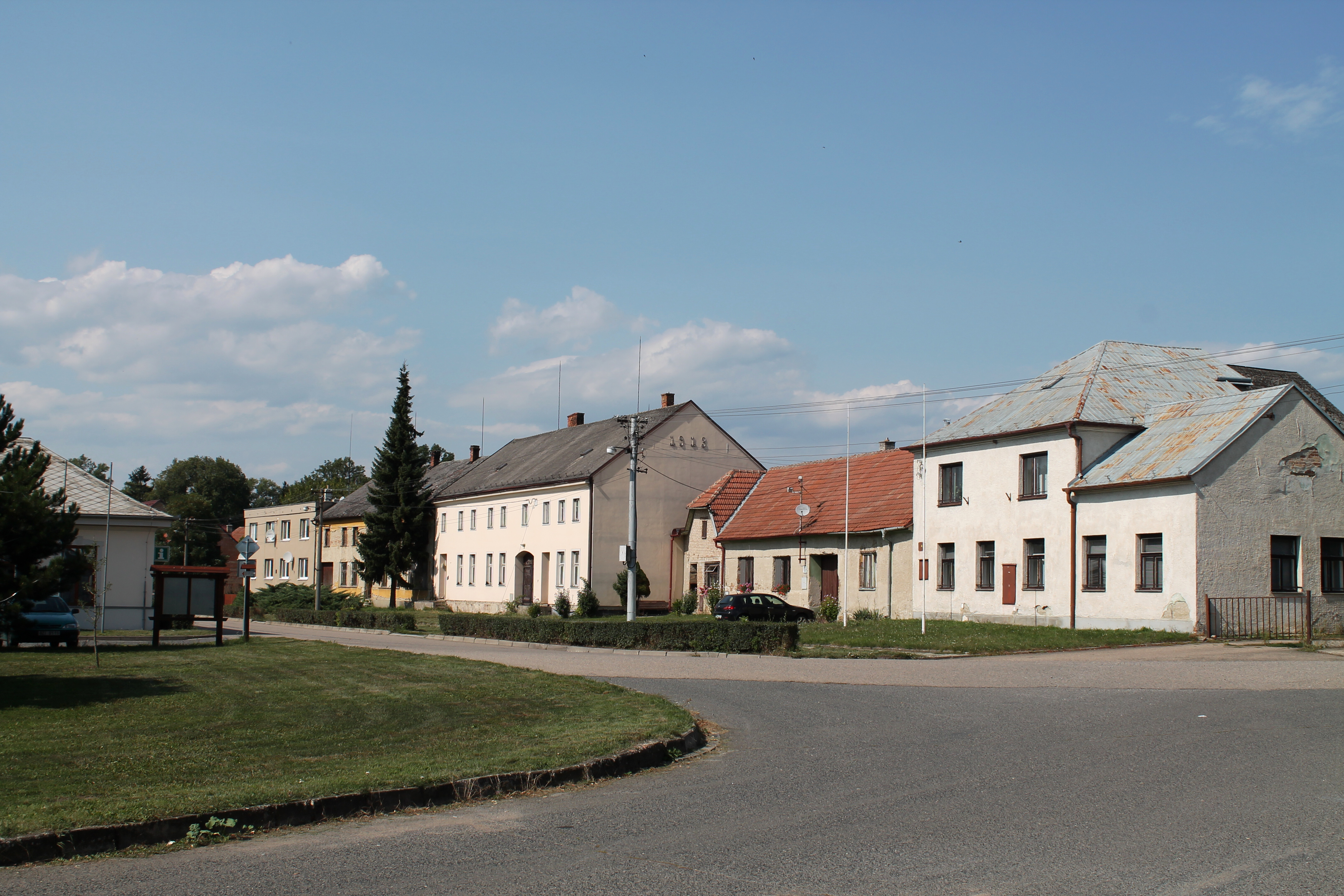
- Centre of Rostěnice

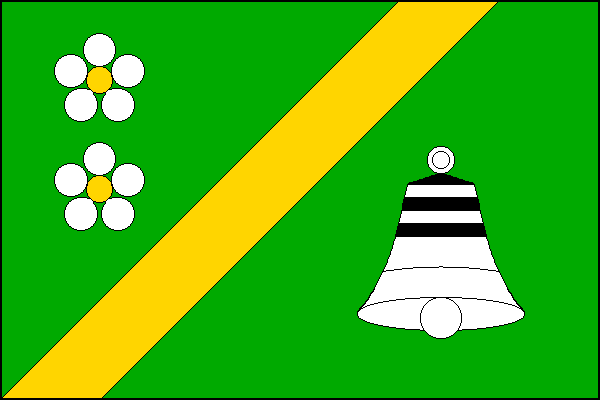
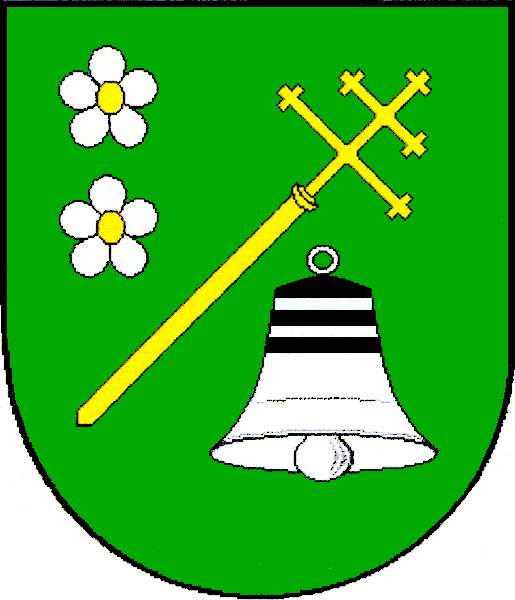
- Flag Coat of arms

- Location in the Czech Republic
- Coordinates: 49°14′21″N 16°57′51″E
- Country: Czech Republic
- Region: South Moravian
- District: Vyškov
- First mentioned: 1141

Area
  - Total: 7.52 km^{2} (2.90 sq mi)
- Elevation: 260 m (850 ft)

Population (2026-01-01)
  - Total: 650
  - Density: 86/km^{2} (220/sq mi)
- Time zone: UTC+1 (CET)
  - Summer (DST): UTC+2 (CEST)
- Postal code: 682 01
- Website: rostenice-zvonovice.cz

Rostěnice-Zvonovice (German: Rosternitz-Swonowitz) is a municipality in Vyškov District in the South Moravian Region of the Czech Republic. It has about 700 inhabitants.

== Administrative division ==
Rostěnice-Zvonovice consists of two municipal parts (in brackets population according to the 2021 census):

- Rostěnice (364)
- Zvonovice (163)

== Geography ==
Rostěnice-Zvonovice is located about 5 kilometres (3 mi) southwest of Vyškov and 23 km (14 mi) east of Brno. It lies mostly in the Vyškov Gate, only a small part of the municipality in the east extends into the Litenčice Hills. The highest point is the hill Špice at 304 m (997 ft) above sea level. The stream Rostěnický potok flows through the municipality.

== History ==
The first written mention of Rostěnice is from 1141. Zvonovice was first mentioned in 1355. Rostěnice and Zvonovice were merged into one municipality in 1960.

Until 1945, Rostěnice and Zvonovice belonged to the German-speaking enclave called Vyškov Language Island. The area was colonised by German settlers in the second half of the 13th century. The coexistence of Czechs and Germans was mostly peaceful, which changed only after 1935, when many Germans tended to Nazism. In 1945–1946, the German-speaking population was expelled and the municipality was resettled by Czech families.

== Demographics ==
Historical population

Year	Pop.	±%
1869	632	—
1880	664	+5.1%
1890	664	+0.0%
1900	690	+3.9%
1910	746	+8.1%

Year	Pop.	±%
1921	724	−2.9%
1930	723	−0.1%
1950	661	−8.6%
1961	578	−12.6%
1970	503	−13.0%

Year	Pop.	±%
1980	445	−11.5%
1991	415	−6.7%
2001	440	+6.0%
2011	506	+15.0%
2021	527	+4.2%

Source: Censuses

== Transport ==
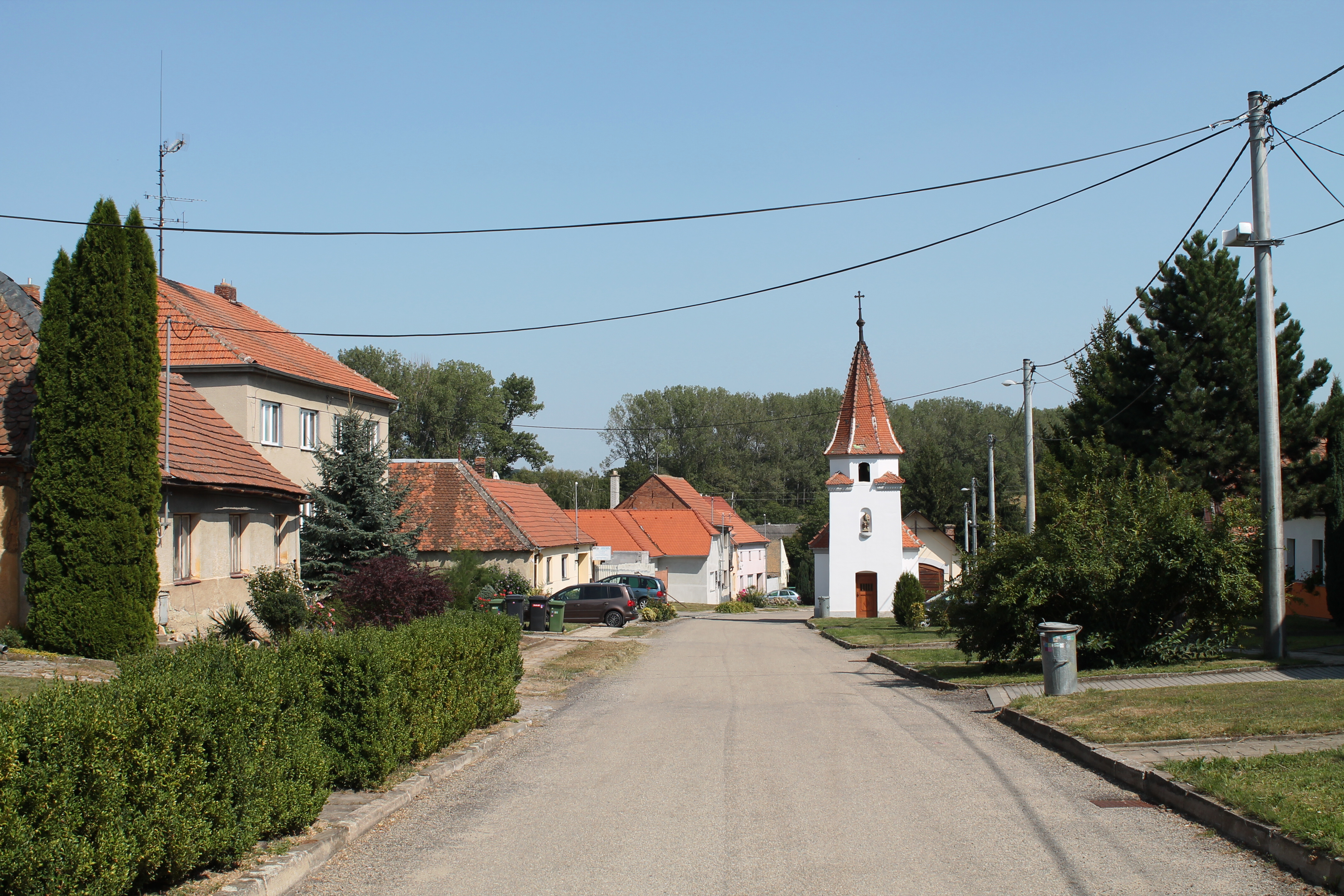
Centre of Zvonovice

There are no railways or major roads passing through the municipality. The D1 motorway from Brno to Ostrava runs north of Rostěnice-Zvonovice, just outside the municipality.

== Sights ==
The main landmark is the Chapel of Saint Bartholomew, located in Zvonovice. It was built in second half of the 18th century and modified in the 19th century.

Both Rostěnice and Zvonovice consist of well-preserved farmsteads from the beginning of the 19th century, supplemented by younger buildings, and are protected as two separate village monument zones.
