= Nikolai Chernov =

Ukrainian-American mathematician

Nikolai Chernov (November 10, 1956 – August 7, 2014) was a Ukrainian-American mathematician. Since 1994, he worked at University of Alabama at Birmingham. In 2012, he became a Fellow of the American Mathematical Society.
