= Jakub Černý =

Czech ice hockey player

- Born: March 5, 1987 (age 39) Český Krumlov, Czechoslovakia
- Height: 6 ft 2 in (188 cm)
- Weight: 190 lb (86 kg; 13 st 8 lb)
- Position: Forward
- Shoots: Left
- team Former teams: Free agent HC Litvínov; HC České Budějovice; HC Strakonice; HC Most; TPS; Yunost Minsk; HC Energie Karlovy Vary; Piráti Chomutov; HK Spišská Nová Ves
- Playing career: 2006–present

Jakub Černý (born March 5, 1987) is a Czech professional ice hockey player. He is currently a free agent.

He played with HC Litvínov in the Czech Extraliga for five seasons, from the 2006–07 Czech Extraliga season till the 2010–11 Czech Extraliga season. In 2011 he moved to TPS, which plays in the SM-liiga, the top professional ice hockey league in Finland.

Černý has played for the Czech Republic men's national under-18 ice hockey team in the 2005 IIHF World U18 Championships and for the Czech Republic men's national junior ice hockey team in the 2007 World Junior Ice Hockey Championships.

== Career statistics ==
=== Regular season and playoffs ===
			Regular season					Playoffs
Season	Team	League	GP	G	A	Pts	PIM	GP	G	A	Pts	PIM

=== International ===
Year	Team	Event	Result	GP	G	A	Pts	PIM
