= Jan Černý-Nigranus =

Czech bishop and historian

Jan Černý-Nigranus (1500 or 1510 – 5 February 1565) was a Czech historian, preacher and bishop of the Moravian Church.

== Life ==
He was born in Kunvald. In 1537 he was ordained bishop and worked in the congregation of Moravian Church in Brandýs nad Labem. During the persecution against the followers of the "Czech brothers" he escaped to Prague. He died in Mladá Boleslav.

== Works ==
- Acta Unitatis Fratrum (Akta Jednoty bratrské)
- Poznamenání některých skutků Božích obzvláštních
