= Podomí =

- Municipality
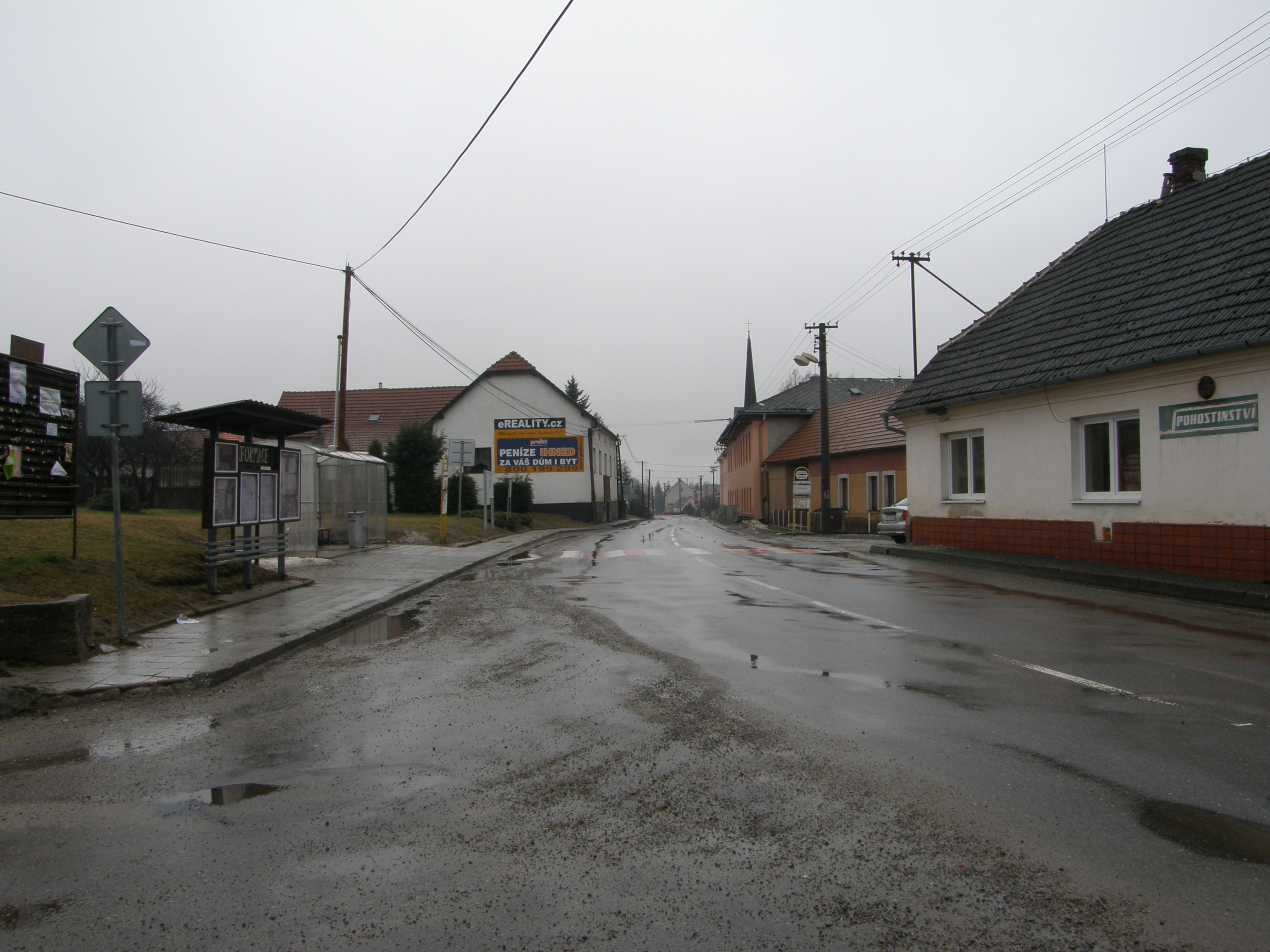
- Main street

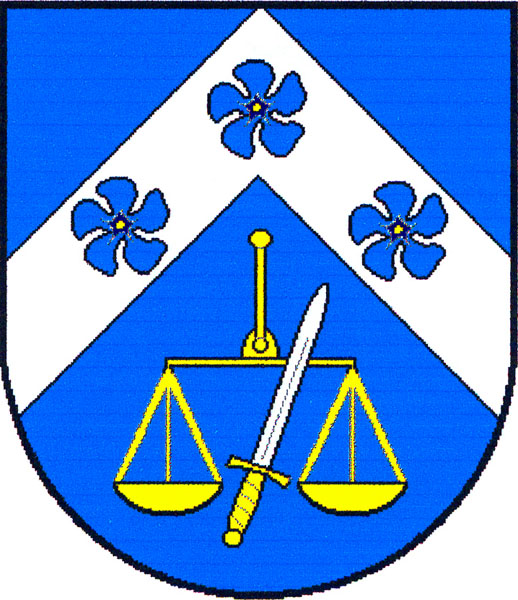
- Flag Coat of arms

- Location in the Czech Republic
- Coordinates: 49°20′41″N 16°50′0″E
- Country: Czech Republic
- Region: South Moravian
- District: Vyškov
- First mentioned: 1349

Area
  - Total: 5.46 km^{2} (2.11 sq mi)
- Elevation: 552 m (1,811 ft)

Population (2026-01-01)
  - Total: 459
  - Density: 84.1/km^{2} (218/sq mi)
- Time zone: UTC+1 (CET)
  - Summer (DST): UTC+2 (CEST)
- Postal code: 683 04
- Website: www.podomi.cz

Podomí is a municipality and village in Vyškov District in the South Moravian Region of the Czech Republic. It has about 500 inhabitants.

Podomí lies approximately 13 kilometres (8 mi) north-west of Vyškov, 24 km (15 mi) north-east of Brno, and 194 km (121 mi) south-east of Prague.

== History ==
The first written mention of Podomí is from 1349, when it was part of the Holštejn estate.

== Demographics ==
Historical population
| Year | Pop. | ±% |
|---|---|---|
| 1869 | 501 | — |
| 1880 | 540 | +7.8% |
| 1890 | 593 | +9.8% |
| 1900 | 612 | +3.2% |
| 1910 | 673 | +10.0% |
| 1921 | 602 | −10.5% |
| 1930 | 548 | −9.0% |
| 1950 | 493 | −10.0% |
| 1961 | 495 | +0.4% |
| 1970 | 465 | −6.1% |
| 1980 | 482 | +3.7% |
| 1991 | 435 | −9.8% |
| 2001 | 422 | −3.0% |
| 2011 | 413 | −2.1% |
| 2021 | 421 | +1.9% |
Source: Censuses

== Notable people ==
- Ervín Černý (1913–2001), medical doctor and archaeologist
