= Senetářov =

- Municipality
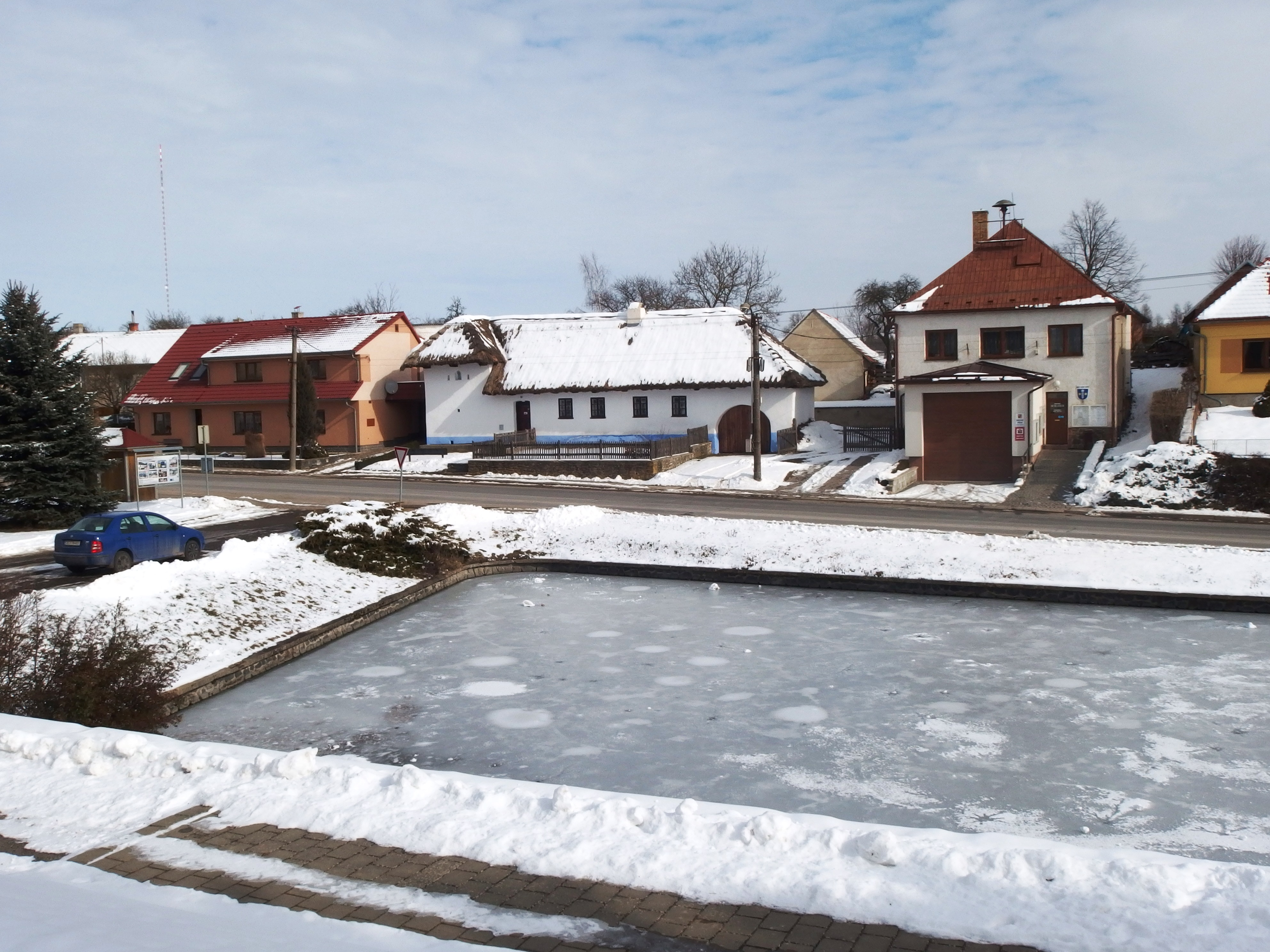
- Centre of Senetářov

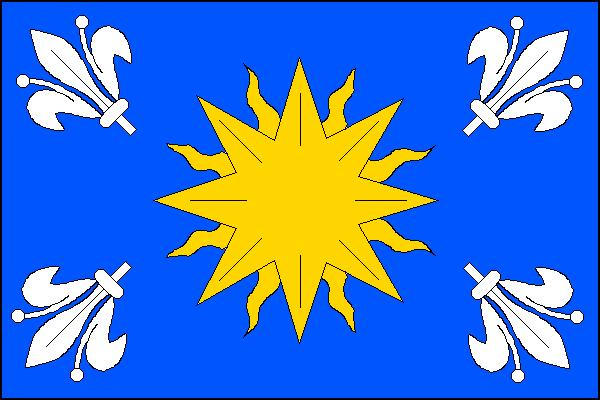
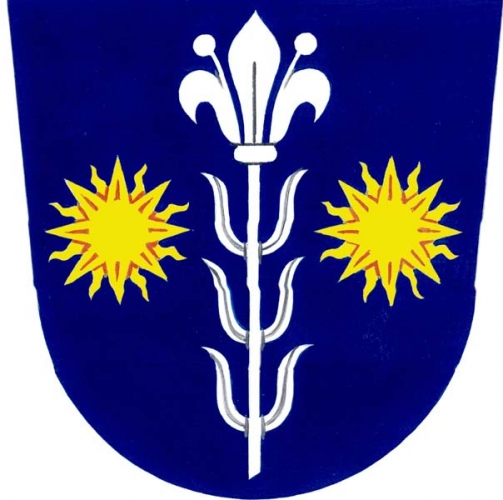
- Flag Coat of arms

- Location in the Czech Republic
- Coordinates: 49°21′17″N 16°48′14″E
- Country: Czech Republic
- Region: South Moravian
- District: Blansko
- First mentioned: 1349

Area
  - Total: 13.84 km^{2} (5.34 sq mi)
- Elevation: 545 m (1,788 ft)

Population (2026-01-01)
  - Total: 607
  - Density: 43.9/km^{2} (114/sq mi)
- Time zone: UTC+1 (CET)
  - Summer (DST): UTC+2 (CEST)
- Postal code: 679 06
- Website: senetarov.cz

Senetářov is a municipality and village in Blansko District in the South Moravian Region of the Czech Republic. It has about 600 inhabitants.

== Geography ==
Senetářov is located about 11 kilometres (7 mi) east of Blansko and 20 km (12 mi) northeast of Brno. It lies in the Drahany Highlands. The highest point is below the summit of the hill Kojál at 598 m (1,962 ft) above sea level. Several brooks flow through the municipality.

== History ==
The first written mention of Senetářov is from 1349, when the village was part of the Holštejn estate.

== Demographics ==
Historical population

Year	Pop.	±%
1869	725	—
1880	721	−0.6%
1890	747	+3.6%
1900	747	+0.0%
1910	746	−0.1%

Year	Pop.	±%
1921	711	−4.7%
1930	661	−7.0%
1950	584	−11.6%
1961	617	+5.7%
1970	598	−3.1%

Year	Pop.	±%
1980	542	−9.4%
1991	524	−3.3%
2001	493	−5.9%
2011	510	+3.4%
2021	568	+11.4%

Source: Censuses

== Transport ==
There are no railways or major roads passing through the municipality.

== Sights ==
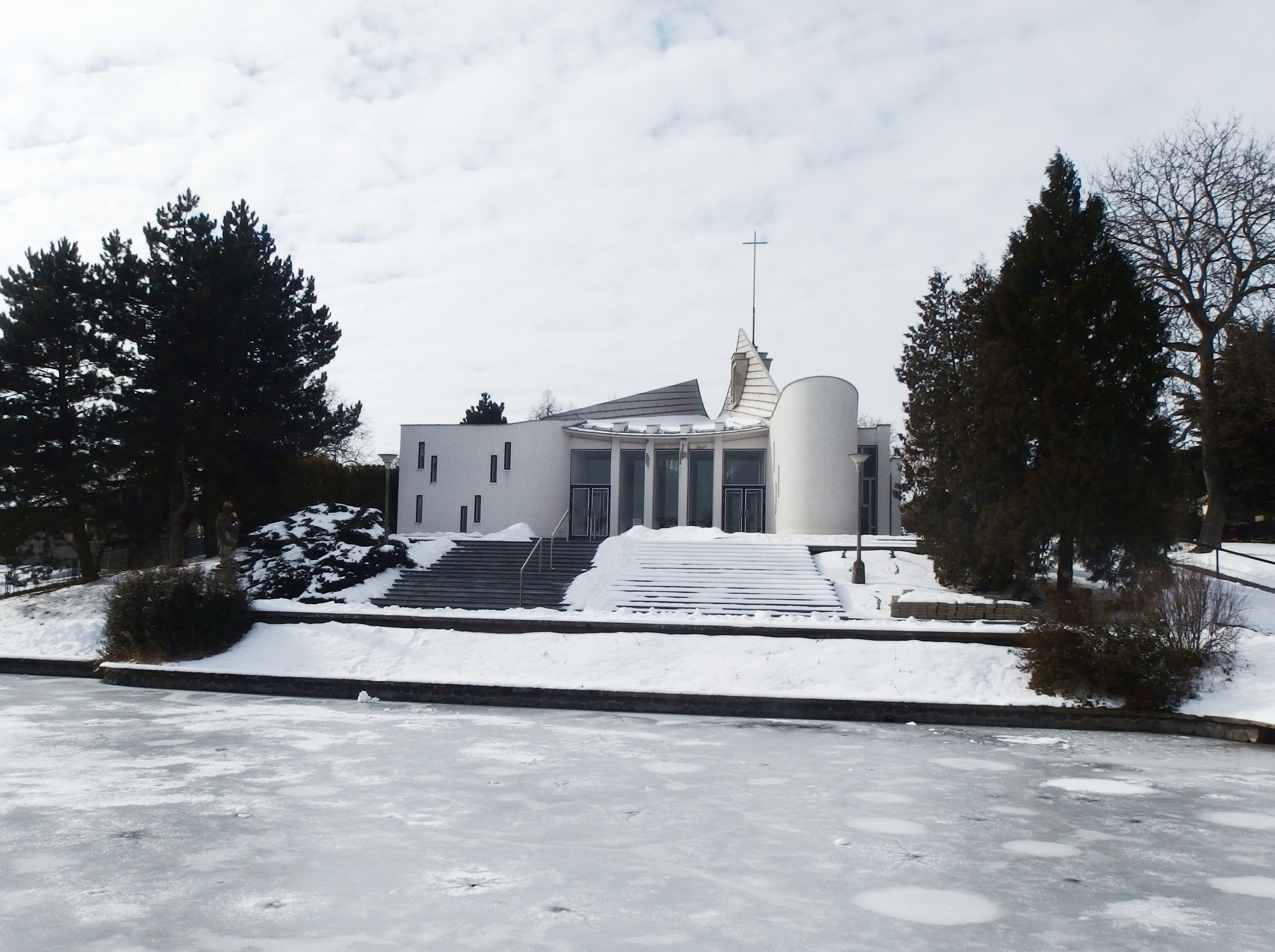
Church of Saint Joseph

Senetářov is known for the Church of Saint Joseph. It was built by the citizens in 1969–1971, during the Communist era when the construction permits for new churches were rare. The consecration of the church was attended by 15,000 people who came together from all over the country. The state secret police however closed all roads leading to the village, thus not allowing buses with Catholic worshippers to enter it. The mass attendees had to park in the fields and come on foot.

The church is an extravagant building, designed by architect Ludvík Kolek, who was inspired by Le Corbusier. Today, the building is considered a gem of modern architecture. The interior decoration is dominated by 14 paintings of the stations of the Cross by Mikuláš Medek.
