= Andrei Chernov =

Soviet and Russian programmer (1966–2017)

- Born: Andrei Aleksandrovich Chernov; 27 August 1966; Moscow, Russia
- Died: 16 August 2017 (aged 50); Moscow, Russia
- Other names: Andrew Chernov, Ache
- Education: Moscow State University
- Occupation: Programmer
- Known for: KOI8-R; Runet
- Website: http://zachem.ne.jp (formerly http://vniz.net)

Andrei Aleksandrovich Chernov (Russian: Андре́й Алекса́ндрович Чернов, romanized: Andréj Aleksándrovič Černóv; 27 August 1966 – 16 August 2017), also known as Andrew Chernov and Ache, was a Soviet and Russian programmer who was one of the founders of the Russian Internet and the creator of the character encoding KOI8-R.

He also hosted the website Vniz.net, which contained a collection of various rare pieces of media, including anime and art by Fin de siècle painters like Nicholas Kalmakoff, Louis Wain, and Franz von Bayros.

== Education ==
Chernov was born in Moscow on 27 August 1966. He graduated from Moscow State University in the 1980s.

== Career ==
Chernov was employed at the first Russian Internet service provider Demos, and worked on the computer network RELCOM which linked Russia to the global network.

He developed the Cyrillic character encoding KOI8-R, which he registered at the Internet Engineering Task Force in July 1993. In 1992-1996 he along with P. Sushkov worked on translation of the PGP software.

From 1993 to 2000, Chernov was a member of the FreeBSD Core Team. He is listed as contributor to the FreeBSD. In 2000 he participated in the first full-team BSDCon meeting. Earlier he was denied entry to the US as he was deemed "unsuitable".

Chernov died on August 16, 2017, at the age of 50 after a long illness. Before that he allegedly suffered from osteoporosis and a broken leg.

== Personal website ==
In December 2018, Chernov's personal website Vniz.net became unavailable due to the expiration of domain registration, after which it was reconstructed at the new address Zachem.ne.jp with the use of Wayback materials.
