= Kamil Černý =

Czech ice hockey defenceman

- Born: 20 November 1985 (age 40) Tábor, Czechoslovakia
- Height: 6 ft 0 in (183 cm)
- Weight: 181 lb (82 kg; 12 st 13 lb)
- Position: Defence
- Shoots: Left
- Czech 2.liga team Former teams: HC Tábor; HC Karlovy Vary; HC Litvínov
- Playing career: 2004–present

Kamil Černý (born 20 November 1985) is a Czech ice hockey defenceman playing for HC Tábor of the Czech 2.liga.

Černý played 60 games in the Czech Extraliga, playing for HC Karlovy Vary from 2008 to 2010, and for HC Litvínov from 2012 to 2017. He moved to HC Tábor on 10 August 2017, and has played an alternate captain for the team since.
