= Otakar Černý =

Czech sports journalist (1943–2021)

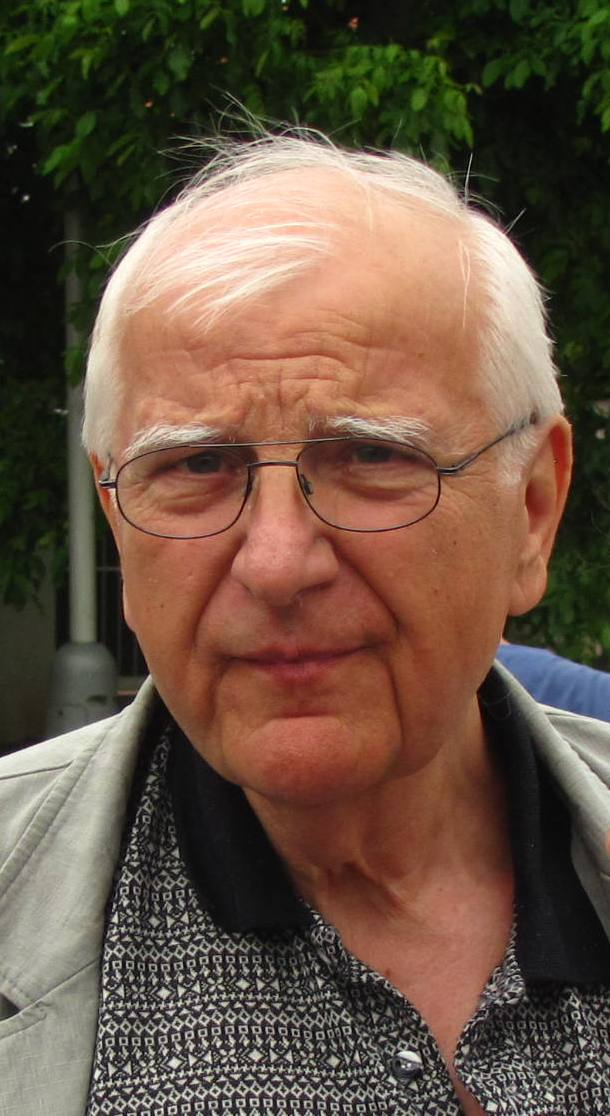
- Born: 10 September 1943; Kladno, Protectorate of Bohemia and Moravia
- Died: 16 February 2021 (aged 77)
- Occupations: Journalist; Television Host

Otakar Černý (10 September 1943 – 16 February 2021) was a Czech sports journalist and television presenter.

== Biography ==
Černý graduated from Charles University with degrees in mathematics and physics and subsequently taught the two subjects at a vocational school in Kladno. In 1969, he began working for Czechoslovak Television, which would become Česká televize. From 1969 to 1989, he worked for the sports editorial office. although he refused to join the Communist Party of Czechoslovakia. After the fall of Czechoslovakia, he moderated the television programs Debata and Co týden dal, where he would rise to fame.

After Ivo Mathé was removed as head of Česká televize, he left the company as well and became a spokesperson for the Czech Ministry of Health from 2000 to 2002. He was then editor-in-chief of Redakce sportu. He also participated in the launching of the independent news channel, ČT Sport, and moderated the sports discussion show Na slovíčko from 2008 to 2013. He retired in March 2013. He also served on the Commission of Referees of the Football Association of the Czech Republic from 2003 to 2011.

Otakar Černý died in February 2021, at the age of 77.

== Publications ==
- Co týden (ne)dal (1993)
- Díky, na viděnou!: vysoká politika očima televizního moderátora (1998)
- Brankám bylo padesát, aneb, Díky táto : Kladno, Praha a okolí 1969-2006 (2007)
- Třikrát a dost (2013)
- Divadlo na Kladně (2018)
- Sport na Kladně (2020)
