= Chernenko (surname) =

Chernenko, less commonly transliterated Tchernenko (Ukrainian: Черненко), is a surname of Ukrainian origin. Notable people with the surname include:

- Konstantin Chernenko (1911–1985), leader of Soviet Union from 1984 to 1985
- Albert Chernenko (1935–2009), Russian philosopher and son of Konstantin
- Anastasiya Chernenko (born 1990), Ukrainian triathlete
- Anna Chernenko (1913–2010), wife of Konstantin
- Artemi Tchernenko (born 1978), Russian tennis player
- Elena Chernenko (politician) (born 1957), Transnistrian politician
- Elena Chernenko (journalist), Russian journalist and antiwar activist
- Ruslan Chernenko (born 1992), Ukrainian footballer
- Vladimir Chernenko (born 1981), Uzbekistani rower
- Yevhen Chernenko (1934–2007), Ukrainian archaeologist
