= Prusy-Boškůvky =

- Municipality
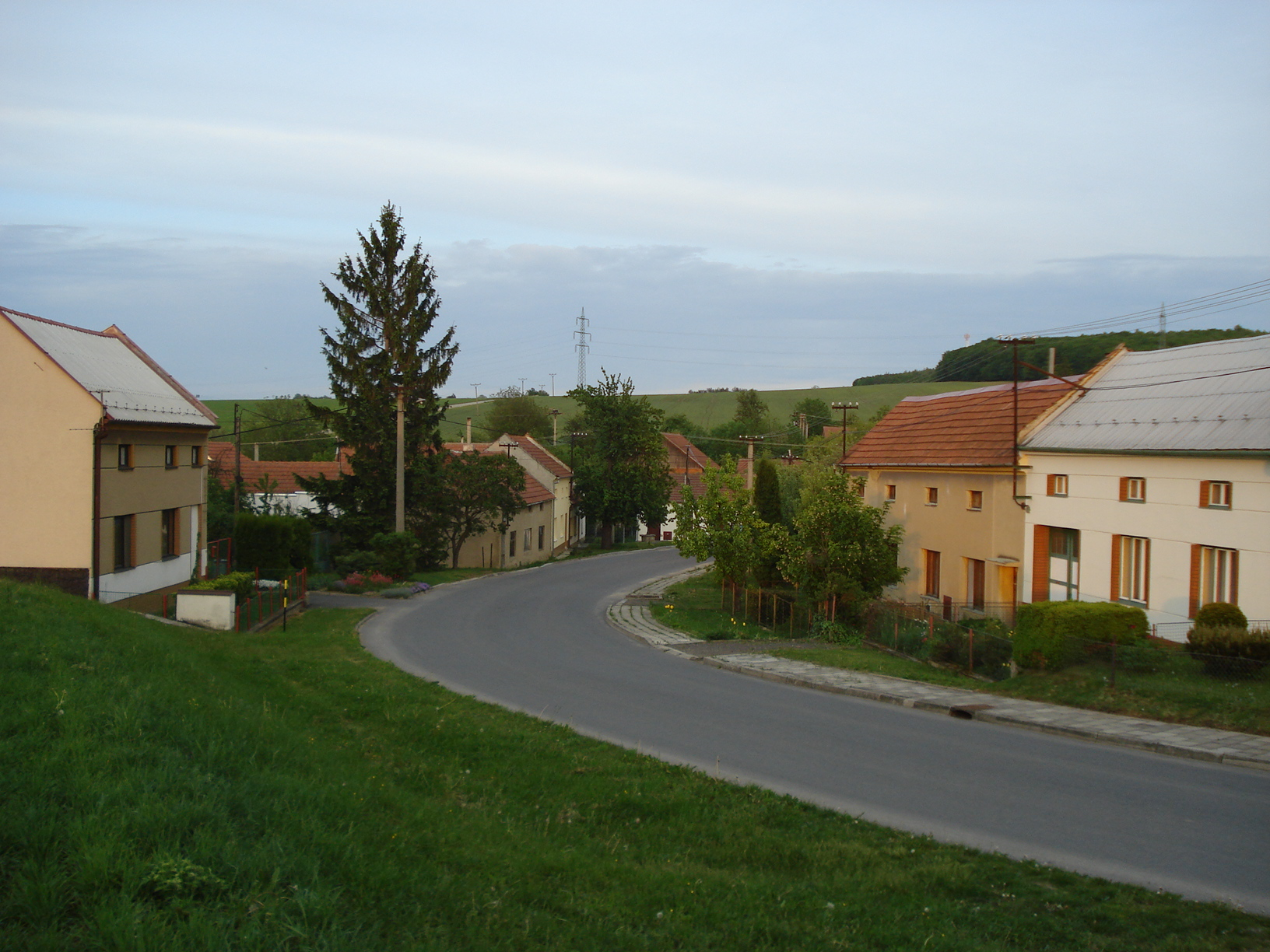
- View of Boškůvky

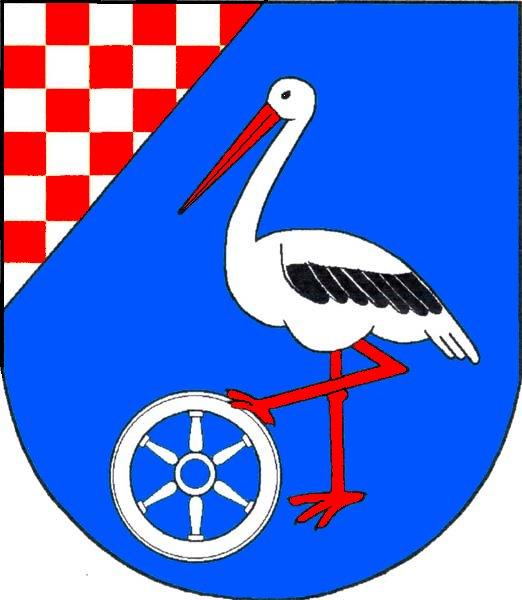
- Flag Coat of arms

- Location in the Czech Republic
- Coordinates: 49°15′10″N 17°3′32″E
- Country: Czech Republic
- Region: South Moravian
- District: Vyškov
- First mentioned: 1349

Area
  - Total: 7.73 km^{2} (2.98 sq mi)
- Elevation: 265 m (869 ft)

Population (2026-01-01)
  - Total: 702
  - Density: 90.8/km^{2} (235/sq mi)
- Time zone: UTC+1 (CET)
  - Summer (DST): UTC+2 (CEST)
- Postal code: 683 27
- Website: www.prusy-boskuvky.eu

Prusy-Boškůvky is a municipality in Vyškov District in the South Moravian Region of the Czech Republic. It has about 700 inhabitants.

== Administrative division ==
Prusy-Boškůvky consists of three municipal parts (in brackets population according to the 2021 census):

- Boškůvky (71)
- Moravské Prusy (554)
- Zouvalka (7)

== Geography ==
Prusy-Boškůvky is located about 5 kilometres (3 mi) southeast of Vyškov and 32 km (20 mi) east of Brno. It lies in an agricultural landscape in the Litenčice Hills. The highest point is at 355 m (1,165 ft) above sea level. The stream Pruský potok flows through the municipality.

== History ==
The first written mention of Prusy is from 1349. Boškůvky was first mentioned in 1465. Moravské Prusy and Boškůvky were merged into one municipality in 1964. Zouvalka was a municipal part of Vyškov in 1964–2016. Since 1 January 2017, it has been a part of Prusy-Boškůvky.

== Demographics ==
Historical population

Year	Pop.	±%
1869	514	—
1880	630	+22.6%
1890	735	+16.7%
1900	713	−3.0%
1910	828	+16.1%

Year	Pop.	±%
1921	892	+7.7%
1930	883	−1.0%
1950	838	−5.1%
1961	864	+3.1%
1970	783	−9.4%

Year	Pop.	±%
1980	704	−10.1%
1991	617	−12.4%
2001	605	−1.9%
2011	644	+6.4%
2021	632	−1.9%

Source: Censuses (Note: Including Zouvalka, which was part of Vyškov in 1964–2016.)

== Transport ==
There are no railways or major roads passing through the municipality, however, the D1 motorway from Brno to Ostrava runs north of Prusy-Boškůvky just outside the municipal territory.

== Sights ==
The main landmark is the Church of Saint George, located in Moravské Prusy. It is a valuable Baroque building dating from 1733. The author of the basic concept of the building was the architect Domenico Martinelli.
