= Olšany (Vyškov District) =

- Municipality
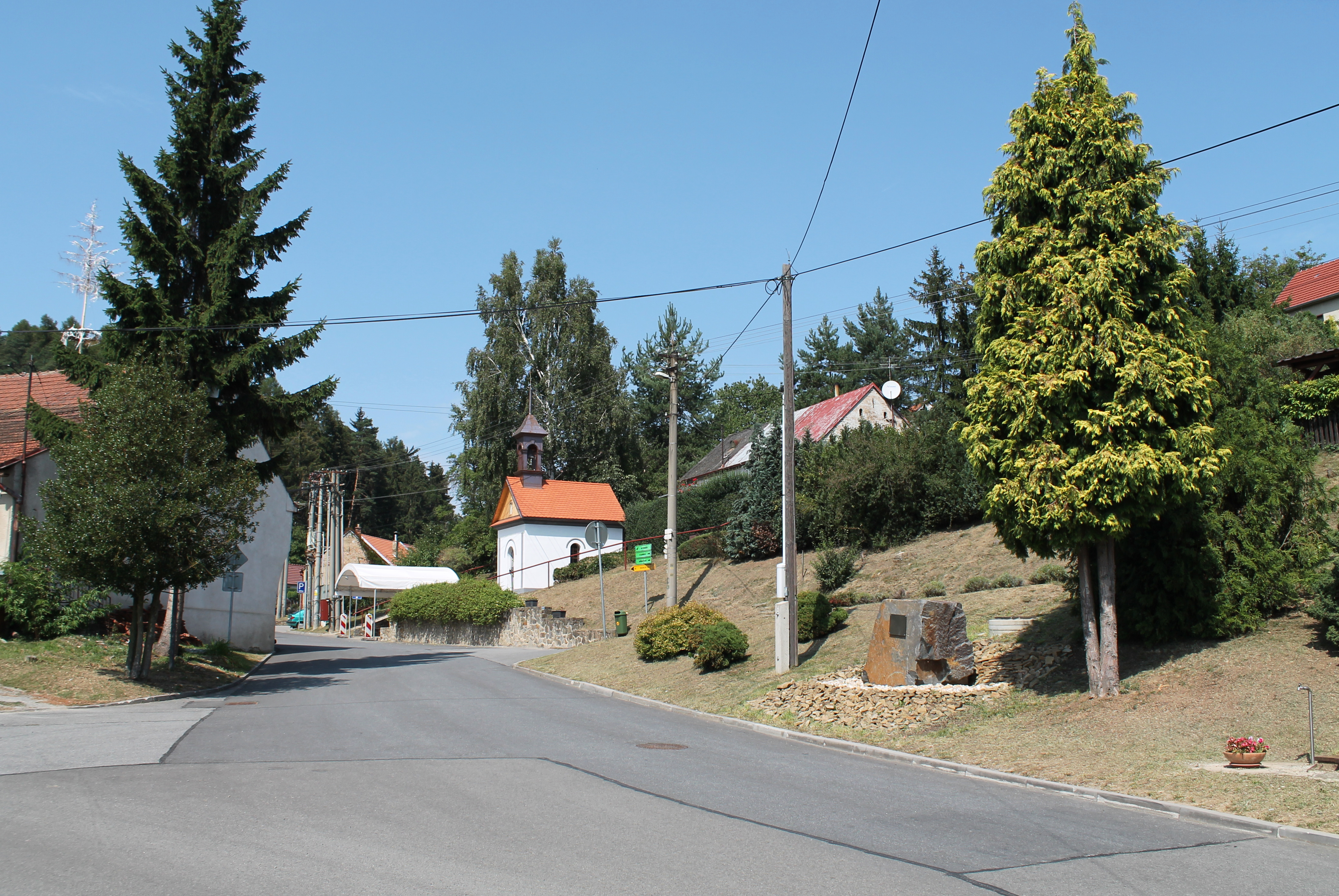
- Centre of Olšany

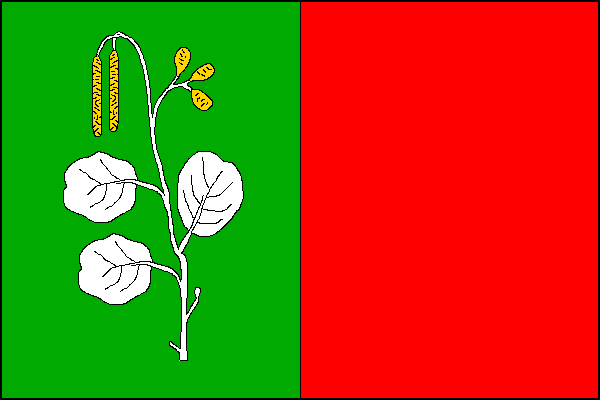
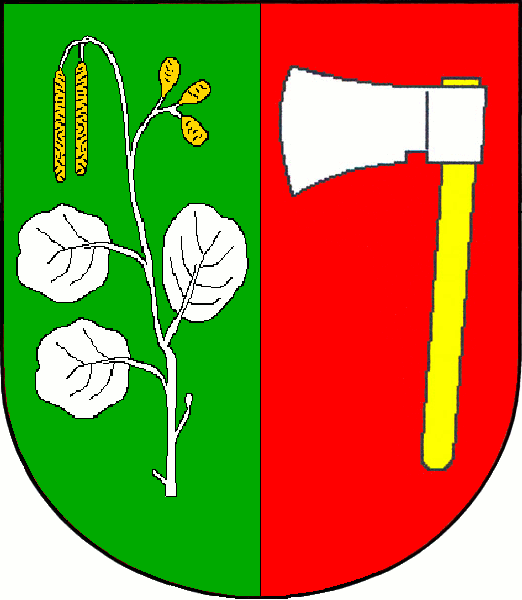
- Flag Coat of arms

- Location in the Czech Republic
- Coordinates: 49°14′53″N 16°51′58″E
- Country: Czech Republic
- Region: South Moravian
- District: Vyškov
- Founded: 1713

Area
  - Total: 18.68 km^{2} (7.21 sq mi)
- Elevation: 420 m (1,380 ft)

Population (2026-01-01)
  - Total: 642
  - Density: 34.4/km^{2} (89.0/sq mi)
- Time zone: UTC+1 (CET)
  - Summer (DST): UTC+2 (CEST)
- Postal code: 683 02
- Website: olsany.org

Olšany is a municipality and village in Vyškov District in the South Moravian Region of the Czech Republic. It has about 600 inhabitants.

Olšany lies approximately 10 kilometres (6 mi) west of Vyškov, 19 km (12 mi) east of Brno, and 199 km (124 mi) south-east of Prague.

== Demographics ==
Historical population
Year	Pop.	±%
1869	410	—
1880	424	+3.4%
1890	485	+14.4%
1900	508	+4.7%
1910	538	+5.9%
1921	553	+2.8%
1930	540	−2.4%
1950	467	−13.5%
1961	497	+6.4%
1970	476	−4.2%
1980	442	−7.1%
1991	438	−0.9%
2001	437	−0.2%
2011	544	+24.5%
2021	635	+16.7%
Source: Censuses
