= Nemojany =

- Municipality
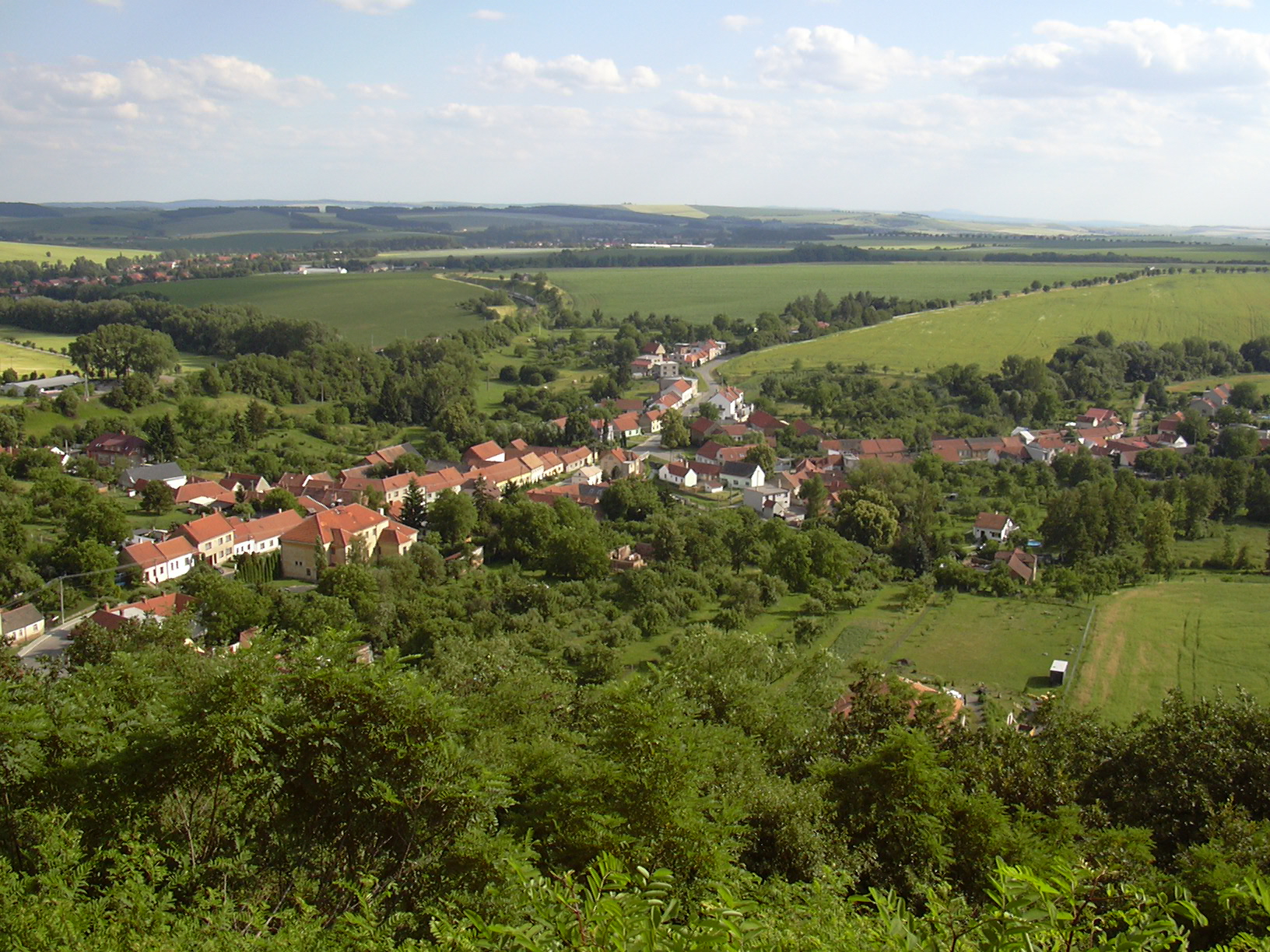
- General view

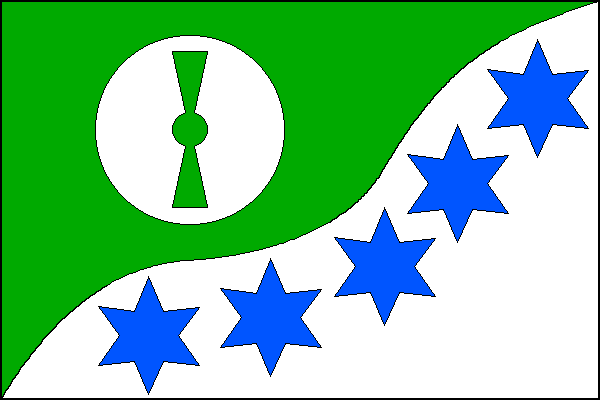
- Flag Coat of arms

- Location in the Czech Republic
- Coordinates: 49°14′48″N 16°54′49″E
- Country: Czech Republic
- Region: South Moravian
- District: Vyškov
- First mentioned: 1131

Area
  - Total: 6.01 km^{2} (2.32 sq mi)
- Elevation: 265 m (869 ft)

Population (2026-01-01)
  - Total: 912
  - Density: 152/km^{2} (393/sq mi)
- Time zone: UTC+1 (CET)
  - Summer (DST): UTC+2 (CEST)
- Postal code: 683 03
- Website: www.nemojany.cz

Nemojany is a municipality and village in Vyškov District in the South Moravian Region of the Czech Republic. It has about 900 inhabitants.

Nemojany lies approximately 7 kilometres (4 mi) south-west of Vyškov, 23 km (14 mi) east of Brno, and 203 km (126 mi) south-east of Prague.

== Demographics ==
Historical population
Year	Pop.	±%
1869	453	—
1880	475	+4.9%
1890	460	−3.2%
1900	474	+3.0%
1910	511	+7.8%
1921	524	+2.5%
1930	625	+19.3%
1950	566	−9.4%
1961	623	+10.1%
1970	613	−1.6%
1980	623	+1.6%
1991	539	−13.5%
2001	517	−4.1%
2011	654	+26.5%
2021	737	+12.7%
Source: Censuses
