= Vyškov Gate =

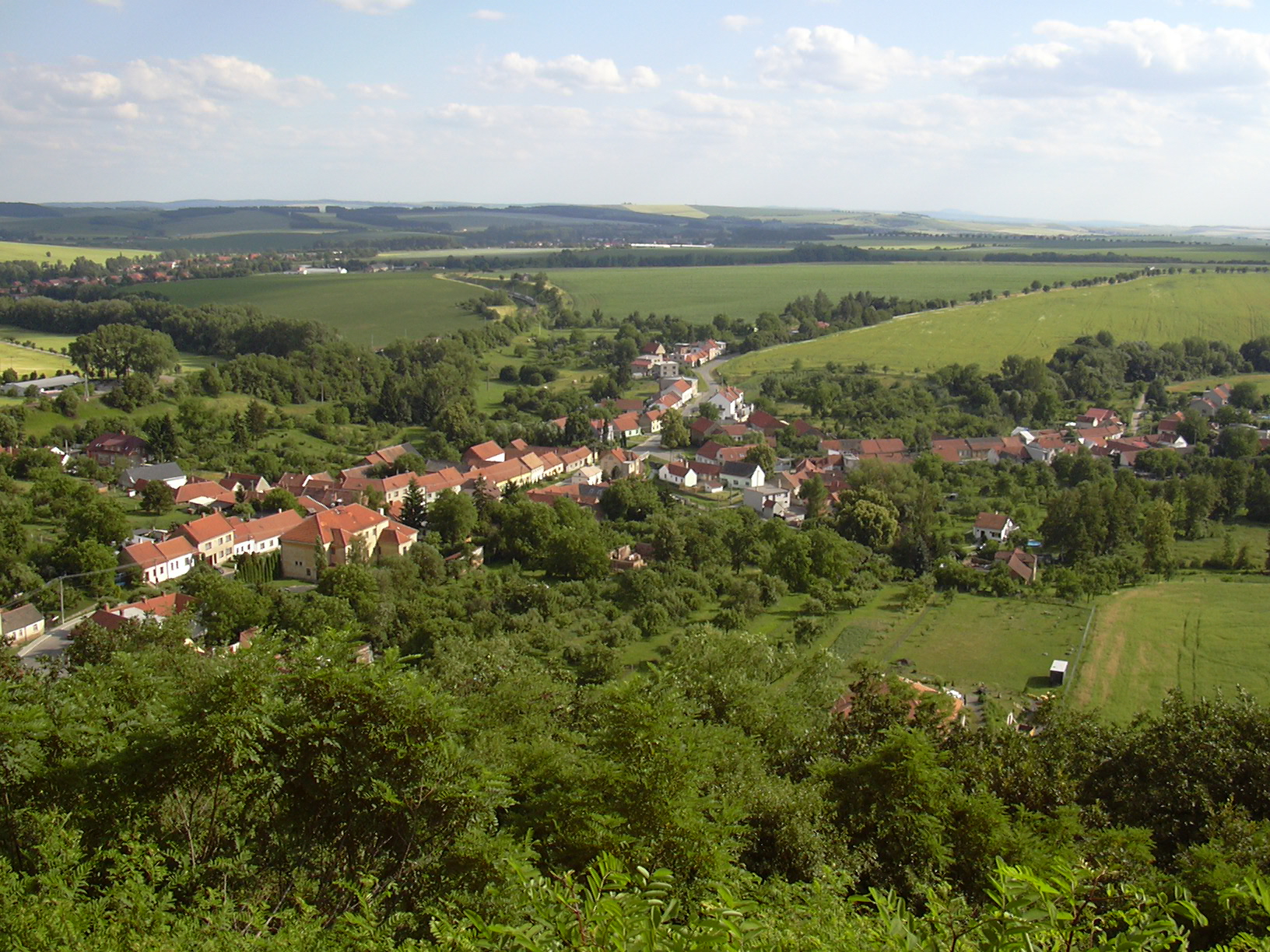
- Vyškov Gate – view to south from Nemojany

Highest point
- Peak: Na hanácké
- Elevation: 339 m (1,112 ft)

Dimensions
- Length: 17 km (11 mi)

Naming
- Native name: Vyškovská brána (Czech)

Geography
- Location within Czech Republic
- Location: Vyškovská brána CZ III1 A-2.png
- Countries: Czech Republic, Moravia
- Range coordinates: 49°00′N 16°30′E
- Borders on: Carpathians

The Vyškov Gate (Czech: Vyškovská brána, Polish: Brama Wyszkówska, German: Wischau Pforte, Slovak: Vyškovská brána) is a geomorphological feature in the Moravia (Czech Republic). It is formed by the depression between the Western Carpathian Mountains in the east and the Bohemian massif (Drahanská vrchovina) in the west. The drainage divide between the upper River Haná to the River Morava of the Danube basin runs through it and Rakovec brook (in the Dyje–Svratka Valley). The gate is between the Upper Morava Valley (in the north-east) and the Dyje–Svratka Valley (in the south-west), all in Outer Subcarpathian depression.

Including low watershed (drainage divide) Na hanácké – 339 m

The Vyškov Gate has been a natural pass between the Bohemian-Moravian province (Bohemian Massif) – Bohemian-Moravian Highland and the Carpathians (Chřiby) since ancient times. Here ran the most important trade routes from southern Europe to the Baltic Sea (e.g. the Amber Road) and also routes from Moravia to Upper Silesia and Lesser Poland. Today the D1 motorway leads from the Moravian capital Brno to Ostrava, the centre of the Moravian-Silesian Region. The Austrian Northern Railway (one part) built in 1869 from Brno to Přerov and Ostrava also traversed the Vyškov Gate.

== Gallery ==
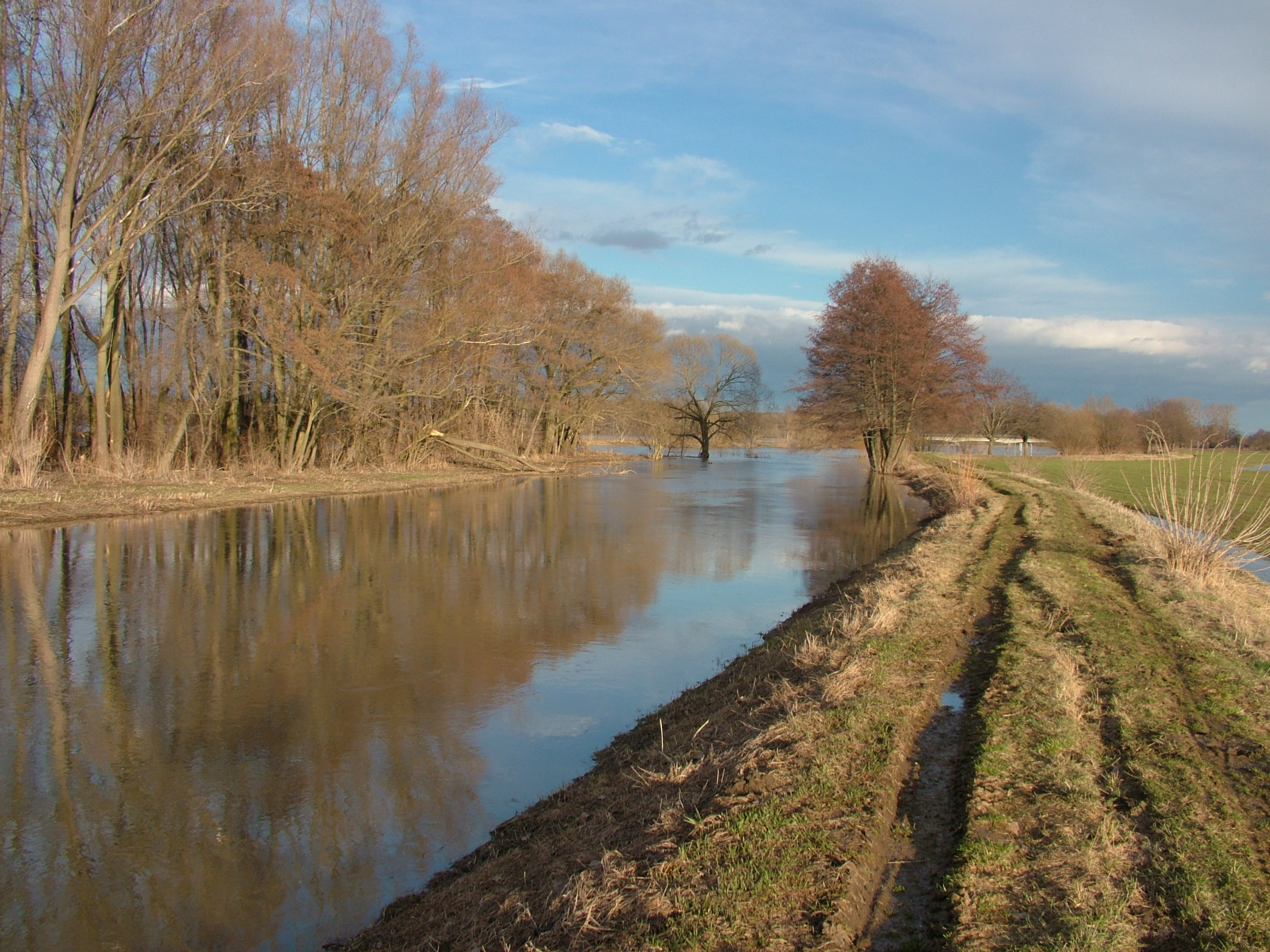
Haná River in Vyškov Gate

Moravian Carpathians (marked in red) within the Outer Western Carpathian

== See also ==
- South-Moravian Carpathians
- Moravian Gate
- Outer Subcarpathia
