= Brno =

Statutory city in the Czech Republic

- Statutory city
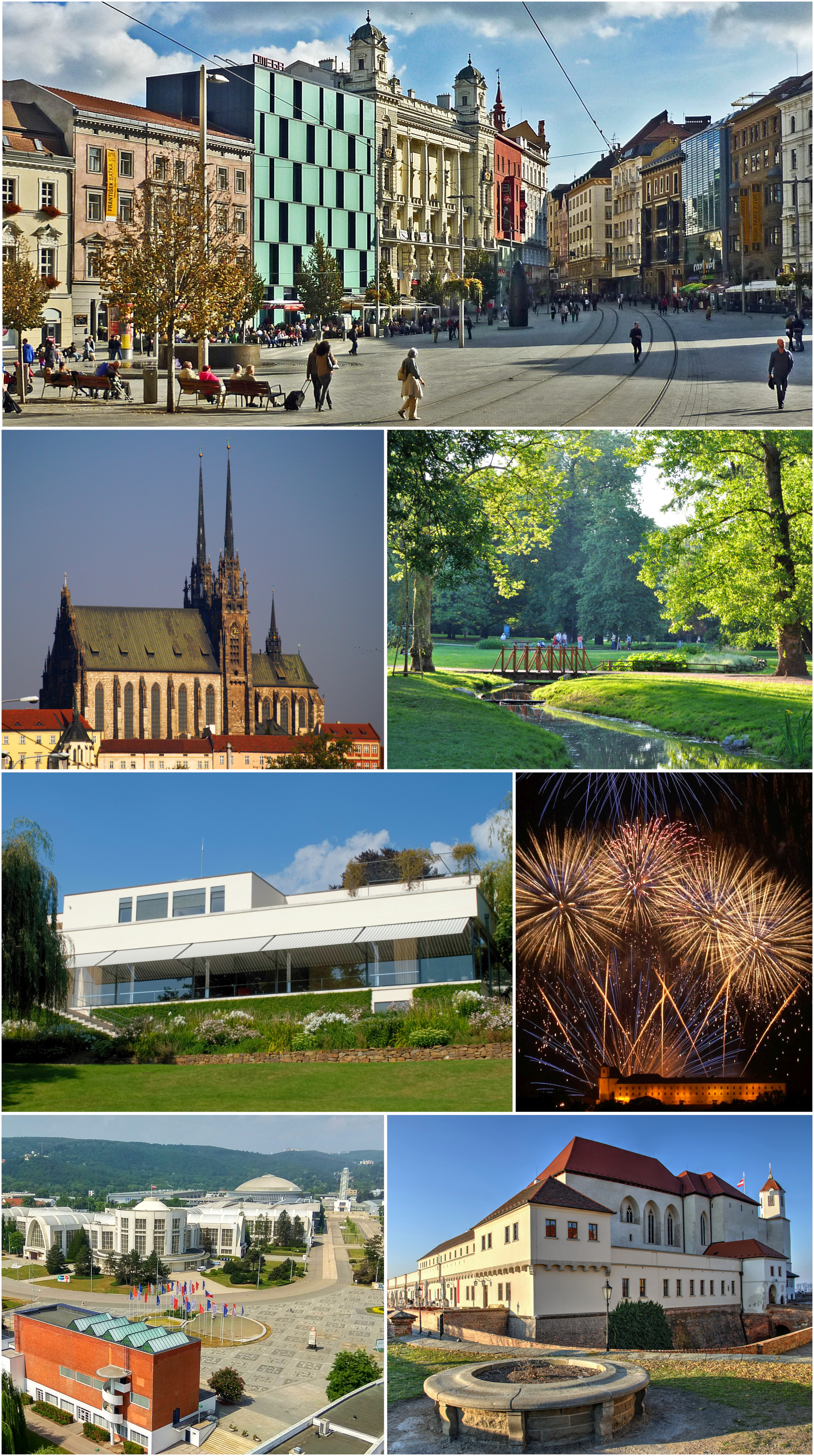
- Clockwise from top: Liberty Square; Lužánky Park; Ignis Brunensis; Špilberk Castle; Brno Exhibition Centre; Villa Tugendhat; and Cathedral of St. Peter and Paul

- Flag Coat of arms Logo

- Location within Czech Republic
- Coordinates: 49°11′33″N 16°36′30″E
- Country: Czech Republic
- Region: South Moravian
- District: Brno-City
- Founded: c. 1000

Government
  - Mayor: Jakub Hruška (KDU-ČSL)

Area
  - Statutory city: 230.18 km^{2} (88.87 sq mi)
  - Land: 225.71 km^{2} (87.15 sq mi)
  - Water: 4.47 km^{2} (1.73 sq mi)
  - Metro: 1,978 km^{2} (764 sq mi)
- Elevation: 237 m (778 ft)
- Highest elevation: 497 m (1,631 ft)
- Lowest elevation: 190 m (620 ft)

Population (2026-01-01)
  - Statutory city: 404,296
  - Density: 1,791.2/km^{2} (4,639.2/sq mi)
  - Metro: 729,405
- Time zone: UTC+1 (CET)
  - Summer (DST): UTC+2 (CEST)
- Postal code: 600 00 – 650 00
- Website: www.brno.cz

Brno (/ˈbɜːrnoʊ/ BUR-noh, Czech pronunciation: [ˈbr̩no]; German: Brünn [bʁʏn]) is a city in the South Moravian Region of the Czech Republic. Located at the confluence of the Svitava and Svratka rivers, Brno has about 404,000 inhabitants, making it the second-largest city in the Czech Republic after the capital, Prague, and one of the 100 largest cities in the European Union. The Brno metropolitan area has approximately 730,000 inhabitants.

Brno served as the capital of Moravia from the Middle Ages until 1948, and remains the political and cultural hub of the South Moravian Region. Brno is an important centre of the Czech judiciary. The Constitutional Court, the Supreme Court, the Supreme Administrative Court, the Supreme Public Prosecutor's Office, as well as state authorities, such as the Ombudsman and the Office for the Protection of Competition, are all located here. Brno is also an important centre of learning and higher education, with 10 universities, 29 faculties and a student population of over 65,000, as well as more than 60 secondary schools throughout the city.

The Brno Exhibition Centre is one of the largest in Europe. The complex opened in 1928 and has a long history of hosting international trade fairs and expositions. The Masaryk Circuit has been hosting motorsport events since 1930, including the Road Racing World Championship Grand Prix. Another local tradition is the international fireworks competition and drone show Ignis Brunensis, which attracts over a million visitors annually.

Brno's traditional symbols are two medieval landmarks which dominate the cityscape: the historic Špilberk Castle and its fortifications, and the Cathedral of Saints Peter and Paul on Petrov hill. Another historic landmark is the Veveří Castle near the Brno Reservoir. The Villa Tugendhat, a seminal example of functionalist architecture, was added to the UNESCO World Heritage Sites List in 2001. One of the natural sights outside the city is the Moravian Karst. Brno is a member of the UNESCO Creative Cities Network and was designated a "City of Music" in 2017.

== Administrative division ==
Brno consists of 29 self-governing districts and 48 municipal parts, whose borders mostly respect the boundaries of the districts. The districts of Brno are:

- Brno-Bohunice
- Brno-Bosonohy
- Brno-Bystrc
- Brno-Černovice
- Brno-Chrlice
- Brno-Ivanovice
- Brno-Jehnice
- Brno-jih
- Brno-Jundrov
- Brno-Kníničky
- Brno-Kohoutovice
- Brno-Komín
- Brno-Královo Pole
- Brno-Líšeň
- Brno-Maloměřice and Obřany
- Brno-Medlánky
- Brno-Nový Lískovec
- Brno-Ořešín
- Brno-Řečkovice a Mokrá Hora
- Brno-sever
- Brno-Slatina
- Brno-střed
- Brno-Starý Lískovec
- Brno-Tuřany
- Brno-Útěchov
- Brno-Vinohrady
- Brno-Žabovřesky
- Brno-Žebětín
- Brno-Židenice

== Names ==
The etymology of the name Brno is disputed. It might be derived from Old Czech brnie, i.e. 'muddy', 'swampy'. Alternatives are the Slavic verb brniti ('to armour' or 'to fortify') or a Celtic origin. The latter theory would make it cognate with other Celtic words for hill, such as the Welsh word bryn. Throughout its history, locals in Brno have also referred to their city in different languages, including Brünn in German, ברין (Brin) in Yiddish, and Bruna in Latin. The town was also referred to as Brunn (/brʌn/) in English, but this variant is no longer common today. The asteroid 2889 Brno was named after the city, as was the Bren light machine gun. The latter was in wide use during World War II, and its name derives from 'Brno' and 'Enfield', the site of the Royal Small Arms Factory.

== History ==
=== Early history ===
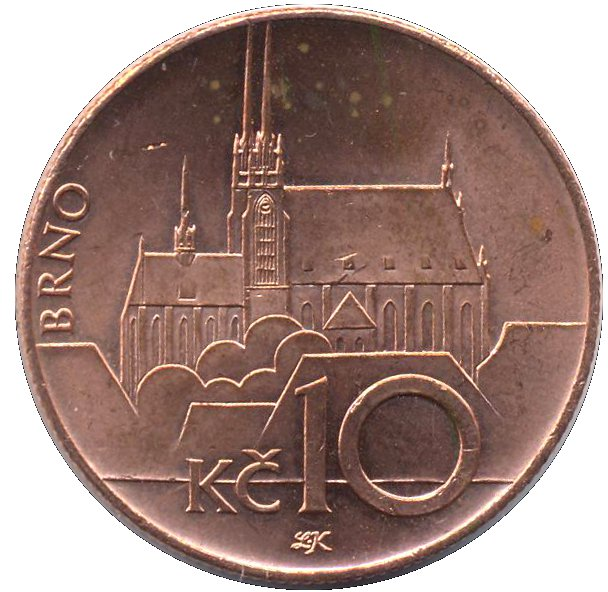
The 10 CZK coin (1993 design)

The Brno Basin has been inhabited since prehistoric times, as evidenced by a 2024 discovery of mammoth bones and prehistoric tools dating back 15,000 years. This aligns with the region's rich Paleolithic history, which includes nearby sites Dolní Věstonice and Švédův stůl with traces of Neanderthal activity.

The city's direct precursor was Staré Zámky, a fortified Great Moravian hillfort near Brno-Líšeň inhabited from the Neolithic Age until the early 11th century. Serving as a strategic hub connecting the empire's center with regional ironworks, the settlement was destroyed by a catastrophic fire around the turn of the 10th century and its remnants are now a protected monument.

=== Middle Ages ===
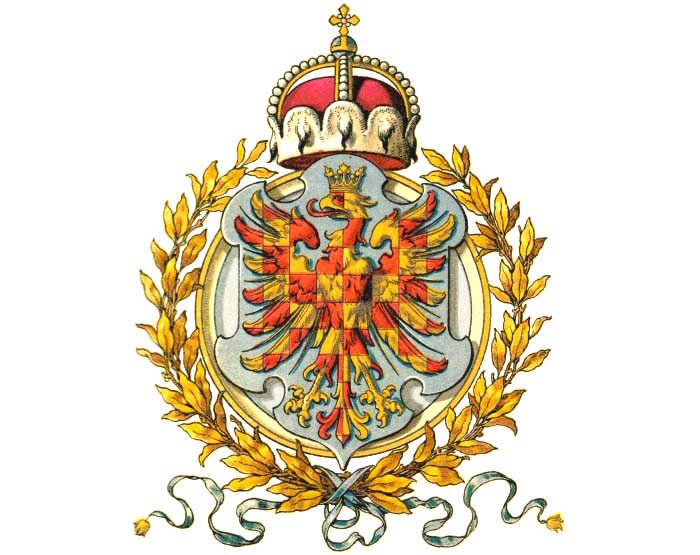
Coat of arms of the margraviate

In the early 11th century, Brno was established as the seat of a non-ruling prince from the House of Přemyslid, and it became one of the centres of Moravia, along with Olomouc and Znojmo. Brno was first mentioned in Cosmas' Chronica Boemorum, dating to 1091, when King Vratislaus II besieged his brother, Conrad, at Brno castle. In the mid-11th century, Moravia was divided into three separate territories. Each had its own ruler, who came from the Přemyslids dynasty but was independent of the other two, and subordinate to the Bohemian ruler in Prague. The seats of these rulers and thus the "capitals" of these three territories were the castles and towns of Brno, Olomouc, and Znojmo. In the late 12th century, Moravia began to reunify, forming the Margraviate of Moravia. From then until the middle of the 17th century, political power was divided between Brno and Olomouc, with Znojmo playing a tertiary role. Olomouc had a larger population than Brno and was also the seat of the Diocese of Olomouc, the sole bishopric in Moravia until 1777. The Moravian Diet, the Moravian Land Tables, and the Moravian Land Court convened in both cities. These assemblies made political, legal, and financial decisions.

Before the 13th century, there were virtually no Germans living in the Czech lands. Bohemia and Moravia-Silesia were inhabited by an essentially all-Slavic population. In 1243, the separate settlements that made up Brno were consolidated into a single fortified settlement and granted a royal city charter by King Wenceslaus I of Bohemia. As was common throughout Central and Eastern Europe at the time, the royal city charter was closely tied to the arrival of German settlers and other migrants.

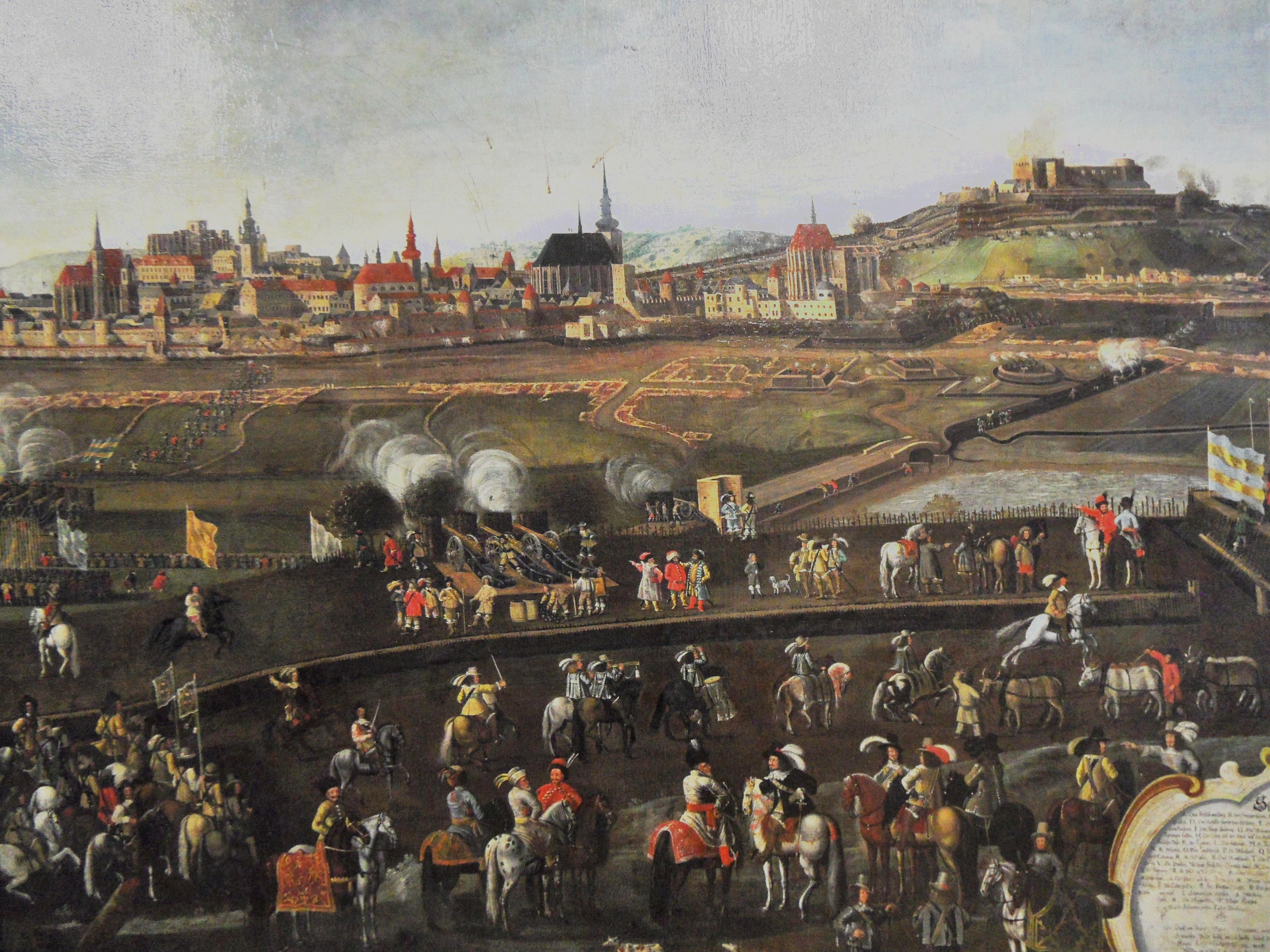
Unsuccessful Swedish siege in 1645

Around the turn of the 13th century, merchants on the main market, now known as Zelný trh, one of Brno's oldest squares, began building cellars to store food, wine, and beer. Although these vaults initially supported only local commerce, they became a vital part of the city's infrastructure and served as temporary shelters in wartime. They expanded over time, particularly in the Baroque period, and are now known as Labyrinth Under the Vegetable Market (Czech: Labyrint pod Zelným trhem). In 1324, Queen Elisabeth Richeza of Poland built the Basilica of the Assumption of Our Lady, where she is now buried, along with a Cistercian convent, which later became an Augustinian Abbey.

From the mid-14th century to the early 15th century, during the rule of the Moravian branch of the Luxembourg dynasty, Špilberk Castle served as the official seat of the Moravian margraves. One of them, Jobst of Moravia, was elected the King of the Romans. The Margraviate of Moravia was reunited under the Bohemian crown after his death. During the Hussite Wars, Brno was besieged by the Hussites twice, in 1428 and in 1430. Both attempts to conquer the city were unsuccessful.

=== 17th and 18th centuries ===
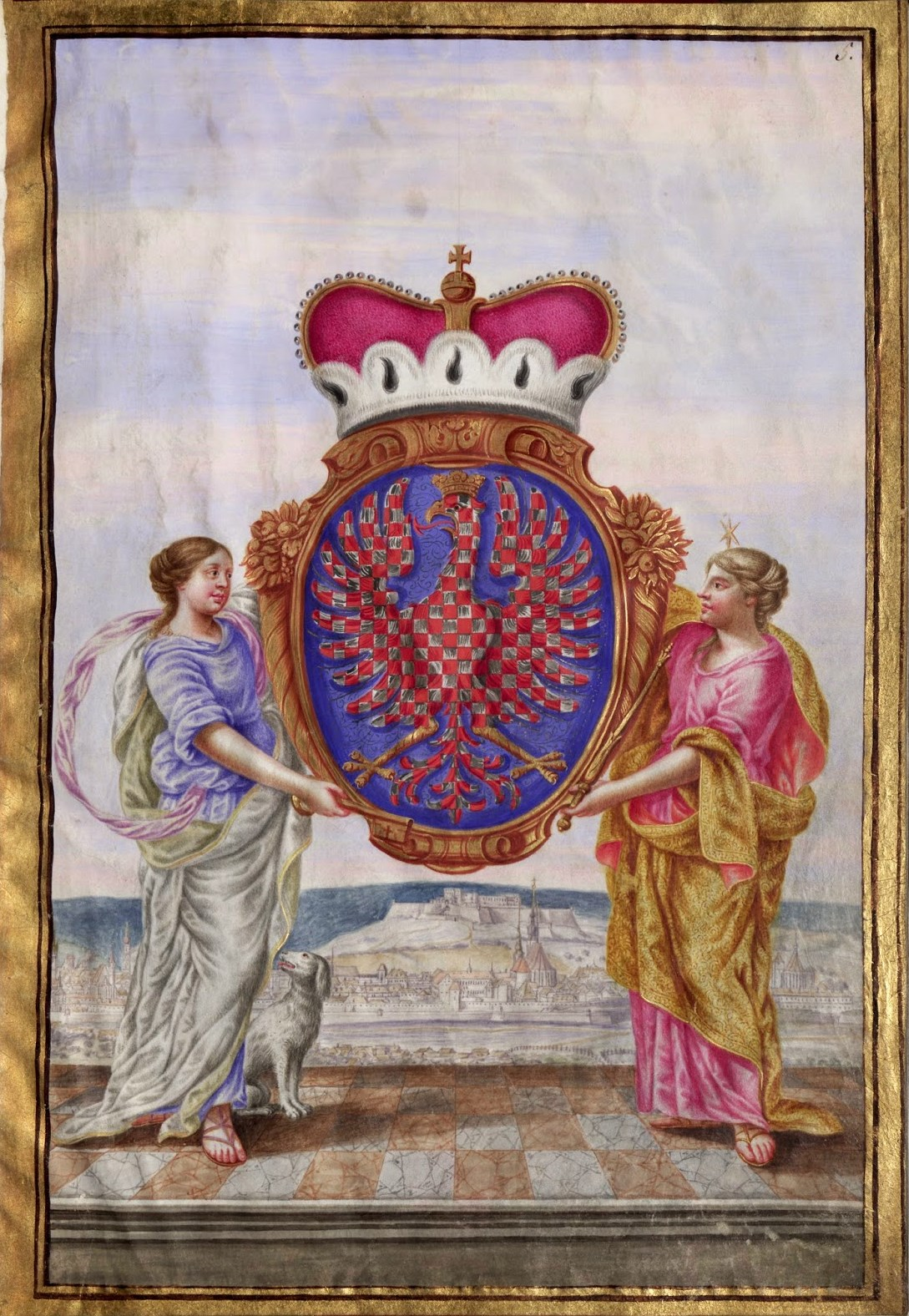
Coat of arms of the Margraviate of Moravia in Book of the state of lords with the picture of Brno (1670)

In 1641, during the Thirty Years' War, the Holy Roman Emperor and the margrave of Moravia, Ferdinand III, ordered the permanent relocation of the Diet, the Land Court, and the Land Tables from Olomouc to Brno, as Collegium Nordicum had made Olomouc the primary target of the Swedish armies. In 1642, Olomouc surrendered to the Swedish Army, which occupied it for eight years. (Note: This led to a decline in the population of Olomouc from over 30,000 people to just 1,675, and total devastation of the city.) Brno, under the leadership of Jean-Louis Raduit de Souches, successfully resisted the siege of Brno in 1645, the only Moravian city that succeeded in defending itself from the Swedes, who were commanded by Field Marshal Lennart Torstensson. Brno subsequently served as the sole capital of the Margraviate of Moravia.

After the conclusion of the Thirty Years' War in 1648, Brno retained its status as the sole capital of the region. That was later confirmed by the Holy Roman Emperor Joseph II in 1782, and again in 1849 by the Moravian constitution. Today, the Moravian Land Tables are stored in the Moravian Regional Archive and are designated as a national cultural heritage site of the Czech Republic. During the 17th century, Špilberk Castle was rebuilt as a massive baroque citadel. Brno was besieged by the Prussian Army led by Frederick the Great during the War of the Austrian Succession in 1742, but the siege was ultimately unsuccessful. In 1777, the bishopric of Brno was established by Pope Pius VI, with Mathias Franz Graf von Chorinsky Freiherr von Ledske as its first bishop. (Note: The cathedral of the bishopric of the Diocese of Brno, the Cathedral of St. Peter and Paul, is depicted on the 10CZK coin.)

During the 18th century, Brno experienced a significant textile industry boom, resulting in the rapid expansion of its suburbs and earning it the nickname "Moravian Manchester". Brno flourished economically through the end of the 19th century. The city infrastructure, including sewer and water supply systems, was improved, and the fortifications around Špilberk Castle were reinforced. Rapid industrialisation brought about poor housing and working conditions for factory workers. Child labour, tuberculosis, inhumanely long shifts, and unequal relations between employees and employers were commonplace.

=== 19th century ===
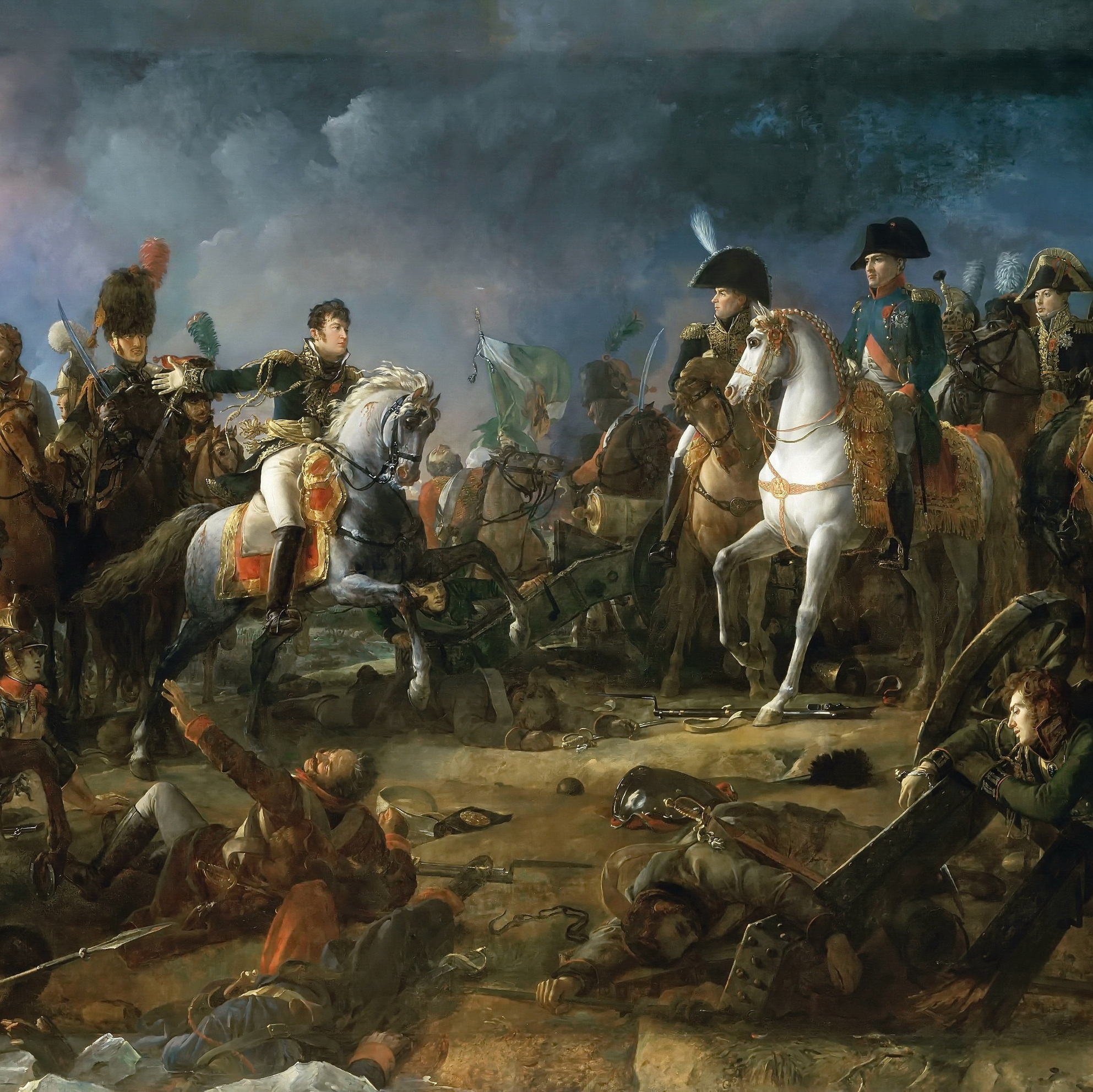
Battle of Austerlitz, 2 December 1805

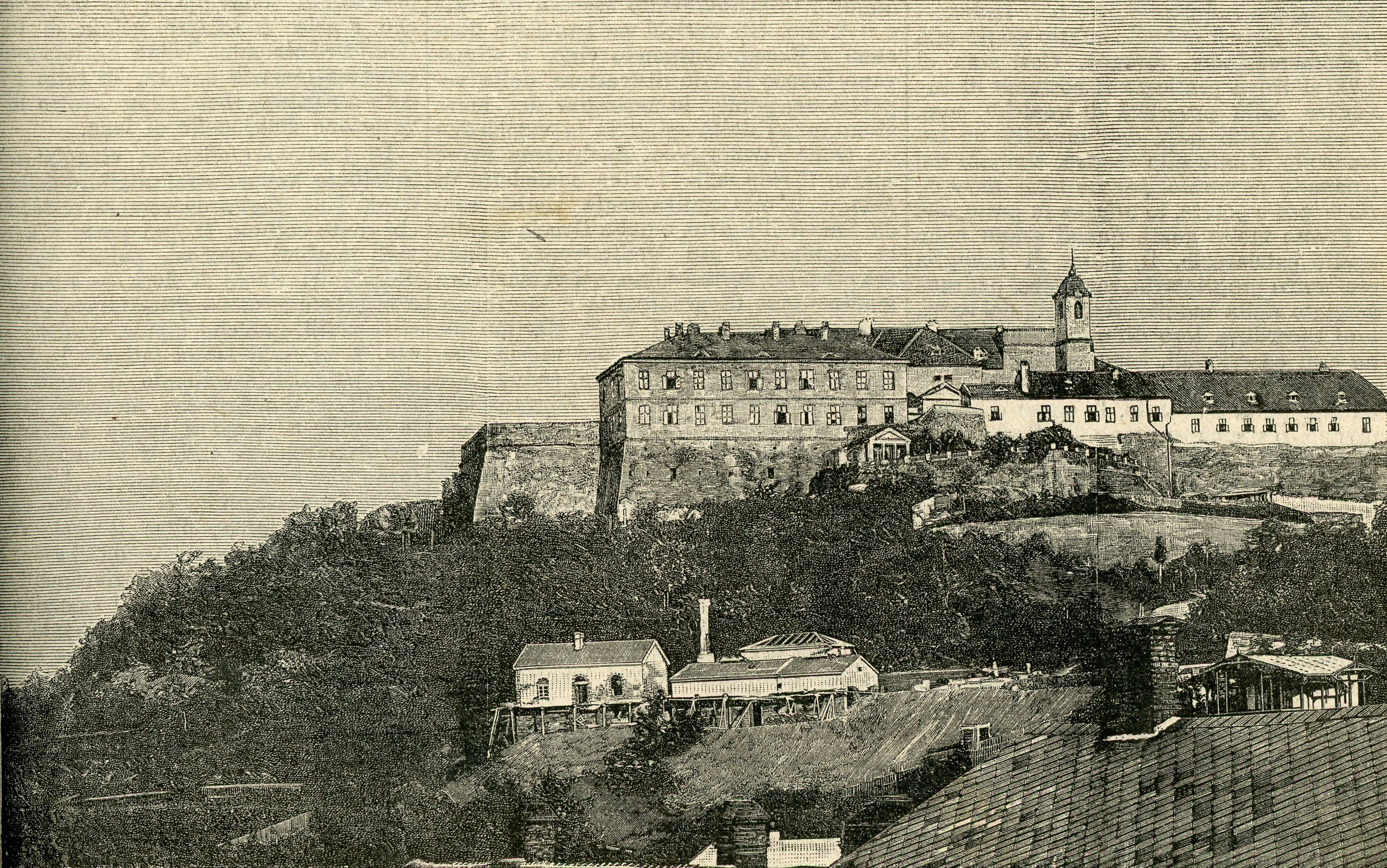
Špilberk Castle c. 1897

In December 1805, the Battle of Austerlitz was fought near the city; the battle is also known as the "Battle of the Three Emperors". Although Brno itself was not directly involved in the battle, the city was under French occupation, which conferred significant hardship on the local population. In the wake of the hostilities, there was a devastating typhoid fever outbreak due to the mild winter temperatures that year. The French Emperor Napoleon Bonaparte stayed in Brno from 20 November to 12 December 1805. The French returned in 1809 and occupied the city for four months after the Battle of Znaim. Napoleon ordered the fortification around Špilberk Castle dismantled and leveled, and the Castle lost its military significance as a fortress. These events are the theme of re-enactments that attract an international audience every year.

In 1839, the first train arrived in Brno from Vienna via the Emperor Ferdinand Northern Railway. That marked the beginning of rail transport in the Czech Republic and Austria. Between 1859 and 1864, city fortifications were almost completely removed. In 1869, a horsecar service began operating in Brno, marking it the first tram service in what would later become the Czech Republic. Gregor Mendel, an Augustinian monk and geneticist, conducted groundbreaking genetics experiments with pea plants at St. Thomas's Abbey in Brno during the 1850s. The monastery served as a local hub for education, culture, and the arts, with a well-stocked library and other amenities. Mendel's work was not recognized during his lifetime, and he abandoned it after he was elected abbot of the monastery in 1868. Brno is home to Mendel University, which has been located there since the mid-1990s, when the former University of Agriculture, the nation's oldest agricultural school, was renamed in his honour.

Tomáš Masaryk, the first president and founding father of Czechoslovakia, attended a German-language grammar school (German: Deutsches Ober-Gymnasium) in Brno between 1865 and 1869. His school served as a military hospital during the Austro-Prussian War of 1866, which led to the creation of the dual monarchy of Austria-Hungary. Although no major conflict took place in Brno during the war, the Prussian Army occupied the city following the Battle of Königgrätz. Several days later, a cholera epidemic that claimed the lives of more than 1,400 residents broke out. Masaryk later became a proponent of a second Czech university, alongside Charles University, which was established in Brno in 1919 and named after him. The Masaryk Circuit and Masarykova Street, connecting Liberty Square and the train station, are also named in his honour.

Leoš Janáček, ranked among most-performed opera composers in the world, accepted a chorister scholarship at St. Thomas's Abbey in 1865. He would spend the rest of his life in Brno, except for the period between 1872 and 1881 when he pursued advanced musical studies in Prague, Vienna, and Leipzig. He founded the Brno Organ School, which is now part of the Janáček Academy of Music and Performing Arts (JAMU), upon his return in 1881. Janáček had a profound impact on Brno and its cultural life. His legacy helped transform the city into a major cultural hub. Owing to his significance to Brno's history, several places and institutions have been named in his honour. In addition to JAMU, there is also the Janáček Theatre, an opera house and the largest of the three theatres belonging to the National Theatre Brno.

=== 20th century and Greater Brno ===
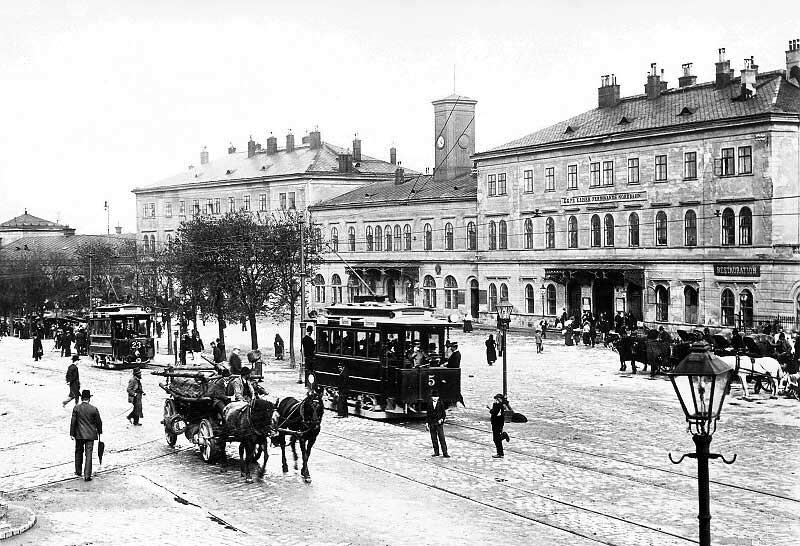
Main railway station in 1901

At the start of the 20th century, roughly two-thirds of Brno's residents spoke German, but its suburbs and neighbouring towns were predominantly Czech-speaking. Everyday life in the city was bilingual. The local German dialect, known as Brünnerisch, incorporated elements from both languages. The end of World War I brought about the partition of Austria-Hungary, and more than three million Germans found themselves separated from Austria and under Czech control. After the Czechoslovak Republic was proclaimed on 28 October 1918, the Sudeten Germans asserted their right to self-determination and peacefully opposed the Czech military taking control of their homeland. Fighting broke out sporadically, resulting in casualties. Moravia contained patches of "landlocked" German territory to the north and south. German-language islands and towns inhabited by German-speaking populations, surrounded by Czech speakers, were common, just as in Brno.

Linguistic map of Czechoslovakia in 1930

Until 1918, the city of Brno was significantly smaller, and in administrative terms, it consisted only of the city centre. In 1919, two neighboring towns, Královo Pole and Husovice, along with 21 other surrounding municipalities, were annexed by Brno, creating Greater Brno (Czech: Velké Brno) in an effort to dilute the German-speaking population majority, which comprised approximately 55,000 residents, by adding Czech speakers from the city's vicinity. A significant portion of the German-speaking population was Jewish, comprising nearly 12,000 individuals, including several of the city's better-known personalities, who made a substantial contribution to the city's cultural life. Greater Brno was almost seven times larger in area, with a population of about 222,000 – before that, Brno proper had about 130,000 inhabitants.

The size of Brno's German population was virtually unchanged in the 1930 census, the last census before the war, when 200,000 residents declared Czech nationality, and approximately 52,000 identified as German. Both groups included Jewish citizens. Although Czechoslovakia experienced a peaceful and prosperous decade during the 1920s, ethnic tensions escalated in the 1930s following the onset of the Great Depression. Hitler's rise to power further inflamed the situation — particularly when the Sudeten German Party became the second-largest party in Czechoslovakia, and it became known that the party received financial support from Berlin. During the interwar period, Brno served as the capital of the administrative region of Moravia (Czech: Země Moravská) from 1921 to 1928, and as the capital of Moravia-Silesia (Czech: Země Moravskoslezská) from 1928 to 1948. The city emerged as the preeminent site of modernist architecture during this period.

=== World War II ===
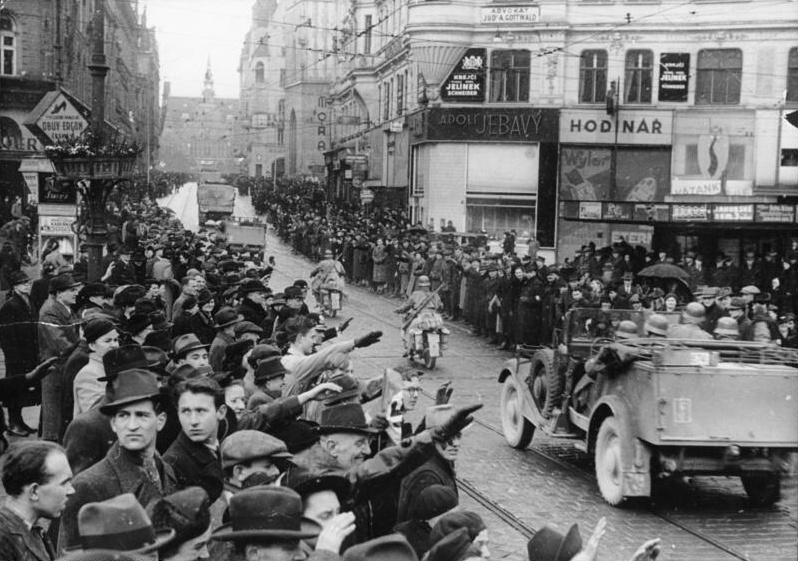
Part of the civilian population welcomes German troops with the Nazi salute in Brno, 16 March 1939.

During the German occupation of the Czech lands between 1939 and 1945, all Czech universities were closed by the Nazis, including those in Brno. The Faculty of Law became the local headquarters of the Gestapo, and the Nazis used the Kounic Residence Hall at Masaryk University as a political prison for anti-fascists. Along with the firing range in Kobylisy, the Kounic dormitories were the most frequently used execution grounds in the Protectorate. About 35,000 Czechs and some American and British POWs were imprisoned and tortured there; about 800 civilians were executed or died. The executions were public. The Nazis also operated a subcamp of the Auschwitz concentration camp, which mainly held Polish prisoners, an internment camp for Romani people in the city, and a forced labour "re-education" camp in the present-day district of Dvorska.

Between 1941 and 1942, transports from Brno deported 10,081 Jews to the Theresienstadt (Terezín) concentration camp. At least another 960 people, mostly of mixed ancestry, followed in 1943 and 1944. From Terezín, many of them were sent to the Auschwitz concentration camp, the Minsk Ghetto, Rejowiec, and other ghettos and concentration camps. Although Terezín was not an extermination camp, 995 deportees from Brno perished there. Only 1,033 people out of over 11,000 returned after the war. In 1944 and 1945, the city centre and several industrial facilities, such as the Československá zbrojovka small arms factory and the Flugmotorenwerke Zweigwerk aircraft engine factory, were targeted by Allied bombing raids.

Air strikes and artillery fire killed some 1,200 people and destroyed 1,278 buildings. More than 12,000 buildings, or about half of the city's building stock, were damaged. In the wake of the occupation by the Red Army on 26 April 1945 and the end of the war, President Edvard Beneš arrived in Brno and delivered a speech demanding the expulsion of Germans. Subsequently, beginning on 31 May 1945, remaining German inhabitants, comprising over 20,000 individuals, were marched 64 kilometres (40 miles) to the Austrian border. According to testimony collected by German sources, about 5,200 of them died during the march. Later Czech estimates put the death toll at about 1,700, with most of the fatalities attributed to an epidemic of shigellosis. In 2015, seventy years after the end of World War II, the city council issued a formal apology and expressed regret about the expulsion of German residents. The event is commemorated every year.

=== Communist Era and post-1989 transformation ===
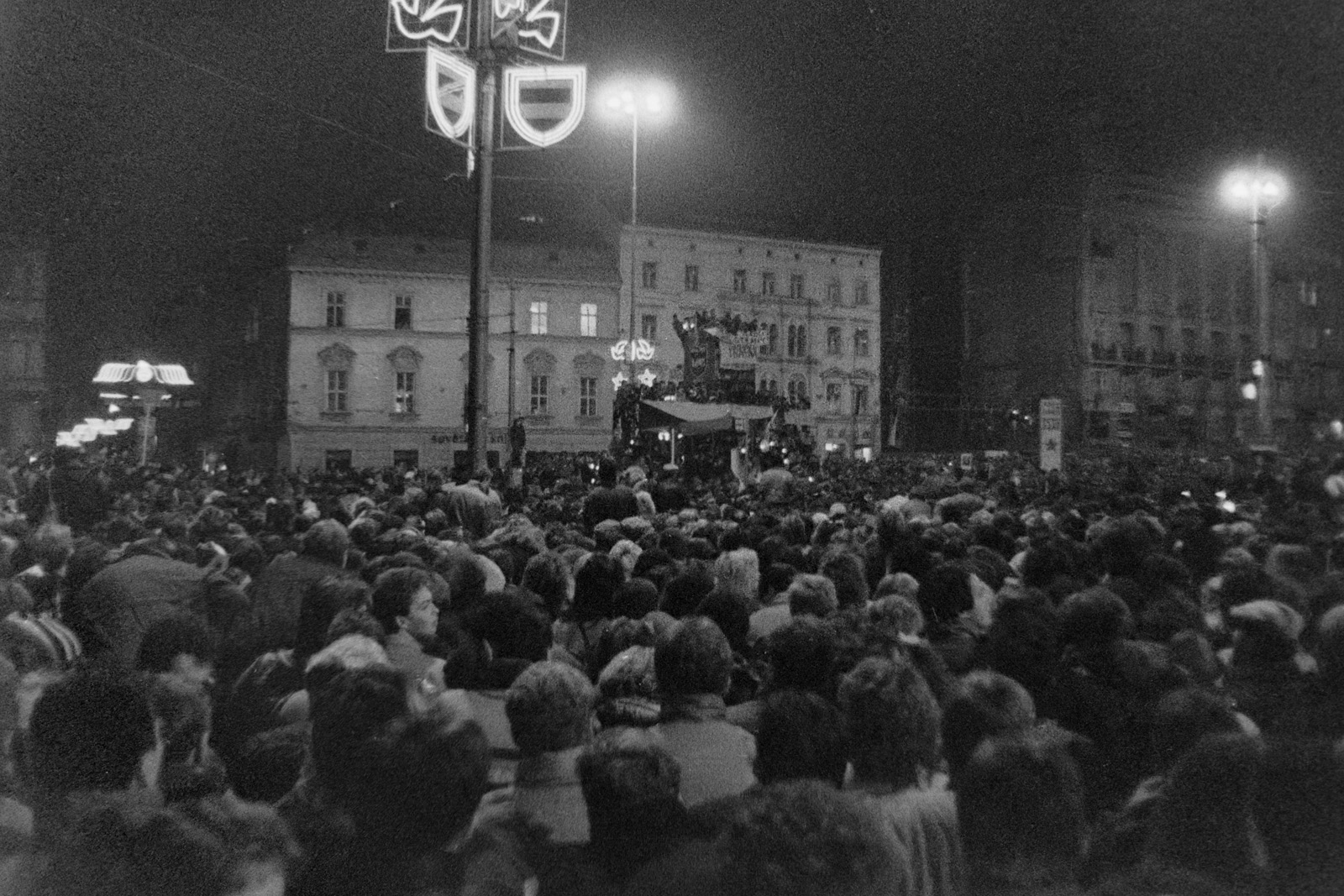
Demonstration at Náměstí Svobody, 20 November 1989

Shortly after the communist coup d'état in 1948, the new regime abolished the traditional system of regional governance in an effort to centralise power in Prague, effectively ending Brno's role as the capital of Moravia. Moravia was divided into administrative districts, with Brno becoming the administrative centre of what is now the South Moravian Region. Throughout the Communist Era, Brno's economy relied on heavy manufacturing and machine-building. Large prefab concrete housing estates (paneláks) were constructed during the 1960s and 1970s in Bohunice, Líšeň, Bystrc, and Vinohrady. Many historic buildings fell into disrepair or were demolished as part of urban redevelopment.

Following the Velvet Revolution of 1989, Brno's economy underwent a substantial transformation. Its workforce transitioned from heavy manufacturing to services and light industry, and Brno emerged as an information technology and research hub of the Czech Republic. New industrial parks, such as CTPark Brno in Černovická terasa, were developed on the city's outskirts. Today, the wider Brno region is a global centre for electron microscopy and cybersecurity development. The city has also experienced a considerable cultural renaissance and historical renewal.

== Geography ==
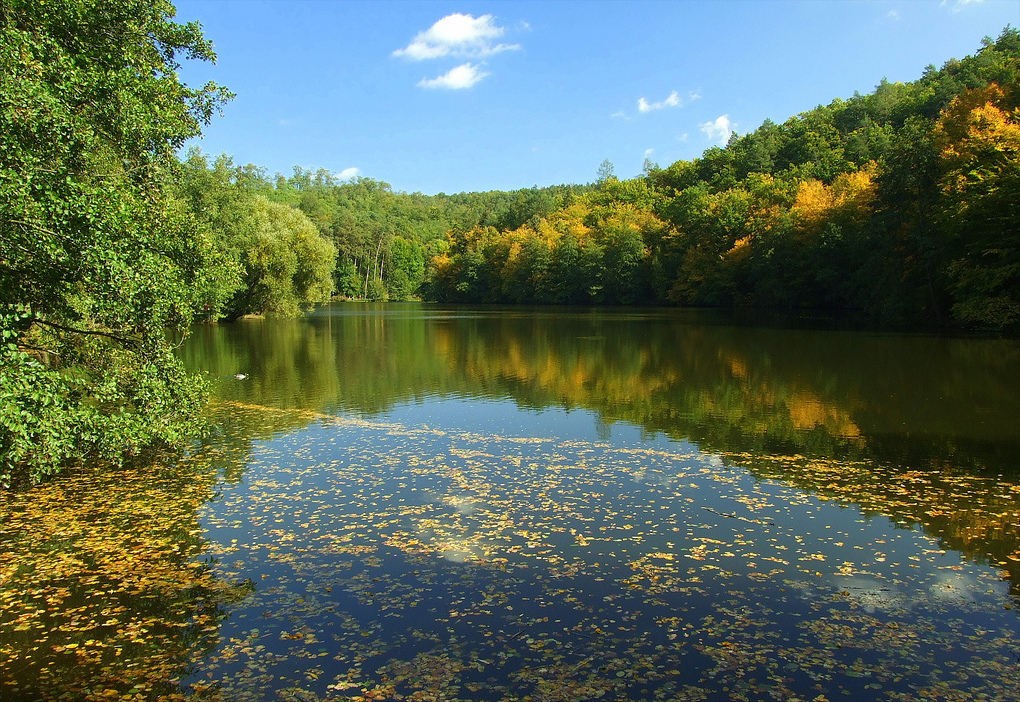
Mariánské údolí in Líšeň

Brno is situated at the confluence of the Svitava and Svratka rivers, located between the Bohemian-Moravian Highlands and the Dyje–Svratka Valley in the southeastern part of the Czech Republic. The city is at the crossroads of ancient trade routes, which have linked northern and southern Europe since time immemorial. Brno is historically closely connected with Vienna, which lies 110 km (68 mi) to the south. The city is 21.5 km (13.4 mi) in diameter east to west with a total area of 230 km^{2} (89 sq mi). Wooded hills surround Brno on three sides. About 28% of the city area, or 6,379 ha (15,763 acres), is forested.

The city is relatively low-lying, with elevations ranging between 190 m (623 ft) and 497 m (1,631 ft). The highest peak within the municipal area is Kopeček Hill, at 479 m (1,572 ft), and the highest elevation overall is Útěchov, located on the border with Vranov. Brno is located within the Danube basin. The length of the Svratka River waterway through the city is about 29 km (18 mi), and the Svitava River's waterway is about 13 km (8 mi). Several smaller streams flow through Brno, including the Veverka Stream, the Ponávka, and the Říčka. Of note is the Brno Reservoir, as well as numerous ponds, and other standing bodies of water, such as the reservoirs in the valley Mariánské údolí and the fishpond Žebětínský rybník.

=== Climate ===
Brno has a moderate climate and moderate air quality. No severe weather events or disasters have been recorded. Under the Köppen climate classification, Brno has an oceanic climate (Cfb) for −3 °C original isoterm, but near the −2.5 °C average temperature in January, the coldest month. It is classified as a humid continental climate (Dfb) in the updated classification, characterized by cold winters and warm to hot summers. A warming trend has been observed over the past two decades, and summer days with temperatures above 30 °C (86 °F) are relatively common. The average temperature is 9.4 °C (49 °F), and the average annual precipitation is approximately 505 mm (19.88 in) with an average of 150 rainy days. Average annual sunshine hours are 1,771 hours, and the prevailing wind direction is northwest. Weather data from 1961 to 1990 is tabulated in the weather box below.

Climate data for Brno-Tuřany Airport, Brno Coordinates 49°09′11″N 16°41′20″E; elevation: 241 m (791 ft); WMO ID: 11723; 1991–2020 normals, extremes 1959–present
Month	Jan	Feb	Mar	Apr	May	Jun	Jul	Aug	Sep	Oct	Nov	Dec	Year
Record high °C (°F)	15.8 (60.4)	17.7 (63.9)	24.3 (75.7)	29.5 (85.1)	31.8 (89.2)	38.1 (100.6)	36.4 (97.5)	38.9 (102.0)	32.0 (89.6)	27.7 (81.9)	20.1 (68.2)	14.4 (57.9)	38.9 (102.0)
Mean daily maximum °C (°F)	1.9 (35.4)	4.5 (40.1)	9.7 (49.5)	16.1 (61.0)	20.4 (68.7)	24.1 (75.4)	26.5 (79.7)	26.4 (79.5)	20.5 (68.9)	14.1 (57.4)	7.7 (45.9)	2.6 (36.7)	14.5 (58.1)
Daily mean °C (°F)	−0.8 (30.6)	0.9 (33.6)	4.9 (40.8)	10.8 (51.4)	15.2 (59.4)	18.9 (66.0)	20.7 (69.3)	20.5 (68.9)	15.3 (59.5)	9.8 (49.6)	4.8 (40.6)	0.2 (32.4)	10.1 (50.2)
Mean daily minimum °C (°F)	−3.5 (25.7)	−2.5 (27.5)	0.8 (33.4)	5.2 (41.4)	9.6 (49.3)	13.2 (55.8)	14.9 (58.8)	14.8 (58.6)	10.6 (51.1)	6.1 (43.0)	2.0 (35.6)	−2.3 (27.9)	5.7 (42.3)
Record low °C (°F)	−24.1 (−11.4)	−22.2 (−8.0)	−18.6 (−1.5)	−6.3 (20.7)	−2.6 (27.3)	1.8 (35.2)	3.6 (38.5)	3.0 (37.4)	−0.7 (30.7)	−6.5 (20.3)	−13.1 (8.4)	−20.9 (−5.6)	−24.1 (−11.4)
Average precipitation mm (inches)	23.4 (0.92)	22.3 (0.88)	30.0 (1.18)	27.3 (1.07)	59.1 (2.33)	69.5 (2.74)	71.5 (2.81)	60.7 (2.39)	51.4 (2.02)	35.1 (1.38)	32.2 (1.27)	30.0 (1.18)	512.3 (20.17)
Average snowfall cm (inches)	11.5 (4.5)	8.6 (3.4)	3.8 (1.5)	0.5 (0.2)	0.0 (0.0)	0.0 (0.0)	0.0 (0.0)	0.0 (0.0)	0.0 (0.0)	0.0 (0.0)	3.0 (1.2)	8.9 (3.5)	36.3 (14.3)
Average precipitation days (≥ 1.0mm)	6.0	5.2	6.1	5.8	8.6	8.4	9.6	7.4	6.2	6.5	6.7	7.0	83.4
Average relative humidity (%)	83.5	77.7	70.5	62.4	65.1	65.4	63.8	64.2	71.5	79.2	84.6	85.7	72.8
Average dew point °C (°F)	−4.8 (23.4)	−3.3 (26.1)	−0.2 (31.6)	3.9 (39.0)	8.3 (46.9)	11.3 (52.3)	12.7 (54.9)	12.6 (54.7)	9.5 (49.1)	5.0 (41.0)	0.9 (33.6)	−3.0 (26.6)	4.4 (39.9)
Mean monthly sunshine hours	54.7	85.0	139.5	203.0	234.9	245.2	257.7	250.3	174.1	111.7	55.4	43.3	1,854.8
Percentage possible sunshine	18.32	27.16	35.30	45.00	47.49	48.27	50.40	52.32	44.45	35.50	19.32	16.15	36.64
Average ultraviolet index	1	1	3	4	6	7	7	6	4	2	1	1	4
Source 1: NOAA (dew point 1961–1990)
Source 2: Český hydrometeorologický ústav (ČHMU)

Climate data for Brno (Brno-Žabovřesky), 1991–2020 normals, extremes 1987–present
Month	Jan	Feb	Mar	Apr	May	Jun	Jul	Aug	Sep	Oct	Nov	Dec	Year
Record high °C (°F)	16.4 (61.5)	18.4 (65.1)	23.2 (73.8)	30.0 (86.0)	33.6 (92.5)	38.9 (102.0)	37.9 (100.2)	38.8 (101.8)	32.9 (91.2)	27.8 (82.0)	19.2 (66.6)	14.4 (57.9)	38.9 (102.0)
Mean daily maximum °C (°F)	2.3 (36.1)	4.9 (40.8)	10.0 (50.0)	16.9 (62.4)	21.6 (70.9)	25.4 (77.7)	27.5 (81.5)	27.2 (81.0)	21.0 (69.8)	14.2 (57.6)	7.9 (46.2)	2.9 (37.2)	15.1 (59.2)
Daily mean °C (°F)	−0.4 (31.3)	1.1 (34.0)	5.1 (41.2)	10.9 (51.6)	15.6 (60.1)	19.4 (66.9)	21.0 (69.8)	20.5 (68.9)	15.1 (59.2)	9.7 (49.5)	5.0 (41.0)	0.5 (32.9)	10.3 (50.5)
Mean daily minimum °C (°F)	−3.2 (26.2)	−2.4 (27.7)	0.7 (33.3)	4.9 (40.8)	9.5 (49.1)	13.2 (55.8)	14.9 (58.8)	14.6 (58.3)	10.4 (50.7)	6.0 (42.8)	2.3 (36.1)	−1.9 (28.6)	5.8 (42.4)
Record low °C (°F)	−23.6 (−10.5)	−20.4 (−4.7)	−15.0 (5.0)	−6.0 (21.2)	−0.7 (30.7)	2.7 (36.9)	6.7 (44.1)	4.5 (40.1)	1.0 (33.8)	−6.4 (20.5)	−12.6 (9.3)	−22.1 (−7.8)	−23.6 (−10.5)
Average precipitation mm (inches)	25.9 (1.02)	23.1 (0.91)	32.9 (1.30)	29.0 (1.14)	55.7 (2.19)	67.9 (2.67)	72.1 (2.84)	62.1 (2.44)	53.5 (2.11)	35.6 (1.40)	33.5 (1.32)	30.7 (1.21)	522.0 (20.55)
Average snowfall cm (inches)	10.8 (4.3)	8.3 (3.3)	4.8 (1.9)	0.4 (0.2)	0.0 (0.0)	0.0 (0.0)	0.0 (0.0)	0.0 (0.0)	0.0 (0.0)	trace	3.1 (1.2)	8.6 (3.4)	36.1 (14.2)
Average relative humidity (%)	82.0	76.4	69.8	61.6	62.9	62.6	62.3	64.4	72.7	79.4	83.2	84.2	71.8
Mean monthly sunshine hours	47.6	75.7	145.8	209.9	204.0	221.1	244.6	242.7	175.7	106.0	54.8	42.0	1,769.8
Percentage possible sunshine	17.59	26.41	39.35	50.17	42.31	46.87	50.24	53.18	46.31	33.24	19.85	15.77	36.77
Average ultraviolet index	1	1	3	4	6	7	7	6	4	2	1	1	4
Source: Czech Hydrometeorological Institute

=== Cityscape ===
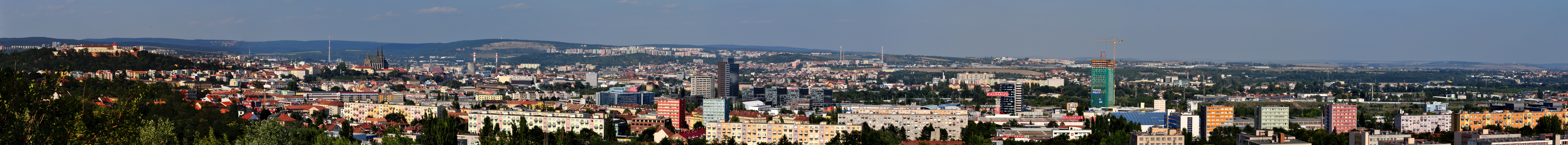
Panoramic view of approximately the northeast quarter of the city

== Administration ==
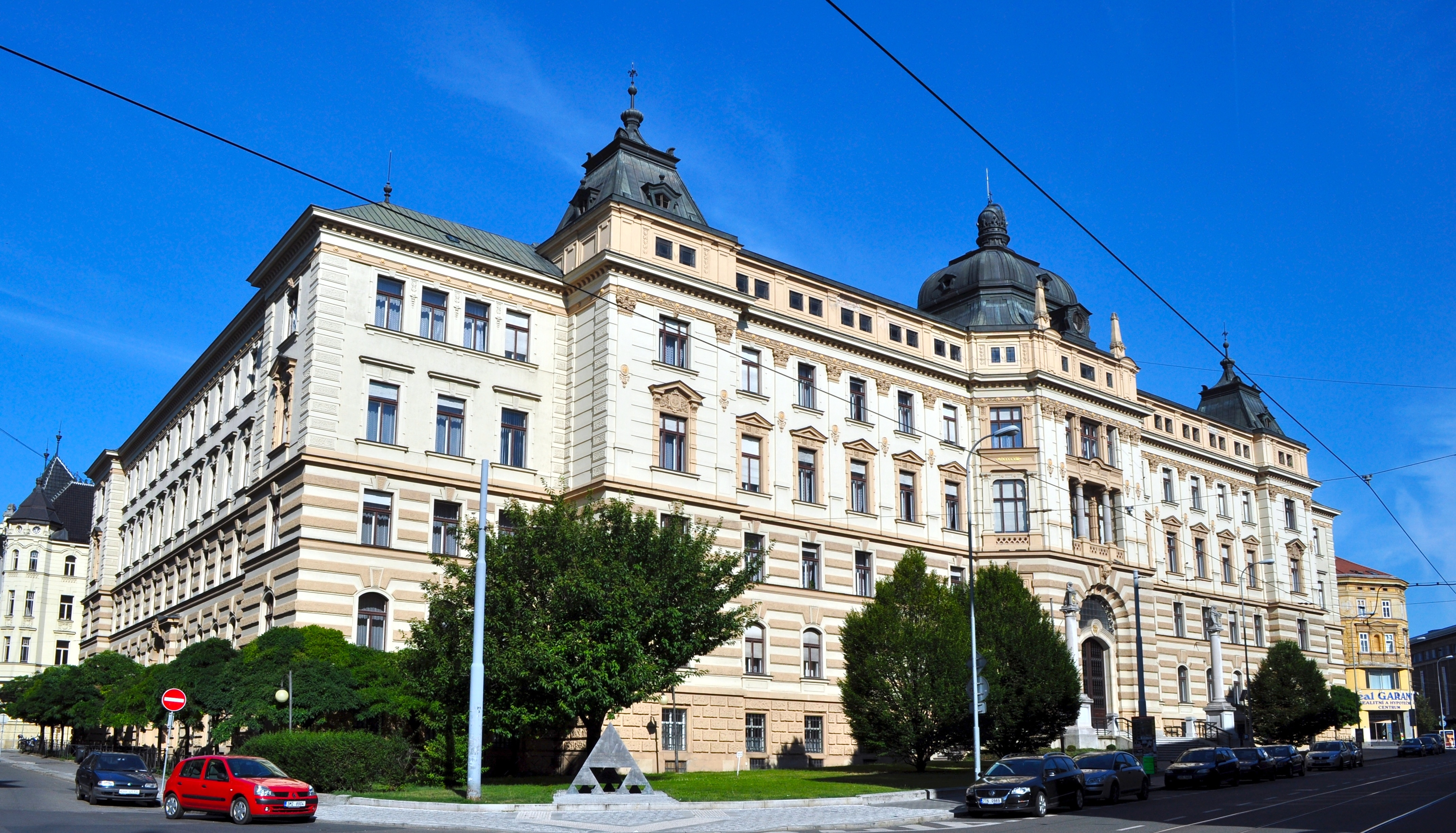
The Palace of Justice, seat of the regional court

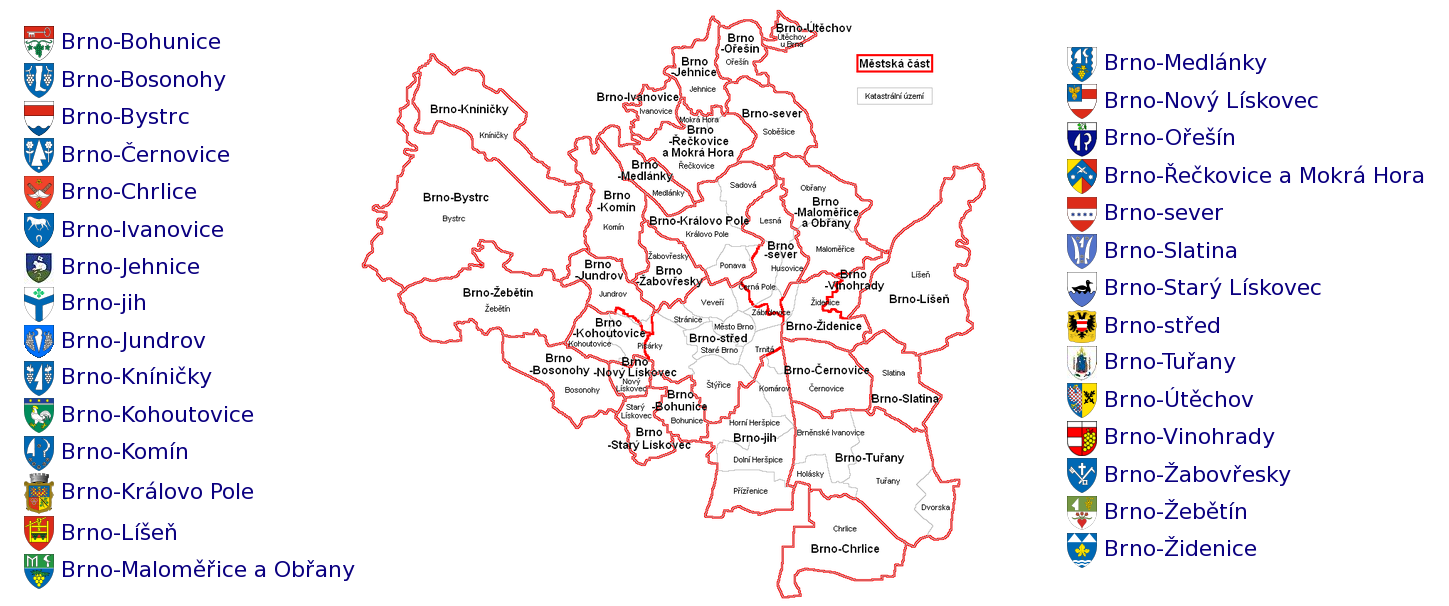
Administrative divisions of Brno and their coats of arms

Brno is a statutory city, consisting of 29 administrative divisions known as city districts. The highest body of self-government is the Brno City Assembly. The city is headed up by the mayor, who has the right to use the mayor's insignia and represents the city externally. In 2026, Jakub Hruška of KDU-ČSL became the mayor. The executive body is the city council and local councils of the city districts; the city council has 11 members, including the mayor and four deputies. The assembly of the city elects the mayor and other members of the city council, establishes the local police, and is also entitled to grant citizenship of honour and the Awards of the City of Brno.

The head of the Assembly of the City of Brno in personal matters is the Chief Executive, who, according to certain special regulations, carries out the function of employer of the other members of the city management. The Chief Executive is directly responsible to the mayor.

Brno proper forms a separate district, the Brno-City District, surrounded by the Brno-Country District. The city is divided into 29 administrative divisions (city districts) and consists of 48 cadastral areas. The "Brno-City District" and "Brno-Country District" are not to be confused with the "city districts" of Brno. The city districts of Brno vary widely by both population and area. The most populous city district of Brno is Brno-Centre, which has over 91,000 residents, and the least populous is Brno-Ořešín and Brno-Útěchov, with about 500 residents. By area, the largest district is Brno-Bystrc (27.24 square kilometres; 10.52 sq mi) and the smallest one is Brno-Nový Lískovec (1.66 square kilometres; 0.64 sq mi). Brno is the home to the highest courts of the Czech judiciary. The Supreme Court is on Burešova Street, the Supreme Administrative Court is on Moravské náměstí (English: Moravian Square), the Constitutional Court is on Joštova Street, and the Supreme Public Prosecutor's Office of the Czech Republic is on Jezuitská Street.

== Demographics ==
According to the 2021 census, Brno had a population of 398,510 inhabitants. The city experienced the most significant population growth in the 19th century during the Industrial Revolution and after World War I, when it annexed nearly two dozen surrounding municipalities to create Greater Brno.

Historical population

Year	Pop.	±%
1869	104,977	—
1880	120,122	+14.4%
1890	145,782	+21.4%
1900	176,645	+21.2%
1910	216,709	+22.7%

Year	Pop.	±%
1921	237,659	+9.7%
1930	283,972	+19.5%
1950	299,099	+5.3%
1961	324,173	+8.4%
1970	344,218	+6.2%

Year	Pop.	±%
1980	371,463	+7.9%
1991	388,296	+4.5%
2001	376,172	−3.1%
2011	385,913	+2.6%
2021	398,510	+3.3%

Source: Censuses

=== Ethnicity and nationality ===
The largest ethnic groups in the 2021 census were Czechs (44.60%), Moravians (14.08%), Slovaks (1.74%), Ukrainians (1.04%), Russians (0.36%), Vietnamese (0.35%), and Poles (0.10%). About 26% of respondents did not specify their nationality. In the 2001 census, with different reporting requirements, 76.1% identified as Czechs and 18.7% as Moravians. And in the 1991 census, 35.8% identified as Czechs and 60.9% as Moravians. The outcome of the 1980 census is included for historical completeness. Censuses conducted under communist rule in Czechoslovakia were heavily politicized, particularly concerning the registration of nationality and religion. Beyond manipulating the categories and responses, the communist regime also controlled the dissemination of the census data itself.

Population of Brno by ethnic group 1980–2021
Ethnic group	1980 Census		1991 Census		2001 Census		2011 Census		2021 Census	
Ethnic group	Popul.	%	Popul.	%	Popul.	%	Popul.	%	Popul.	%
Czech	360,481	97.04%	138,919	35.78%	286,120	76.06%	191,395	49.60%	177,729	44.60%
Moravian			236,550	60.92%	70,258	18.68%	72,367	18.75%	56,111	14.08%
Silesian			423	0.11%	95	0.03%	148	0.04%	182	0.05%
Slovak	6,806	1.83%	7,137	1.84%	5,795	1.54%	5,956	1.54%	6,937	1.74%
German	461	0.12%	464	0.12%	425	0.11%	203	0.05%	172	0.04%
Polish	327	0.09%	359	0.09%	402	0.11%	464	0.12%	445	0.11%
Roma			1,497	0.39%	374	0.10%	157	0.04%	191	0.05%
Russian	223	0.06%			365	0.10%	551	0.14%	1,433	0.36%
Ukrainian	225	0.06%	169	0.04%	710	0.19%	3,271	0.85%	4,129	1.04%
Vietnamese					721	0.19%	1,487	0.39%	1,376	0.35%
Not stated	1,210	0.33%			7,481	1.99%	91,529	23.72%	103,961	26.09%
Total	371,463		388,296		376,172		385,913		398,510	
Source: Censuses

=== Foreign nationals ===
As of August 2025, foreign nationals accounted for about 66,415, or about 16.7% of Brno's population. Out of that total, approximately 18,839 had permanent residency, and 47,576 had a temporary status. The following nationalities had the most significant presence:

Foreign nationals in Brno (August 2025)
Nationality	Population
Ukraine	33,049
Slovakia	10,111
Vietnam	2,993
Russia	1,905
India	1,274
Other countries/territories: Philippines / 902; Romania / 838; Kazakhstan / 684; United States / 645; Turkey / 628; Bulgaria / 613; Poland / 573; United Kingdom / 569; Hungary / 549; Italy / 483; Mainland China / 453; Serbia / 424; Belarus / 422; Bosnia and Herzegovina / 388; Bangladesh / 340; Moldova / 331; Greece / 328; Mongolia / 293; Germany / 290; Egypt / 289; Ghana / 265; Japan / 261; Taiwan / 252; Nepal / 247; Brazil / 225; Croatia / 225; France / 214; Korea / 212; Iran / 204; Spain / 196

== Economy ==
After World War II, the site of Flugmotorenwerke Zweigwerk in Brno-Líšeň became the Zetor factory. Though it initially operated as a subsidiary of Zbrojovka, it became an independent manufacturer of tractors and agricultural equipment. At its peak in the 1970s, Zetor manufactured more than 70,000 tractors annually and employed thousands of people. The iron foundry, which was part of the site, was later acquired by the German company Heunisch-Guss. Zbrojovka itself, which once employed over 10,000 people, went bankrupt in the early 2000s and was subsequently acquired by Česká Zbrojovka. The entire group is now named Colt CZ Group SE after it acquired Colt Holding in 2021 and rebranded itself.

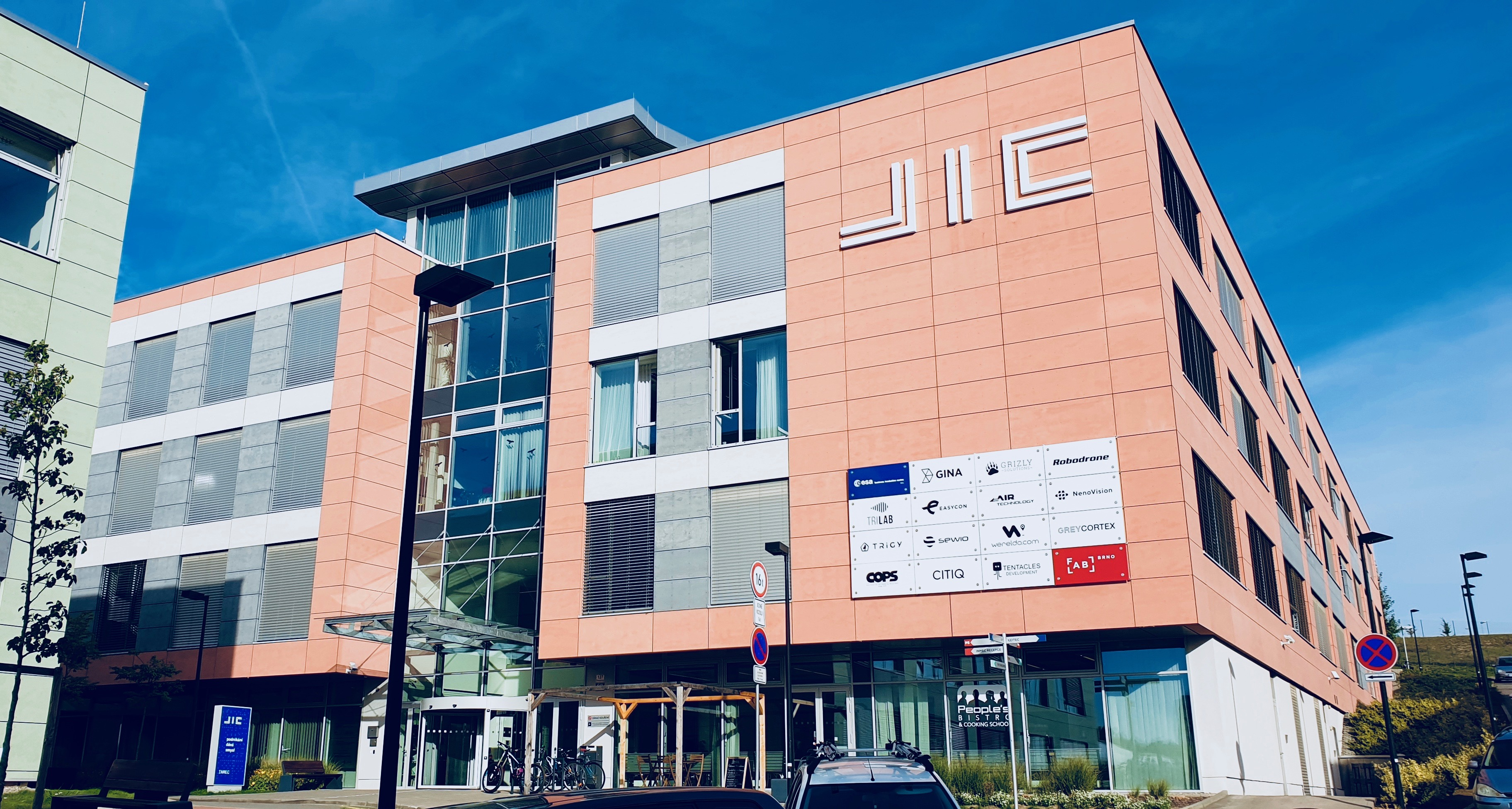
South Moravian Innovation Centre

There has been a significant shift in the local economy since the Velvet Revolution in 1989. Many new companies were created or spun off from state enterprises as part of the privatization process, while several others ceased to exist entirely. Before 1990, manufacturing and machine-building companies were pillars of Brno's economy. Since then, the city's economy has largely realigned itself with market demand for light industry, logistics, and services. Brno later gained some traction in newer engineering industries, especially in software development. After the turn of the millennium, foreign technology companies began to establish subsidiaries in Brno. Several Czech companies, with both local and global reach, also have headquarters in the city.

Notable companies based in Brno include Gen Digital (one of the headquarters, brand AVG Technologies still used), Kyndryl (Collaborative), AT&T, Honeywell (Global Design Center), Siemens, Red Hat (Czech headquarters), an office of Zebra Technologies, and formerly Silicon Graphics International (Czech headquarters). In recent years, knowledge-based drivers of economic growth, including science, research, and education, have become increasingly critical to the city's economy. Examples include AdMaS (Advanced Materials, Structures, and Technologies) or CETOCOEN (Center for Research on Toxic Substances in the Environment). The city cultivates this sector via its South Moravian Innovation Centre and the VUT Technology Incubator.

== Transport ==
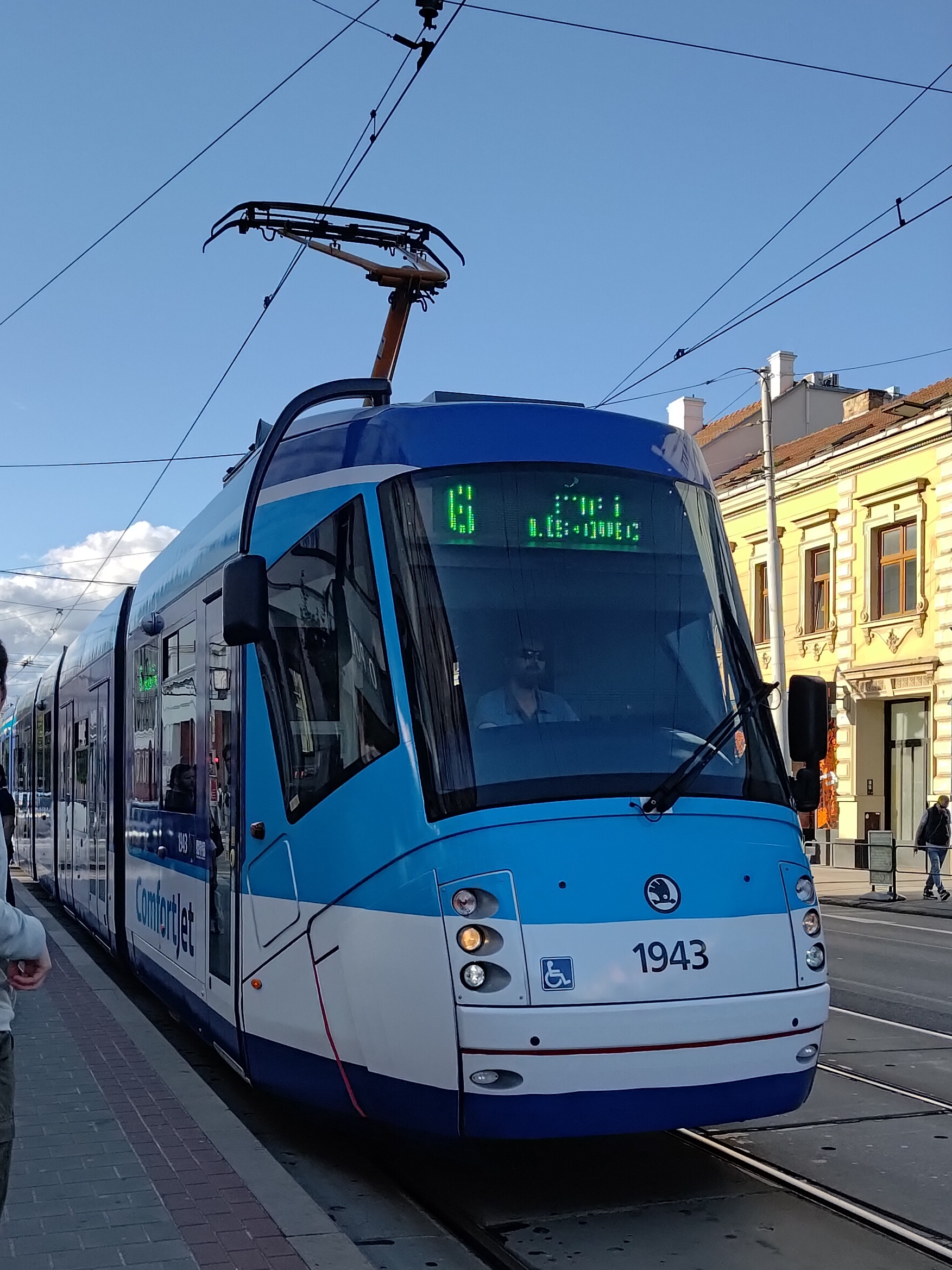
Tram service is the backbone of public transport in Brno.

Brno's public transit network is extensive. There are 11 tram lines, 13 trolleybus lines, and 47 bus routes. Trams, locally known as šaliny, are so ubiquitous that Brno has been nicknamed Šalingrad. They first appeared in 1869 with the premiere of a horse-drawn tram on the territory of the Czech Republic. The trolleybus fleet, with 157 vehicles, is the largest in the country. Local public transit integrates with regional transit into one system, IDS JMK, and links surrounding municipalities to the city. Its operator, Dopravní podnik města Brna, also operates a ferry on the Brno Reservoir. A visitor minibus provides sightseeing tours of the city. In 2024, more than half of Brno's residents relied exclusively or almost exclusively on public transit. Approximately one-third of the population relied on personal motor vehicles. Pedestrians and cyclists/scooter riders accounted for 10% combined. The base 60-minute fare, valid for rides within the city, is 25 CZK (approx. €1).

Tickets can be purchased at vending machines, at newsstands, through the operator's website or app, or through SMS from a domestic phone number. Various discounts, subsidies, and exemptions, including discounted monthly, quarterly, or annual passes (Czech: Šalinkarta), are available. In 2022, about 32,000 residents applied for a subsidy available on the annual pass. That discounted the pass from CZK 4,750 (€195) to CZK 3,325 (€137). The city allocated CZK 54 million (€2.2 million) for this benefit. With the annual pass, another adult and up to three children under 15 ride free on weekends. In 2022, Dopravní podnik města Brna converted to electronic-only passes. In 2023, approximately 153,000 prepaid passes were sold, and 70% of passengers used a Šalinkarta pass. Brno operates a night-time bus service, which is unique in the Czech Republic for its regular central meeting point of all lines. In its first 25 years of operation it was used by more than 150 million passengers. The busiest nights are Friday and Saturday, when 22 buses serving 11 bus routes transport approximately 20,000 passengers.

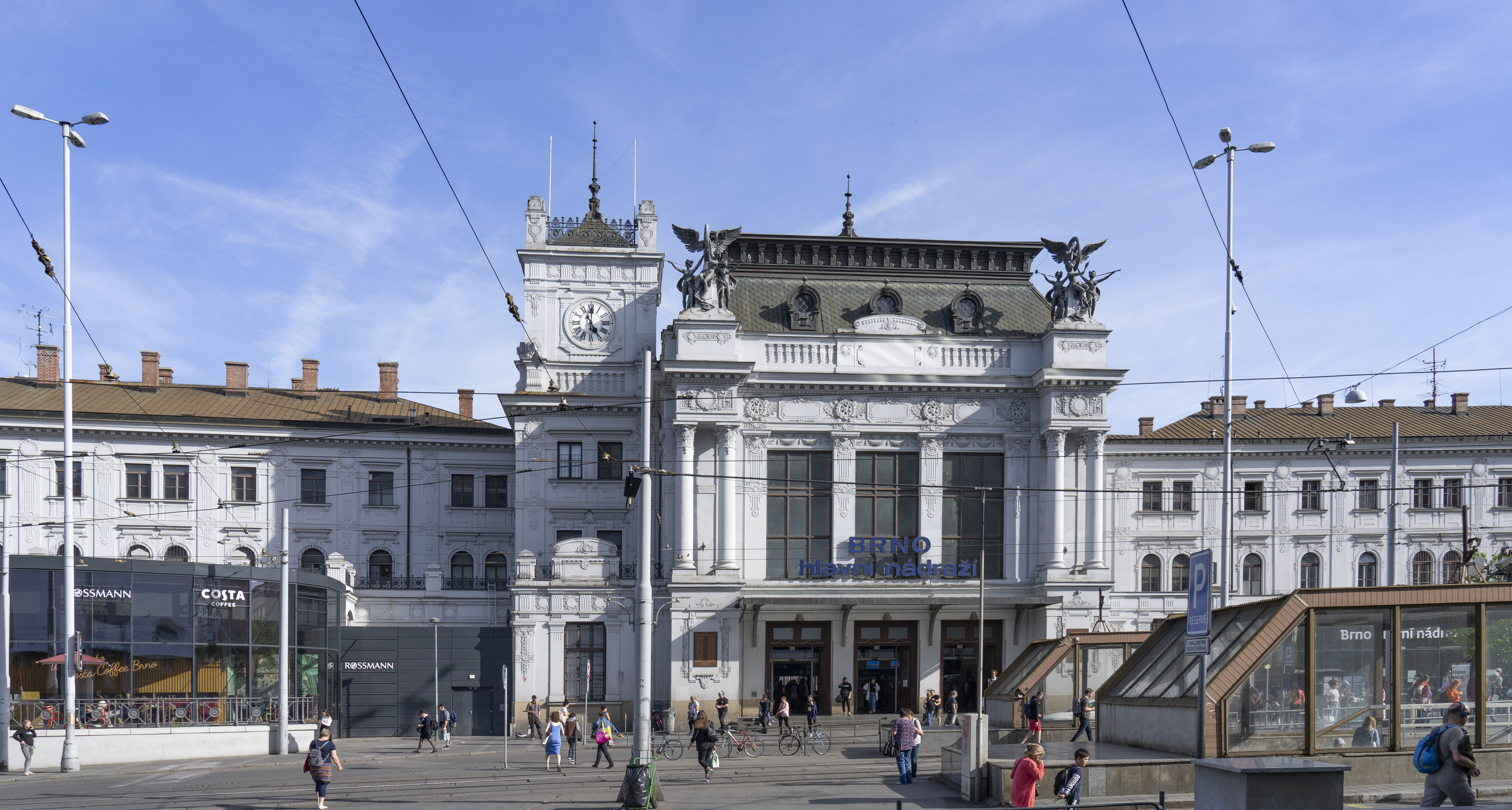
Brno hlavní nádraží railway station

Railway service began in 1839 on the Brno–Vienna line, the first operational train line in the Czech lands and the former Austro-Hungarian Empire. Today, Brno is an international railway hub with two train stations, several intermediate stops, and 24 regional train lines. There are 13 direct rail connections to national destinations and 21 non-stop international routes. Brno hlavní nádraží, the main railway station, sees about 50,000 passengers and 500 trains every day, and is the hub of regional train travel. The historic station building is outdated and has insufficient operating capacity. A referendum on the future location of the station was held twice, first in 2004 and again in 2016. Although an overwhelming majority of residents wanted the main train station to remain in its current location, the referendum results were not binding due to low turnout. In 2024, the Czech Ministry of Transport approved the construction of a new main railway station on the site of the current Brno dolní nádraží station. The project is scheduled for completion in 2035.

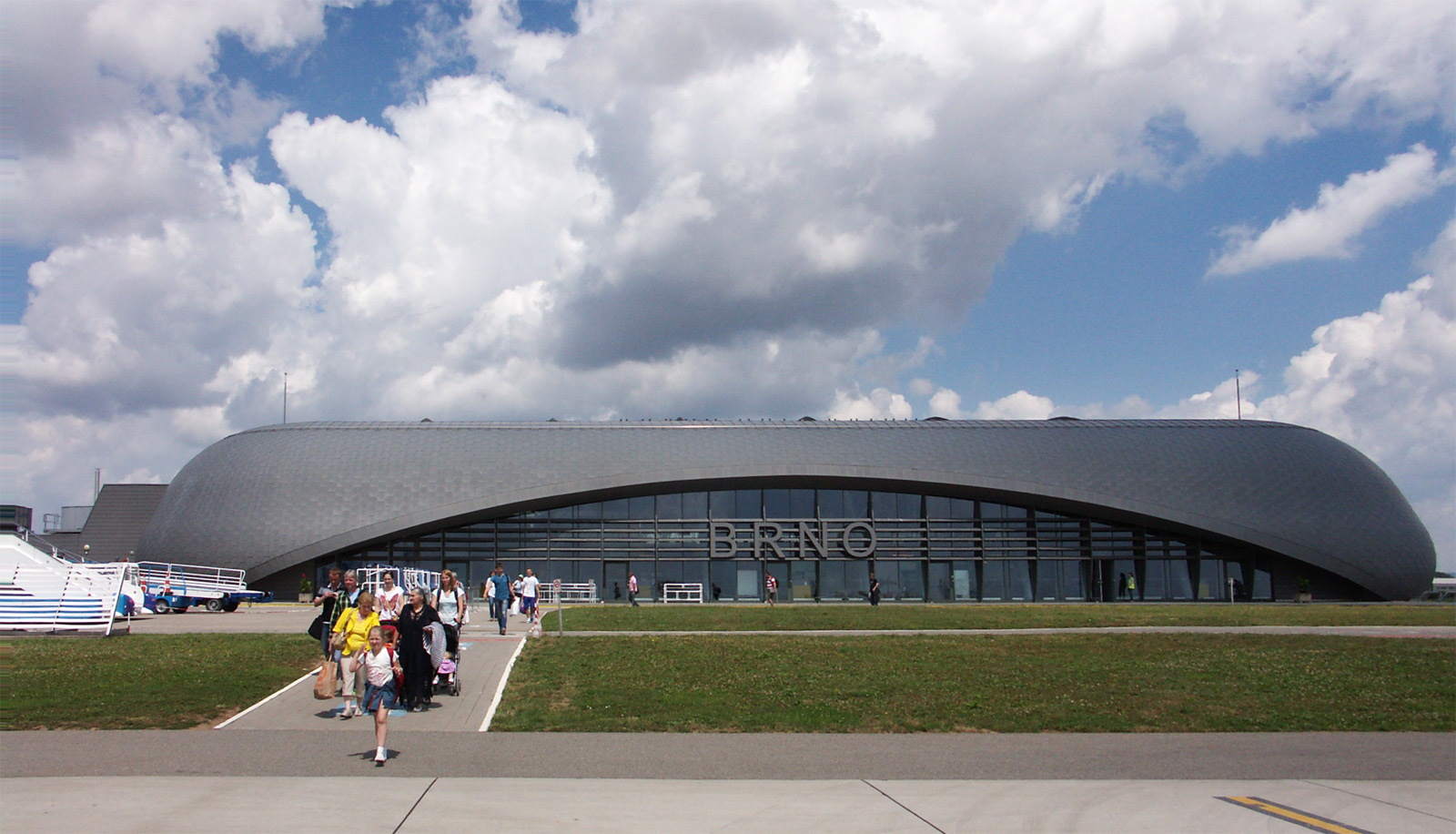
Brno-Tuřany Airport is the second busiest airport in the Czech Republic

Two motorways, the D1 and the D2, traverse the southern edge of the city. The D1 connects Brno with Prague and Ostrava, while the D2 connects the city to Bratislava. The D1 and D2 junction is one of the busiest junctions in the Czech Republic, with up to 80,000 vehicles passing through daily. To the south of the city limits is the D52, which leads to Vienna. Another planned motorway, the D43, will connect Brno to northwestern Moravia. A motorway ring, I/42, is under construction to divert traffic around the city. Several road tunnels have been built, in Pisárky, Husovice, Hlinky, and Královo Pole, as part of the I/42 project, with more planned. Brno uses a zone-based parking system, which offers free parking to residents and charges visitors a fee. The historic city centre is subject to more restrictions. Additional car parks, including underground, are being built to alleviate congestion. In 2024, there were approximately 598 cars per 1,000 residents in Brno; this figure rises by approximately nine vehicles per year. Brno uses a traffic management system that integrates real-time data and prioritizes public transit to reduce congestion and air emissions.

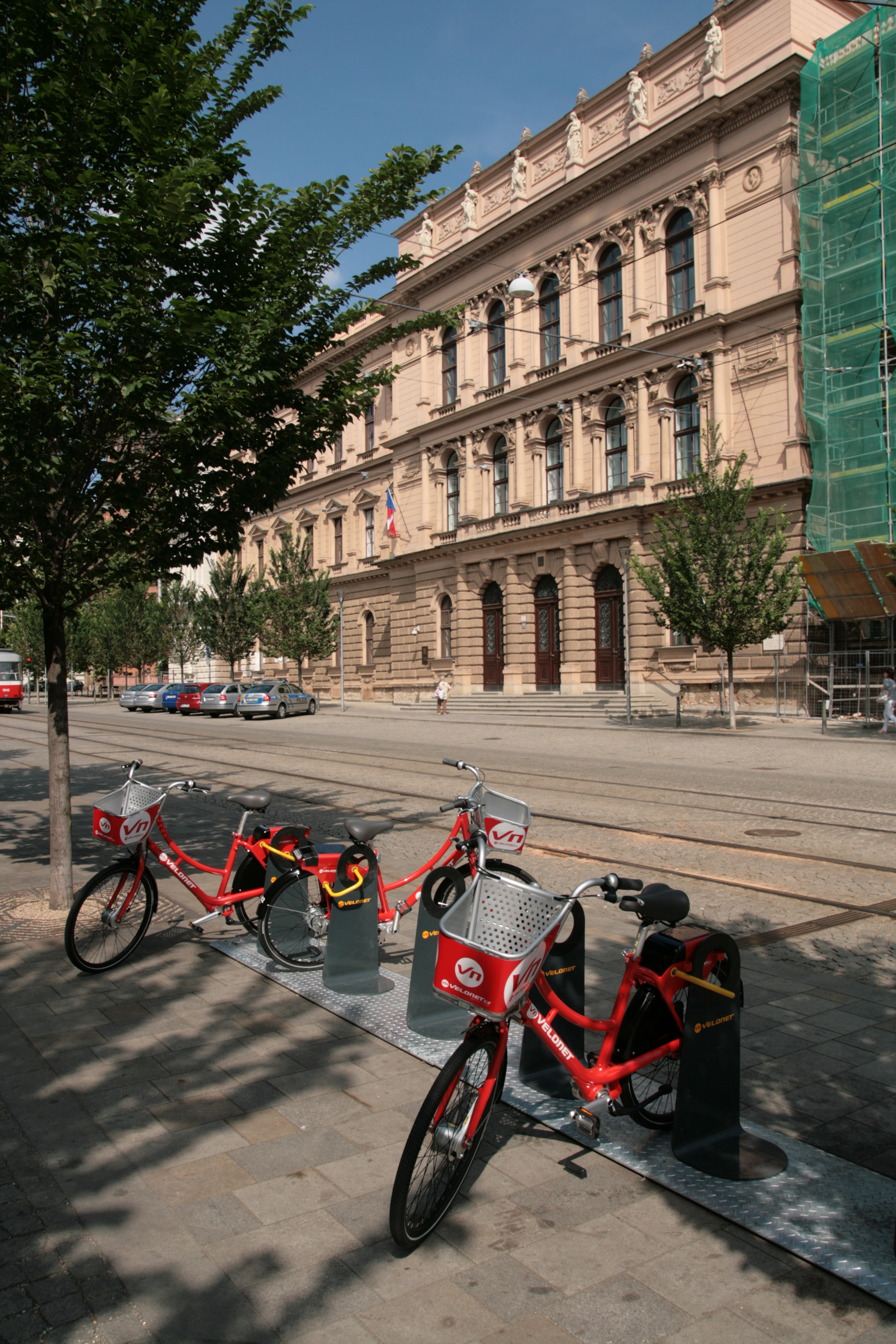
Velonet bike rentals in front of the Constitutional Court

Brno-Tuřany Airport is an international airport located about 7.5 km (5 mi) southeast of Brno's city centre. In 2024, it recorded a passenger volume of 749,153 and a cargo throughput of 11,803 tonnes (26,021,000 lb), a slight increase over the previous year. Ryanair and other airlines including Smartwings, AeroItalia, Aegean and Air Montenegro, operate scheduled services to European destinations; however, the airport primarily serves seasonal charter flights. Brno-Tuřany also serves as a police helicopter base, the only such facility outside of Prague. Separately, the municipal Medlánky Airport, located to the north, serves as a hub for ultralight general aviation and recreational activities, including hot air balloon flying, gliding, and model aircraft. The airport is home to Aeroklub Brno-Medlánky, which also operates the facility.

Cycling is a popular and widespread activity in Brno, due to the city's favorable topography. Despite Brno's car-centric layout and limited availability of bike lanes, 4% of the city's residents use bicycles as a means of transportation. There are seven well-maintained bicycle paths, including those along the Svratka and Svitava rivers, totaling 114 kilometres (71 mi). Regional bike routes include a 76 km (47 mi) bikeway to Vienna. Additionally, several hiking trails maintained by the Czech Tourist Club (KČT) pass through or near Brno, including the Stezka Českem national trail and numerous local marked trails. As of 2025, two bicycle-sharing companies operated in Brno: Nextbike and Rekola. Lime is the sole operator of shared rental scooters. In 2024, approximately 16,000 residents used bike-sharing services for 160,000 journeys, covering a distance of 276,000 kilometres (171,000 mi).

== Culture ==
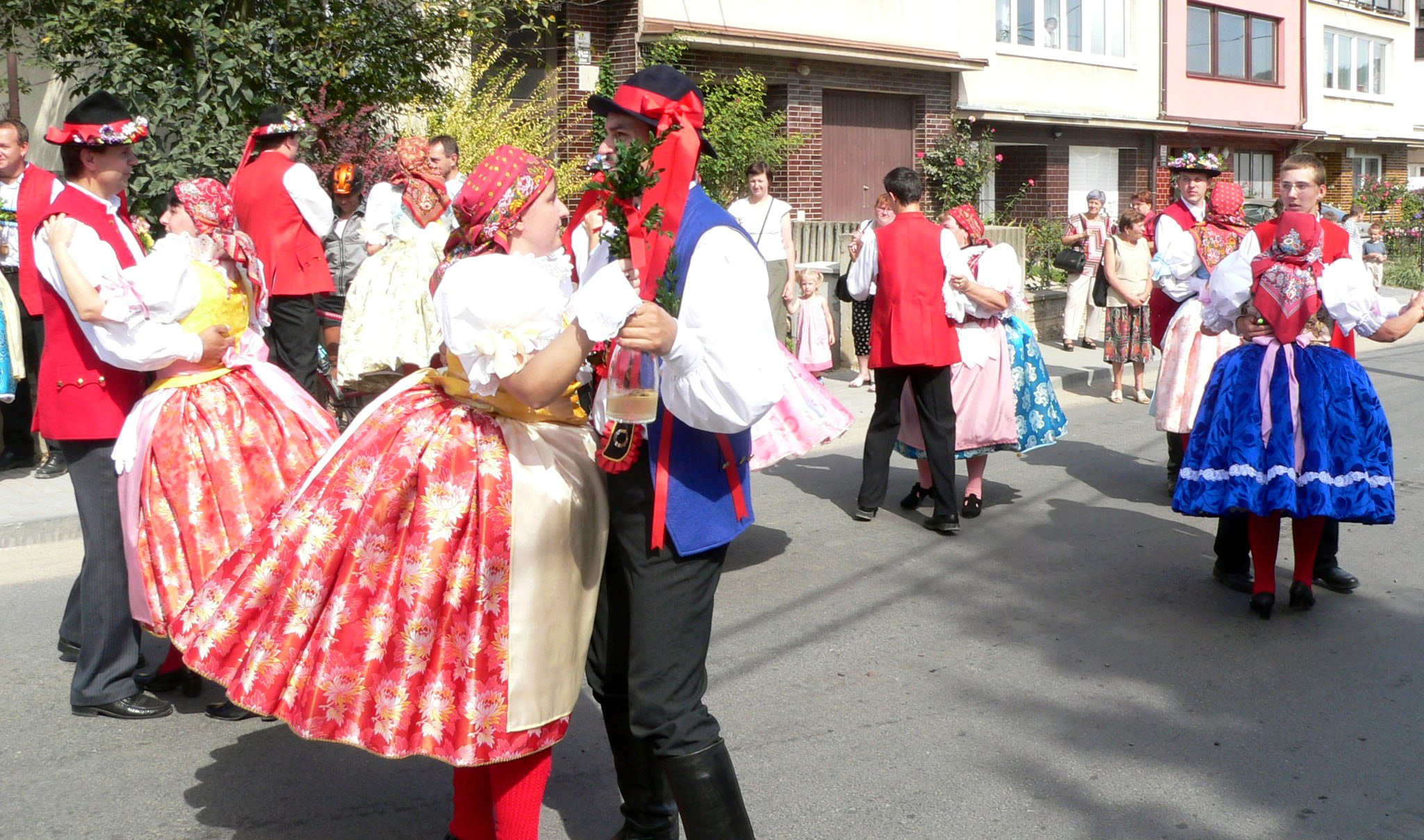
People wearing the traditional Moravian kroje (Moravian national folk costumes) at a folk festival in Líšeň

In 2023, the city spent approximately CZK 1.73 billion (€71 million) on culture. A university city with approximately 65,000 students, Brno is home to numerous museums, theatres, and other cultural institutions, and hosts a variety of festivals and cultural events. On average, Brno spent CZK 3,878.5 (€160) per capita on culture annually, significantly ahead of cities such as Ostrava (CZK 3,137.74), Olomouc (CZK 2,812.07), and Prague (CZK 1,790.51). Brno features a rich cultural life, with a diverse range of institutions and artists. More than 11,000 entities and approximately 21,000 residents (comprising about 12% of Brno's economy) are engaged in creative industries and culture. The estimated annual turnover of the entire sector exceeds CZK 24 billion (€990 million).

Brno has experienced a significant cultural "rebirth" since the Velvet Revolution of 1989. The façades of historical monuments have been repaired, and various exhibitions, shows, and other events are being established or expanded. In 2007, a summit of 15 presidents of EU Member States was held in Brno. Despite its urban character, some of the city's districts still preserve traditional Moravian folklore, including folk festivals featuring traditional Moravian costumes, local wines, folk music, and dances, held in several city districts, including Židenice, Líšeň, and Ivanovice. A local dialect, Hantec, originated in Brno. While the dialect itself is no longer in common use, certain words are still used, such as šalina (the common local term for a tram), štatl, (the city centre), and rola, (a railway station).

=== Festivals ===
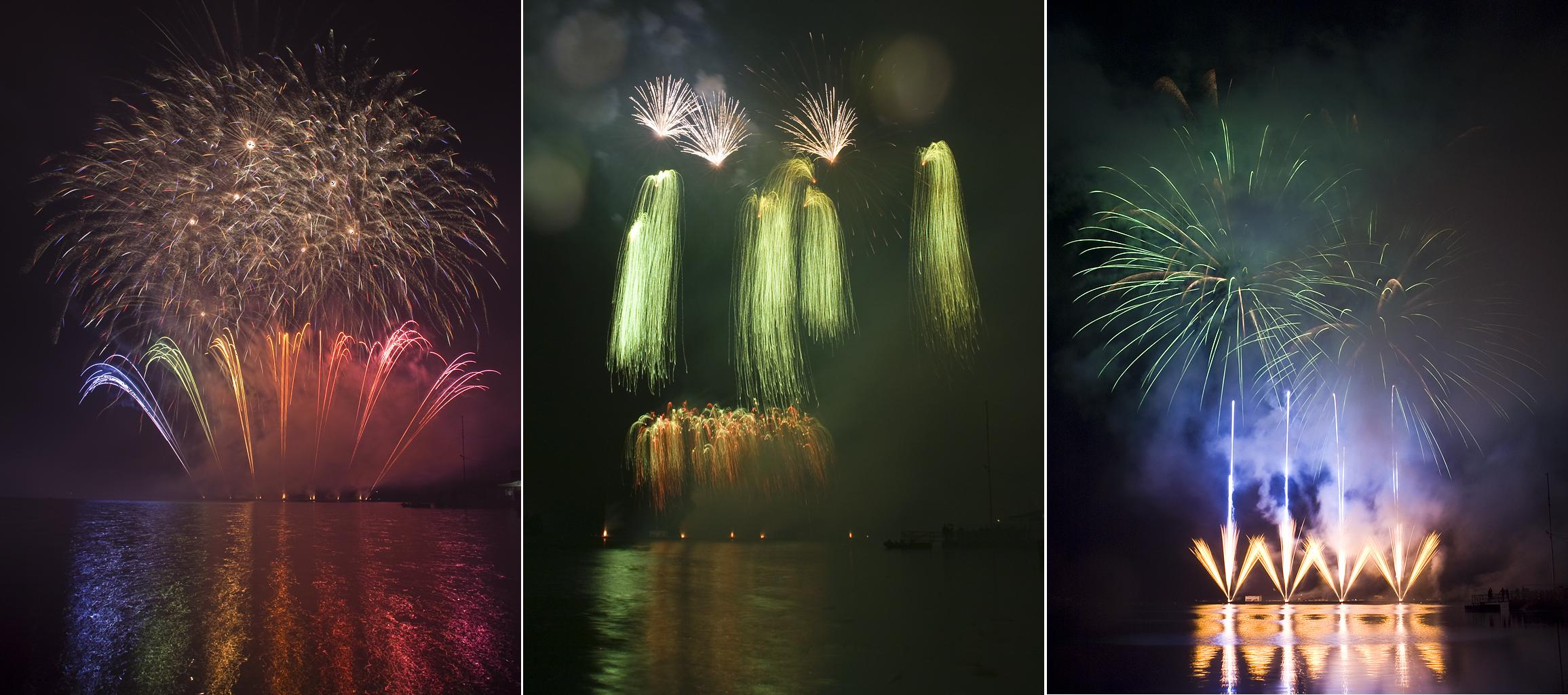
Ignis Brunensis fireworks festival on the Brno Reservoir (2010)

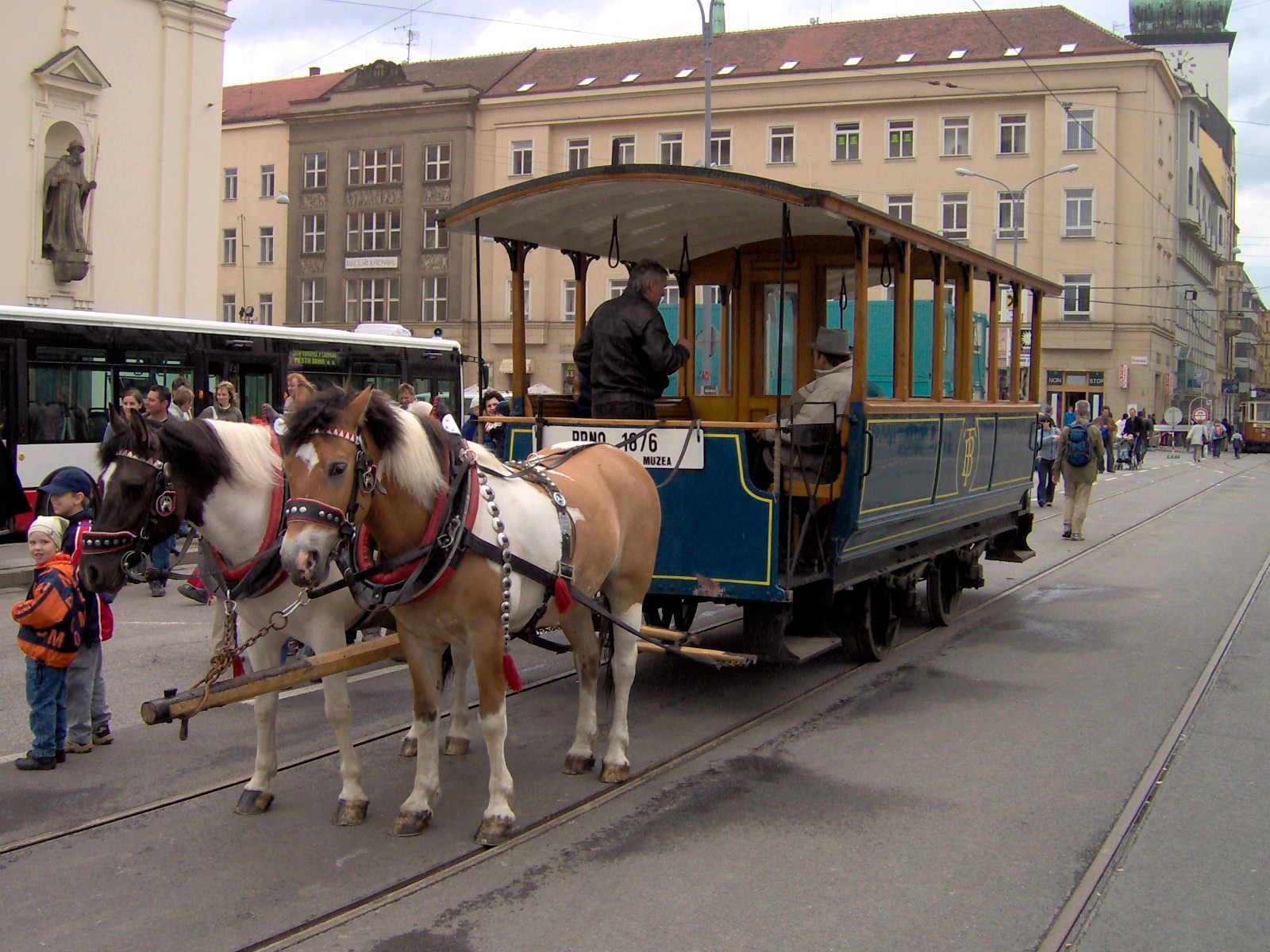
Historical horse-drawn tram at the festival called "Brno – City in the Centre of Europe"

The largest festival in Brno is the Ignis Brunensis (Latin for "Flame of Brno") fireworks competition and drone show, held annually in June as part of the "Brno – City in the Centre of Europe" festival. Ignis Brunensis is the largest event of its kind in Central Europe, with over 1.3 million attendees in 2014. Cinema Mundi was an international film festival held annually at the end of winter between 2010 and 2016. Approximately 60 films competed for an Oscar nomination in the category of Best Foreign Language Film. It resumed in 2024 with its 8th edition. Theatre World Brno is one of the largest theatre festivals in the Czech Republic. It is a collaboration between the National Theatre Brno, Husa na provázku Theatre, Municipal Theatre Brno, JAMU, and several other venues. It features dozens of performances by national and international ensembles.

Other festivals held regularly in Brno include the Spilberk International Music Festival and the Summer Shakespeare Festival. Every September, Brno hosts the Slavnosti vína wine festival to celebrate the harvest in the surrounding wine-producing region. The Moravian Autumn festival, established as the Brno International Music Festival in 1966, is among the highest-profile cultural events in the Czech Republic, bringing leading international orchestras, chamber ensembles and soloists to Brno. The Janáček Brno festival is an international opera and music festival that celebrates the works of Leoš Janáček and other Czech composers, including Antonín Dvořák. Performances are often televised and broadcast on the radio.

Brno also hosts historical reenactments and commemorative events. The reenactment of the Battle of Austerlitz draws over 1,000 attendees from more than a dozen countries each year. Another historic reenactment and parade is the Day of Brno, which commemorates the day when Brno successfully repelled the Swedish army during the Thirty Years' War. It features a re-enacted battle at the Špilberk Castle and a parade in historical uniforms through the city centre. The Annual Pilgrimage of Reconciliation commemorates the expulsion of German residents and the so-called Brno Death March. The Reconciliation March is now part of the Meeting Brno festival. It was first held in 2015 and has grown significantly in size, with 13,000 attendees in 2023. In addition to the Brno International Folklore Festival, several Brno districts, such as Medlánky and Černovice, host their own hody. This traditional Moravian village celebration combines local customs and festive activities. They are usually held in the summer and early fall, and feature folk costumes (Czech: kroj), traditional music, dancing, and a maypole.

=== Theatres ===
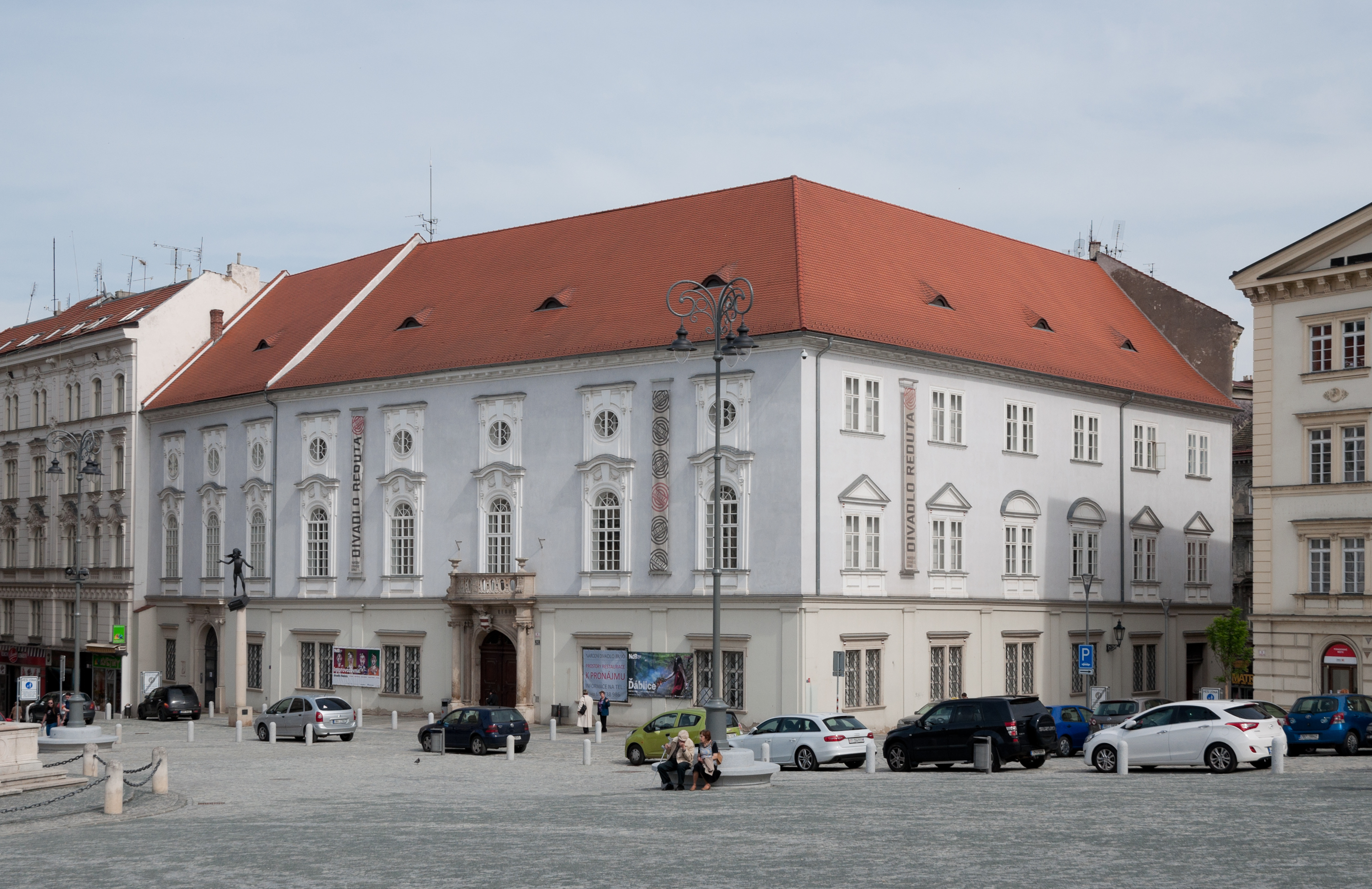
Reduta Theatre, the oldest theatre in Central Europe

Brno features the oldest theatre building in Central Europe, the Reduta Theatre, located on Zelný trh, which bears witness to the city's long tradition of the performing arts. The first theatre plays in Brno likely took place in the 1660s at what was the City Tavern, an early precursor to the Reduta Theatre. However, the first theatre building with opera boxes was constructed later, in 1733. The first documented theatre performance in the Czech language took place here in 1767. The play was called Zamilovaný ponocný (English: Watchman in Love) and was performed by the Baden Theatre Company. Mozart performed at the theatre with his sister Anna Maria (Nannerl) while his family spent Christmas in Brno that year. A Mozart statue stands in front of the theatre, commemorating their visit, and the theatre's Mozart Hall is named in his honour.

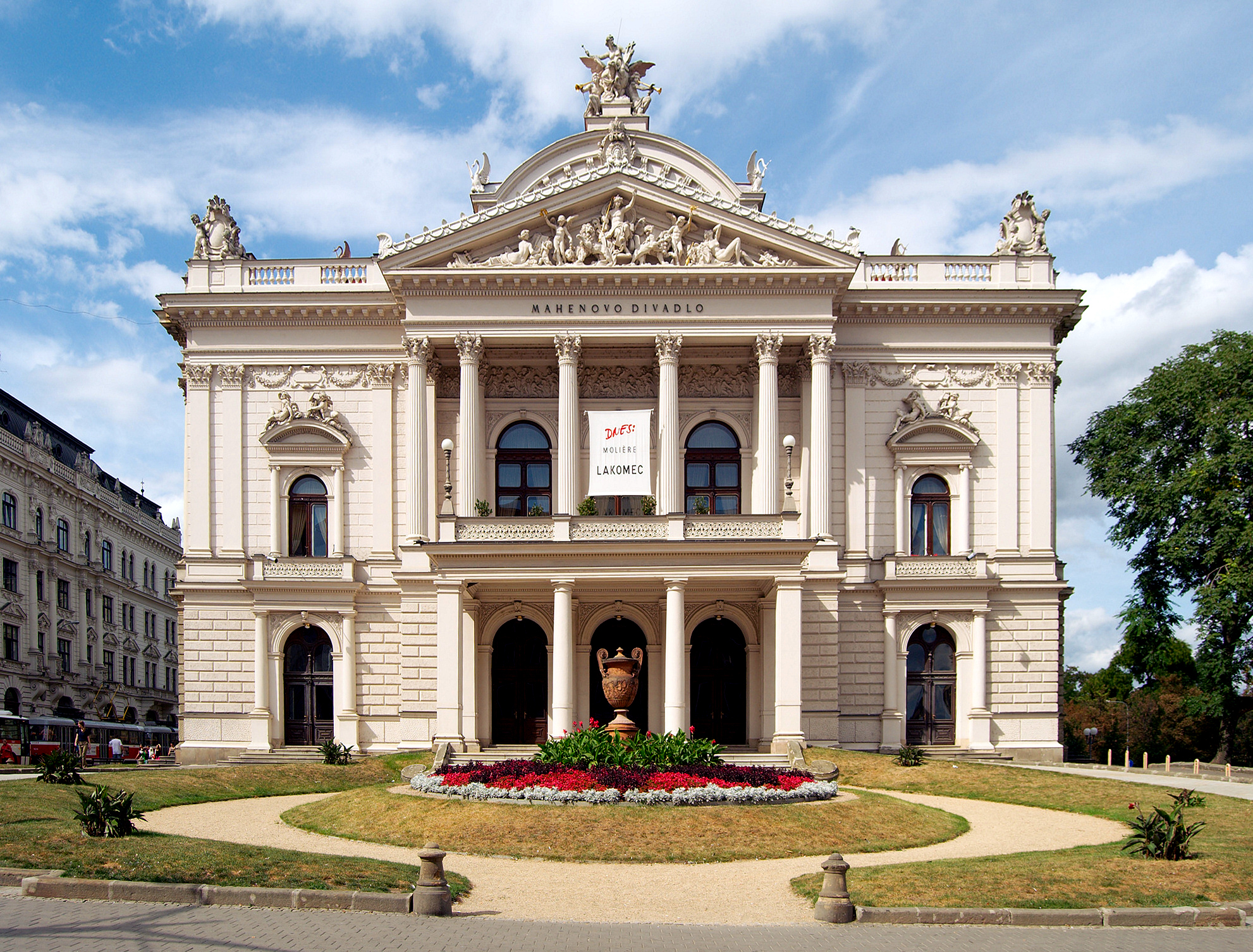
Mahen Theatre

The National Theatre Brno (NdB) is the leading producer of opera, drama, and ballet in Brno. NdB's first permanent presence was established in 1884. Today, the National Theatre Brno also owns the Mahen Theatre, which was built in 1882, the Janáček Theatre, built in 1965, and the Reduta Theatre. The composer Leoš Janáček is also associated with the National Theatre Brno. The Mahen Theatre was the first theatre building in Europe illuminated by Thomas Edison's electric light bulbs, which were a novelty at the time. A small steam-driven electric power plant was constructed near the theatre before Edison's visit to Brno in 1911. The Brno City Theatre, founded in 1945, is the most commercially successful ensemble in Brno. The theatre's local performances are routinely sold out. It performs abroad as well. The theatre's repertoire consists primarily of musical and dramatic shows.

There is a variety of smaller theatre venues in Brno, including the Bolek Polivka theatre, the Husa na provázku Theatre, HaDivadlo, Divadlo Radost, and Divadlo Polárka. The Mahen Theatre was initially known as the City Theatre and, until 1918, hosted performances exclusively in German; it was not part of the National Theatre of Brno at that time. Between 1971 and 1978, some plays were hosted by the Brno Exhibition Centre while the Mahen Theatre underwent reconstruction.

=== Local legends ===
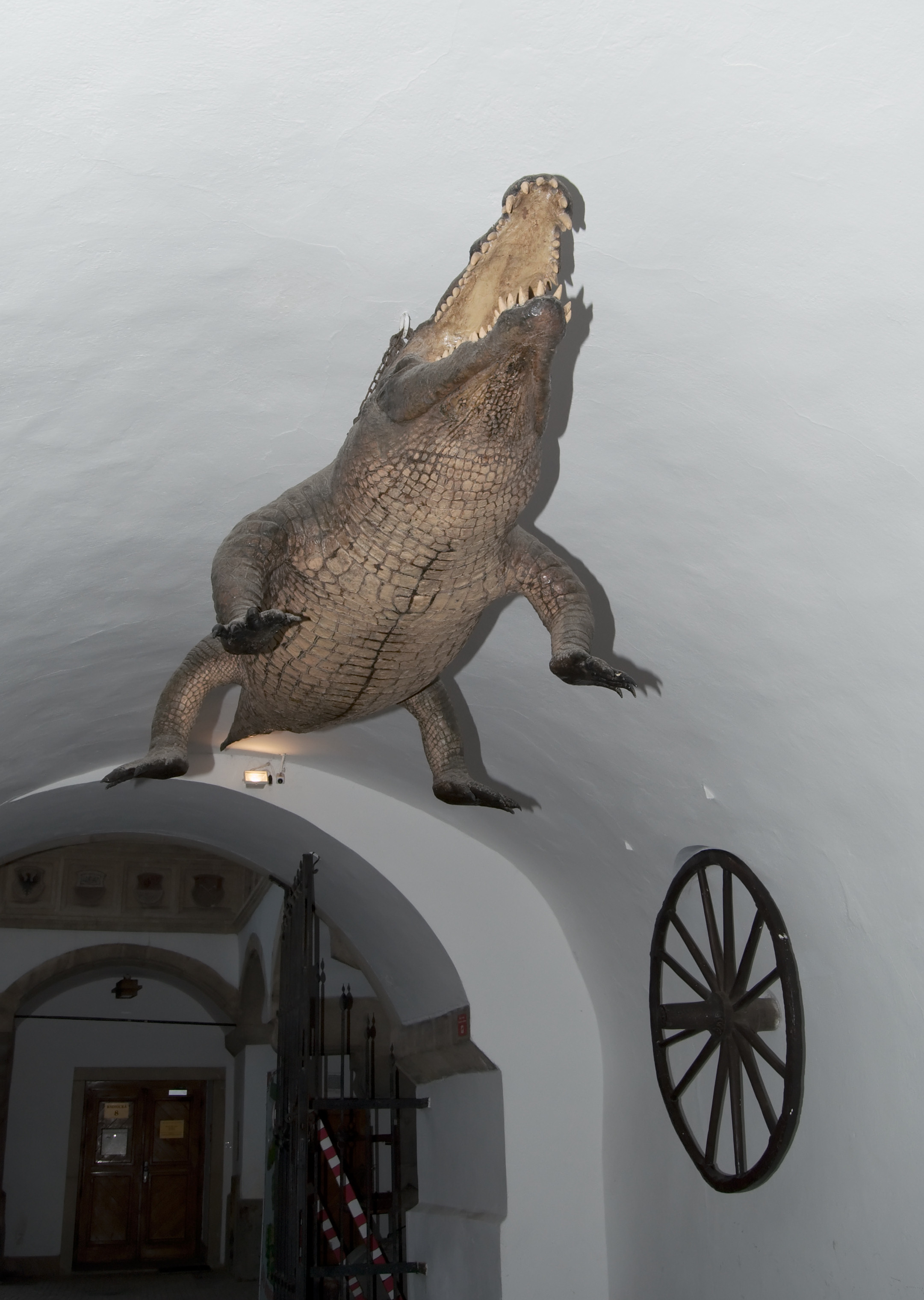
Brno Dragon and Brno Wheel at the Old Town Hall

Alligators, crocodiles, and dragons are referenced heavily in Brno, due to a local legend dating back to the Middle Ages. According to one version of the legend, a frightening creature terrorized the residents of Brno. Unfamiliar with a crocodile, they referred to it as a dragon. They lived in fear until a young butcher devised a plan to kill the monster. He filled a cowhide with quicklime and sewed it up. After eating this, the crocodile attempted to wash down the bitter aftertaste with water until its stomach burst and it died. According to another version of the story, Margrave Matthias (later the Holy Roman Emperor) was fond of animals, and the Ottomans gifted him a live crocodile. As Matthias passed through the streets of Brno, the crocodile died, and the Margrave left it behind in the city, where it has been on display ever since at the Brno Old Town Hall.

Over the years, the creature became one of the mascots of Brno. A stuffed baguette is called a crocodile (Czech: krokodýl), as is the radio station, known as Radio Krokodýl. One of the local baseball teams is named Draci Brno (English: Brno Dragons), the rugby club is RC Dragon Brno, and the American football team goes by Brno Alligators. An Intercity train connection between Brno and Prague is named Brněnský drak (English: Brno dragon). The 2024 Christmas season featured a dragon clothed in a neon jumper spewing flames. The particular specimen on display in the Old Town Hall passage is a female Nile crocodile of unknown age, about 5 m (16 ft) in length, and weighing 200 kg (440 lb). Its skin has been reinforced with metal and a plaster cast.

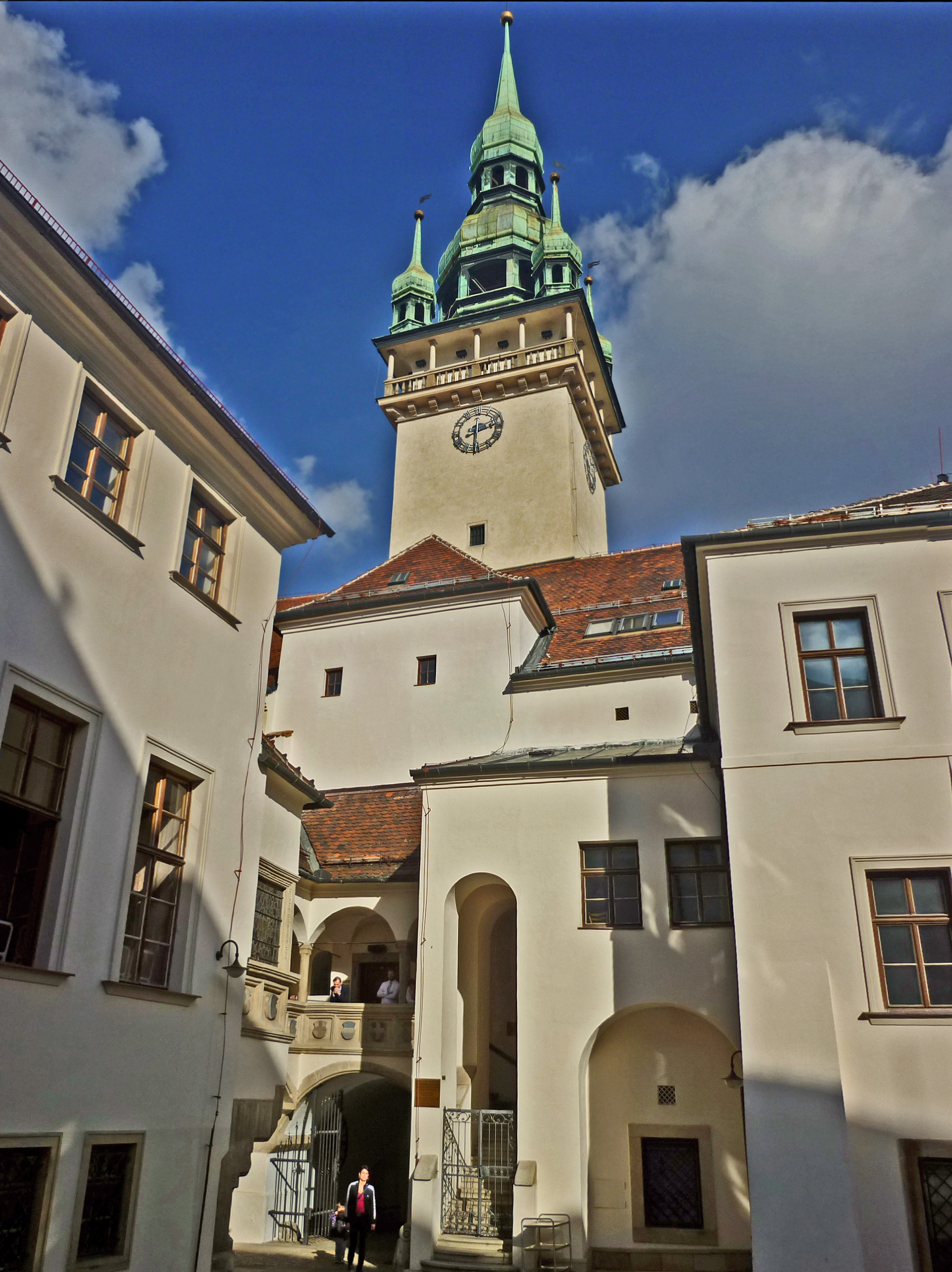
Old Town Hall in Brno

Next to the crocodile is a wagon wheel, another symbol of the city. According to the legend, a man made a wager that he could fell a tree in Lednice, 50 km (31 mi) from the city, craft a wheel out of it, and roll with it to town all within a single day. Since the feat was deemed to be impossible, the man was believed to have made a pact with the devil, was ostracized, and died penniless as a result.

Another local legend dates back to the siege of the city by the Swedish army during the Thirty Years' War in 1645. The standoff was at a stalemate, and the Swedish marshal Lennart Torstensson declared that he would withdraw if the city did not surrender to him by noon. The bell ringer at the Cathedral of Saints Peter and Paul on Petrov hill tricked the Swedes by sounding noon an hour early. In keeping his word, Field Marshal Torstensson and his army left. As a historic tribute to the Swedish siege, the bell at the Cathedral of Saints Peter and Paul still rings noon an hour early, at 11 o'clock. The Brno astronomical clock releases a glass ball at 11 a.m. every day to commemorate the heroic defense of the city. On special occasions, a glass ball rolls out every hour. As the hour approaches, the clock is typically surrounded by throngs of people hoping to catch one of the glass balls as a souvenir.

=== Museums, libraries and galleries ===
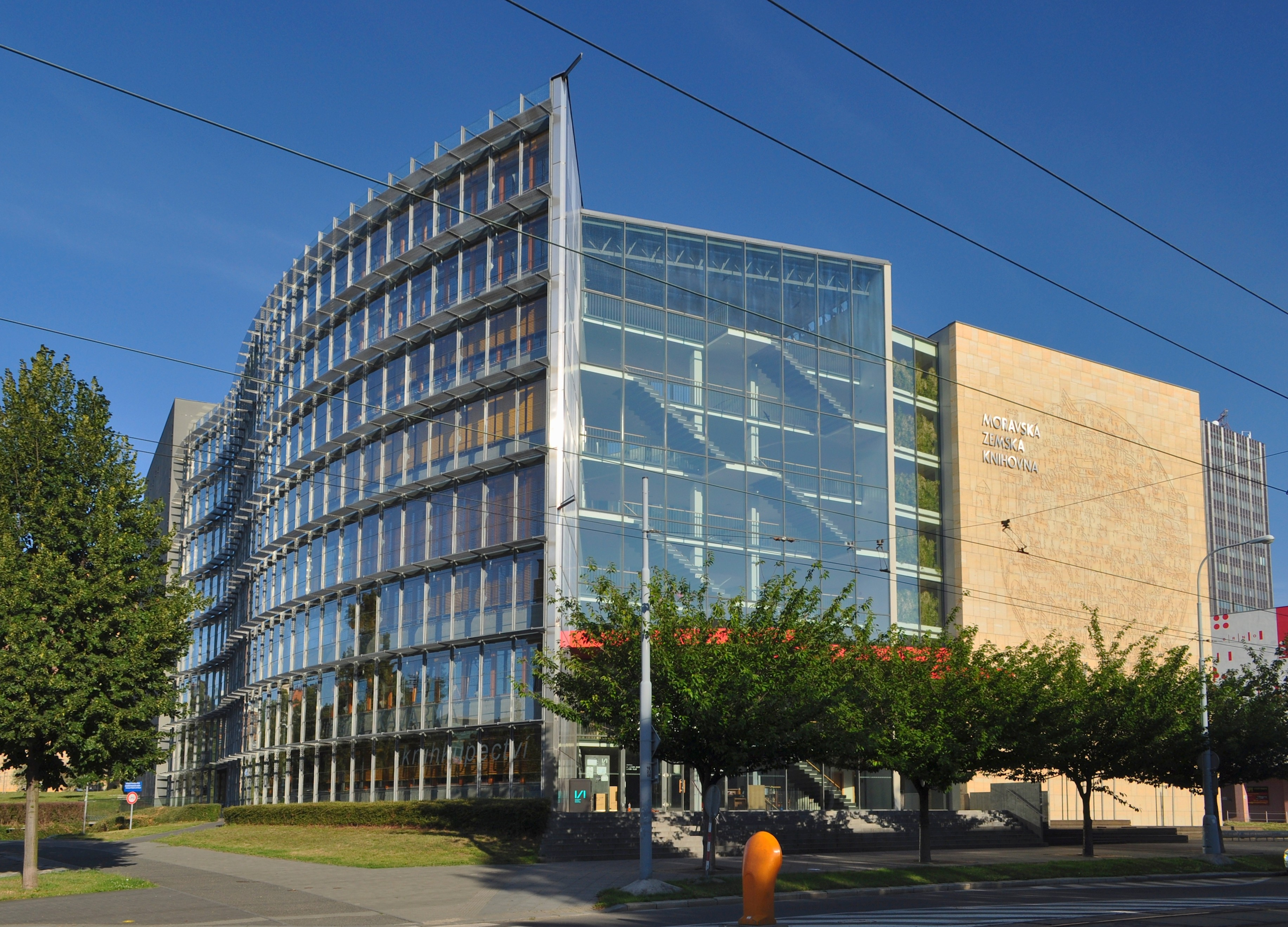
Moravian Library building

The most significant museum in Brno is the Moravian Museum, the largest in Moravia and the second largest in the Czech Republic. The museum was founded in 1817, and its collections comprise over 6 million pieces. The most extensive public library in Brno is the Moravian Library. With approximately 4 million volumes, it is the second largest library in the Czech Republic. The most extensive gallery in Brno is the Moravian Gallery, which again ranks second in the Czech Republic and is the largest in Moravia.

One section of the Moravian Museum, the Anthropos Pavilion, is related to the earliest history of humanity and prehistoric Europe. Brno is also home to one of the largest technical museums in the Czech Republic, which hosts 17 permanent displays charting the advance of science and technology, accompanied by various models and restored machinery. The museum also hosts multiple short-term exhibitions that complement its emphasis on metallurgy, cutlery, mechanical music, steamships, clockwork, and water machines.

== Education ==
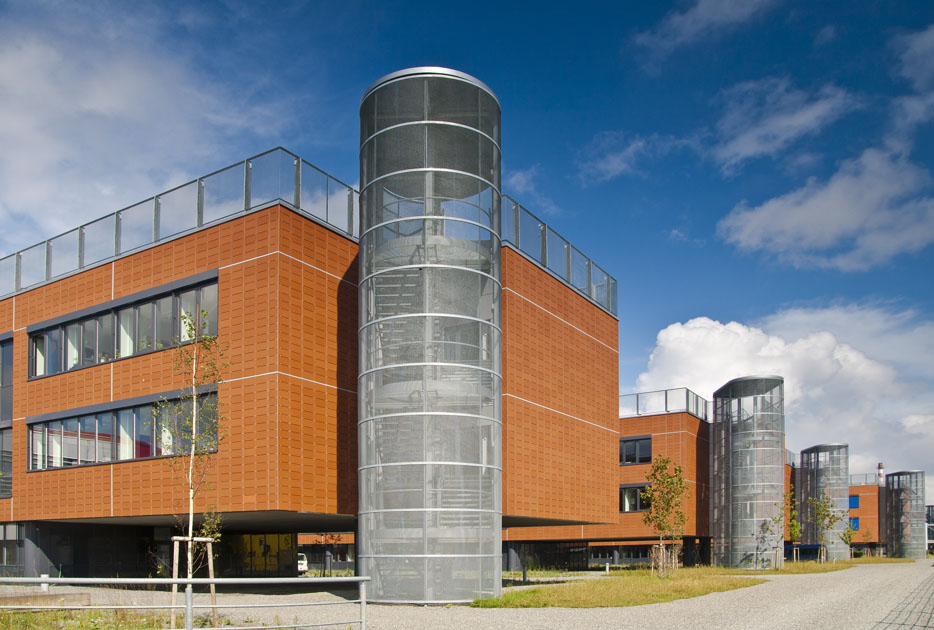
Faculty of Education, Masaryk University, Brno-Bohunice

Brno is home to 10 universities and more than 60 secondary schools. In 2024, over 65,000 students were enrolled in Brno's higher education institutions. The student population has increased by 6.4% over the past five years, reversing the downward trend that had persisted through the 2010s, and now one in six Brno residents is a student. The city is also home to several research and development institutions, including the Central European Institute of Technology (CEITEC) and the International Clinical Research Center (ICRC). While classes taught in English are subject to tuition fees, instruction in Czech is free to everyone, including international students. The three most prominent universities in the region, Masaryk University, Brno University of Technology, and Mendel University in Brno, all participate in the Erasmus programme.

With over 35,000 students, Masaryk University, also known as MUNI, is the largest university in Brno. Founded in 1919, it comprises ten faculties, 400 study programmes, over 190 departments, institutes, and clinics. MUNI consistently ranks among the top 500 universities globally and second, after Charles University, in the Czech Republic. The Brno University of Technology, VUT, was established in 1899 and is now one of the largest technical universities in the Czech Republic, with approximately 18,000 students. It ranks among the top 41% of universities globally and fifth in the nation. Viktor Kaplan, the inventor of the Kaplan turbine, spent nearly 30 years at the German Technical University in Brno, a precursor institution that closed after World War II in 1945.

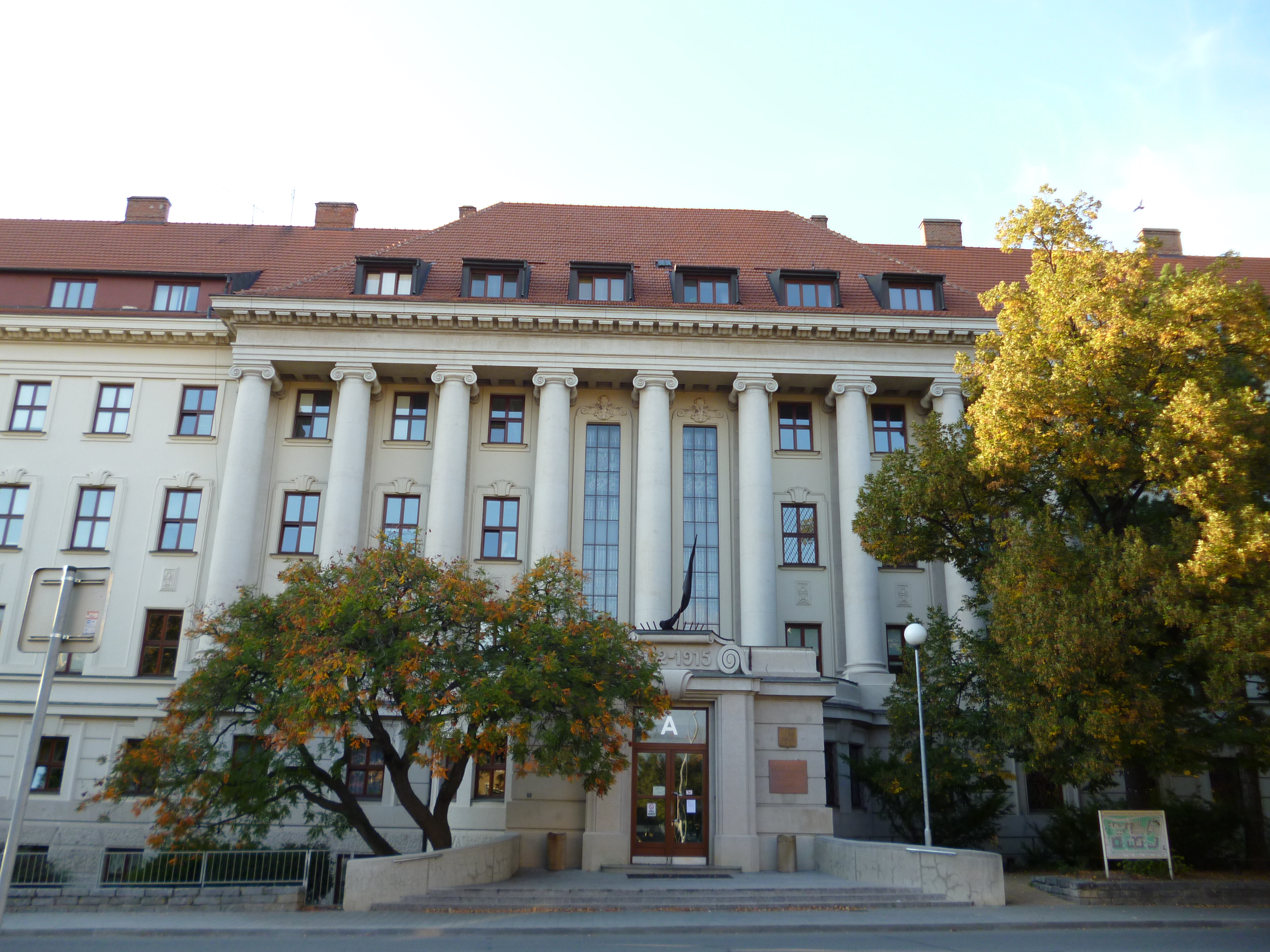
Mendel University in Brno

The Mendel University, or MENDELU, was established in 1919 and is named after Gregor Mendel, the founder of genetics, who developed his revolutionary scientific theories in Brno. It focuses on life sciences and has over 10,000 students. It ranks 9th in the Czech Republic and 1267th globally (177th in Plant and Animal Science).

The Janáček Academy of Music and Performing Arts, or JAMU, named after Leoš Janáček, was founded in 1947 and is one of two academies of music and drama in the Czech Republic. It holds the annual Leoš Janáček Competition. The University of Veterinary Sciences Brno is the only university in the Czech Republic for the study of veterinary sciences. Founded in 1918, the VETUNI has an estimated total enrollment of approximately 350 students, with 76 new students enrolled in the 2024/25 academic year. VETUNI ranks 699th in Plant and Animal Science globally.

== Sport ==
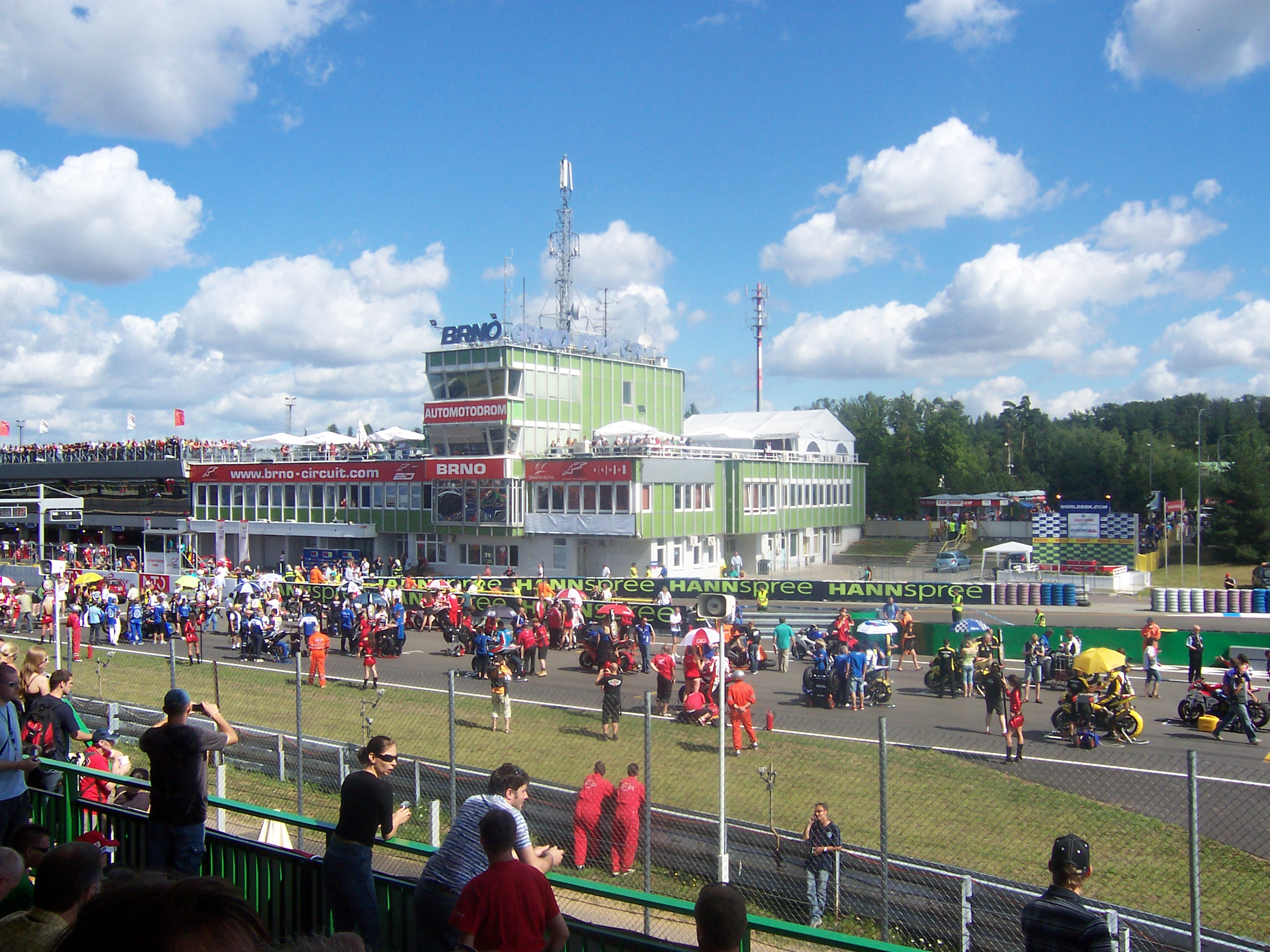
Motorcycle racing championship at the Masaryk Circuit

The city has a long association with motor racing; among other events, the Masaryk Circuit has hosted the Moto GP championship since 1965. The annual Czech Republic motorcycle Grand Prix, the most famous motor race in the Czech Republic, has been held in the city since 1950. Since 1968, Brno has been a permanent fixture on the European Touring Car Championship (ETCC) series.

Track and road cycling have a long history in Brno. The first track races took place here in 1889, and the velodrome in Brno ranks among the oldest velodromes in the world. In 1969, Brno hosted the UCI Track Cycling World Championships and the UCI Road World Championships for amateurs. In 1981, the UCI Track Cycling World Championships were held, and in 2001, the UEC European Track Championships were held for the U23 category. There are two traditional cycling teams: TJ Favorit Brno and Dukla Brno.

The 2010 FIBA World Championship for Women was played in Brno's Arena Vodova, with the Czech squad taking the silver medal.

There is a horse-race course at Brno-Dvorská and an aeroclub airport in Medlánky Airport. Several sports clubs represent the city in the various Czech leagues, including FC Zbrojovka Brno and SK Artis Brno (football), HC Kometa Brno (ice hockey), KP Brno (basketball, women), BC Brno (basketball, men) and BK Brno (women), four baseball teams (Draci Brno, Hroši Brno, VSK Technika Brno, MZLU Express Brno), Brno Ravens LC (lacrosse club), Brno Alligators (American football), two rugby teams (RC Dragon Brno, RC Bystrc) and others. Tennis players Barbora Krejčíková, Lucie Šafářová, Lukáš Rosol, and Jana Novotná are from Brno, as well as Michal Březina, one of the top Czech figure skaters.

Motorcycle speedway events were held at the Winter Stadium, off Na Rybníčku in Králové Pole. The venue hosted a final round of the Czechoslovak Individual Speedway Championship in 1949, 1950 and 1954.

== Sights ==
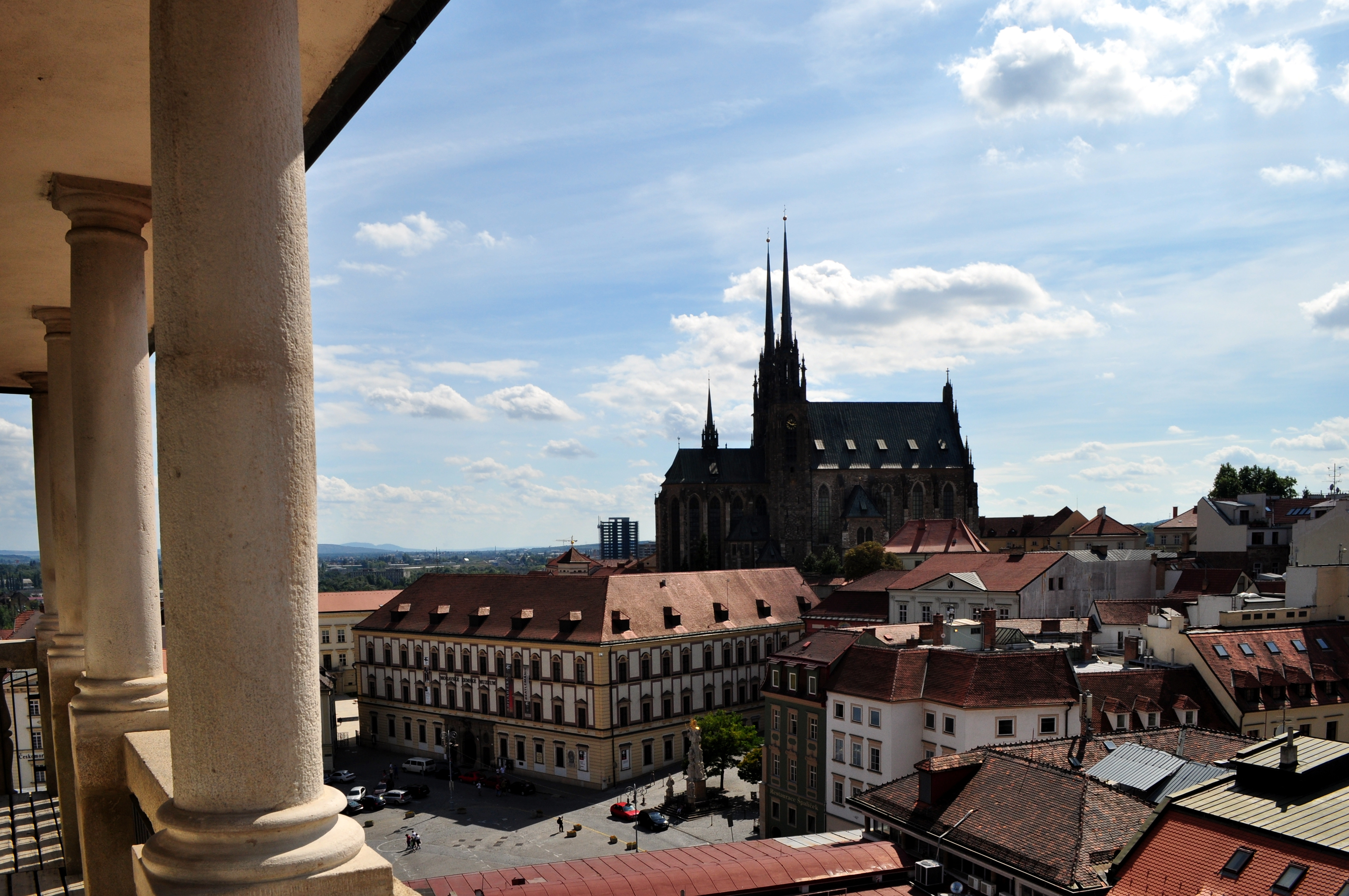
The Cathedral of Saints Peter and Paul and Dietrichstein Palace viewed from the tower of the Old Town Hall

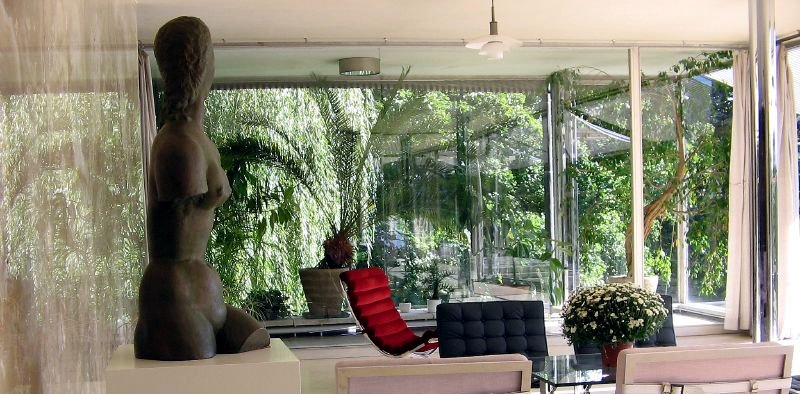
Villa Tugendhat, protected as a UNESCO World Heritage Site

Brno has over 380 protected cultural sites and objects, of which one is designated as a UNESCO World Heritage Site, and 11 monuments (excluding two movable monuments) are protected as national cultural monuments. Most of them are in the historical city centre, but some are located in the outer districts of the city.

The Old Town Hall (Czech: Stará radnice), dating back to approximately 1240, is the oldest secular building in Brno and has been registered as a national cultural monument since 2024. Its observation deck is 63 metres above ground, and the central passageway houses the Brno dragon and a cartwheel, both symbols of the city. Špilberk Castle, originally a royal seat founded in the 13th century, became a fortress and later a prison from the 17th century onwards (e.g., the Carbonari). Today, it is one of the city's major landmarks. The park and gardens around the castle, established in 1861, are notable for their landscaping, as well as an observation point also known as the Špilberk Arbour.

Another key landmark is the Cathedral of St. Peter and Paul, located on Petrov hill. The site initially housed an 11th-century Romanesque chapel, which was rebuilt into a Romanesque basilica in the 13th century. The exterior of the cathedral was rebuilt as a three-nave Gothic basilica in the 14th century. Further modifications followed in the 15th and 16th centuries. The interior is mostly Baroque, as a result of extensive renovations in the mid-18th century. The structure was completed in its present form, including the addition of two distinct Neo-Gothic towers designed by architect August Kirstein, in 1909. The cathedral is a national cultural monument and its image is featured on the Czech 10-koruna coin.

Veveří Castle, about 20 km (12 mi) from the city centre, is the third-largest historic monument in Brno. Founded in the Middle Ages as a hunting lodge for the Moravian margraves, it is among the largest and oldest castles in the Czech Republic. Its last owner was Baron Maurice de Forest, an early motor racing driver, aviator, and close friend of Winston Churchill, who visited the castle several times.

The Abbey of Saint Thomas, the site of Gregor Mendel's genetics experiments, is also linked with Leoš Janáček. The Church of Saint Tomas houses the graves of John Henry, its founder, and his son, Jobst of Moravia, both margraves of Moravia. The Basilica of the Assumption of Our Lady is the final resting place of Queen Elisabeth Richeza. The Church of Saint James is one of the best-preserved Gothic churches in Brno.

The Brno Ossuary is the second largest in Europe after the Catacombs of Paris. Another smaller ossuary is the Capuchin Crypt, which houses mummies of Capuchin monks and other notable figures of their era, including architect Mořic Grimm and the mercenary leader Baron Trenk. The Labyrinth under Zelný trh, a system of underground corridors and cellars dating back to the Middle Ages, have historically served as beer and wine cellars, food storage, and wartime shelters, and have more recently become a tourist attraction. They were previously not as interconnected as they are now, following an extensive reconstruction completed in 2009.

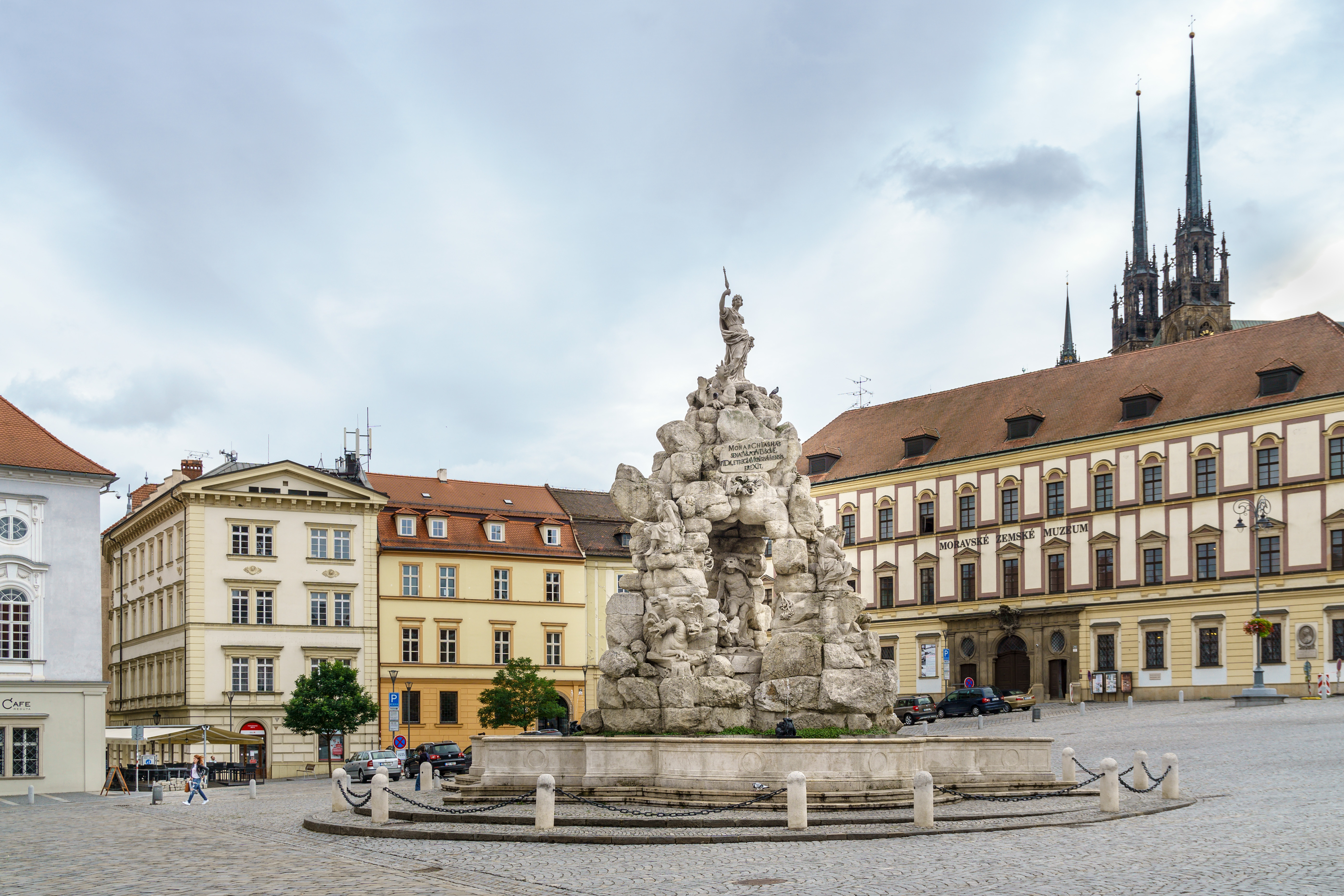
Zelný trh with Parnassus Fountain

Brno was home to a sizable Jewish community since at least the 13th century. The city is home to a functionalist synagogue built between 1934 and 1936, and the largest Jewish cemetery in Moravia. Tombstones and other cemetery artifacts date back to 1349. It is estimated that the Jewish community comprised about 12,000 individuals in 1938. Only about 1,000 of them survived the Holocaust and Nazi persecution during World War II. The cemetery and the synagogue are maintained by Brno's remaining Jewish community. The only mosque in the Czech Republic, founded in 1998, is also located in Brno.

The interwar period saw a significant construction boom, as evidenced by numerous modernist and functionalist buildings. The Villa Tugendhat, designed by architect Ludwig Mies van der Rohe in the 1920s for the family of Fritz Tugendhat, was completed in 1930. It was designated a UNESCO World Heritage Site in 2001. Another notable architect who significantly contributed to Brno's cityscape was Arnošt Wiesner. Other examples of functionalist buildings include the Hotel Avion and Palace Moravia. The Brno Exhibition Centre hosts more than 40 trade fairs and conferences annually, attracting over 1 million visitors.

Lužánky is the oldest public park in the Czech Republic, established in the late 18th century by Emperor Joseph II. Denisovy sady, founded in the early 19th century, was the first public park in the Czech Republic to be established by public authorities. More recent additions include the Brno astronomical clock and the AZ Tower, commissioned in 2013, and at 111 metres (364 ft), the tallest building in the Czech Republic.

== Notable people ==
- Heinrich Wilhelm Schott (1794–1865), botanist
- Gregor Mendel (1822–1884), scientist; lived and died here
- Ernst Mach (1838–1916), physicist and philosopher
- Maria Neruda (1840–1920), violinist
- Eugen von Böhm-Bawerk (1851–1914), economist
- Ludwig Strakosch (1855–1919), operatic baritone
- Adolf Loos (1870–1933), architect
- Friedrich Maria Urban (1878–1964), Austrian-Czech psychologist
- Anca Seidlova (1895–1982), Czech-American pianist
- Erich Wolfgang Korngold (1897–1957), composer and conductor
- Ladislav Vácha (1899–1943), gymnast
- Hugo Haas (1901–1968), actor and director
- Jan Gajdoš (1903–1945), gymnast
- Georg Placzek (1905–1955), physicist
- Kurt Gödel (1906–1978), philosopher, mathematician and physicist
- Karel Höger (1909–1977), actor
- Bohumil Hrabal (1914–1997), author
- Vítězslava Kaprálová (1915–1940), composer and conductor
- Zvi Dershowitz (1928–2023), American rabbi
- Milan Kundera (1929–2023), writer
- Woody Vasulka (1937–2019), Czech-American artist
- Rudolf Potsch (born 1937), ice hockey player
- Jiří Daler (born 1940), cyclist
- Lubo Kristek (born 1943), artist
- Jiří Pospíšil (1950–2019), basketball player
- Jan Stejskal (born 1962), footballer
- Roman Kukleta (1964–2011), footballer
- Robert Kron (born 1967), ice hockey player
- Jana Novotná (1968–2017), tennis player
- Jaromír Blažek (born 1972), footballer
- Magdalena Kožená (born 1973), opera singer
- Libor Zábranský (born 1973), ice hockey player and coach
- David Kostelecký (born 1975), sports shooter
- Adam Svoboda (1978–2019), ice hockey player
- Miroslava Knapková (born 1980), rower
- Jan Polák (born 1981), footballer
- Lucie Šafářová (born 1987), tennis player
- Tomáš Slavík (born 1987), mountain biker
- Little Caprice (born 1988), pornographic film actress
- Karel Abraham (born 1990), motorcycle racer
- Jiří Procházka (born 1992), mixed martial artist; lives here
- Adam Ondra (born 1993), rock climber
- Nicole Melichar (born 1993), American tennis player
- Barbora Krejčíková (born 1995), tennis player
- Natálie Puškinová (born 2004), model, beauty pageant winner as Miss Earth 2025.

== International relations ==
=== Twin towns – sister cities ===
Brno is twinned with:

- Bratislava, Slovakia
- Dallas, United States
- Debrecen, Hungary
- Kaunas, Lithuania
- Kharkiv, Ukraine
- Leeds, England, United Kingdom
- Leipzig, Germany
- Lviv, Ukraine
- Poznań, Poland
- Rennes, France
- Sankt Pölten, Austria
- Stuttgart, Germany
- Uzhhorod, Ukraine
- Zagreb, Croatia

=== Cooperation agreements ===
Brno also cooperates with:

- Daejeon, South Korea
- Utrecht, Netherlands
- Taoyuan, Taiwan
- Vienna, Austria

=== Nearby cities ===
This tool shows only cities with a population over 300,000 within a radius of 300 km (186.41 mi).

== Gallery ==
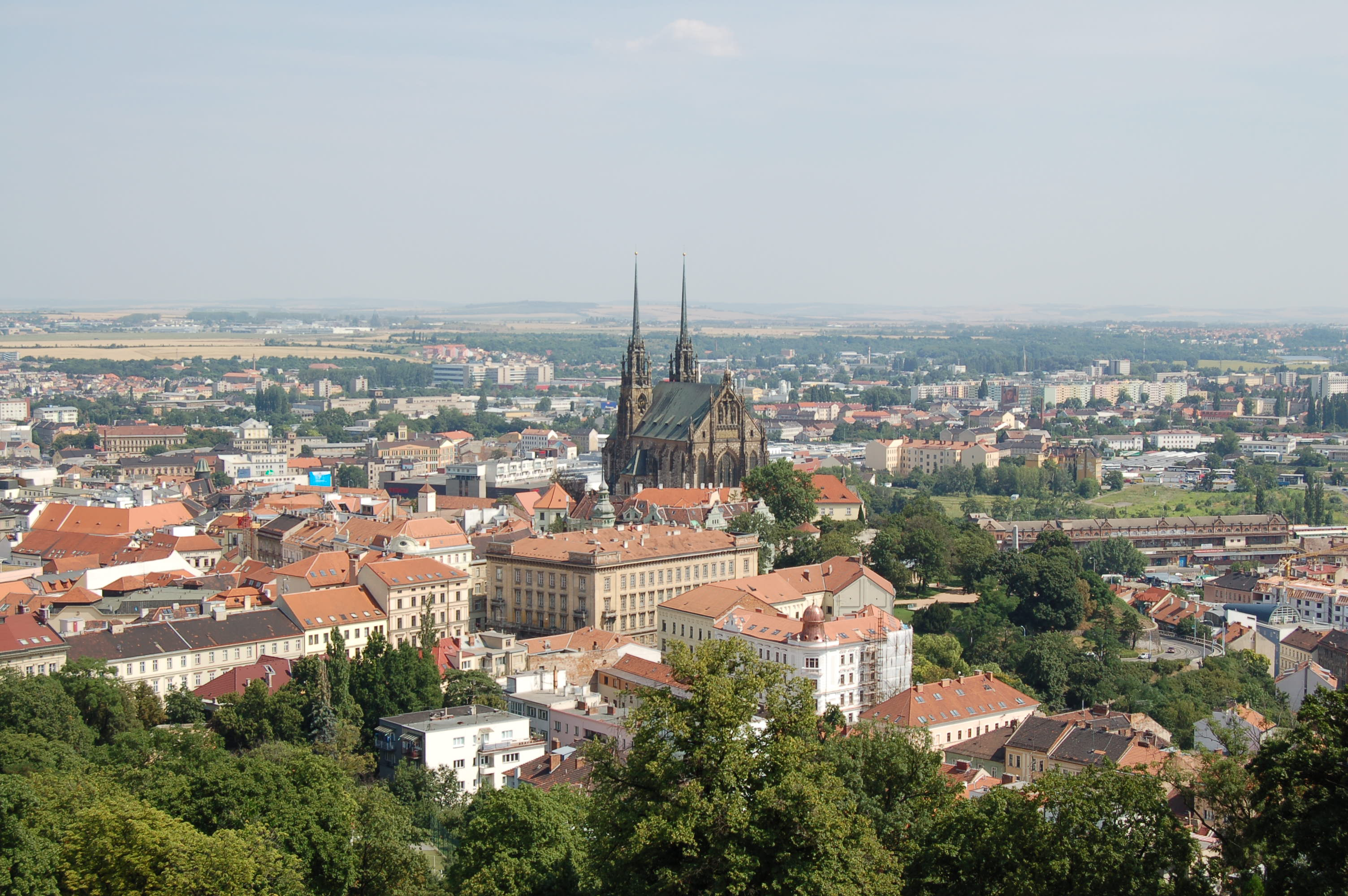
A view from Špilberk Castle

Petrov Cathedral

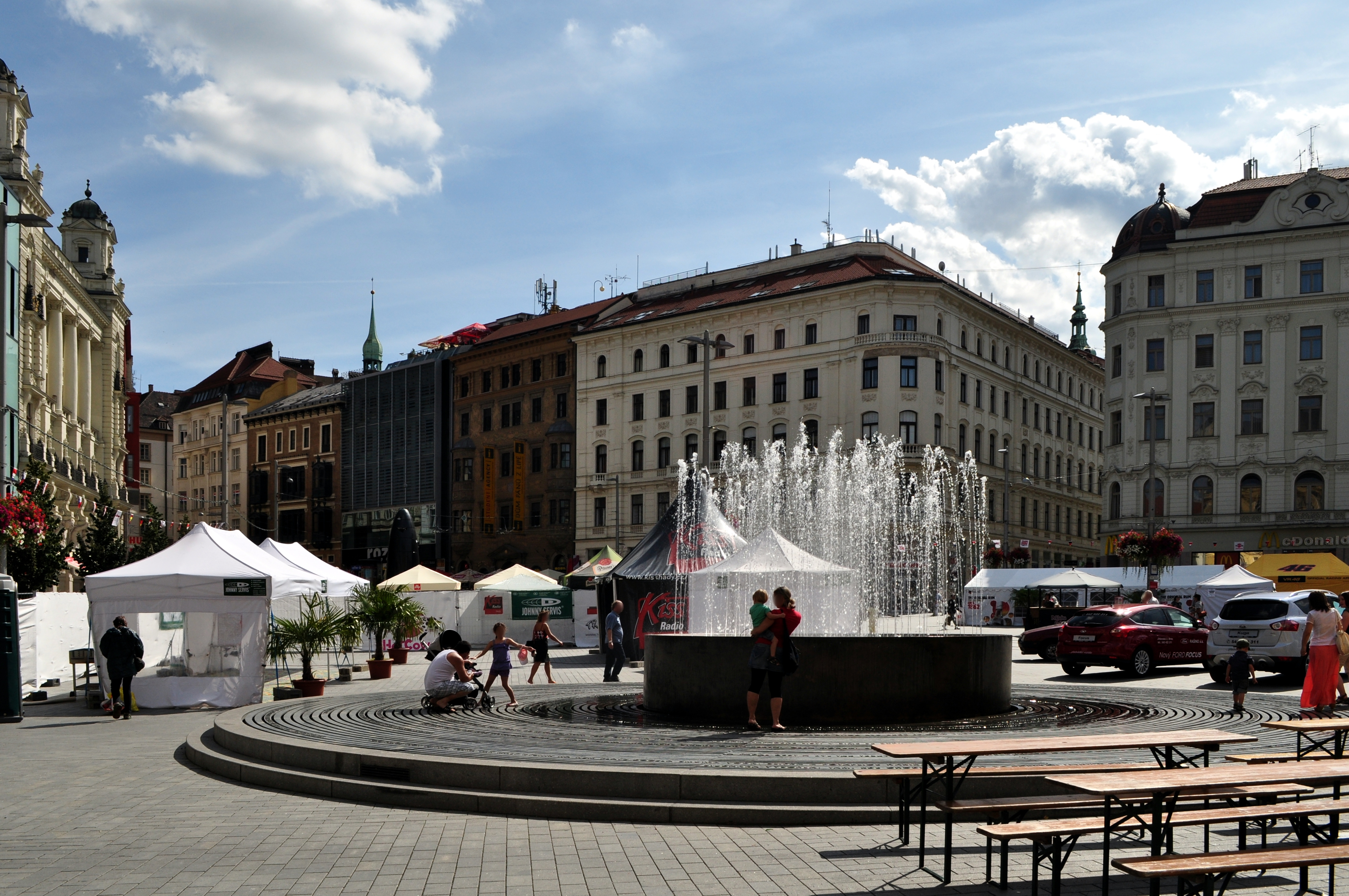
Liberty Square; in the Middle Ages, it was the main square.

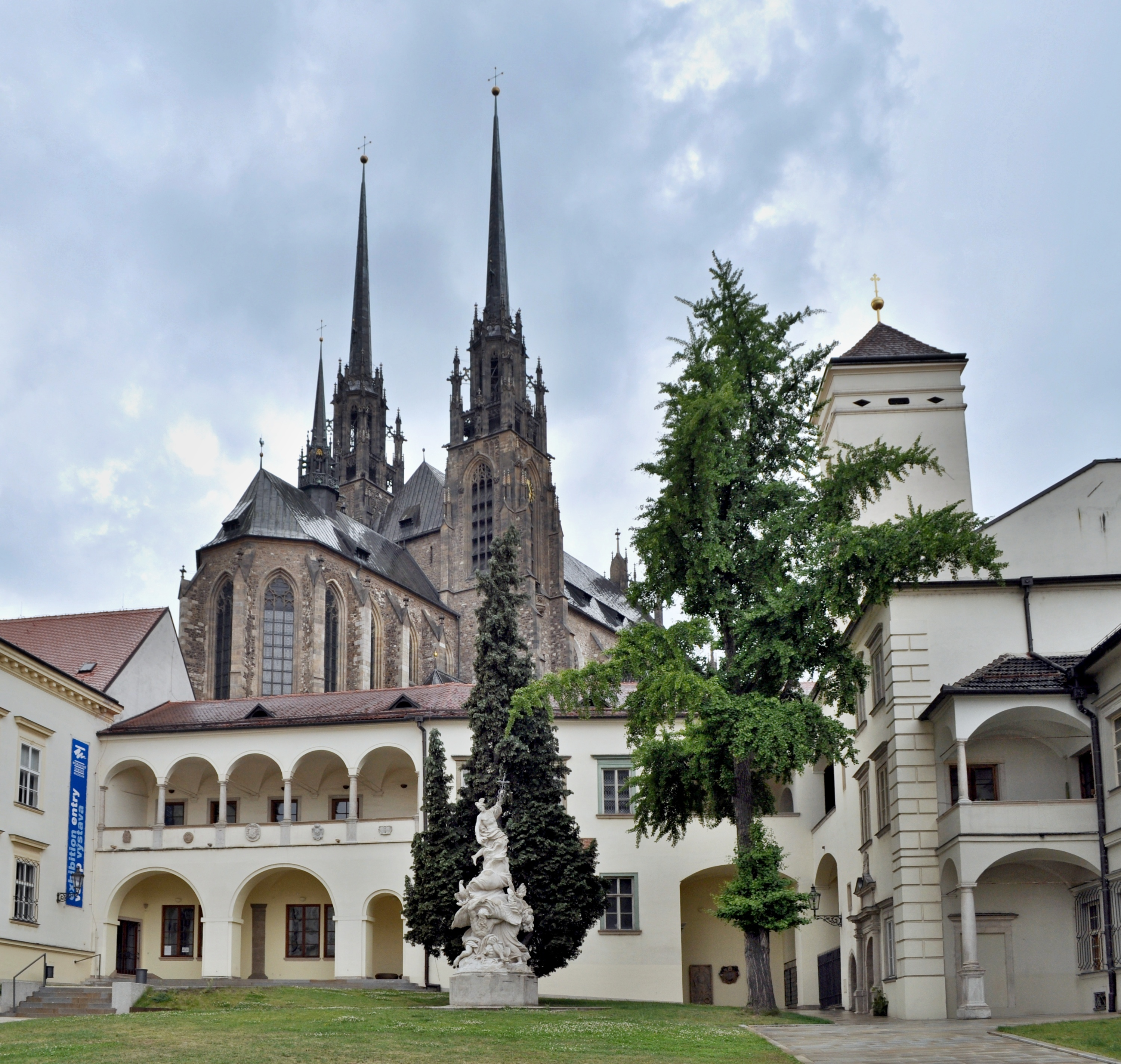
The Bishop's Palace towards the Cathedral

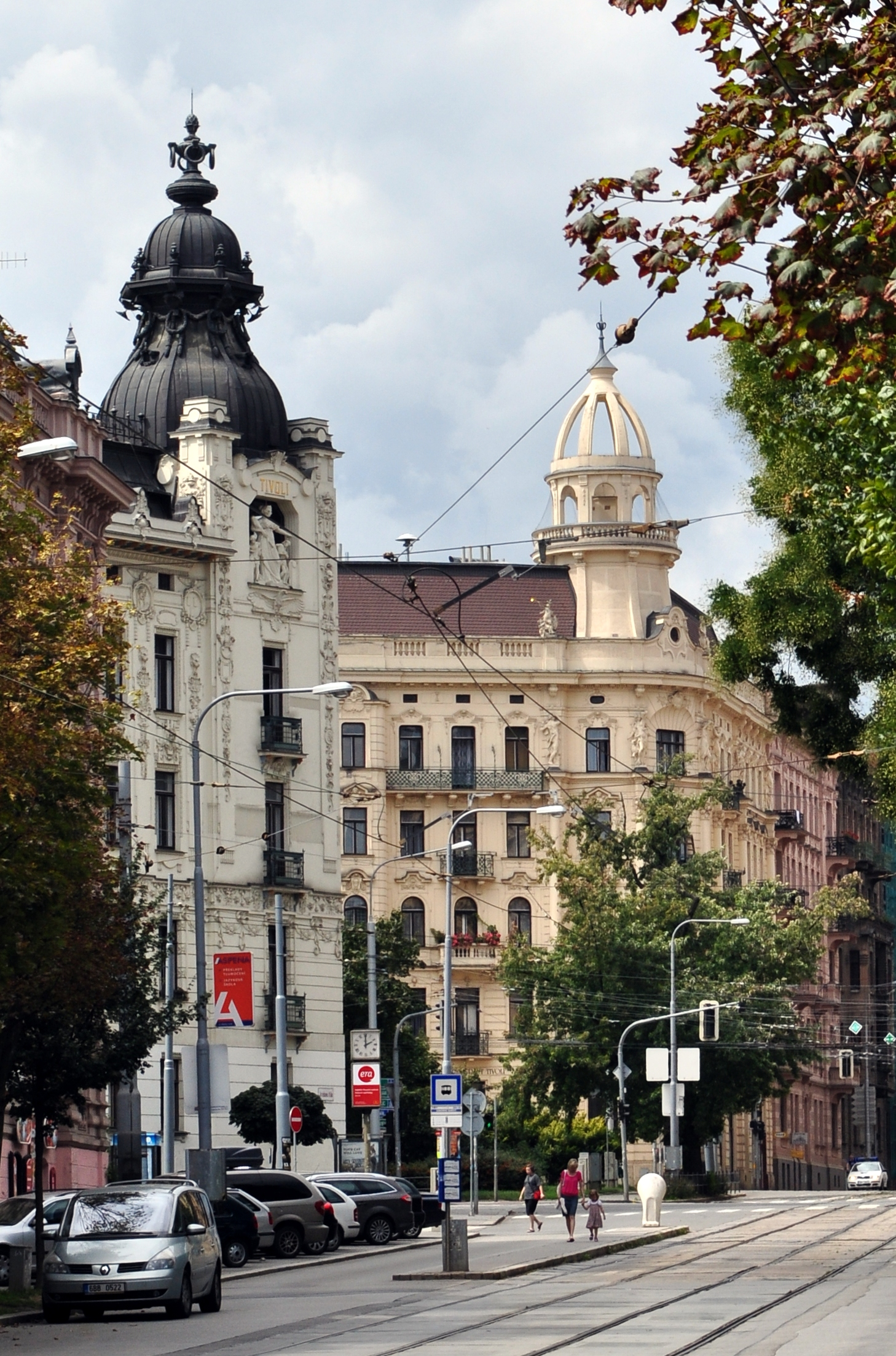
Tivoli

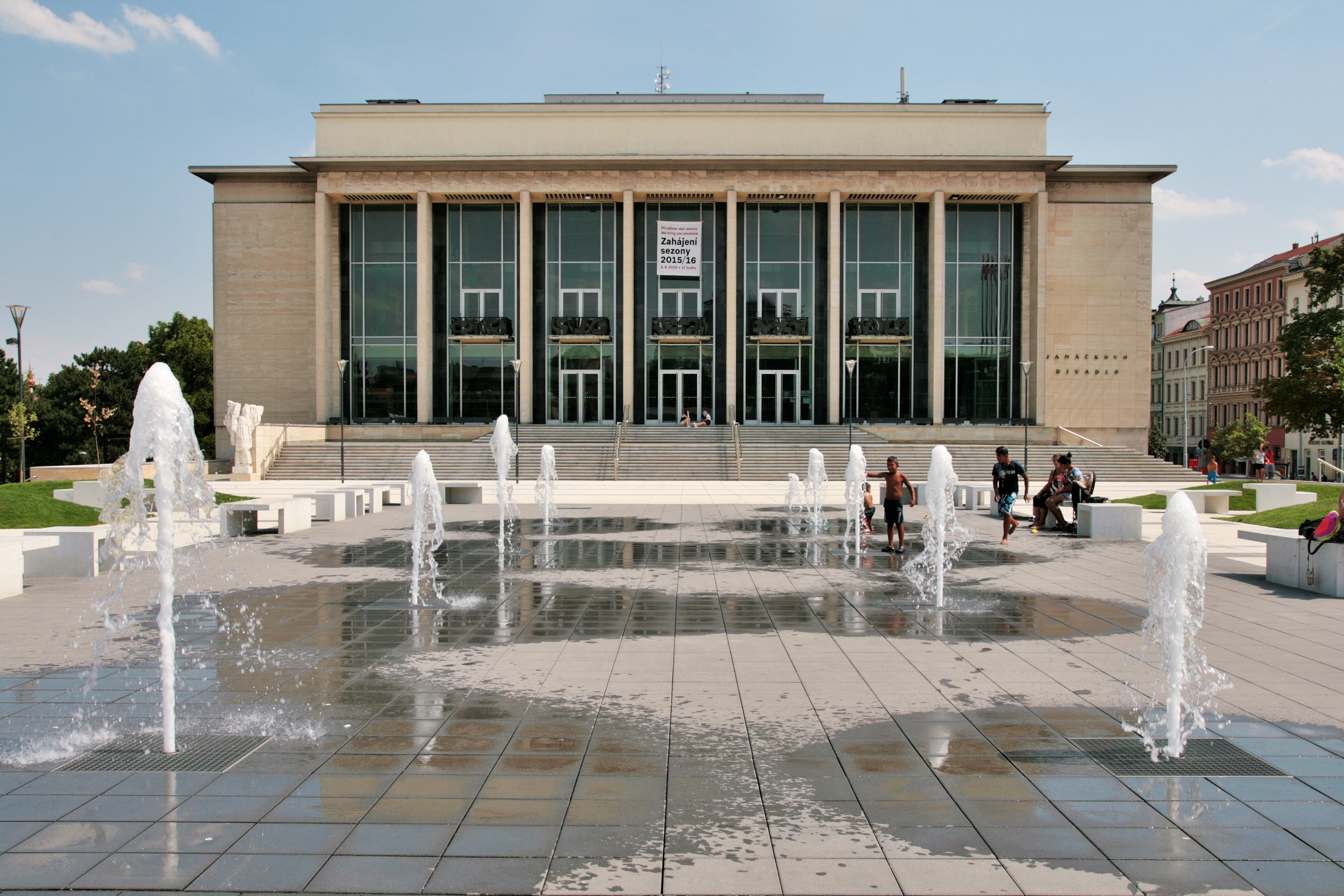
Janáček Theatre

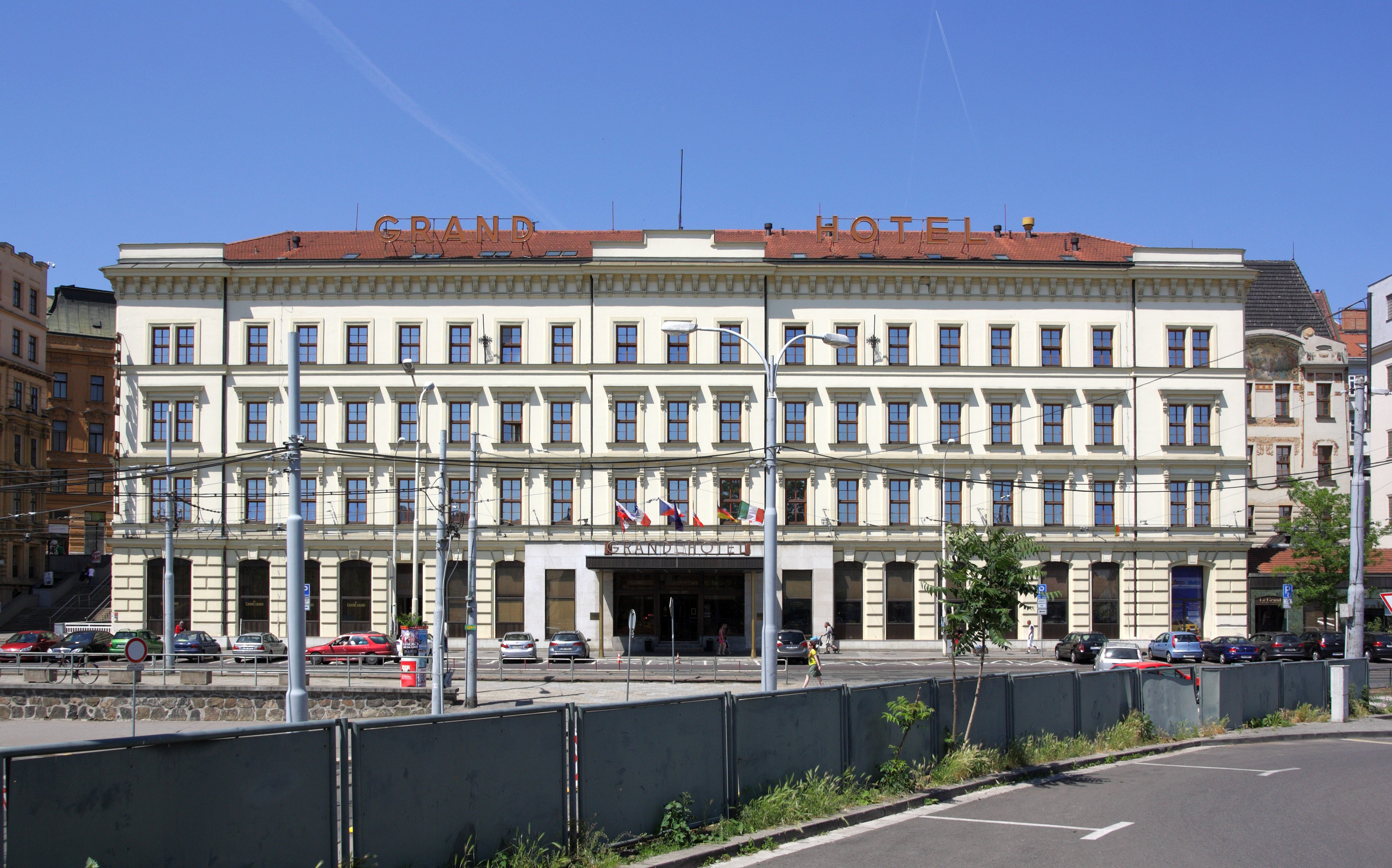
Hotel Grand

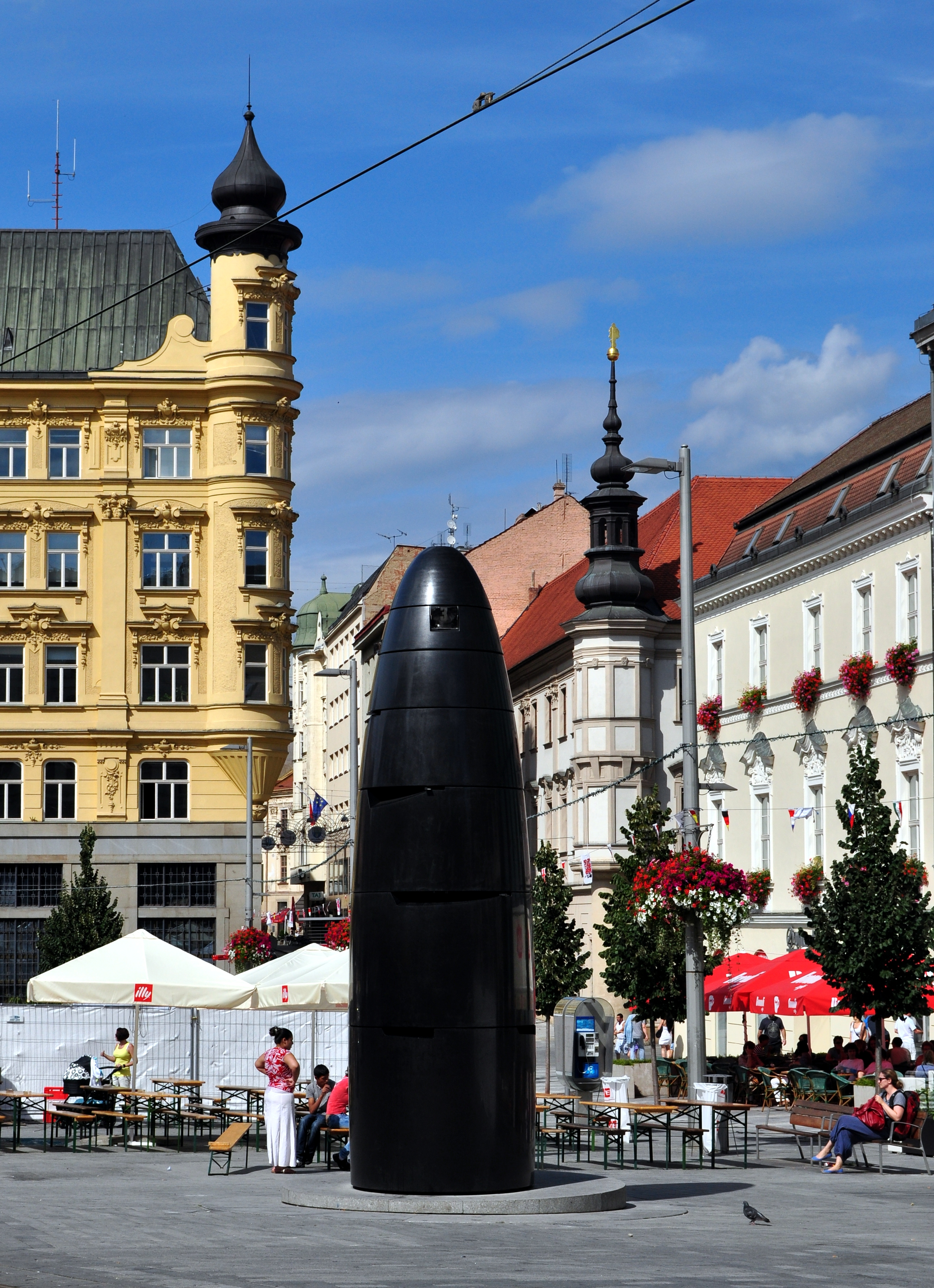
Brno astronomical clock

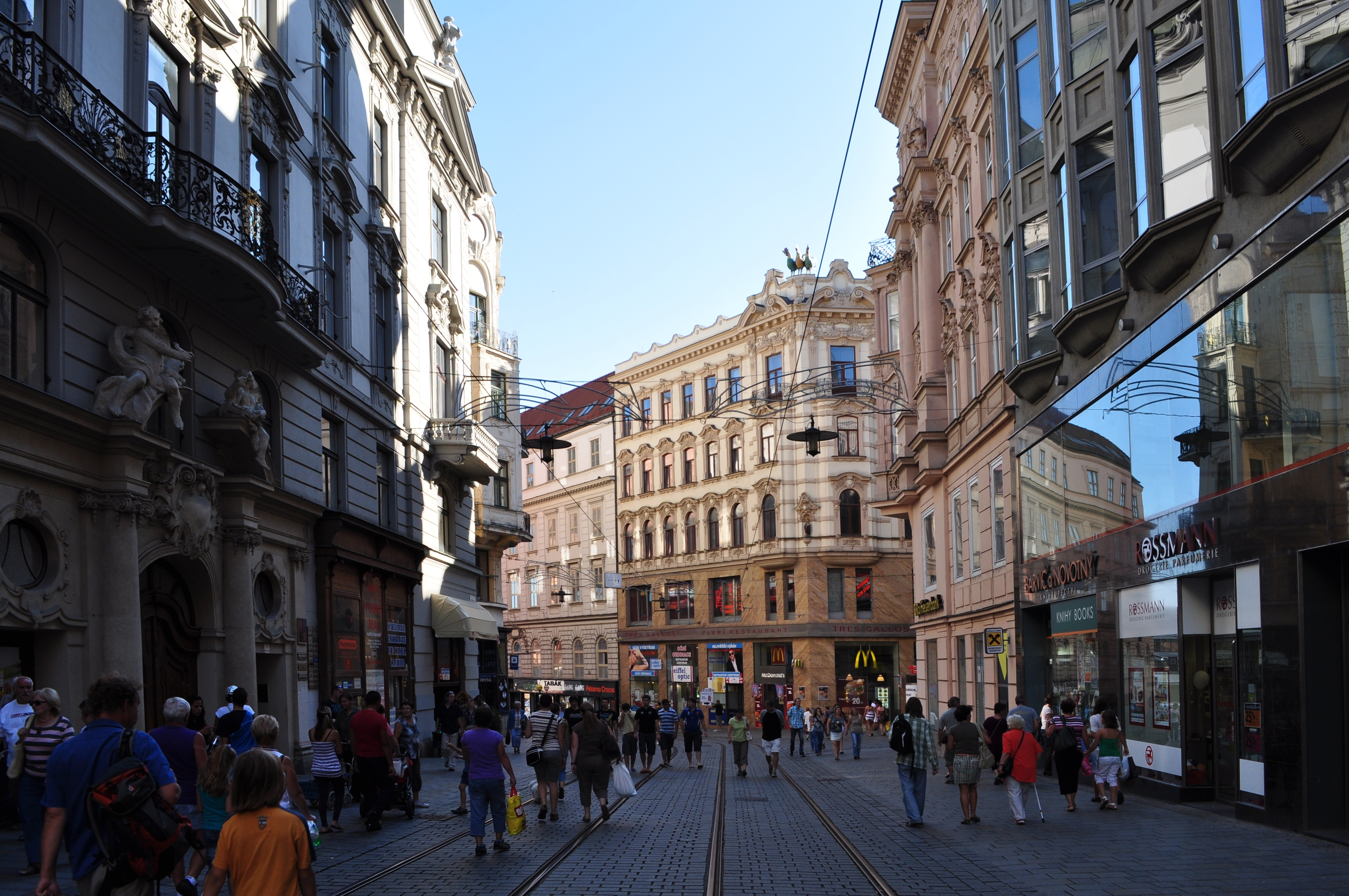
Masarykova Street

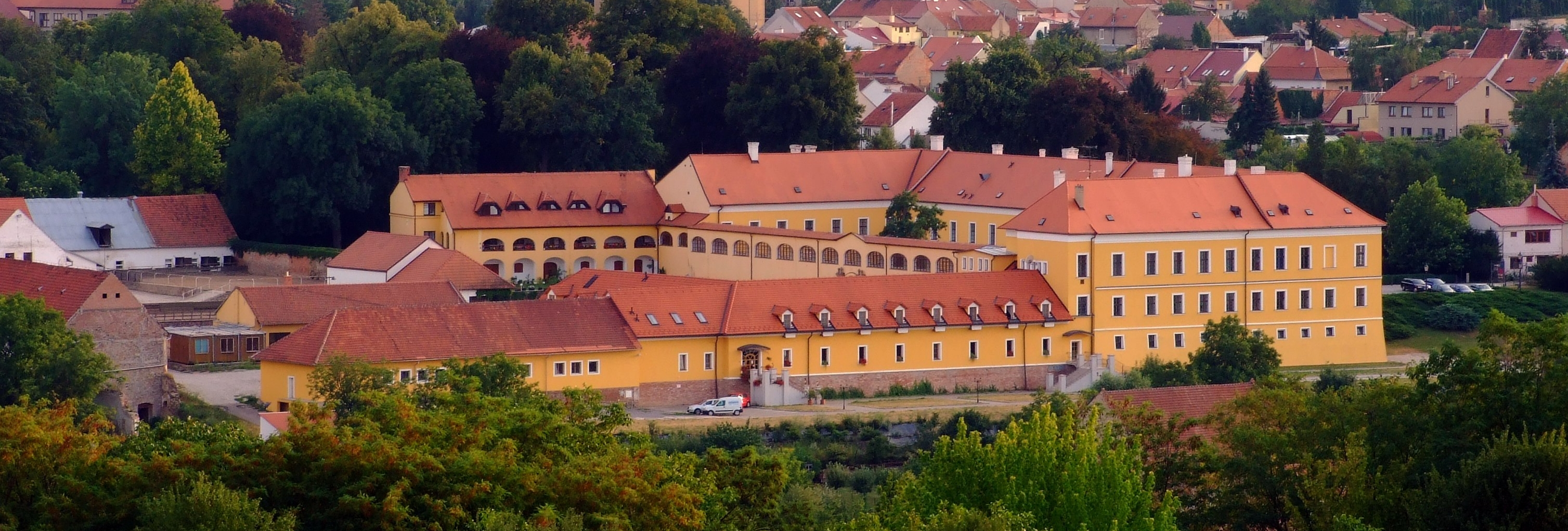
Líšeň Castle

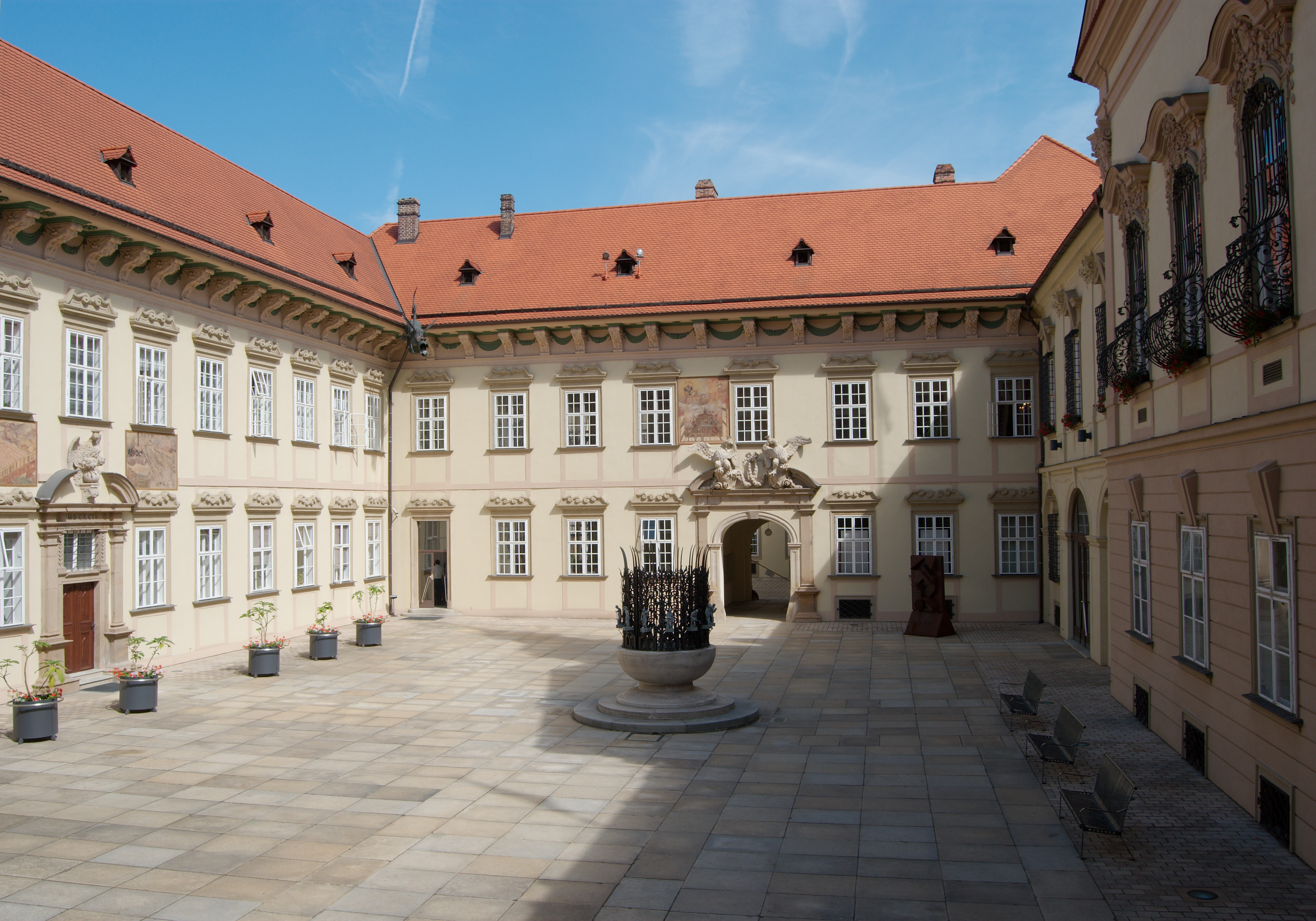
New Town Hall

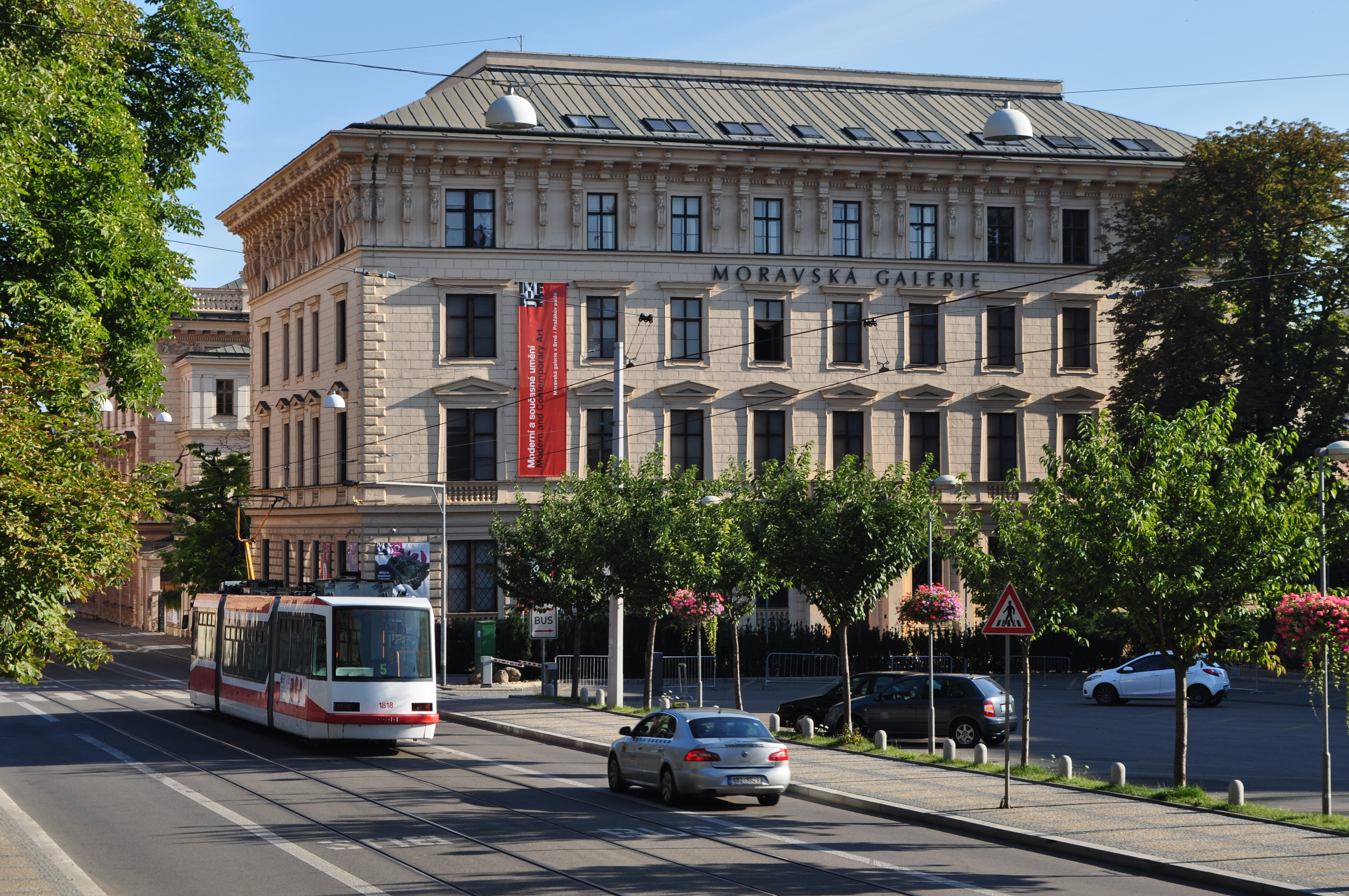
Moravian Gallery – Pražák Palace

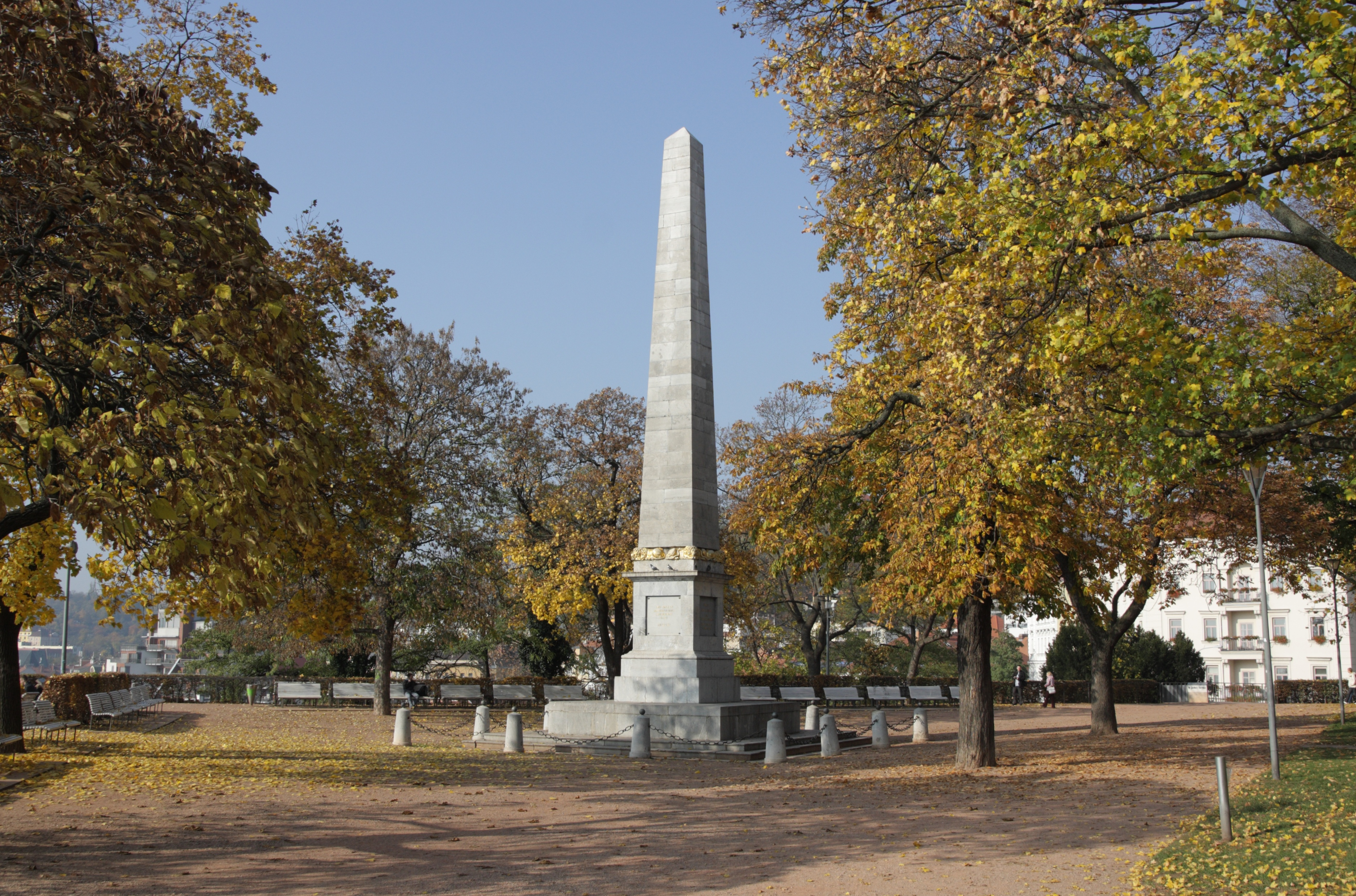
Denis Gardens with obelisk

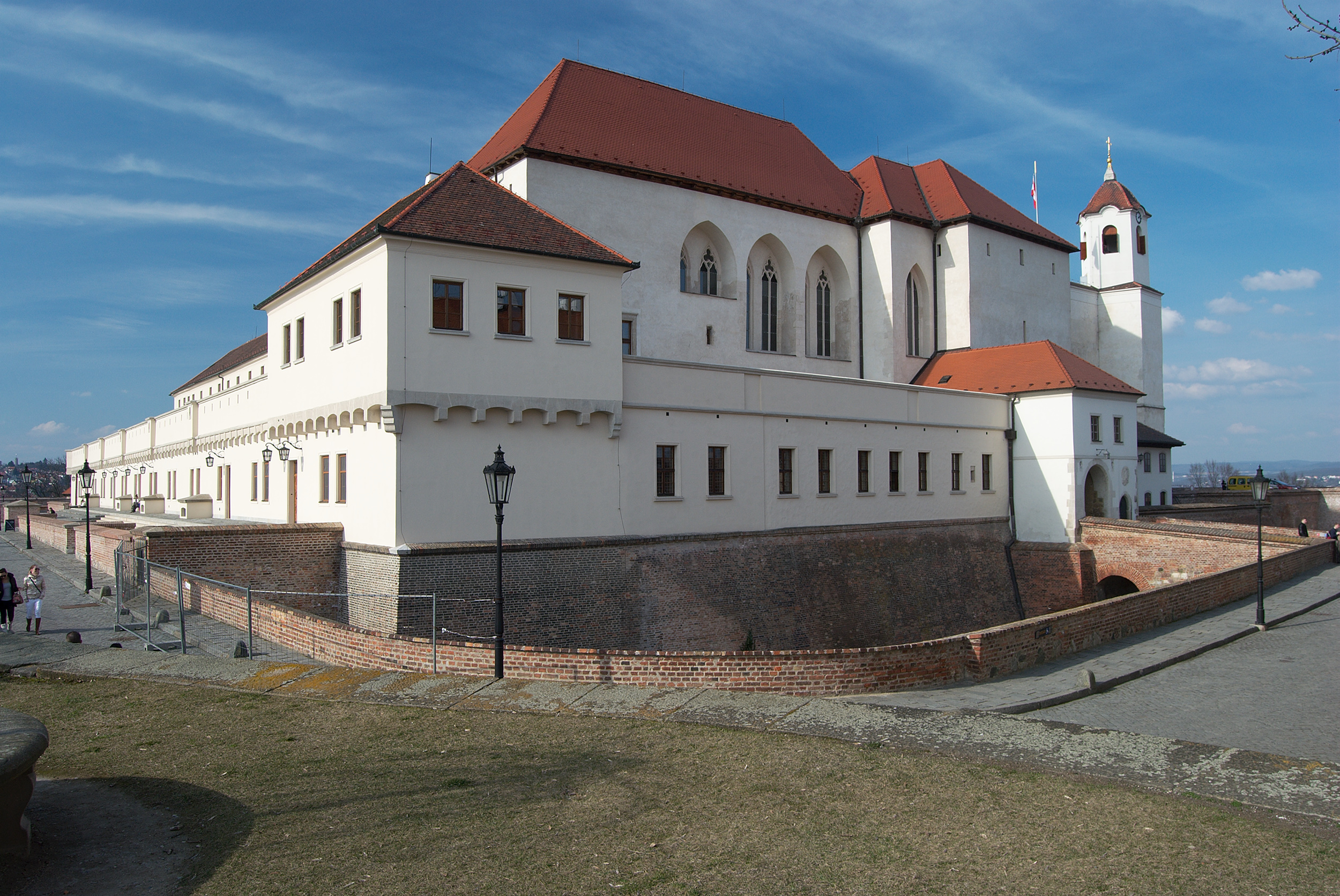
Špilberk Castle

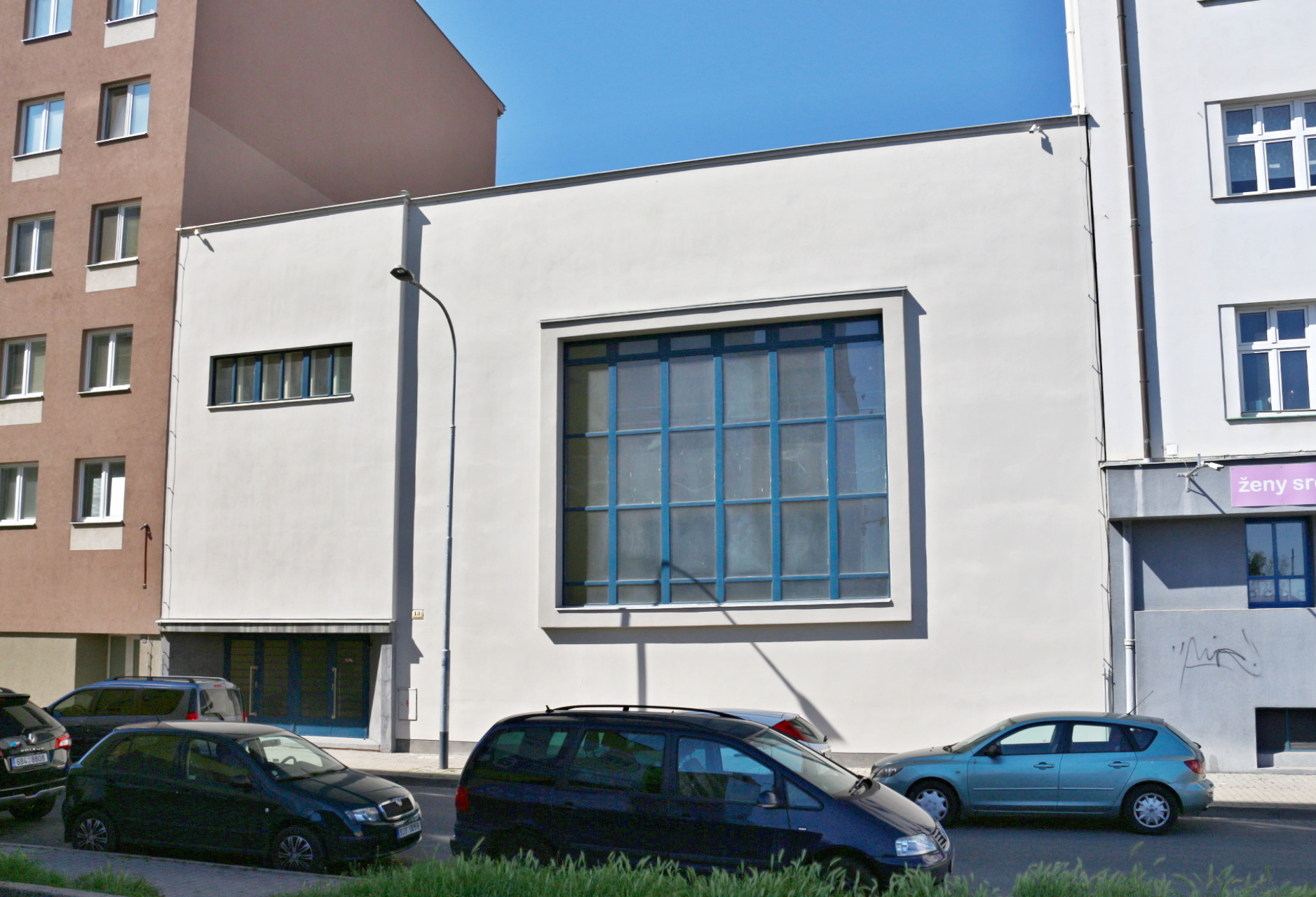
Functionalist Agudas Achim Synagogue by Otto Eisler

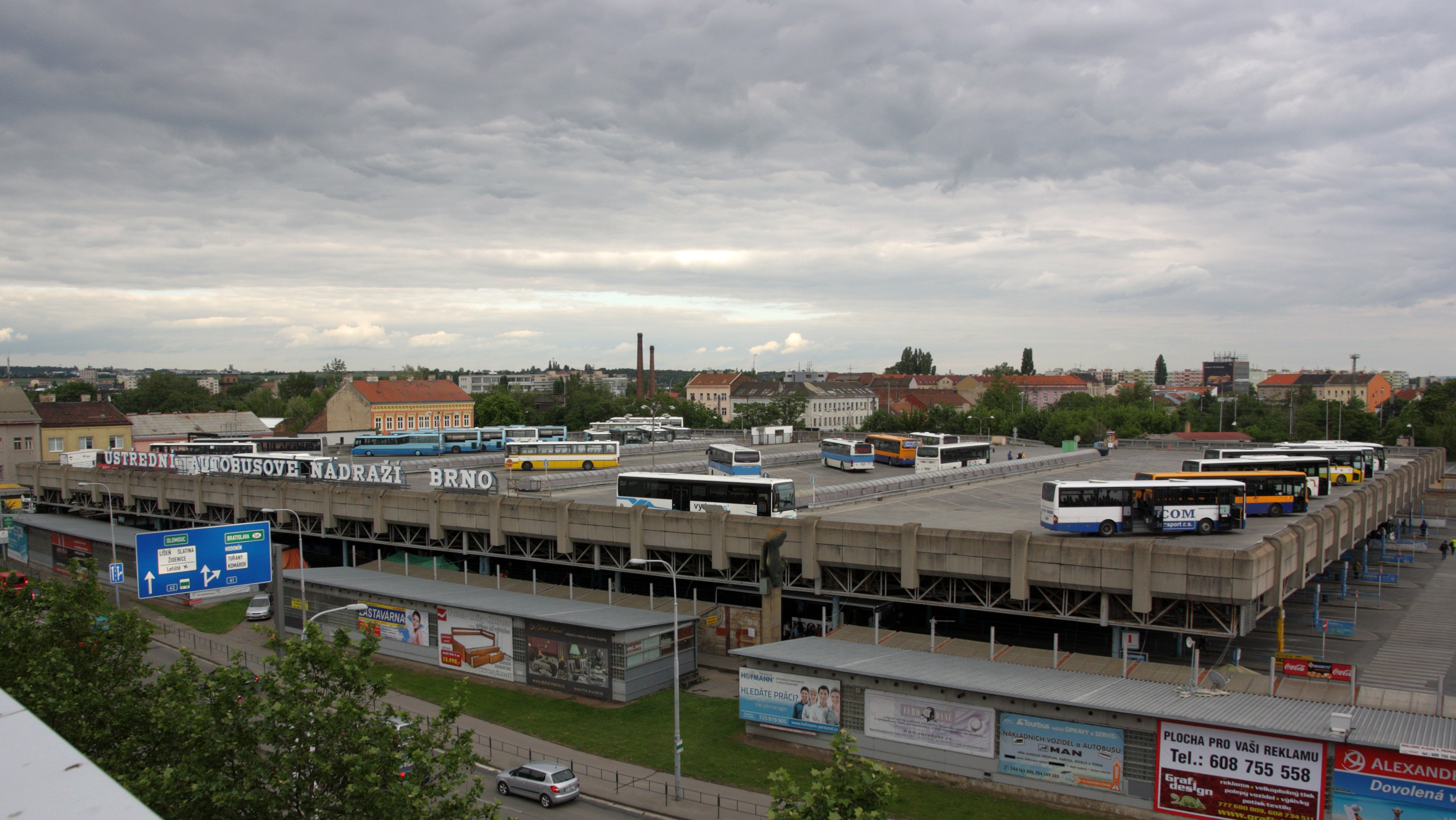
Central Bus Station

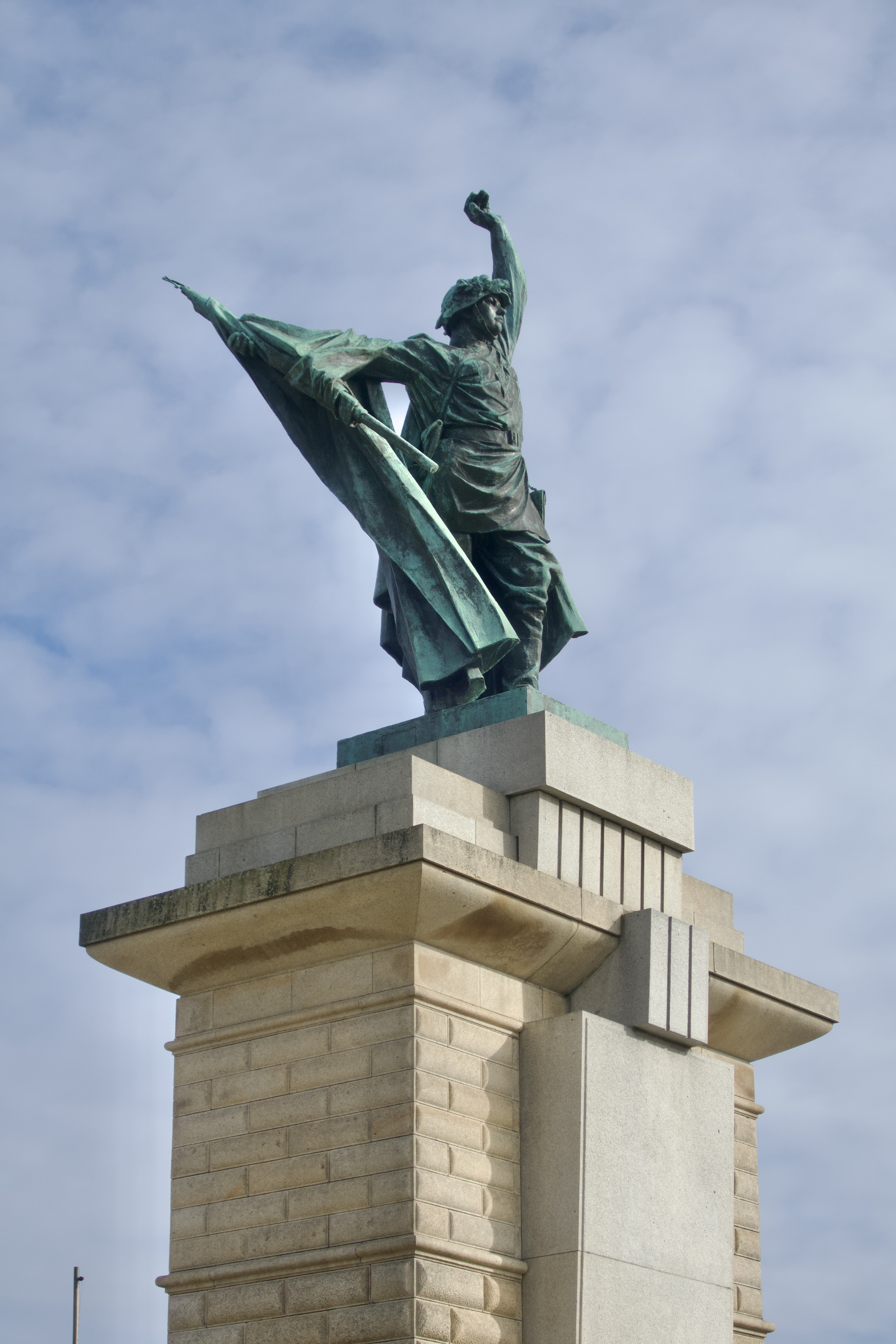
Red Army Statue - Park Moravské náměsti

== See also ==
- Churches of Brno

== Bibliography ==
- Henig, Robin Marantz (2000). The Monk in the Garden: The Lost and Found Genius of Gregor Mendel, the Father of Genetics. Boston: Houghton Mifflin. ISBN 978-0-395-97765-1.
- Gödel, Alois (2006). "Brünn 1679–1684". Brno: ITEM. ISBN 80-902297-8-6.
