= Brno metropolitan area =

Area of the Czech Republic

Brno metropolitan area Brněnská metropolitní oblast
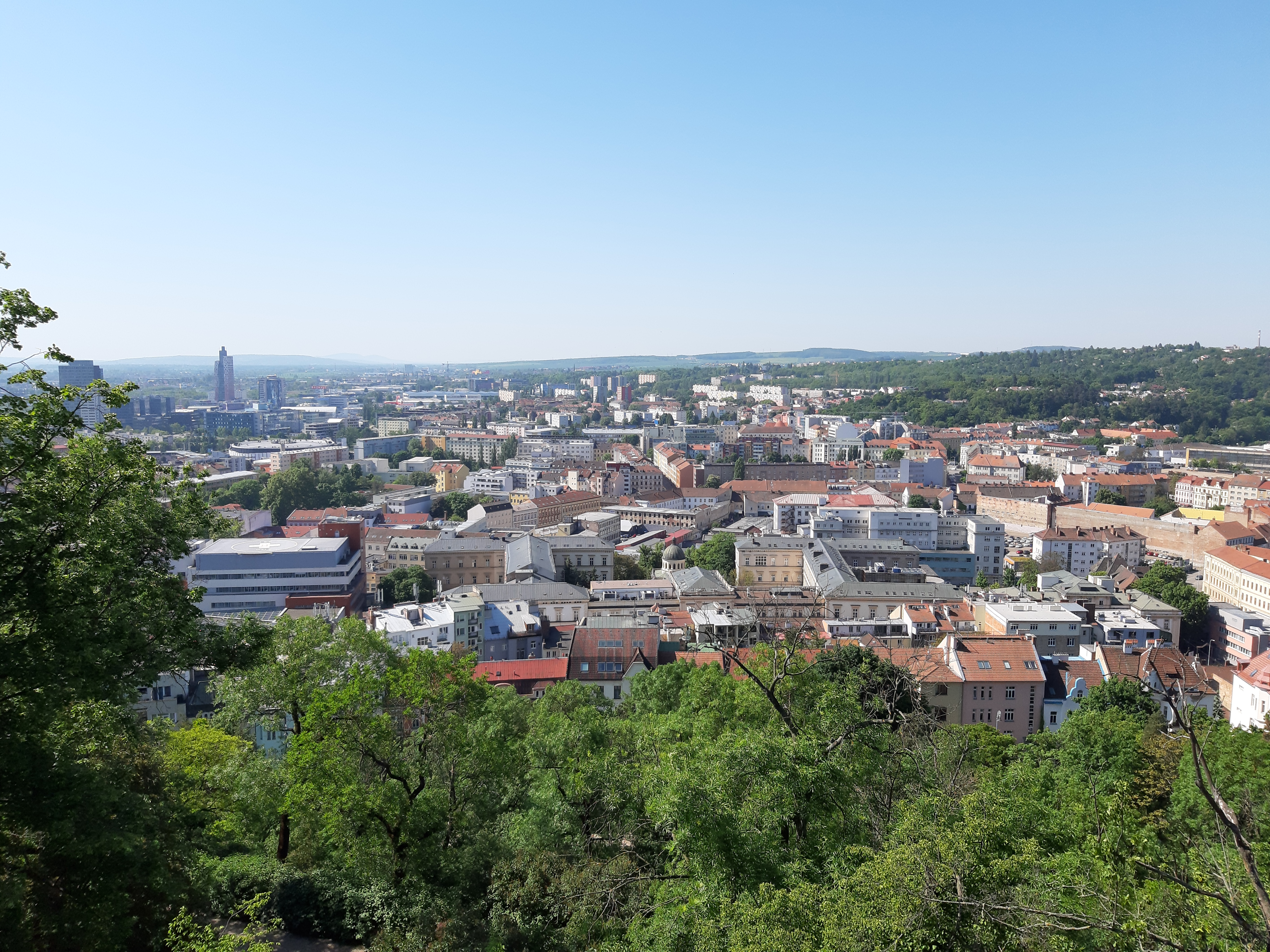
- View of Brno

- Brno metropolitan area, outlined in red
- Coordinates: 49°11′N 16°36′E
- Country: Czech Republic
- Region: South Moravian
- Largest city: Brno

Area
  - Total: 1,978 km^{2} (764 sq mi)

Population (2022)
  - Total: 734,109
  - Density: 371.1/km^{2} (961.2/sq mi)

GDP
  - Total: €30.334 billion (2022)
- Time zone: UTC+1 (CET)
  - Summer (DST): UTC+2 (CEST)

The Brno metropolitan area (Czech: Brněnská metropolitní oblast) is the metropolitan area of the city of Brno in the Czech Republic. The metropolitan area has a population of 729,405 as of 2024. The metropolitan area is the third most populous urban area in the country.

Covering an area of 1,978 km² in the South Moravian Region, it comprises Brno and 183 surrounding municipalities, with a total population of over 700,000 as of 2023. The aim of establishing the Brno Metropolitan Area is cooperation between municipalities in coordinating strategic projects in transportation, education, environment, and social services. This cooperation is made possible by the European Commission's ITI tool – Integrated Territorial Investments.

ITI serves to address metropolitan problems requiring an integrated approach and cooperation among all municipalities. The Brno Metropolitan Area is one of three metropolitan areas defined in the Czech Republic's Regional Development Strategy 2021+.

== History ==
During the First Republic era, Brno was administratively expanded in 1919 to include the cities of Královo Pole, Husovice, and 22 other municipalities. In 1983, the Brno Urban Regional Agglomeration was defined by a government resolution to establish urban regional agglomerations and urban regions. This was further delineated in the BSRA Urban Plan of 1985 and in subsequent studies and projects addressing noise assessment, metropolitan management, and agglomeration links.

In 2013, the functional area of the Brno Metropolitan Area was defined for the application of the ITI tool (Integrated Territorial Investments). In 2014, a Memorandum on Metropolitan Cooperation was signed between Brno and five municipalities, which was updated in 2018. In 2016, Brno joined the European METREX network, and in 2020, a new definition of the Brno Metropolitan Area was established for the period 2021+.

Significant projects include the URBACT II Joining Forces project in 2009, the international SPIMA project in 2017-2018, and the METRO project from 2020-2021. Additionally, Ivančice joined the Memorandum on Metropolitan Cooperation in 2020. The city's collaborative efforts aim to utilize European funding to tackle metropolitan issues through strategic and integrated projects.

Historical population
Year	Pop.	±%
1950	532,932	—
1961	577,911	+8.4%
1970	602,037	+4.2%
1980	644,714	+7.1%
1991	655,831	+1.7%
2001	646,440	−1.4%
2011	683,086	+5.7%
2021	718,189	+5.1%
Source: Censuses

== Municipalities ==
The metropolitan area has 184 municipalities.

Name	Population (2024)
Adamov	4,605
Babice nad Svitavou	1,439
Babice u Rosic	804
Bílovice nad Svitavou	3,739
Blansko	20,185
Blažovice	1,254
Blučina	2,295
Borkovany	838
Bošovice	1,259
Braníškov	213
Bratčice	671
Brno	400,566
Březina (former Blansko district)	1,109
Březina (former Tišnov district)	367
Bučovice	6,891
Bukovina	464
Bukovinka	641
Čebín	1,969
Černá Hora	2,141
Česká	1,008
Čučice	451
Dambořice	1,536
Deblín	1,133
Dolní Kounice	2,571
Domašov	683
Drásov	2,099
Dražovice	951
Drnovice	2,368
Habrovany	920
Habrůvka	418
Hajany	697
Heroltice	238
Heršpice	920
Hlína	319
Hodějice	1,105
Holasice	1,384
Holubice	1,766
Hostěnice	847
Hostěrádky-Rešov	834
Hradčany	680
Hrušky	756
Hrušovany u Brna	3,588
Hvozdec	358
Chudčice	1,032
Ivaň	811
Ivančice	9,971
Javůrek	366
Jedovnice	2,982
Jinačovice	807
Jiříkovice	983
Kanice	1,104
Ketkovice	629
Klobouky u Brna	2,501
Kobeřice u Brna	715
Kobylnice	1,199
Komořany	756
Kovalovice	678
Krasová	484
Kratochvilka	477
Křenovice	2,057
Křižanovice	870
Křtiny	820
Kupařovice	389
Kuřim	11,400
Lažánky	878
Lažany	453
Ledce	259
Lelekovice	1,986
Lesní Hluboké	273
Lipůvka	1,486
Litostrov	133
Lovčičky	738
Luleč	989
Malešovice	829
Malhostovice	1,030
Maršov	532
Medlov	898
Mělčany	492
Měnín	1,869
Milešovice	711
Modřice	5,656
Mokrá-Horákov	2,880
Moravany	3,497
Moravské Bránice	972
Moravské Knínice	1,152
Mouřínov	483
Moutnice	1,168
Nebovidy	854
Němčany	827
Němčičky	332
Nemojany	830
Neslovice	994
Nesvačilka	333
Nížkovice	789
Nosislav	1,385
Nové Bránice	938
Ochoz u Brna	1,554
Olomučany	1,084
Olšany	647
Omice	840
Opatovice	1,162
Ořechov	2,877
Oslavany	4,871
Ostopovice	1,737
Ostrovačice	888
Otmarov	392
Otnice	1,591
Podbřežice	267
Podolí	1,439
Pohořelice	6,071
Ponětovice	448
Popovice	366
Popůvky	1,809
Pozořice	2,399
Prace	977
Pravlov	675
Prštice	981
Předklášteří	1,461
Přibice	1,085
Příbram na Moravě	644
Přibyslavice	544
Přísnotice	886
Radostice	787
Ráječko	1,363
Rajhrad	4,070
Rajhradice	1,608
Rašovice	704
Rebešovice	1,098
Rosice	6,738
Rostěnice-Zvonovice	610
Rousínov	5,962
Rozdrojovice	1,081
Rudice	983
Rudka	405
Řícmanice	835
Říčany	2,140
Říčky	423
Senetářov	592
Sentice	667
Silůvky	852
Sivice	1,112
Slavkov u Brna	7,169
Sobotovice	641
Sokolnice	2,432
Střelice	3,258
Svinošice	395
Syrovice	2,066
Šaratice	1,065
Šebrov-Kateřina	830
Šitbořice	2,137
Šlapanice	7,952
Telnice	1,668
Těšany	1,296
Tetčice	1,130
Tišnov	9,275
Trboušany	437
Troubsko	2,432
Tučapy	624
Tvarožná	1,342
Uhřice	771
Újezd u Brna	3,388
Unkovice	721
Vážany nad Litavou	759
Velatice	766
Velešovice	1,269
Velké Hostěrádky	498
Veverská Bítýška	3,526
Veverské Knínice	991
Viničné Šumice	1,370
Vohančice	199
Vojkovice	1,213
Vranov	904
Vranovice	2,448
Všechovice	264
Vysoké Popovice	754
Vyškov	20,498
Zastávka	2,522
Zbraslav	1,277
Zbýšov	3,680
Zbýšov	730
Žabčice	1,661
Žatčany	947
Želešice	1,945
Židlochovice	3,673
Total	729,405
