= Žabčice =

- Municipality
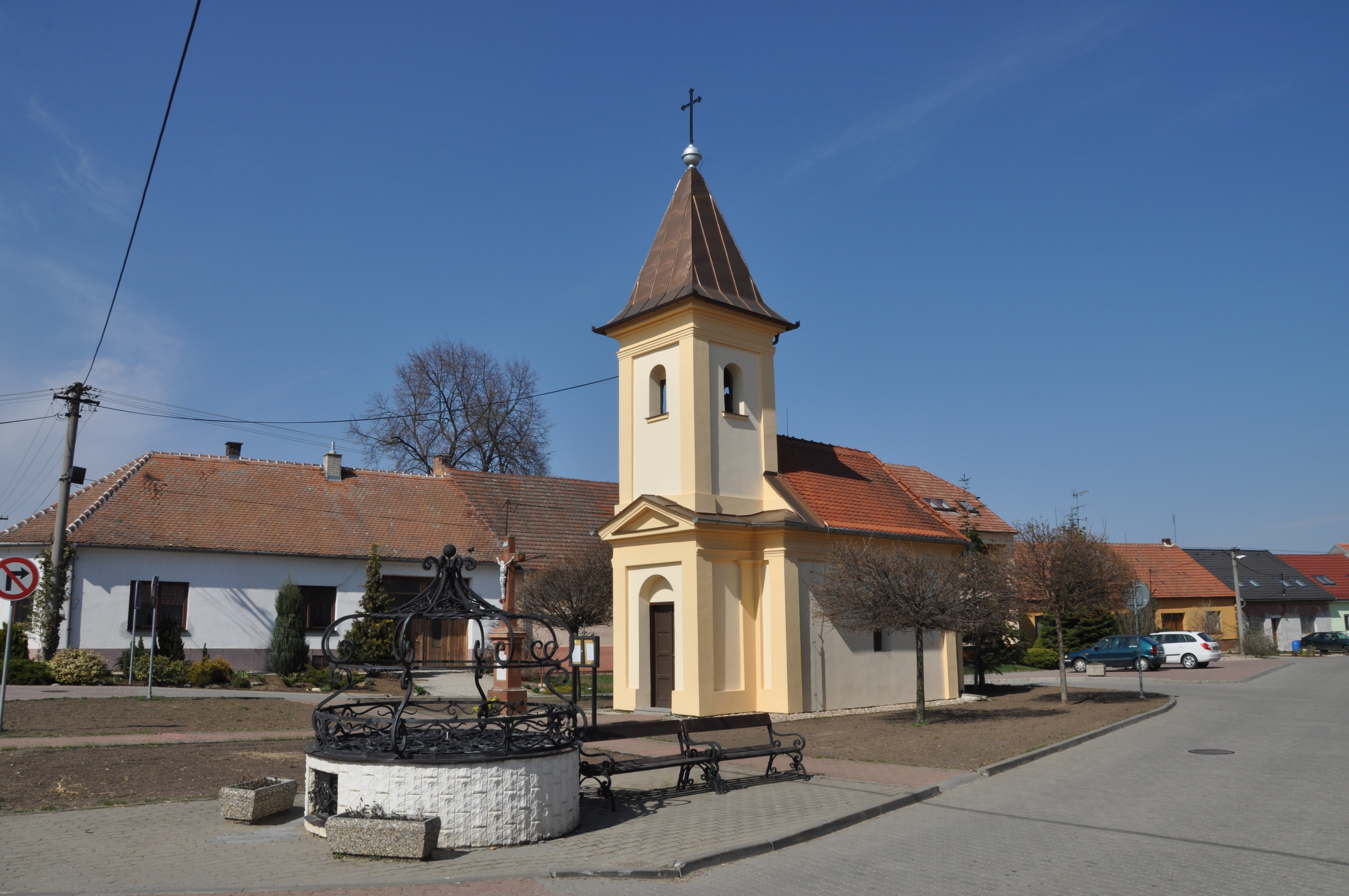
- Chapel of Saint Lawrence

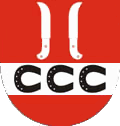
- Flag Coat of arms

- Location in the Czech Republic
- Coordinates: 49°0′42″N 16°36′9″E
- Country: Czech Republic
- Region: South Moravian
- District: Brno-Country
- First mentioned: 1356

Area
  - Total: 8.18 km^{2} (3.16 sq mi)
- Elevation: 182 m (597 ft)

Population (2026-01-01)
  - Total: 1,665
  - Density: 204/km^{2} (527/sq mi)
- Time zone: UTC+1 (CET)
  - Summer (DST): UTC+2 (CEST)
- Postal code: 664 63
- Website: www.zabcice.cz

Žabčice is a municipality and village in Brno-Country District in the South Moravian Region of the Czech Republic. It has about 1,700 inhabitants.

Žabčice lies approximately 20 kilometres (12 mi) south of Brno and 197 km (122 mi) south-east of Prague.

== Demographics ==
Historical population
Year	Pop.	±%
1869	692	—
1880	661	−4.5%
1890	744	+12.6%
1900	792	+6.5%
1910	788	−0.5%
1921	855	+8.5%
1930	1,044	+22.1%
1950	1,138	+9.0%
1961	1,321	+16.1%
1970	1,344	+1.7%
1980	1,424	+6.0%
1991	1,408	−1.1%
2001	1,460	+3.7%
2011	1,591	+9.0%
2021	1,574	−1.1%
Source: Censuses
