= Nesvačilka =

- Municipality
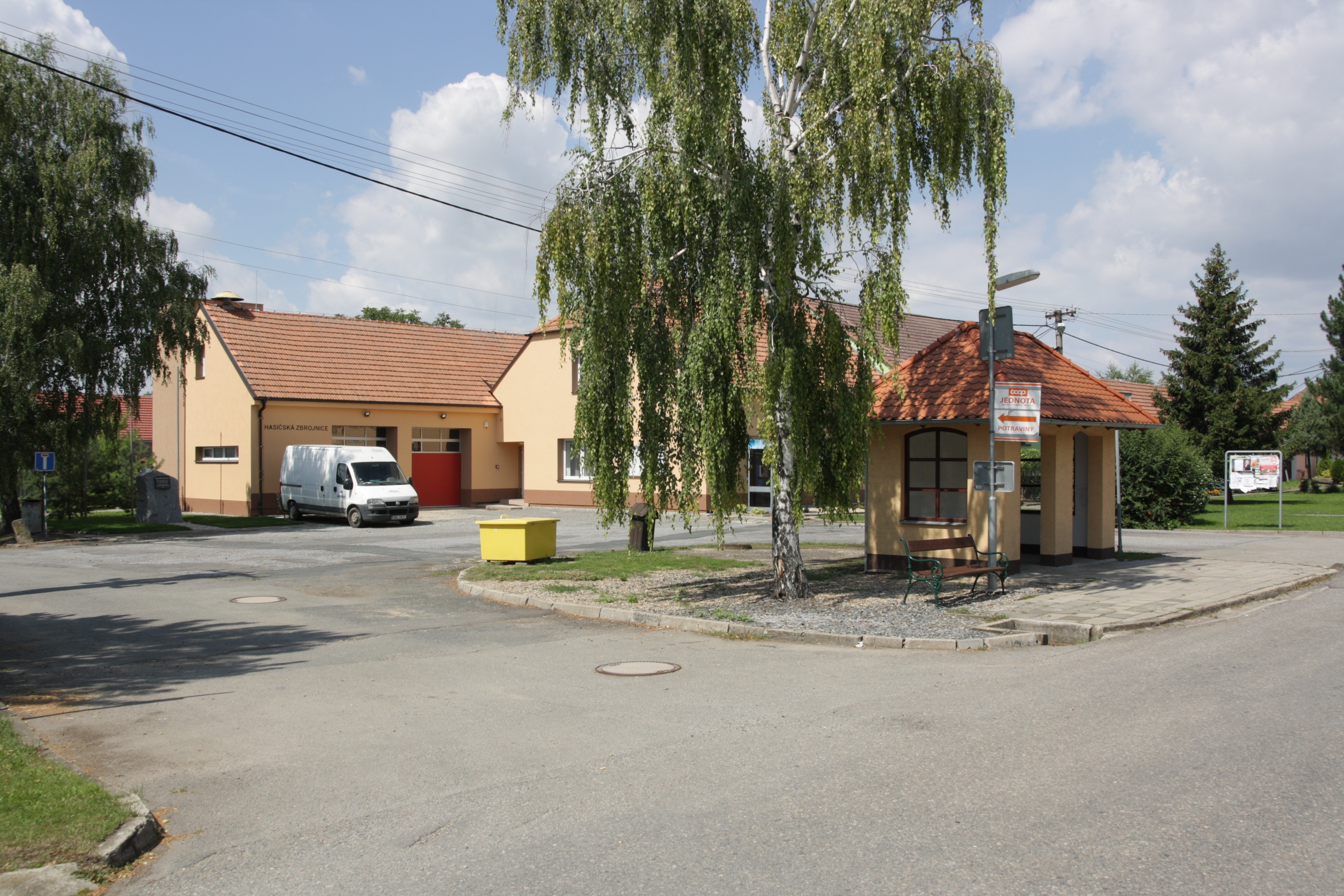
- Centre of Nesvačilka

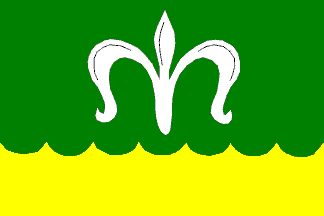
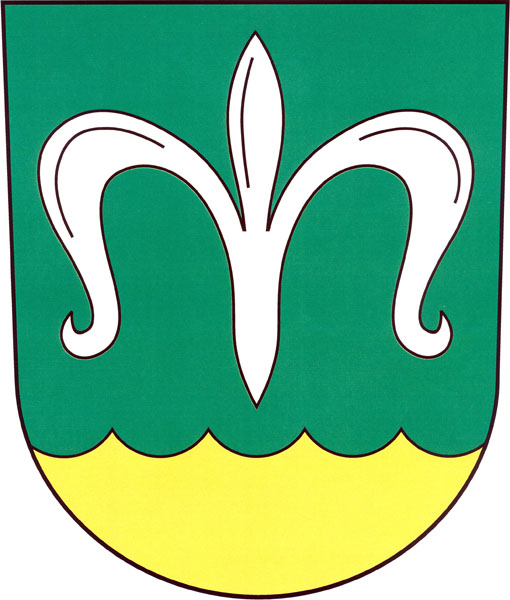
- Flag Coat of arms

- Location in the Czech Republic
- Coordinates: 49°3′51″N 16°45′14″E
- Country: Czech Republic
- Region: South Moravian
- District: Brno-Country
- Founded: 1715

Area
  - Total: 2.70 km^{2} (1.04 sq mi)
- Elevation: 198 m (650 ft)

Population (2026-01-01)
  - Total: 324
  - Density: 120/km^{2} (311/sq mi)
- Time zone: UTC+1 (CET)
  - Summer (DST): UTC+2 (CEST)
- Postal code: 664 54
- Website: www.nesvacilka.cz

Nesvačilka is a municipality and village in Brno-Country District in the South Moravian Region of the Czech Republic. It has about 300 inhabitants.

Nesvačilka lies approximately 19 kilometres (12 mi) south-east of Brno and 204 km (127 mi) south-east of Prague.

== Demographics ==
Historical population
Year	Pop.	±%
1869	319	—
1880	363	+13.8%
1890	358	−1.4%
1900	338	−5.6%
1910	386	+14.2%
1921	395	+2.3%
1930	422	+6.8%
1950	351	−16.8%
1961	394	+12.3%
1970	355	−9.9%
1980	333	−6.2%
1991	320	−3.9%
2001	333	+4.1%
2011	297	−10.8%
2021	306	+3.0%
Source: Censuses
