= Přibyslavice (Brno-Country District) =

- Municipality
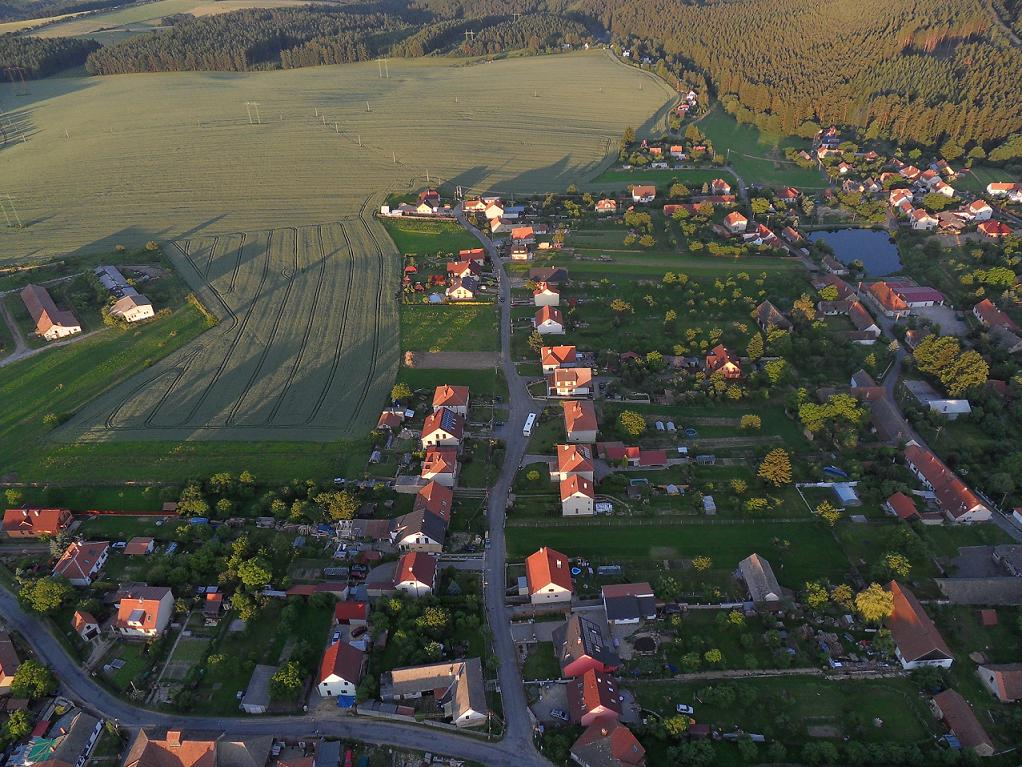
- Aerial view

- Flag Coat of arms

- Location in the Czech Republic
- Coordinates: 49°16′43″N 16°15′59″E
- Country: Czech Republic
- Region: South Moravian
- District: Brno-Country
- First mentioned: 1175

Area
  - Total: 8.52 km^{2} (3.29 sq mi)
- Elevation: 497 m (1,631 ft)

Population (2026-01-01)
  - Total: 554
  - Density: 65.0/km^{2} (168/sq mi)
- Time zone: UTC+1 (CET)
  - Summer (DST): UTC+2 (CEST)
- Postal code: 664 83
- Website: www.pribyslavice.net

Přibyslavice is a municipality and village in Brno-Country District in the South Moravian Region of the Czech Republic. It has about 600 inhabitants.

Přibyslavice lies approximately 27 kilometres (17 mi) west of Brno and 161 km (100 mi) south-east of Prague.

== Administrative division ==
Přibyslavice consists of two municipal parts (in brackets population according to the 2021 census):

- Přibyslavice (467)
- Radoškov (67)

== History ==
The first written mention of Přibyslavice is from 1175.

== Demographics ==
Historical population
Year	Pop.	±%
1869	860	—
1880	966	+12.3%
1890	807	−16.5%
1900	797	−1.2%
1910	756	−5.1%
1921	811	+7.3%
1930	740	−8.8%
1950	631	−14.7%
1961	646	+2.4%
1970	563	−12.8%
1980	437	−22.4%
1991	422	−3.4%
2001	415	−1.7%
2011	463	+11.6%
2021	534	+15.3%
Source: Censuses
