= Hvozdec (Brno-Country District) =

- Municipality
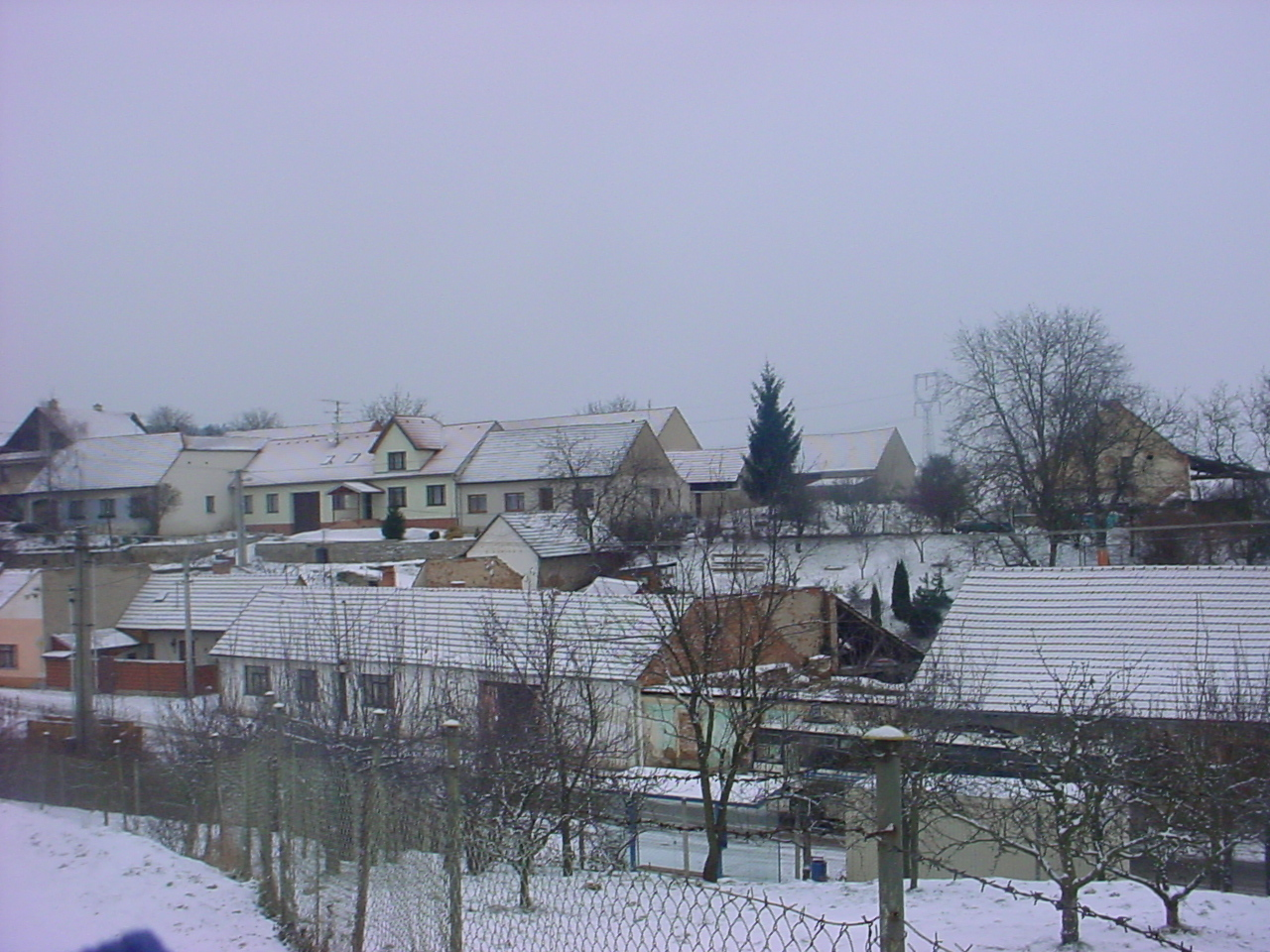
- View from the southeast

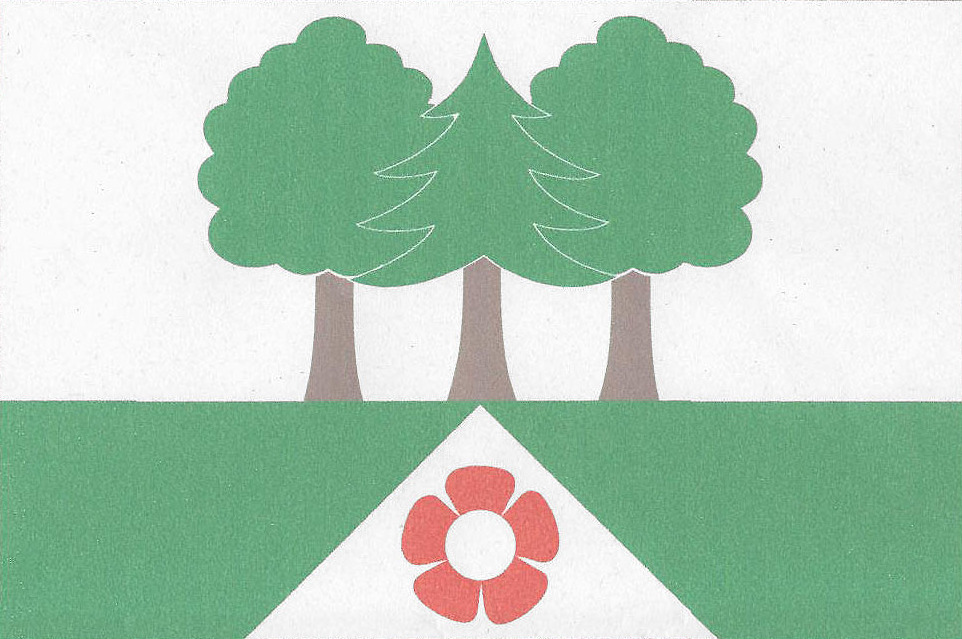
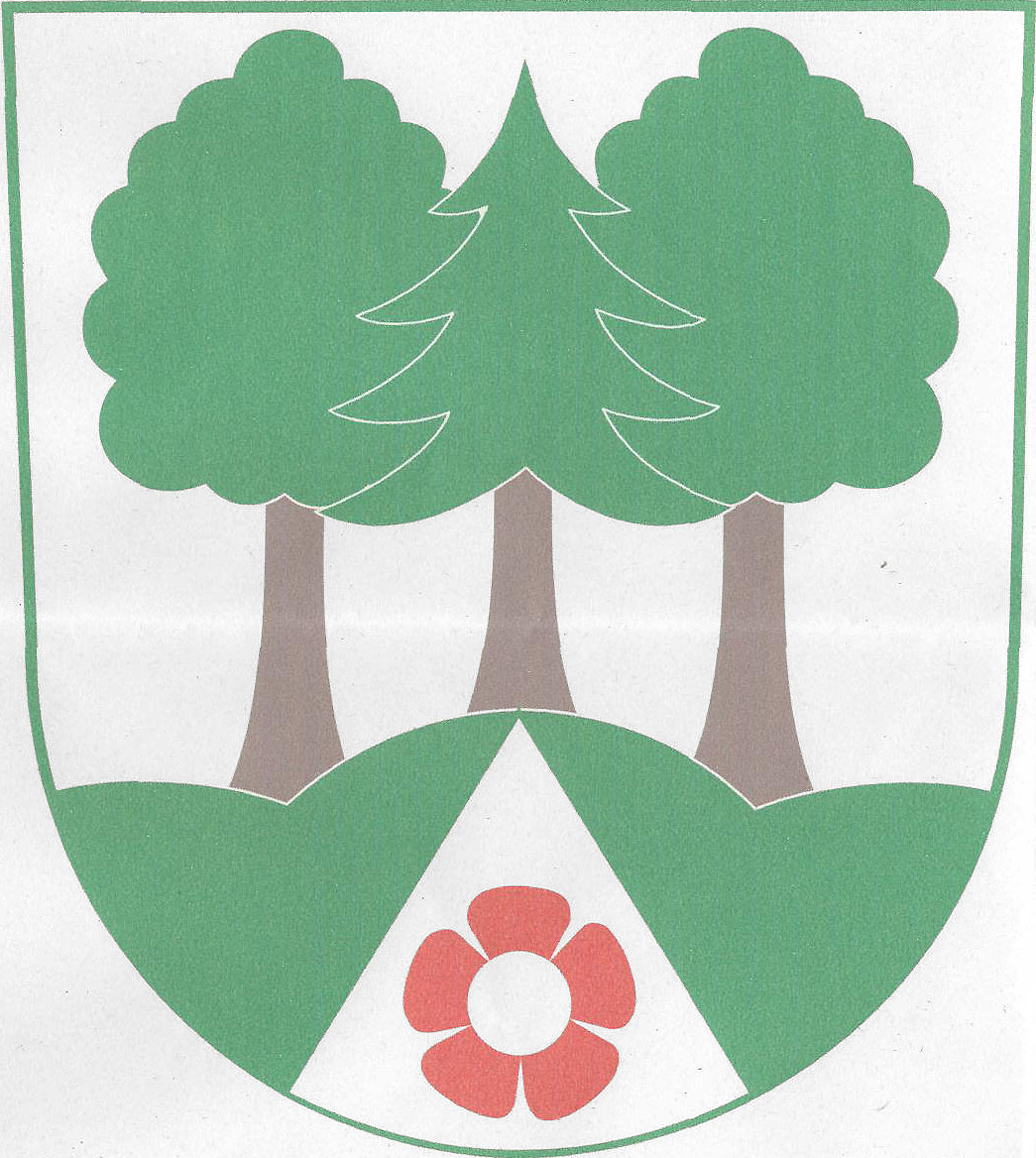
- Flag Coat of arms

- Location in the Czech Republic
- Coordinates: 49°14′49″N 16°25′31″E
- Country: Czech Republic
- Region: South Moravian
- District: Brno-Country
- First mentioned: 1317

Area
  - Total: 3.64 km^{2} (1.41 sq mi)
- Elevation: 305 m (1,001 ft)

Population (2026-01-01)
  - Total: 350
  - Density: 96/km^{2} (250/sq mi)
- Time zone: UTC+1 (CET)
  - Summer (DST): UTC+2 (CEST)
- Postal code: 664 71
- Website: hvozdec.cz

Hvozdec is a municipality and village in Brno-Country District in the South Moravian Region of the Czech Republic. It has about 400 inhabitants.

Hvozdec lies approximately 15 kilometres (9 mi) west of Brno and 172 km (107 mi) south-east of Prague.

== Demographics ==
Historical population
Year	Pop.	±%
1869	346	—
1880	347	+0.3%
1890	318	−8.4%
1900	319	+0.3%
1910	338	+6.0%
1921	330	−2.4%
1930	330	+0.0%
1950	285	−13.6%
1961	289	+1.4%
1970	263	−9.0%
1980	243	−7.6%
1991	189	−22.2%
2001	205	+8.5%
2011	258	+25.9%
2021	346	+34.1%
Source: Censuses
