= Čučice =

- Municipality
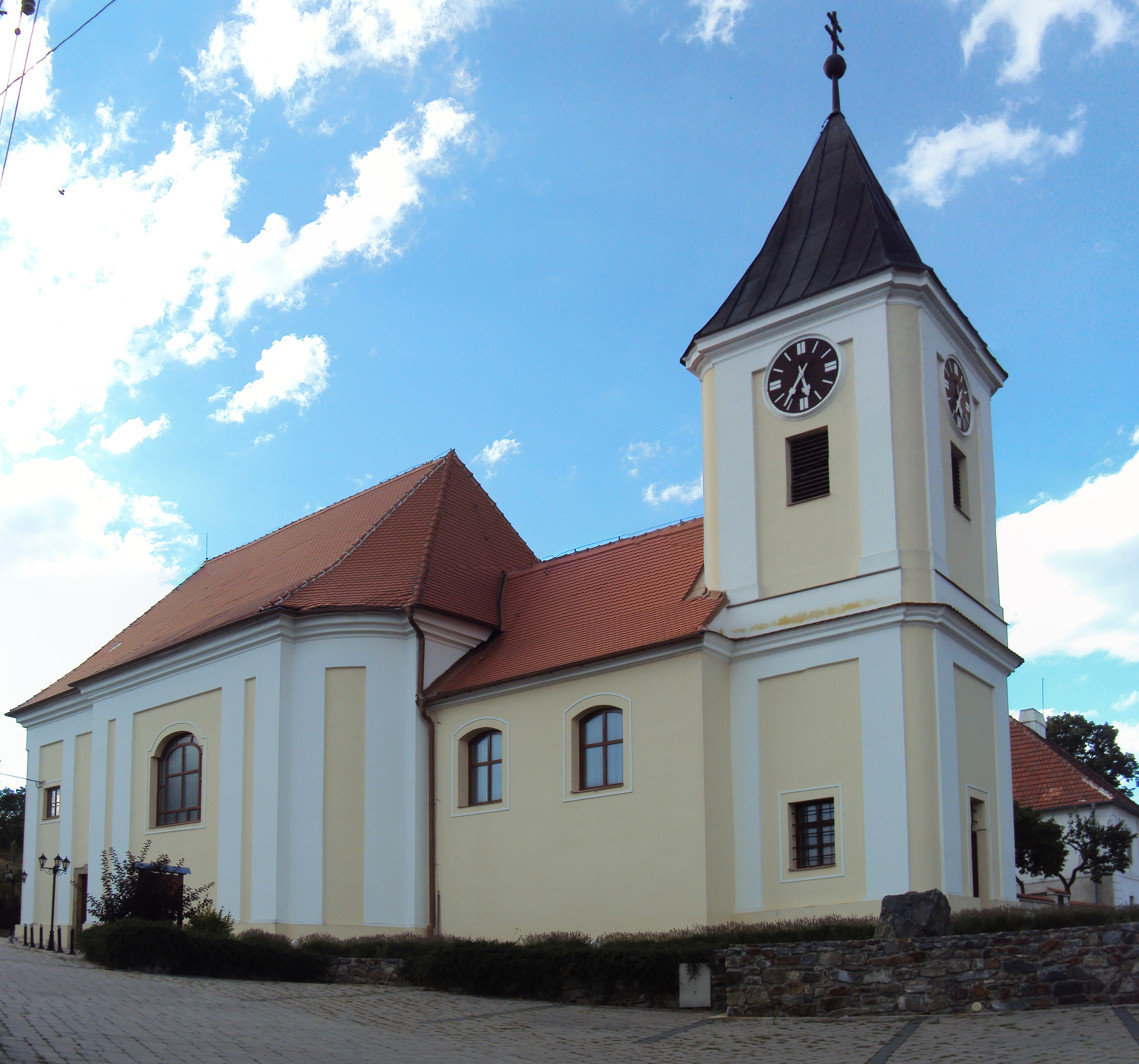
- Church of Saint James the Great

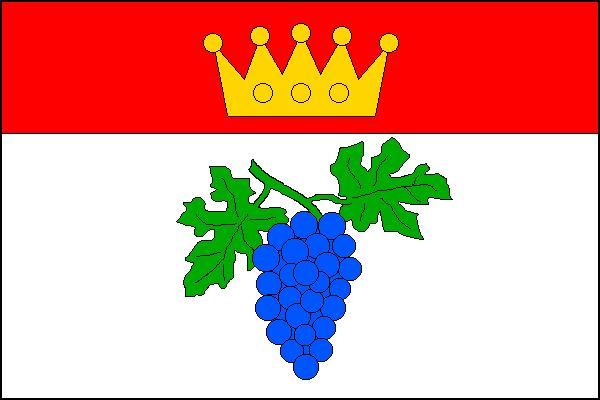
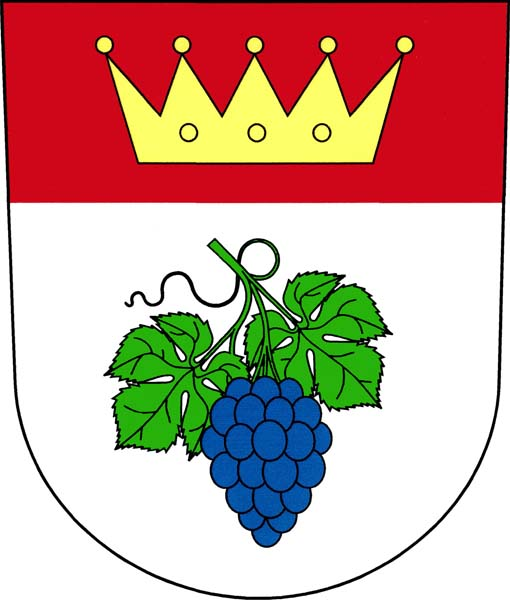
- Flag Coat of arms

- Location in the Czech Republic
- Coordinates: 49°8′14″N 16°16′43″E
- Country: Czech Republic
- Region: South Moravian
- District: Brno-Country
- First mentioned: 1101

Area
  - Total: 8.23 km^{2} (3.18 sq mi)
- Elevation: 334 m (1,096 ft)

Population (2026-01-01)
  - Total: 450
  - Density: 55/km^{2} (140/sq mi)
- Time zone: UTC+1 (CET)
  - Summer (DST): UTC+2 (CEST)
- Postal code: 664 91
- Website: obec.cucice.cz

Čučice is a municipality and village in Brno-Country District in the South Moravian Region of the Czech Republic. It has about 500 inhabitants.

Čučice lies approximately 26 kilometres (16 mi) west of Brno and 171 km (106 mi) south-east of Prague.

== Demographics ==
Historical population
Year	Pop.	±%
1869	238	—
1880	255	+7.1%
1890	315	+23.5%
1900	336	+6.7%
1910	358	+6.5%
1921	452	+26.3%
1930	494	+9.3%
1950	532	+7.7%
1961	539	+1.3%
1970	557	+3.3%
1980	493	−11.5%
1991	451	−8.5%
2001	428	−5.1%
2011	405	−5.4%
2021	428	+5.7%
Source: Censuses
