= Vysoké Popovice =

- Municipality
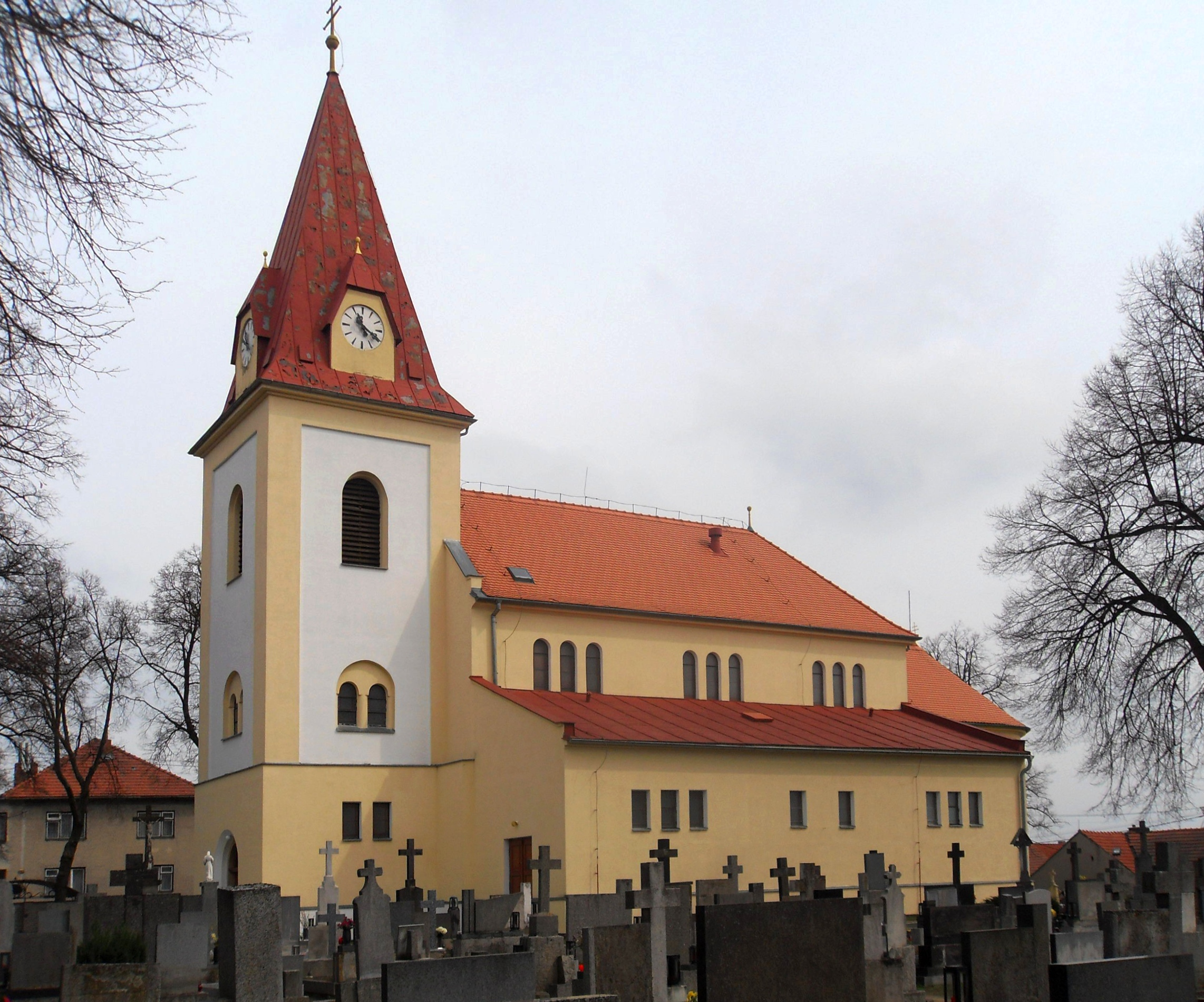
- Church of Saint John the Baptist

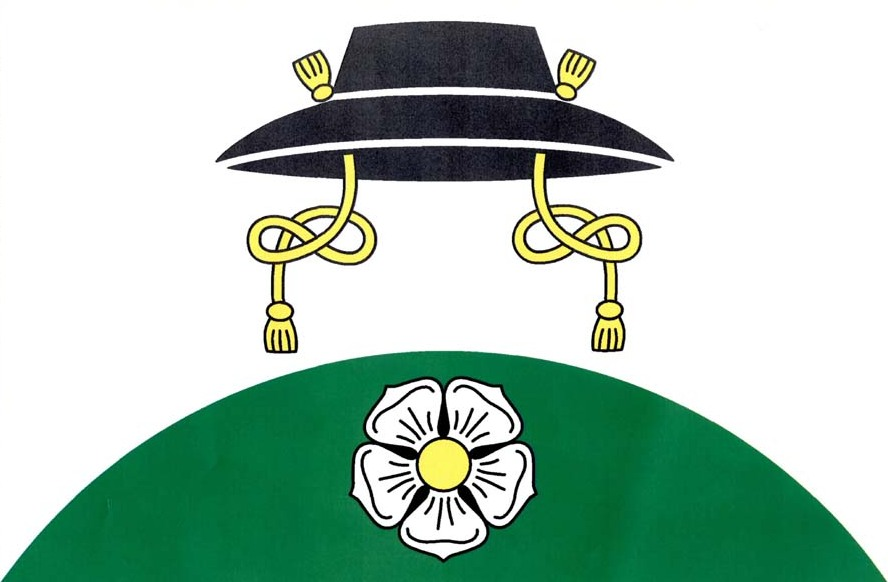
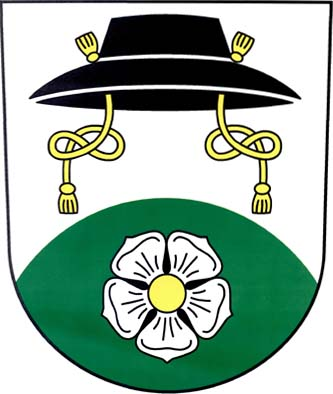
- Flag Coat of arms

- Location in the Czech Republic
- Coordinates: 49°10′59″N 16°17′6″E
- Country: Czech Republic
- Region: South Moravian
- District: Brno-Country
- First mentioned: 1228

Area
  - Total: 3.90 km^{2} (1.51 sq mi)
- Elevation: 459 m (1,506 ft)

Population (2026-01-01)
  - Total: 763
  - Density: 196/km^{2} (507/sq mi)
- Time zone: UTC+1 (CET)
  - Summer (DST): UTC+2 (CEST)
- Postal code: 664 84
- Website: www.vysoke-popovice.cz

Vysoké Popovice (until 1949 Popovice) is a municipality and village in Brno-Country District in the South Moravian Region of the Czech Republic. It has about 800 inhabitants.

Vysoké Popovice lies approximately 25 kilometres (16 mi) west of Brno and 168 km (104 mi) south-east of Prague.

== Demographics ==
Historical population
Year	Pop.	±%
1869	354	—
1880	413	+16.7%
1890	498	+20.6%
1900	576	+15.7%
1910	696	+20.8%
1921	751	+7.9%
1930	751	+0.0%
1950	821	+9.3%
1961	862	+5.0%
1970	775	−10.1%
1980	711	−8.3%
1991	609	−14.3%
2001	592	−2.8%
2011	682	+15.2%
2021	746	+9.4%
Source: Censuses
