= Hostěnice =

- Municipality
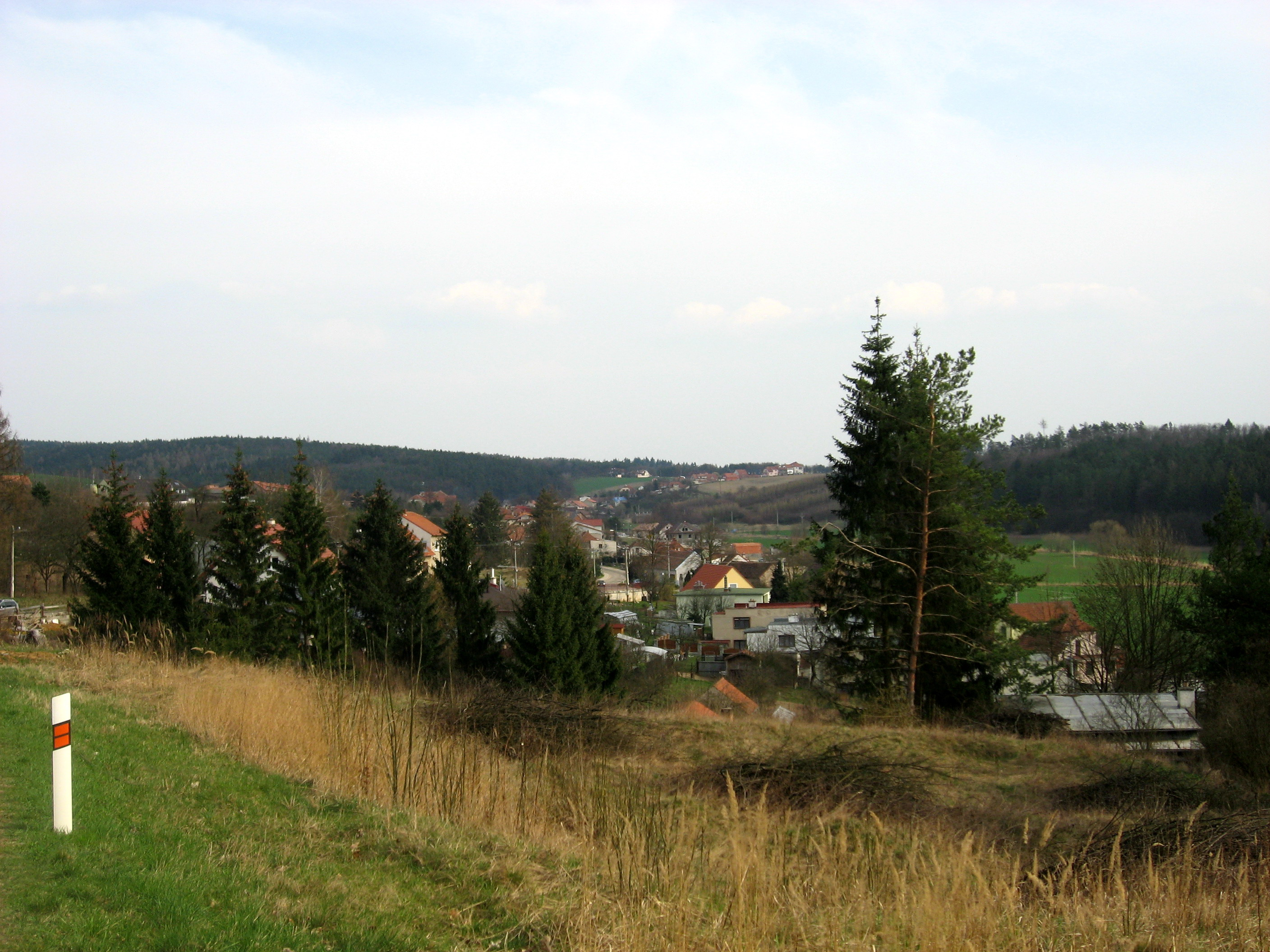
- View towards Hostěnice

- Flag Coat of arms

- Location in the Czech Republic
- Coordinates: 49°14′12″N 16°46′36″E
- Country: Czech Republic
- Region: South Moravian
- District: Brno-Country
- First mentioned: 1371

Area
  - Total: 19.99 km^{2} (7.72 sq mi)
- Elevation: 396 m (1,299 ft)

Population (2026-01-01)
  - Total: 834
  - Density: 41.7/km^{2} (108/sq mi)
- Time zone: UTC+1 (CET)
  - Summer (DST): UTC+2 (CEST)
- Postal codes: 664 04
- Website: www.hostenice.cz

Hostěnice is a municipality and village in Brno-Country District in the South Moravian Region of the Czech Republic. It has about 800 inhabitants.

Hostěnice lies approximately 14 kilometres (9 mi) north-east of Brno and 195 km (121 mi) south-east of Prague.

== Administrative division ==
Hostěnice consists of two municipal parts (in brackets population according to the 2021 census):

- Hostěnice (821)
- Lhotky (20)

== Demographics ==
Historical population
Year	Pop.	±%
1869	435	—
1880	510	+17.2%
1890	534	+4.7%
1900	560	+4.9%
1910	657	+17.3%
1921	596	−9.3%
1930	598	+0.3%
1950	539	−9.9%
1961	590	+9.5%
1970	534	−9.5%
1980	510	−4.5%
1991	457	−10.4%
2001	450	−1.5%
2011	644	+43.1%
2021	841	+30.6%
Source: Censuses
