= Holasice =

- Municipality
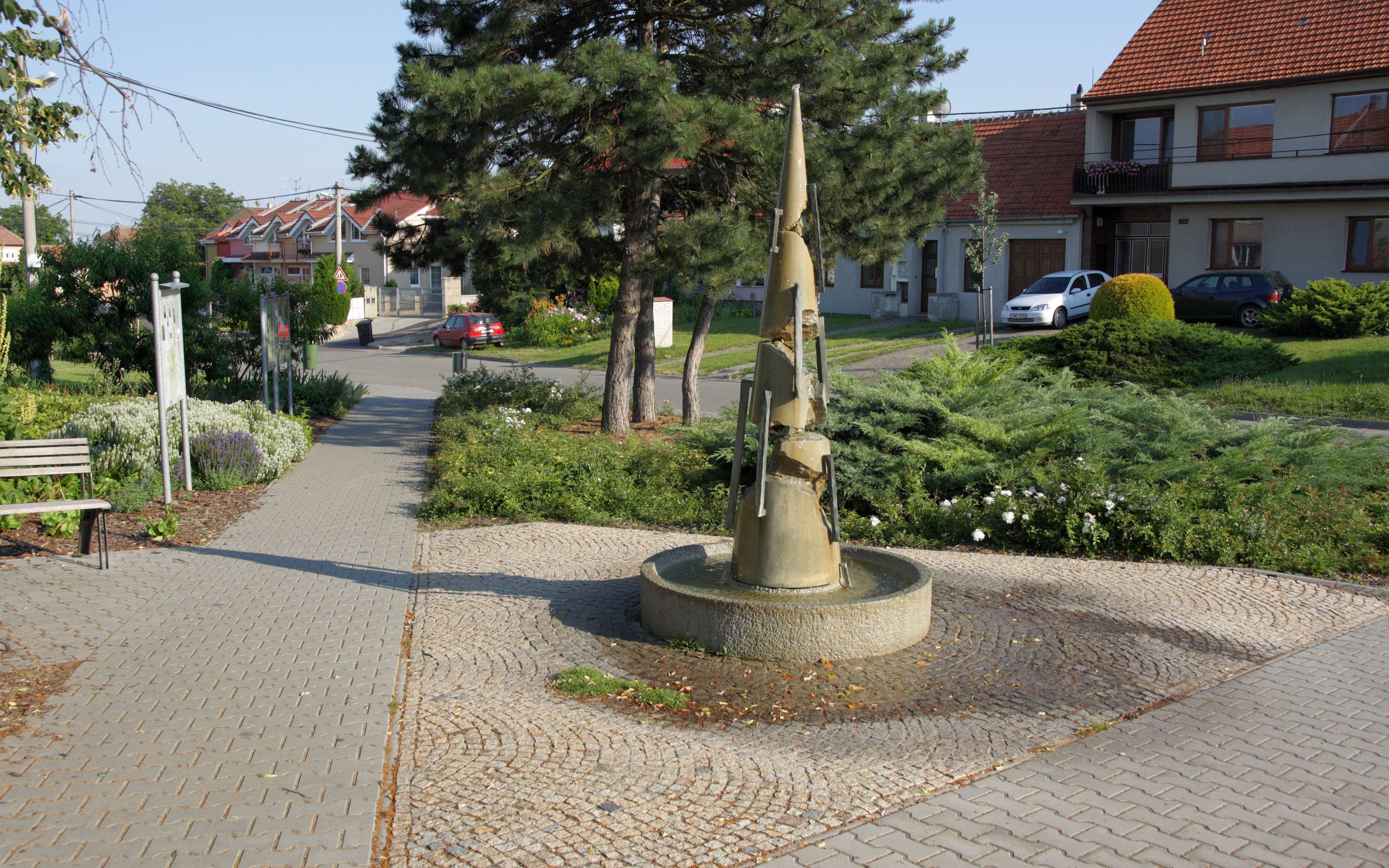
- Rudé armády Square

- Flag Coat of arms

- Location in the Czech Republic
- Coordinates: 49°4′33″N 16°36′27″E
- Country: Czech Republic
- Region: South Moravian
- District: Brno-Country
- First mentioned: 1349

Area
  - Total: 3.54 km^{2} (1.37 sq mi)
- Elevation: 198 m (650 ft)

Population (2026-01-01)
  - Total: 1,422
  - Density: 402/km^{2} (1,040/sq mi)
- Time zone: UTC+1 (CET)
  - Summer (DST): UTC+2 (CEST)
- Postal code: 664 61
- Website: www.holasice.cz

Holasice is a municipality and village in Brno-Country District in the South Moravian Region of the Czech Republic. It has about 1,400 inhabitants.

Holasice lies approximately 15 kilometres (9 mi) south of Brno and 194 km (121 mi) south-east of Prague.

== Demographics ==
Historical population
| Year | Pop. | ±% |
|---|---|---|
| 1869 | 398 | — |
| 1880 | 438 | +10.1% |
| 1890 | 439 | +0.2% |
| 1900 | 436 | −0.7% |
| 1910 | 609 | +39.7% |
| 1921 | 766 | +25.8% |
| 1930 | 897 | +17.1% |
| 1950 | 778 | −13.3% |
| 1961 | 858 | +10.3% |
| 1970 | 865 | +0.8% |
| 1980 | 821 | −5.1% |
| 1991 | 815 | −0.7% |
| 2001 | 848 | +4.0% |
| 2011 | 882 | +4.0% |
| 2021 | 1,282 | +45.4% |
Source: Censuses
