= Řícmanice =

- Municipality
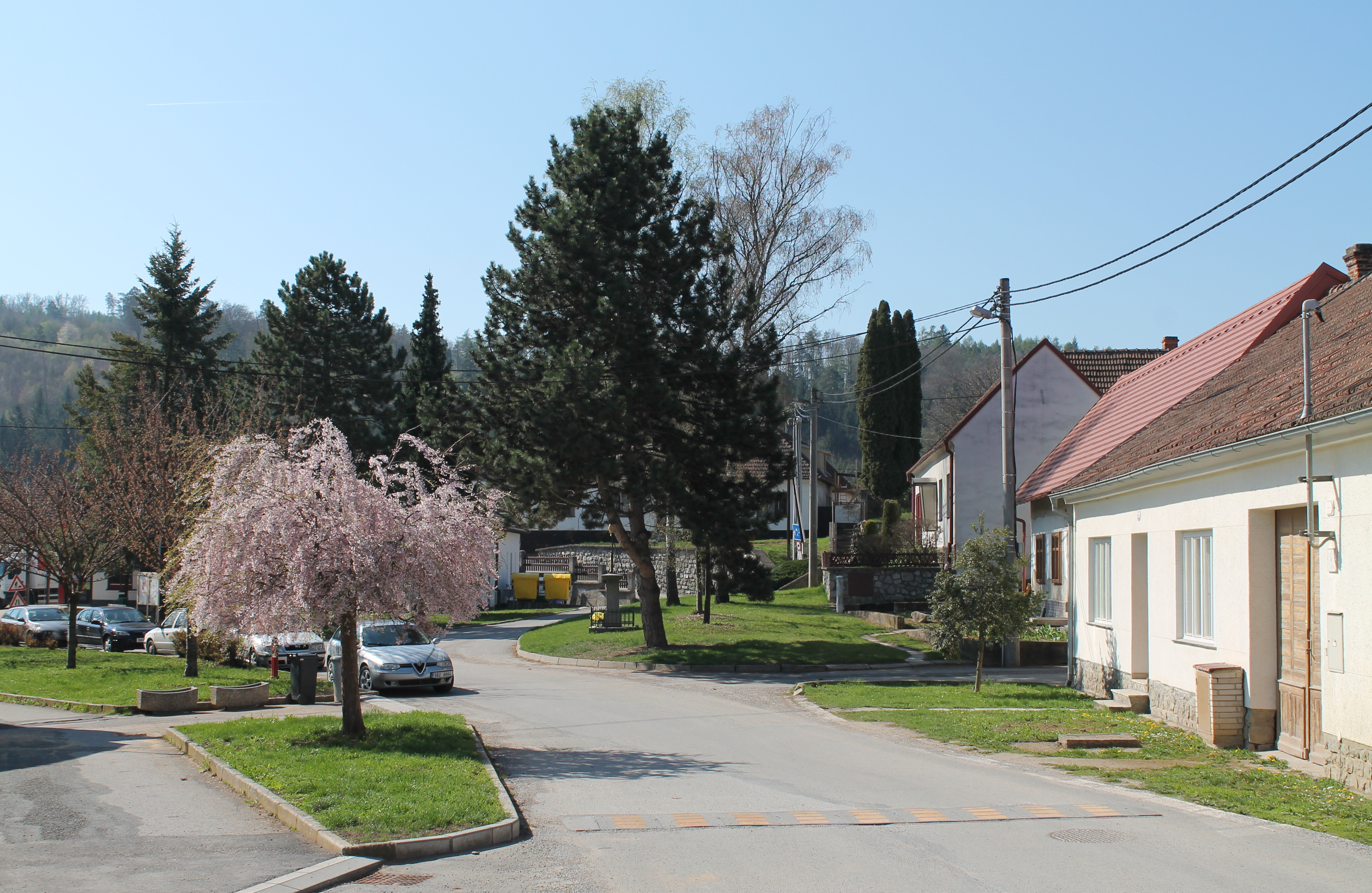
- Masarykovo Square

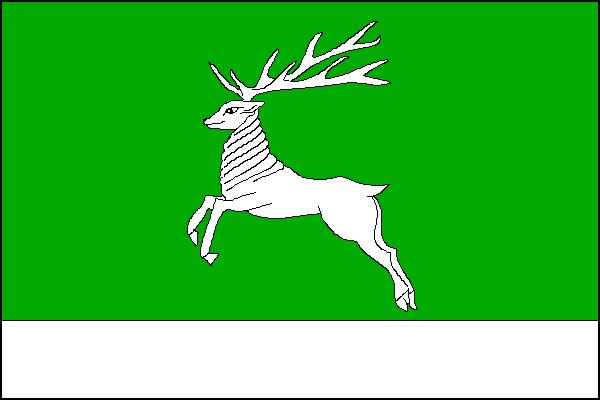
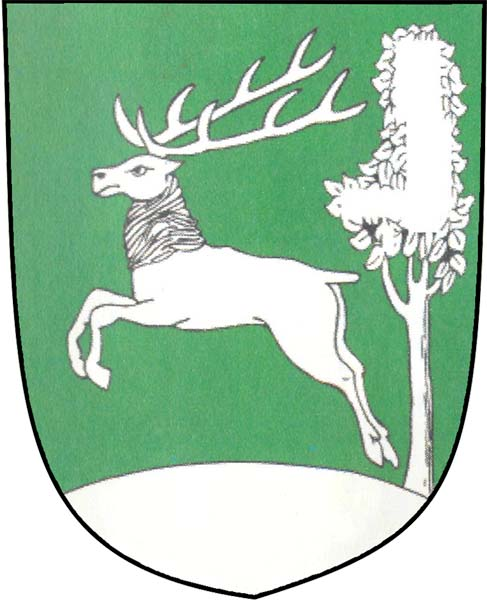
- Flag Coat of arms

- Location in the Czech Republic
- Coordinates: 49°15′27″N 16°41′38″E
- Country: Czech Republic
- Region: South Moravian
- District: Brno-Country
- First mentioned: 1210

Area
  - Total: 1.50 km^{2} (0.58 sq mi)
- Elevation: 278 m (912 ft)

Population (2026-01-01)
  - Total: 833
  - Density: 555/km^{2} (1,440/sq mi)
- Time zone: UTC+1 (CET)
  - Summer (DST): UTC+2 (CEST)
- Postal codes: 664 01
- Website: ricmanice.cz

Řícmanice is a municipality and village in Brno-Country District in the South Moravian Region of the Czech Republic. It has about 800 inhabitants.

Řícmanice lies approximately 9 kilometres (6 mi) north-east of Brno and 188 km (117 mi) south-east of Prague.

== Demographics ==
Historical population
| Year | Pop. | ±% |
|---|---|---|
| 1869 | 390 | — |
| 1880 | 348 | −10.8% |
| 1890 | 431 | +23.9% |
| 1900 | 469 | +8.8% |
| 1910 | 541 | +15.4% |
| 1921 | 569 | +5.2% |
| 1930 | 673 | +18.3% |
| 1950 | 735 | +9.2% |
| 1961 | 735 | +0.0% |
| 1970 | 677 | −7.9% |
| 1980 | 600 | −11.4% |
| 1991 | 541 | −9.8% |
| 2001 | 572 | +5.7% |
| 2011 | 768 | +34.3% |
| 2021 | 824 | +7.3% |
Source: Censuses
