= Mělčany =

- Municipality
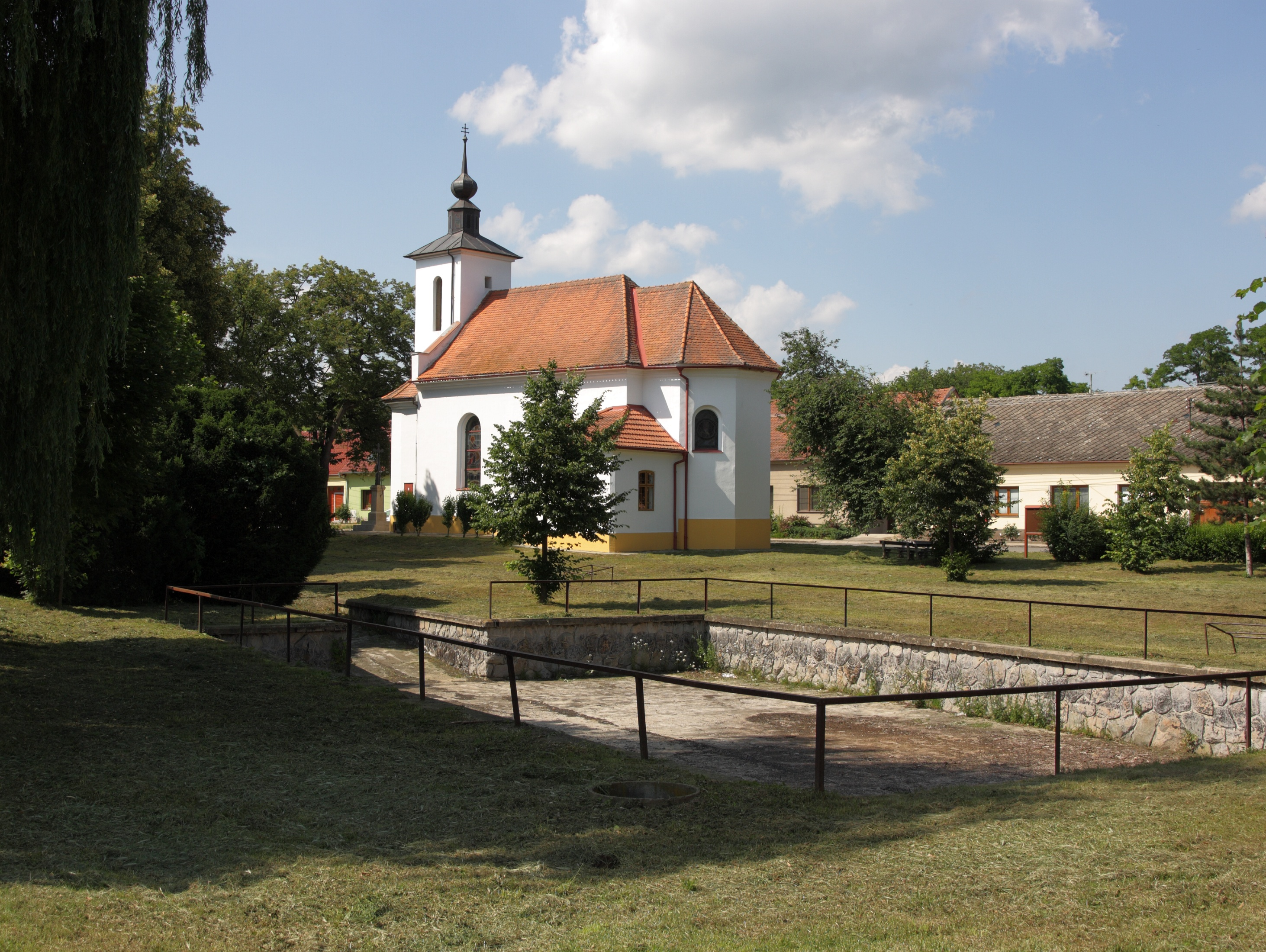
- Chapel of the Assumption of the Virgin Mary

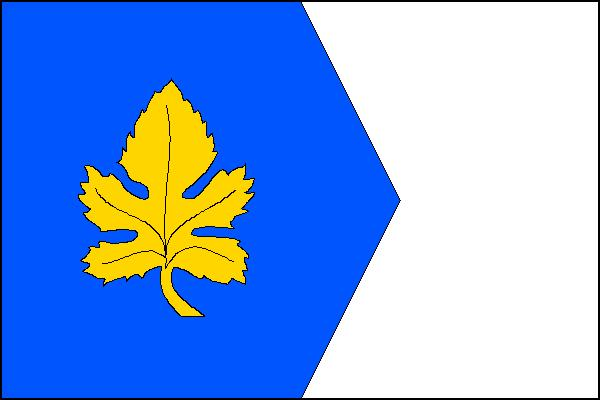
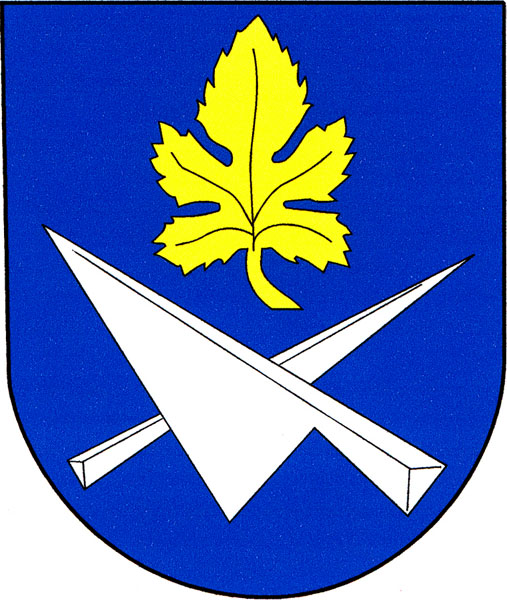
- Flag Coat of arms

- Location in the Czech Republic
- Coordinates: 49°4′34″N 16°29′32″E
- Country: Czech Republic
- Region: South Moravian
- District: Brno-Country
- First mentioned: 1181

Area
  - Total: 7.43 km^{2} (2.87 sq mi)
- Elevation: 230 m (750 ft)

Population (2026-01-01)
  - Total: 514
  - Density: 69.2/km^{2} (179/sq mi)
- Time zone: UTC+1 (CET)
  - Summer (DST): UTC+2 (CEST)
- Postal code: 664 64
- Website: www.melcany.cz

Mělčany is a municipality and village in Brno-Country District in the South Moravian Region of the Czech Republic. It has about 500 inhabitants.

Mělčany lies approximately 17 kilometres (11 mi) south-west of Brno and 187 km (116 mi) south-east of Prague.

== Demographics ==
Historical population
Year	Pop.	±%
1869	539	—
1880	561	+4.1%
1890	613	+9.3%
1900	644	+5.1%
1910	675	+4.8%
1921	640	−5.2%
1930	634	−0.9%
1950	584	−7.9%
1961	607	+3.9%
1970	556	−8.4%
1980	489	−12.1%
1991	464	−5.1%
2001	430	−7.3%
2011	482	+12.1%
2021	479	−0.6%
Source: Censuses
