= Silůvky =

- Municipality
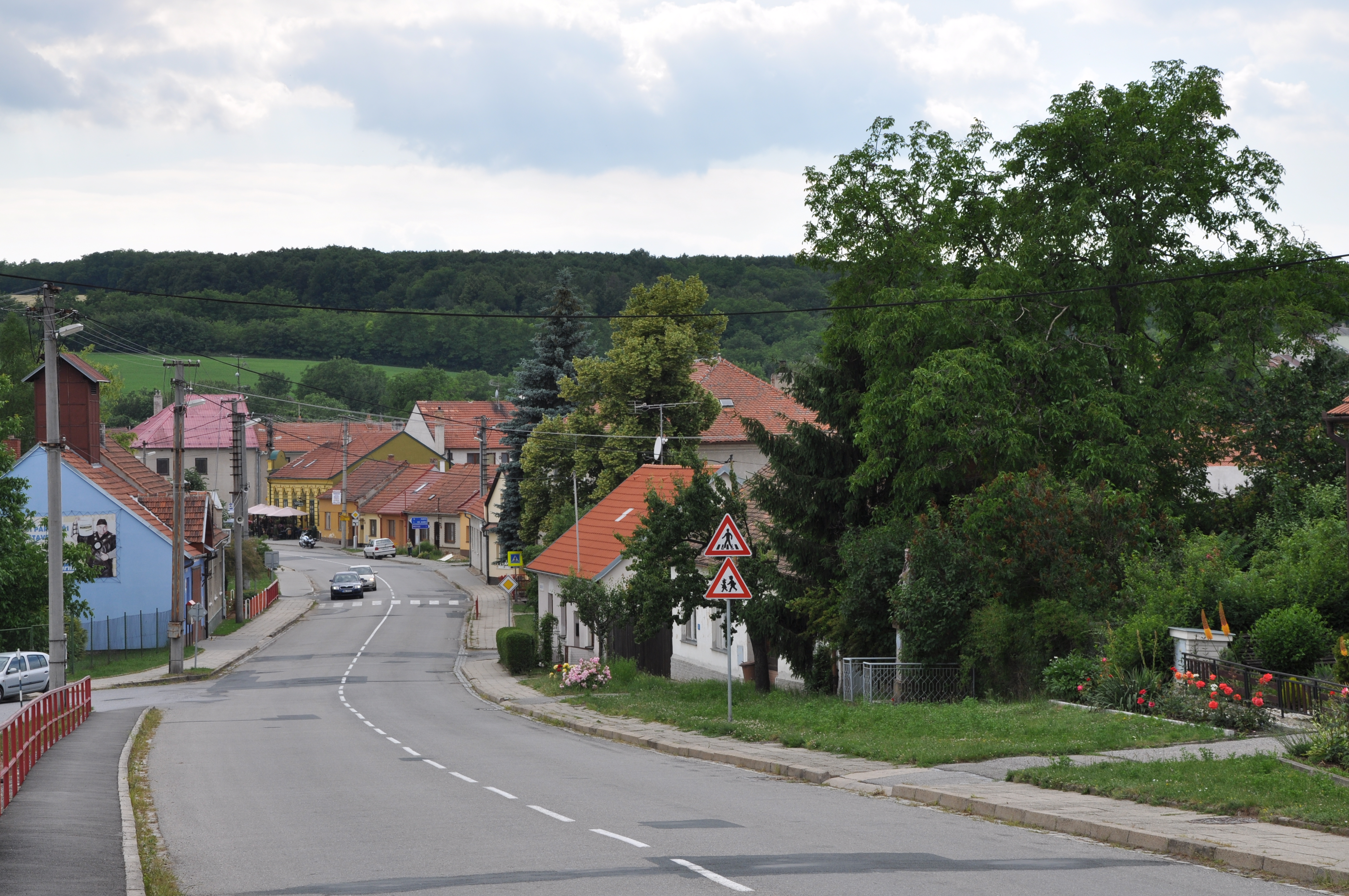
- Main road

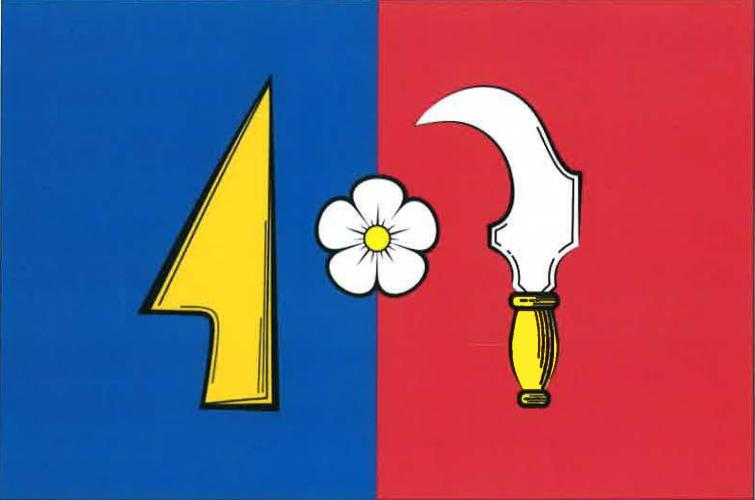
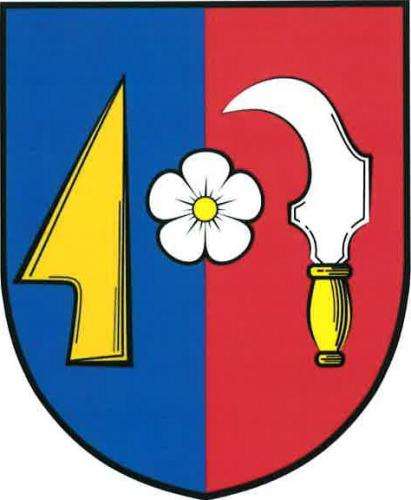
- Flag Coat of arms

- Location in the Czech Republic
- Coordinates: 49°6′22″N 16°28′5″E
- Country: Czech Republic
- Region: South Moravian
- District: Brno-Country
- First mentioned: 1277

Area
  - Total: 6.00 km^{2} (2.32 sq mi)
- Elevation: 270 m (890 ft)

Population (2026-01-01)
  - Total: 861
  - Density: 144/km^{2} (372/sq mi)
- Time zone: UTC+1 (CET)
  - Summer (DST): UTC+2 (CEST)
- Postal code: 664 46
- Website: siluvky.cz

Silůvky is a municipality and village in Brno-Country District in the South Moravian Region of the Czech Republic. It has about 900 inhabitants.

Silůvky lies approximately 16 kilometres (10 mi) south-west of Brno and 184 km (114 mi) south-east of Prague.

== Demographics ==
Historical population
Year	Pop.	±%
1869	445	—
1880	465	+4.5%
1890	506	+8.8%
1900	545	+7.7%
1910	583	+7.0%
1921	690	+18.4%
1930	829	+20.1%
1950	877	+5.8%
1961	869	−0.9%
1970	866	−0.3%
1980	766	−11.5%
1991	691	−9.8%
2001	695	+0.6%
2011	811	+16.7%
2021	830	+2.3%
Source: Censuses
