= Tetčice =

- Municipality
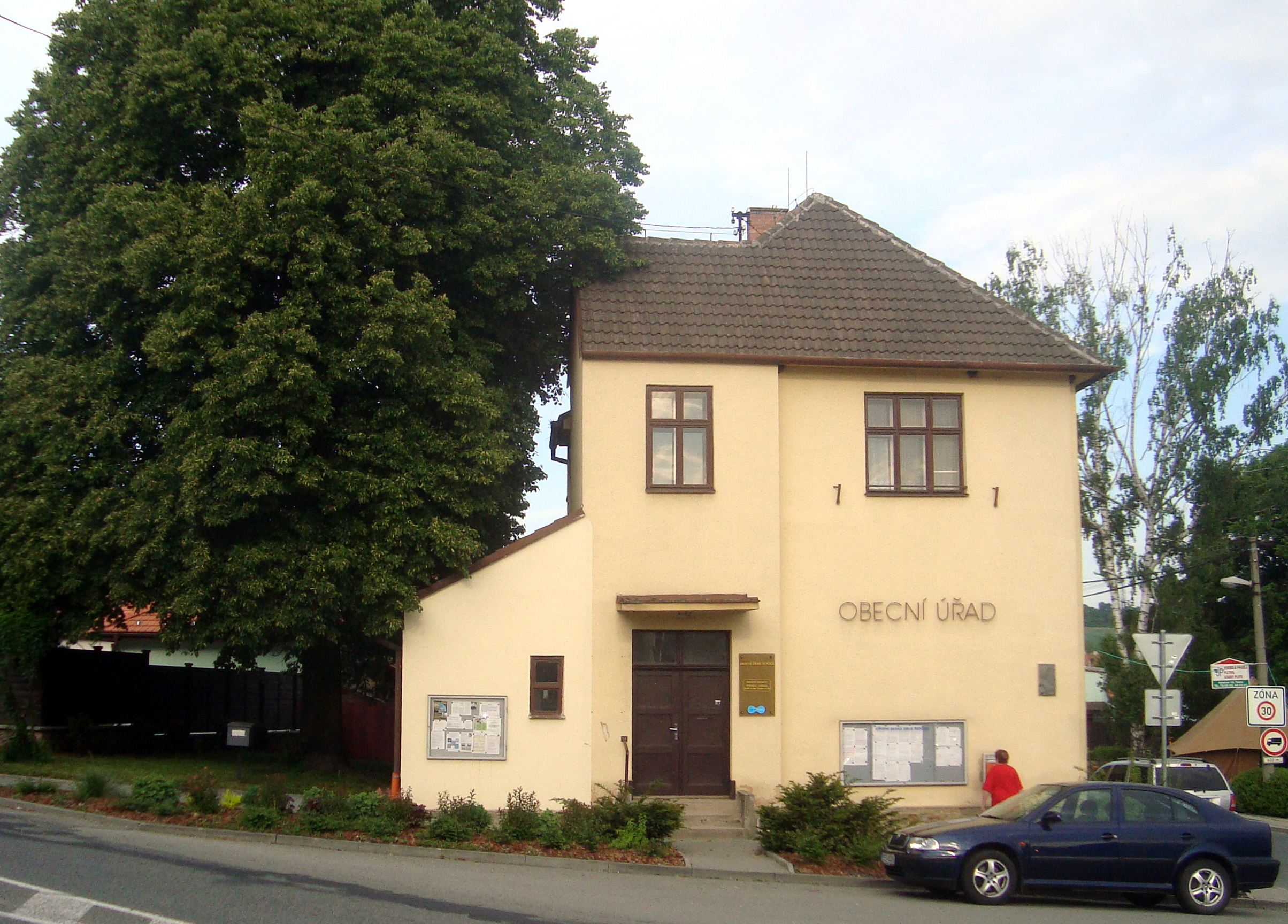
- Municipal office

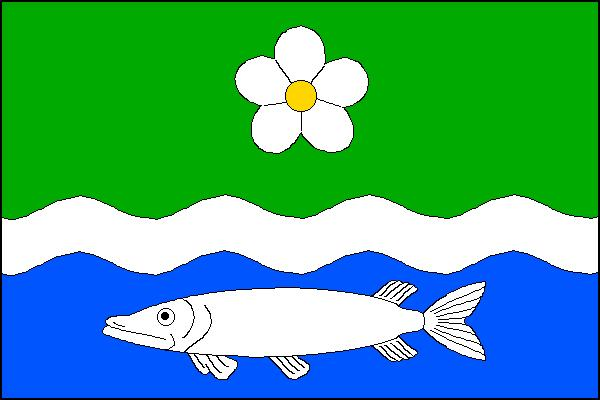
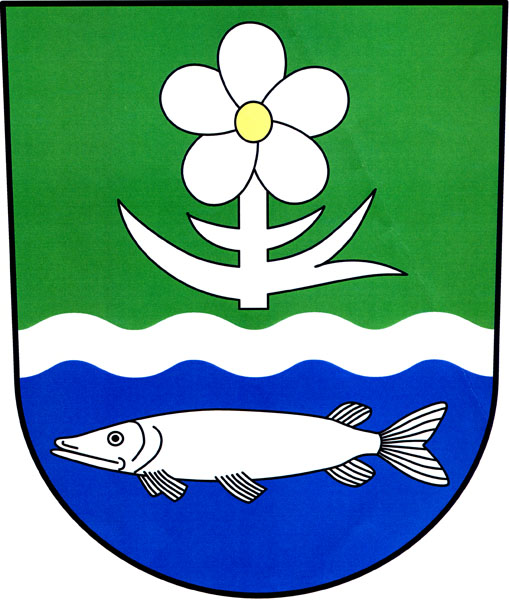
- Flag Coat of arms

- Location in the Czech Republic
- Coordinates: 49°10′13″N 16°24′20″E
- Country: Czech Republic
- Region: South Moravian
- District: Brno-Country
- First mentioned: 1240

Area
  - Total: 15.12 km^{2} (5.84 sq mi)
- Elevation: 326 m (1,070 ft)

Population (2026-01-01)
  - Total: 1,156
  - Density: 76.46/km^{2} (198.0/sq mi)
- Time zone: UTC+1 (CET)
  - Summer (DST): UTC+2 (CEST)
- Postal code: 664 17
- Website: tetcice.cz

Tetčice is a municipality and village in Brno-Country District in the South Moravian Region of the Czech Republic. It has about 1,200 inhabitants.

Tetčice lies approximately 16 kilometres (10 mi) west of Brno and 177 km (110 mi) south-east of Prague.

== History ==
The first written mention of Tetčice is from 1240.

== Demographics ==
Historical population
Year	Pop.	±%
1869	399	—
1880	445	+11.5%
1890	481	+8.1%
1900	526	+9.4%
1910	595	+13.1%
1921	555	−6.7%
1930	778	+40.2%
1950	855	+9.9%
1961	882	+3.2%
1970	891	+1.0%
1980	915	+2.7%
1991	928	+1.4%
2001	946	+1.9%
2011	1,042	+10.1%
2021	1,135	+8.9%
Source: Censuses
