= Přísnotice =

- Municipality
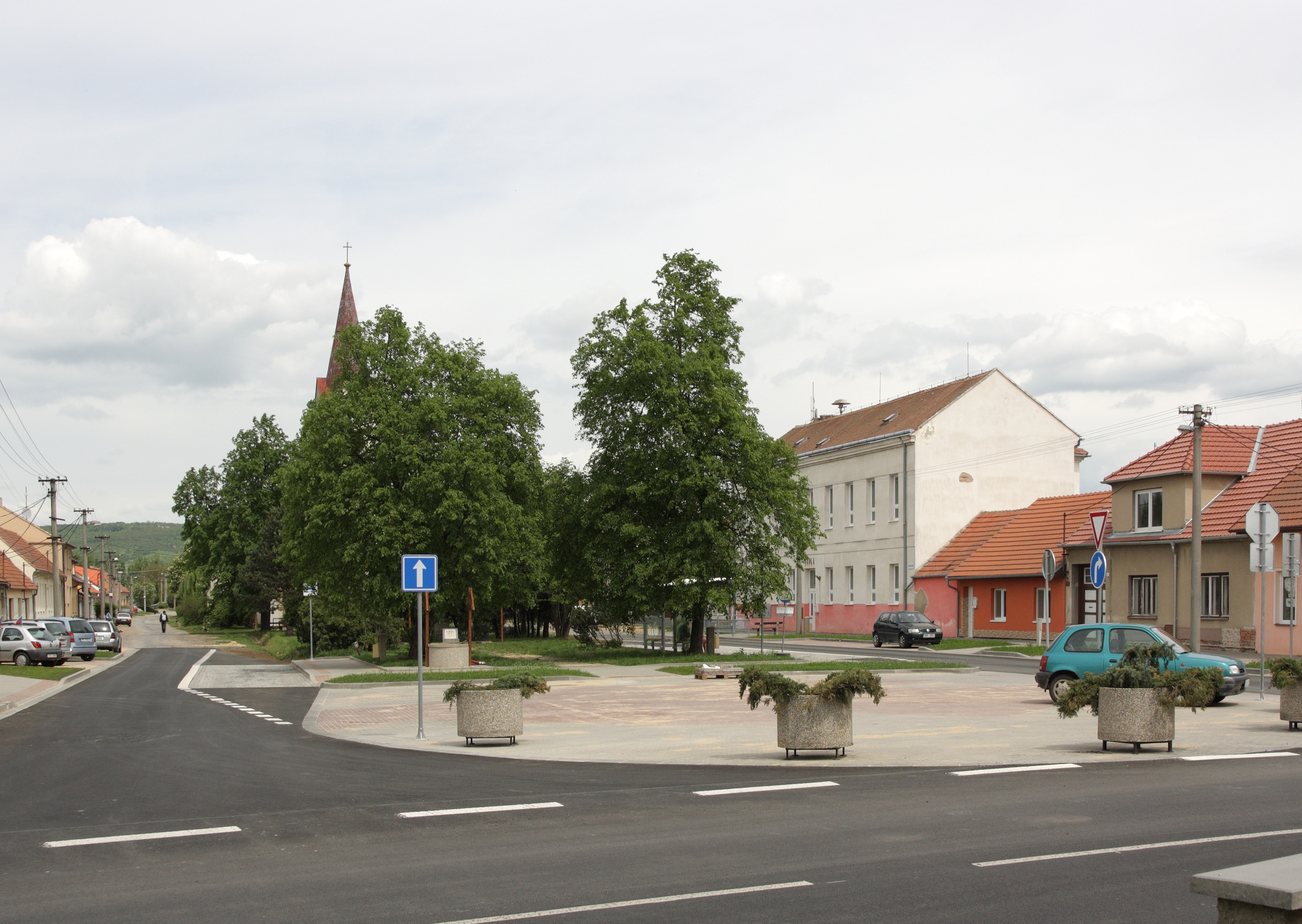
- Centre of Přísnotice

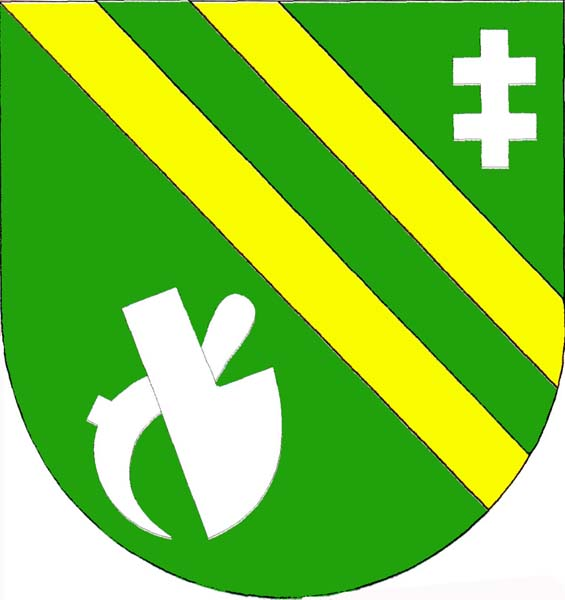
- Flag Coat of arms

- Location in the Czech Republic
- Coordinates: 49°0′11″N 16°36′49″E
- Country: Czech Republic
- Region: South Moravian
- District: Brno-Country
- First mentioned: 1348

Area
  - Total: 7.70 km^{2} (2.97 sq mi)
- Elevation: 181 m (594 ft)

Population (2026-01-01)
  - Total: 881
  - Density: 114/km^{2} (296/sq mi)
- Time zone: UTC+1 (CET)
  - Summer (DST): UTC+2 (CEST)
- Postal code: 664 63
- Website: www.prisnotice.cz

Přísnotice is a municipality and village in Brno-Country District in the South Moravian Region of the Czech Republic. It has about 900 inhabitants.

Přísnotice lies approximately 23 kilometres (14 mi) south of Brno and 199 km (124 mi) south-east of Prague.

== Demographics ==
Historical population
Year	Pop.	±%
1869	572	—
1880	636	+11.2%
1890	767	+20.6%
1900	773	+0.8%
1910	812	+5.0%
1921	904	+11.3%
1930	964	+6.6%
1950	964	+0.0%
1961	1,113	+15.5%
1970	1,014	−8.9%
1980	952	−6.1%
1991	809	−15.0%
2001	793	−2.0%
2011	835	+5.3%
2021	851	+1.9%
Source: Censuses
