= Opatovice (Brno-Country District) =

- Municipality
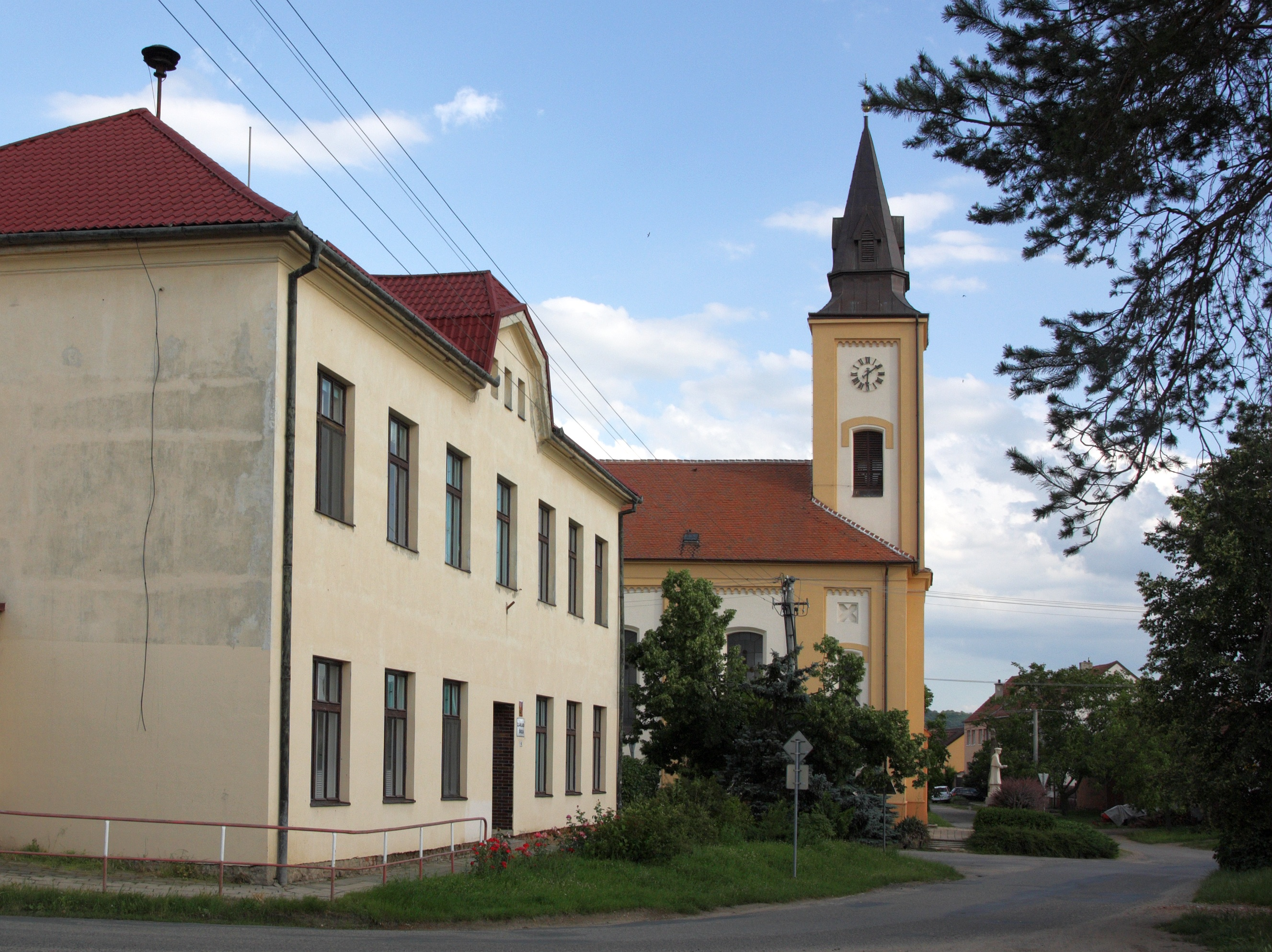
- Primary school and the Church of Charles Borromeo

- Flag Coat of arms

- Location in the Czech Republic
- Coordinates: 49°4′30″N 16°38′28″E
- Country: Czech Republic
- Region: South Moravian
- District: Brno-Country
- First mentioned: 1048

Area
  - Total: 6.15 km^{2} (2.37 sq mi)
- Elevation: 185 m (607 ft)

Population (2026-01-01)
  - Total: 1,161
  - Density: 189/km^{2} (489/sq mi)
- Time zone: UTC+1 (CET)
  - Summer (DST): UTC+2 (CEST)
- Postal code: 664 61
- Website: www.opatovice.eu

Opatovice is a municipality and village in Brno-Country District in the South Moravian Region of the Czech Republic. It has about 1,200 inhabitants.

Opatovice lies approximately 14 kilometres (9 mi) south of Brno and 196 km (122 mi) south-east of Prague.

== Demographics ==
Historical population
Year	Pop.	±%
1869	571	—
1880	694	+21.5%
1890	789	+13.7%
1900	848	+7.5%
1910	894	+5.4%
1921	879	−1.7%
1930	971	+10.5%
1950	998	+2.8%
1961	1,066	+6.8%
1970	1,100	+3.2%
1980	1,025	−6.8%
1991	966	−5.8%
2001	950	−1.7%
2011	983	+3.5%
2021	1,114	+13.3%
Source: Censuses
