= Sobotovice =

- Municipality
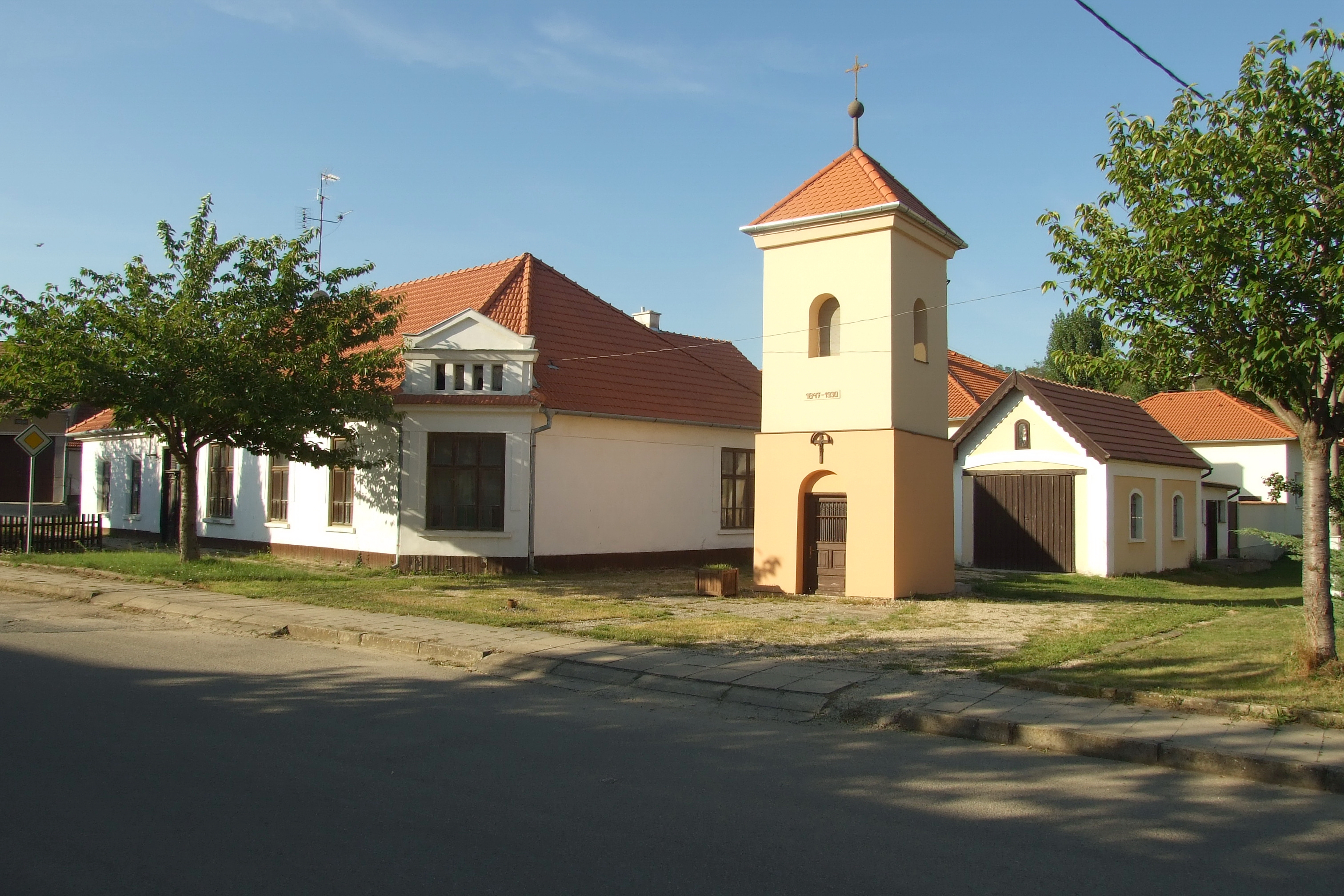
- Belfry

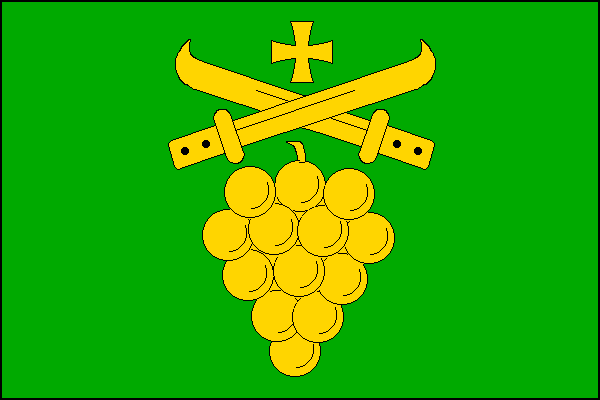
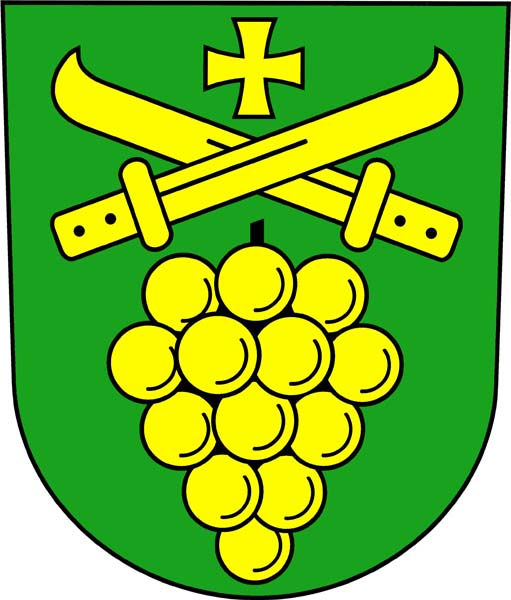
- Flag Coat of arms

- Location in the Czech Republic
- Coordinates: 49°3′36″N 16°33′26″E
- Country: Czech Republic
- Region: South Moravian
- District: Brno-Country
- First mentioned: 1258

Area
  - Total: 5.33 km^{2} (2.06 sq mi)
- Elevation: 207 m (679 ft)

Population (2026-01-01)
  - Total: 679
  - Density: 127/km^{2} (330/sq mi)
- Time zone: UTC+1 (CET)
  - Summer (DST): UTC+2 (CEST)
- Postal code: 664 67
- Website: www.sobotovice.cz

Sobotovice is a municipality and village in Brno-Country District in the South Moravian Region of the Czech Republic. It has about 700 inhabitants.

Sobotovice lies approximately 17 kilometres (11 mi) south of Brno and 192 km (119 mi) south-east of Prague.

== Demographics ==
Historical population
Year	Pop.	±%
1869	353	—
1880	400	+13.3%
1890	439	+9.7%
1900	512	+16.6%
1910	543	+6.1%
1921	570	+5.0%
1930	611	+7.2%
1950	579	−5.2%
1961	583	+0.7%
1970	596	+2.2%
1980	523	−12.2%
1991	468	−10.5%
2001	483	+3.2%
2011	491	+1.7%
2021	607	+23.6%
Source: Censuses
