= Braníškov =

- Municipality
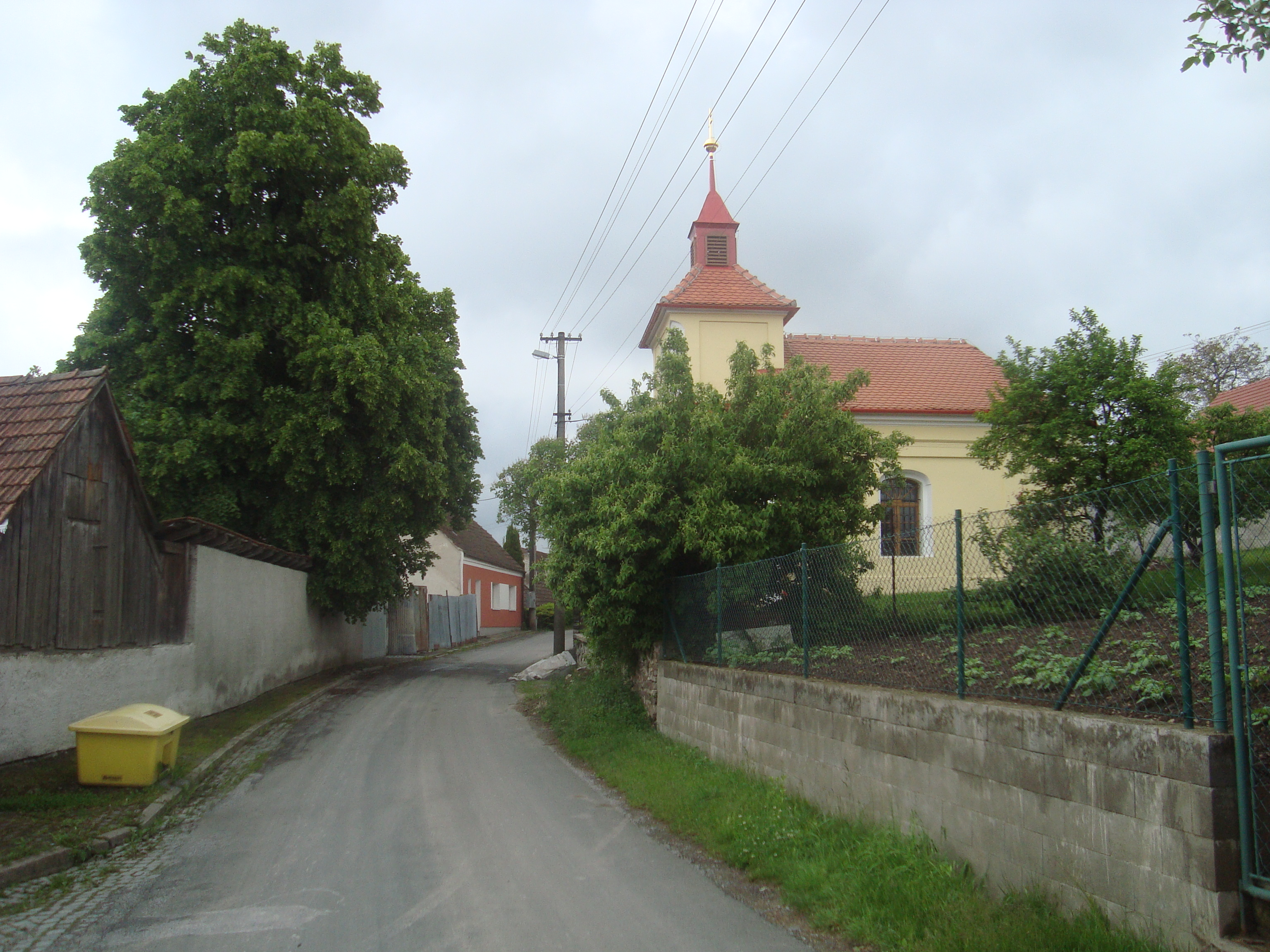
- Chapel of Saints Cyril and Methodius

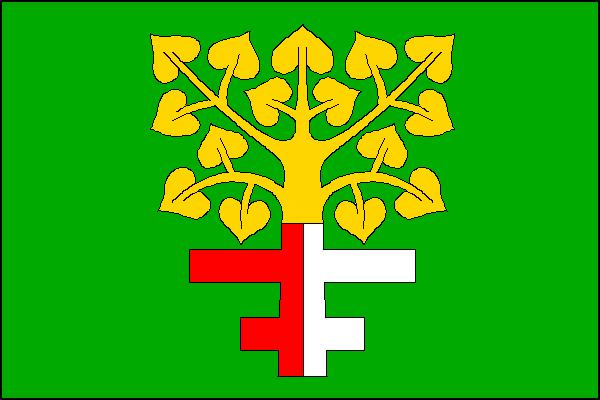
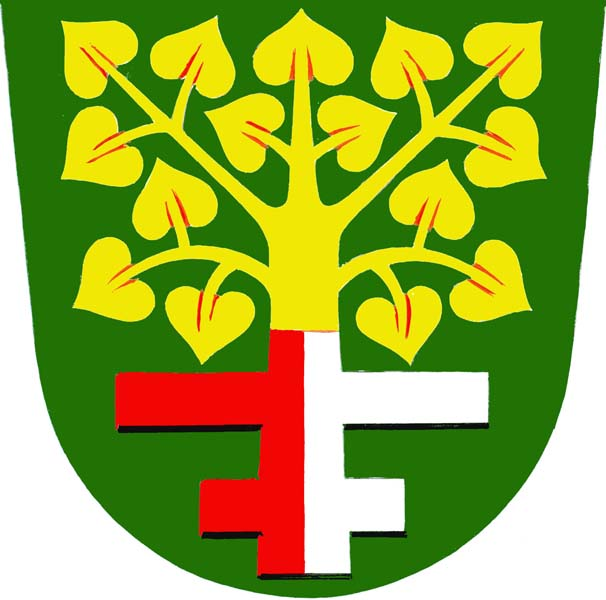
- Flag Coat of arms

- Location in the Czech Republic
- Coordinates: 49°17′40″N 16°20′44″E
- Country: Czech Republic
- Region: South Moravian
- District: Brno-Country
- First mentioned: 1360

Area
  - Total: 3.66 km^{2} (1.41 sq mi)
- Elevation: 486 m (1,594 ft)

Population (2026-01-01)
  - Total: 216
  - Density: 59.0/km^{2} (153/sq mi)
- Time zone: UTC+1 (CET)
  - Summer (DST): UTC+2 (CEST)
- Postal code: 664 71
- Website: www.braniskov.cz

Braníškov is a municipality and village in Brno-Country District in the South Moravian Region of the Czech Republic. It has about 200 inhabitants.

Braníškov lies approximately 23 kilometres (14 mi) north-west of Brno and 165 km (103 mi) south-east of Prague.

== Demographics ==
Historical population
Year	Pop.	±%
1869	207	—
1880	230	+11.1%
1890	204	−11.3%
1900	230	+12.7%
1910	236	+2.6%
1921	230	−2.5%
1930	225	−2.2%
1950	219	−2.7%
1961	229	+4.6%
1970	224	−2.2%
1980	198	−11.6%
1991	176	−11.1%
2001	163	−7.4%
2011	189	+16.0%
2021	198	+4.8%
Source: Censuses
