= Zbraslav (Brno-Country District) =

- Municipality
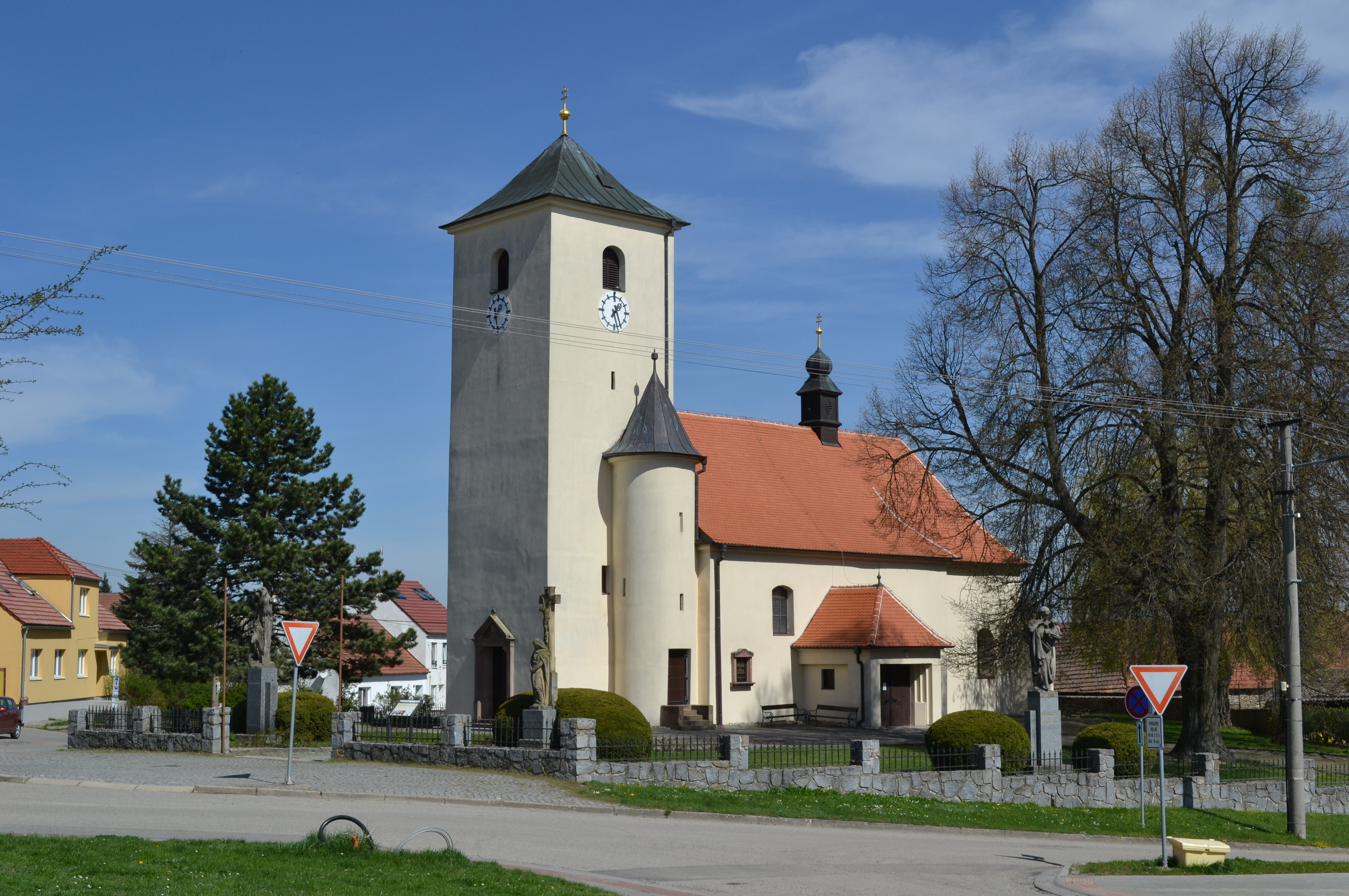
- Church of Saint Giles

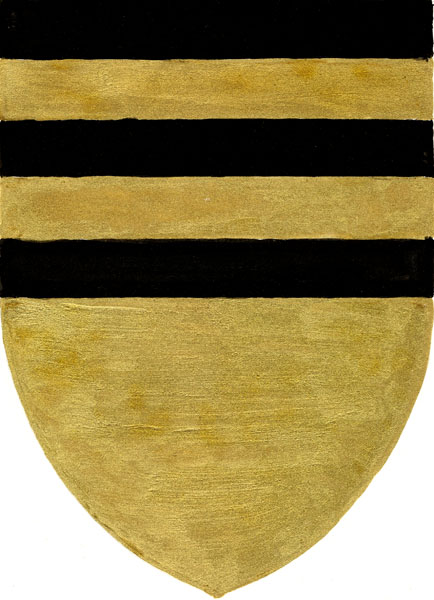
- Flag Coat of arms

- Location in the Czech Republic
- Coordinates: 49°13′18″N 16°17′39″E
- Country: Czech Republic
- Region: South Moravian
- District: Brno-Country
- First mentioned: 1222

Area
  - Total: 8.97 km^{2} (3.46 sq mi)
- Elevation: 458 m (1,503 ft)

Population (2026-01-01)
  - Total: 1,313
  - Density: 146/km^{2} (379/sq mi)
- Time zone: UTC+1 (CET)
  - Summer (DST): UTC+2 (CEST)
- Postal code: 664 84
- Website: www.zbraslavubrna.cz

Zbraslav is a municipality and village in Brno-Country District in the South Moravian Region of the Czech Republic. It has about 1,300 inhabitants.

Zbraslav lies approximately 24 kilometres (15 mi) west of Brno and 166 km (103 mi) south-east of Prague.

== Demographics ==
Historical population
Year	Pop.	±%
1869	900	—
1880	917	+1.9%
1890	990	+8.0%
1900	1,098	+10.9%
1910	1,227	+11.7%
1921	1,231	+0.3%
1930	1,335	+8.4%
1950	1,271	−4.8%
1961	1,423	+12.0%
1970	1,370	−3.7%
1980	1,238	−9.6%
1991	1,197	−3.3%
2001	1,197	+0.0%
2011	1,284	+7.3%
2021	1,229	−4.3%
Source: Censuses
