= Unkovice =

- Municipality
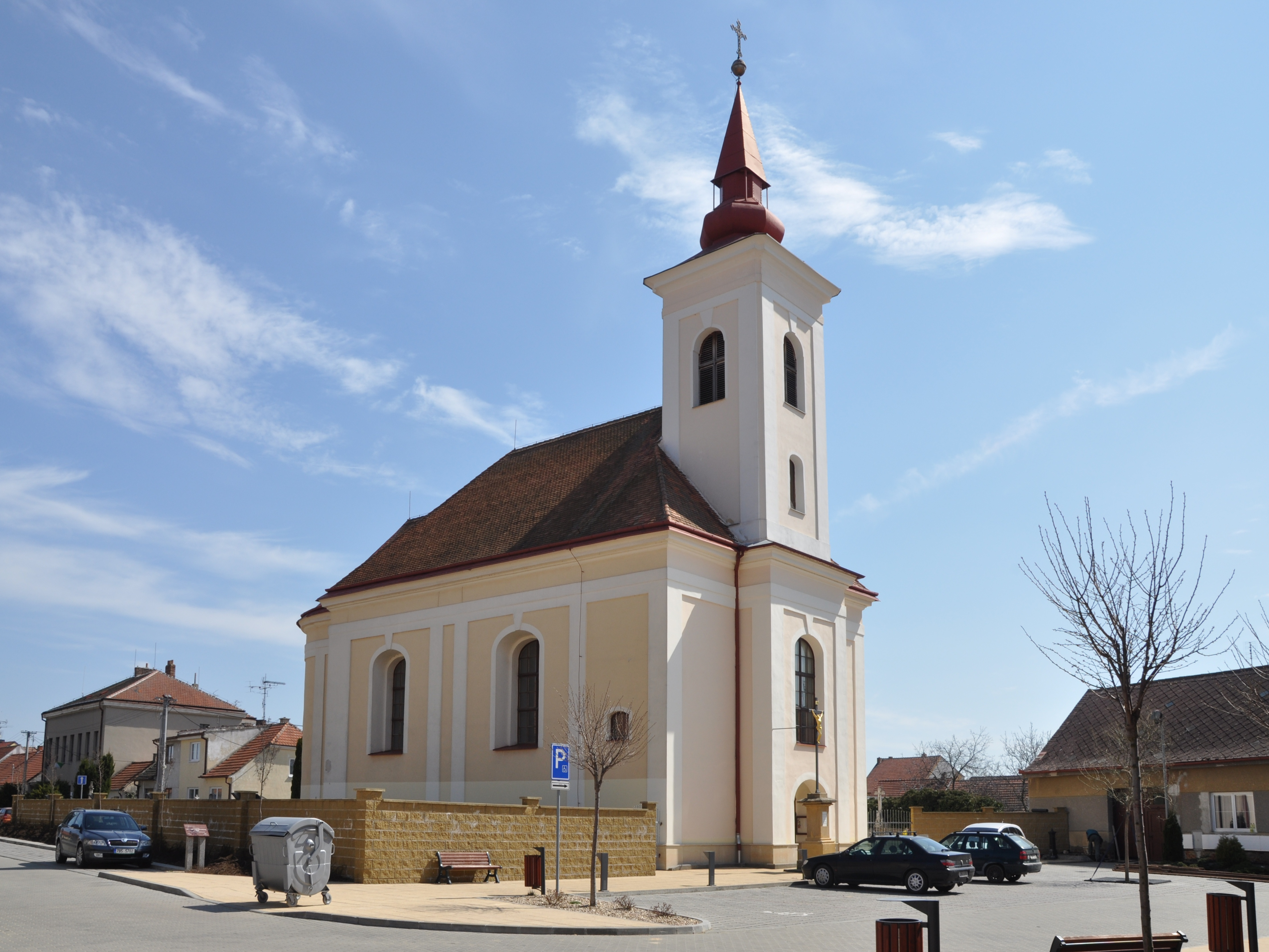
- Church of the Assumption of the Virgin Mary

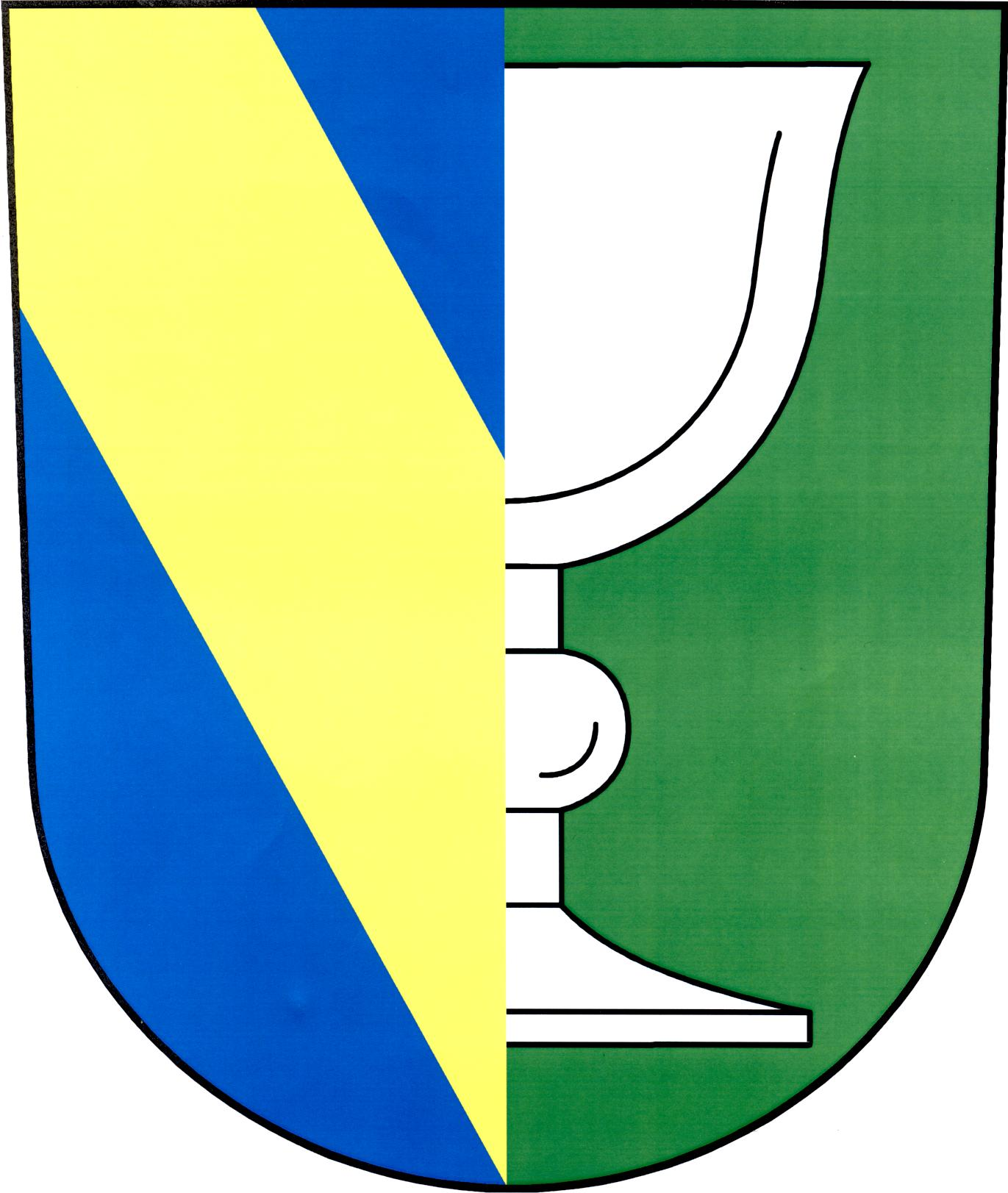
- Flag Coat of arms

- Location in the Czech Republic
- Coordinates: 49°1′9″N 16°36′15″E
- Country: Czech Republic
- Region: South Moravian
- District: Brno-Country
- First mentioned: 1131

Area
  - Total: 3.72 km^{2} (1.44 sq mi)
- Elevation: 180 m (590 ft)

Population (2026-01-01)
  - Total: 713
  - Density: 192/km^{2} (496/sq mi)
- Time zone: UTC+1 (CET)
  - Summer (DST): UTC+2 (CEST)
- Postal code: 664 63
- Website: www.obecunkovice.cz

Unkovice is a municipality and village in Brno-Country District in the South Moravian Region of the Czech Republic. It has about 700 inhabitants.

Unkovice lies approximately 21 kilometres (13 mi) south of Brno and 197 km (122 mi) south-east of Prague.

== Demographics ==
Historical population
Year	Pop.	±%
1869	479	—
1880	534	+11.5%
1890	574	+7.5%
1900	548	−4.5%
1910	605	+10.4%
1921	610	+0.8%
1930	607	−0.5%
1950	530	−12.7%
1961	597	+12.6%
1970	634	+6.2%
1980	641	+1.1%
1991	622	−3.0%
2001	635	+2.1%
2011	680	+7.1%
2021	737	+8.4%
Source: Censuses
