= Prštice =

- Municipality
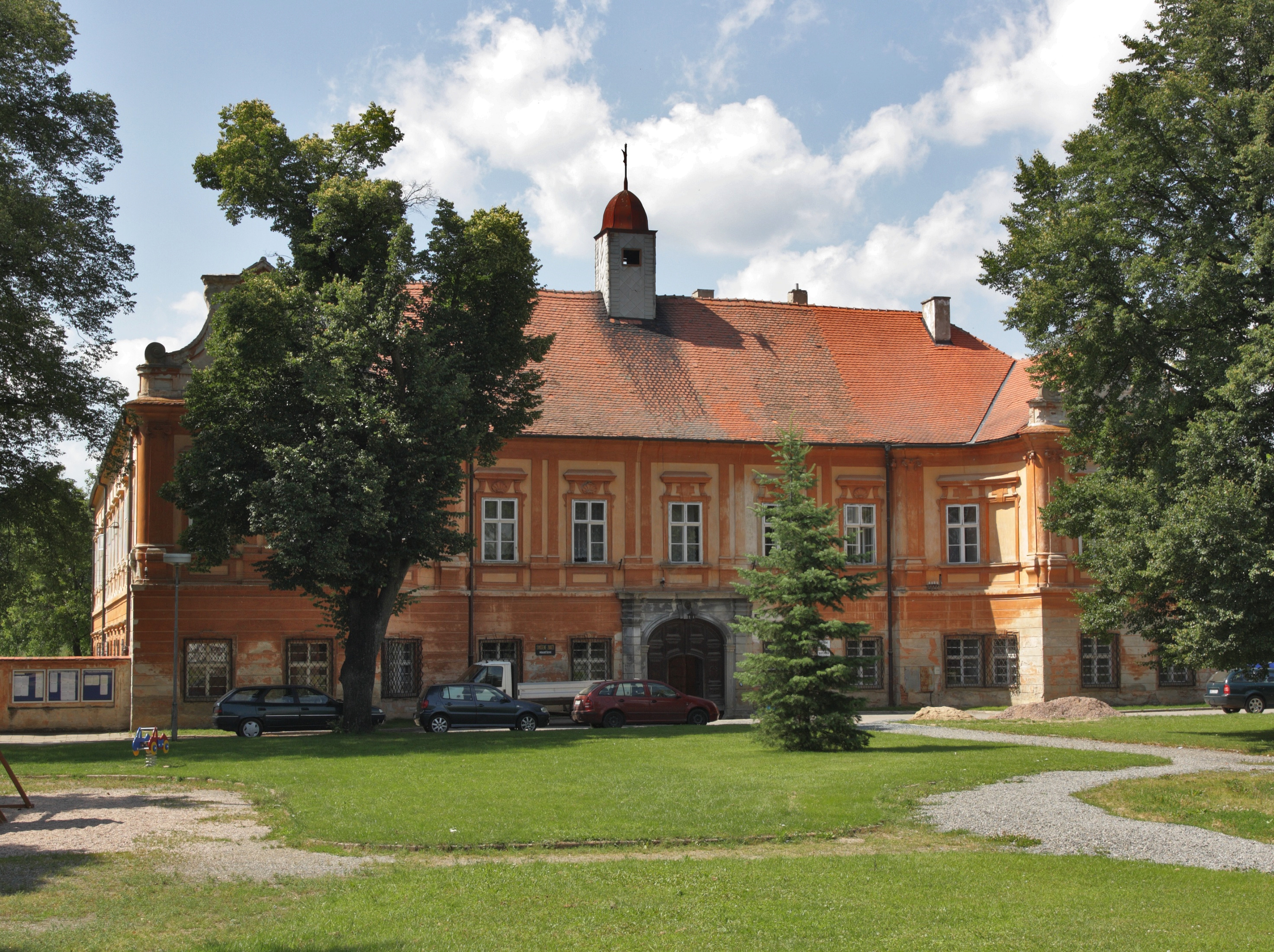
- Prštice Castle

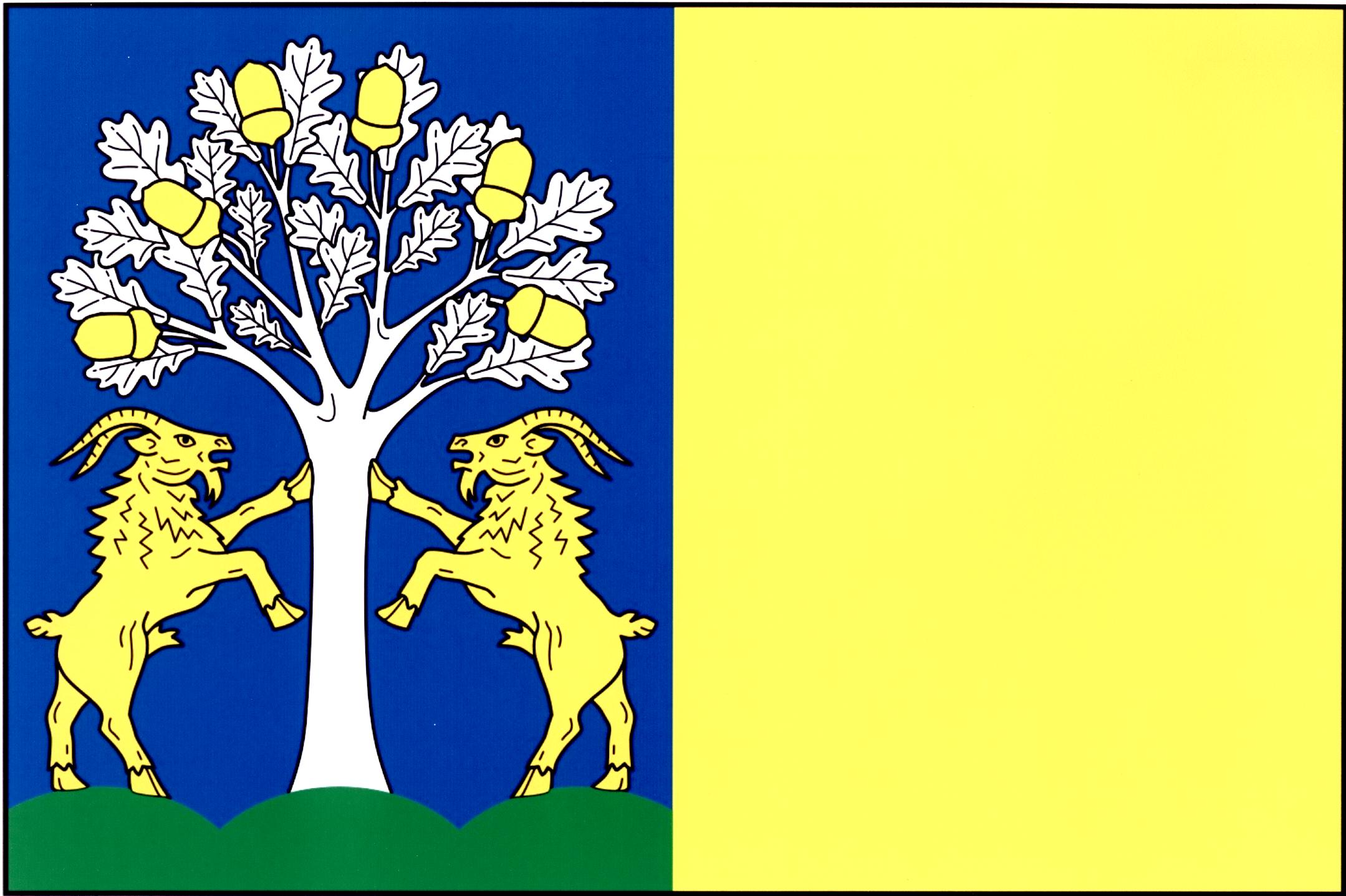
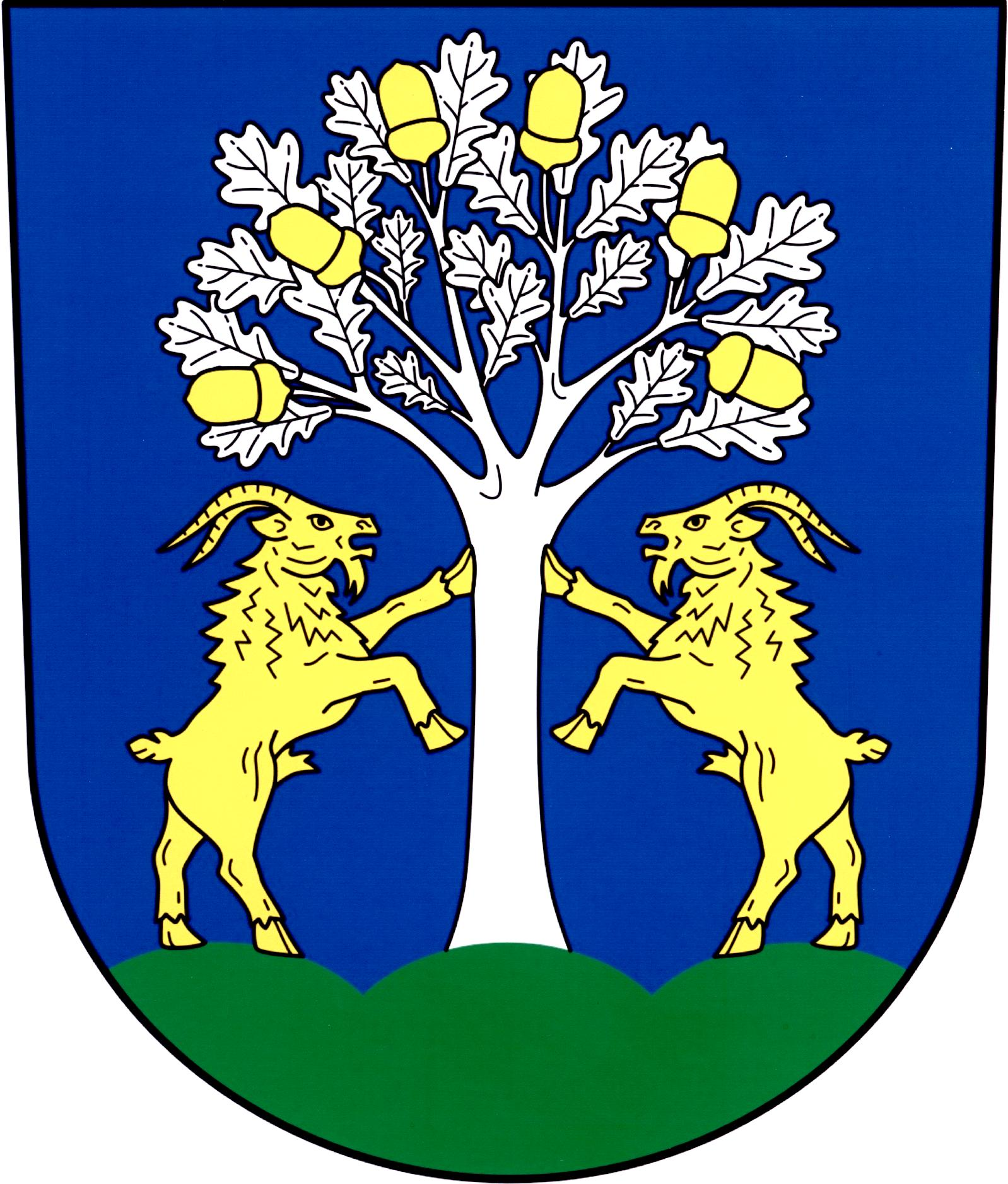
- Flag Coat of arms

- Location in the Czech Republic
- Coordinates: 49°6′54″N 16°28′15″E
- Country: Czech Republic
- Region: South Moravian
- District: Brno-Country
- First mentioned: 1289

Area
  - Total: 7.83 km^{2} (3.02 sq mi)
- Elevation: 293 m (961 ft)

Population (2026-01-01)
  - Total: 989
  - Density: 126/km^{2} (327/sq mi)
- Time zone: UTC+1 (CET)
  - Summer (DST): UTC+2 (CEST)
- Postal code: 664 46
- Website: www.prstice.cz

Prštice is a municipality and village in Brno-Country District in the South Moravian Region of the Czech Republic. It has about 1,000 inhabitants.

Prštice lies approximately 15 kilometres (9 mi) south-west of Brno and 183 km (114 mi) south-east of Prague.

== Demographics ==
Historical population
Year	Pop.	±%
1869	493	—
1880	503	+2.0%
1890	536	+6.6%
1900	582	+8.6%
1910	627	+7.7%
1921	754	+20.3%
1930	921	+22.1%
1950	995	+8.0%
1961	1,068	+7.3%
1970	985	−7.8%
1980	909	−7.7%
1991	901	−0.9%
2001	892	−1.0%
2011	934	+4.7%
2021	959	+2.7%
Source: Censuses
