= Sentice =

- Municipality
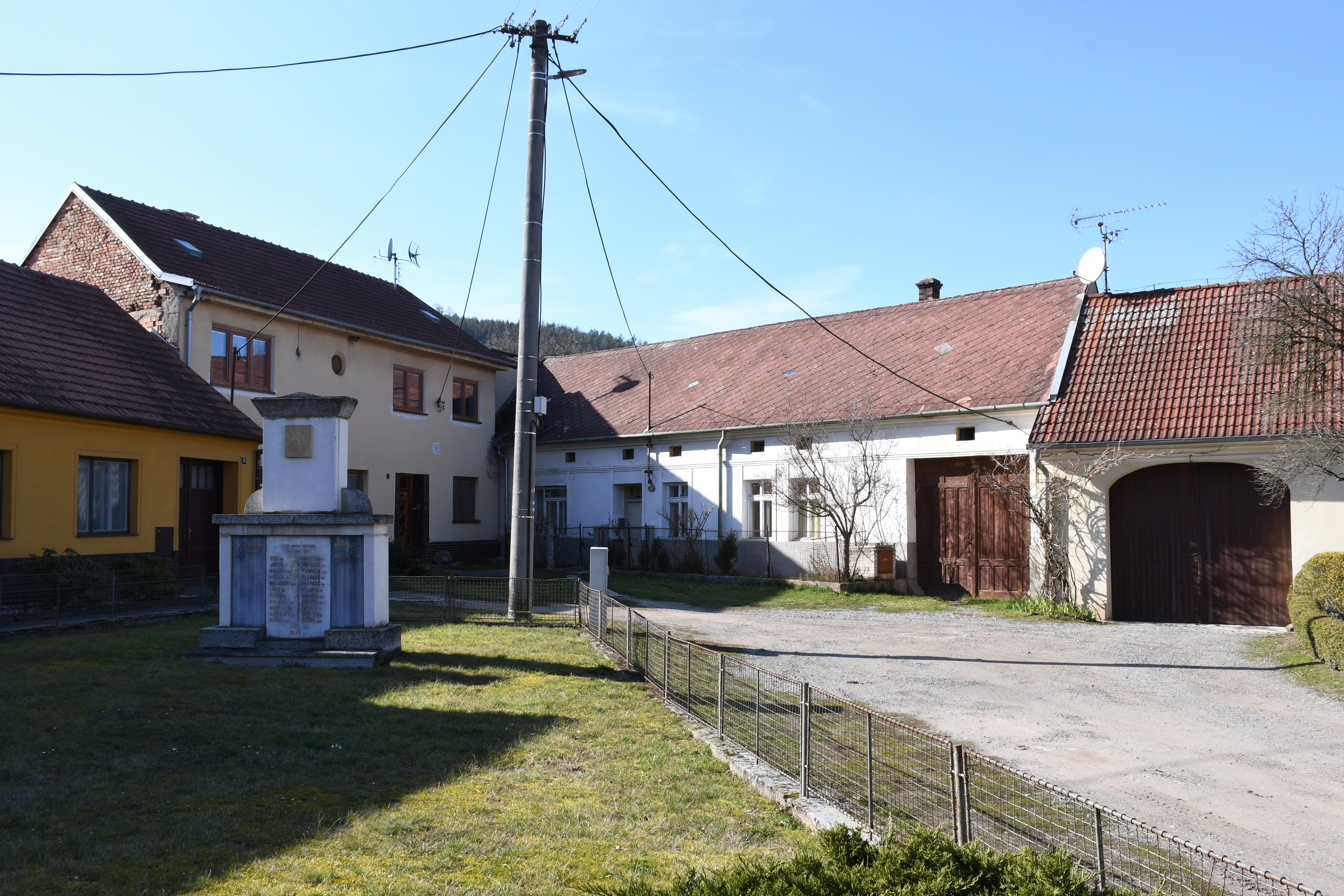
- Monument to the victims of wars

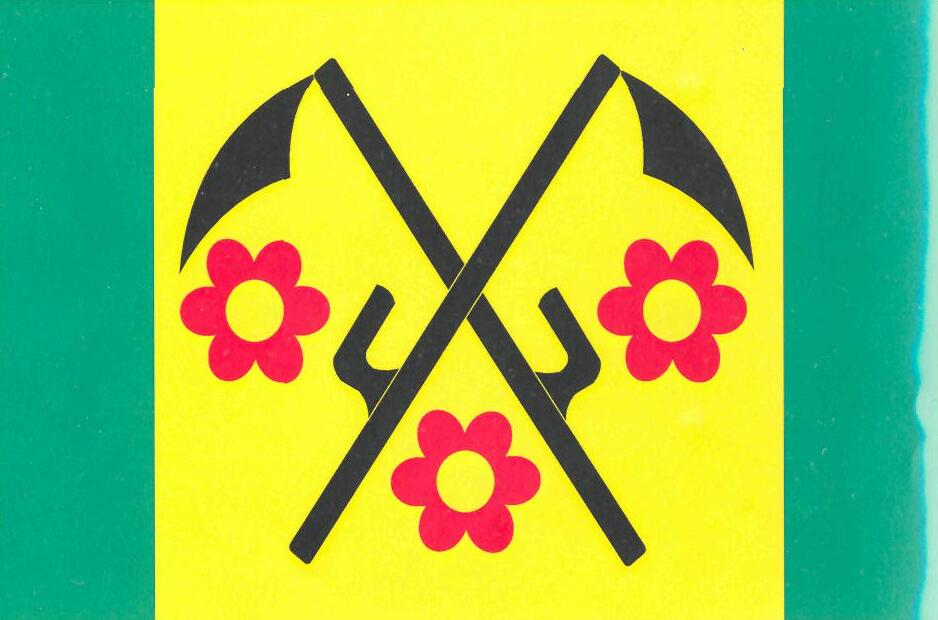
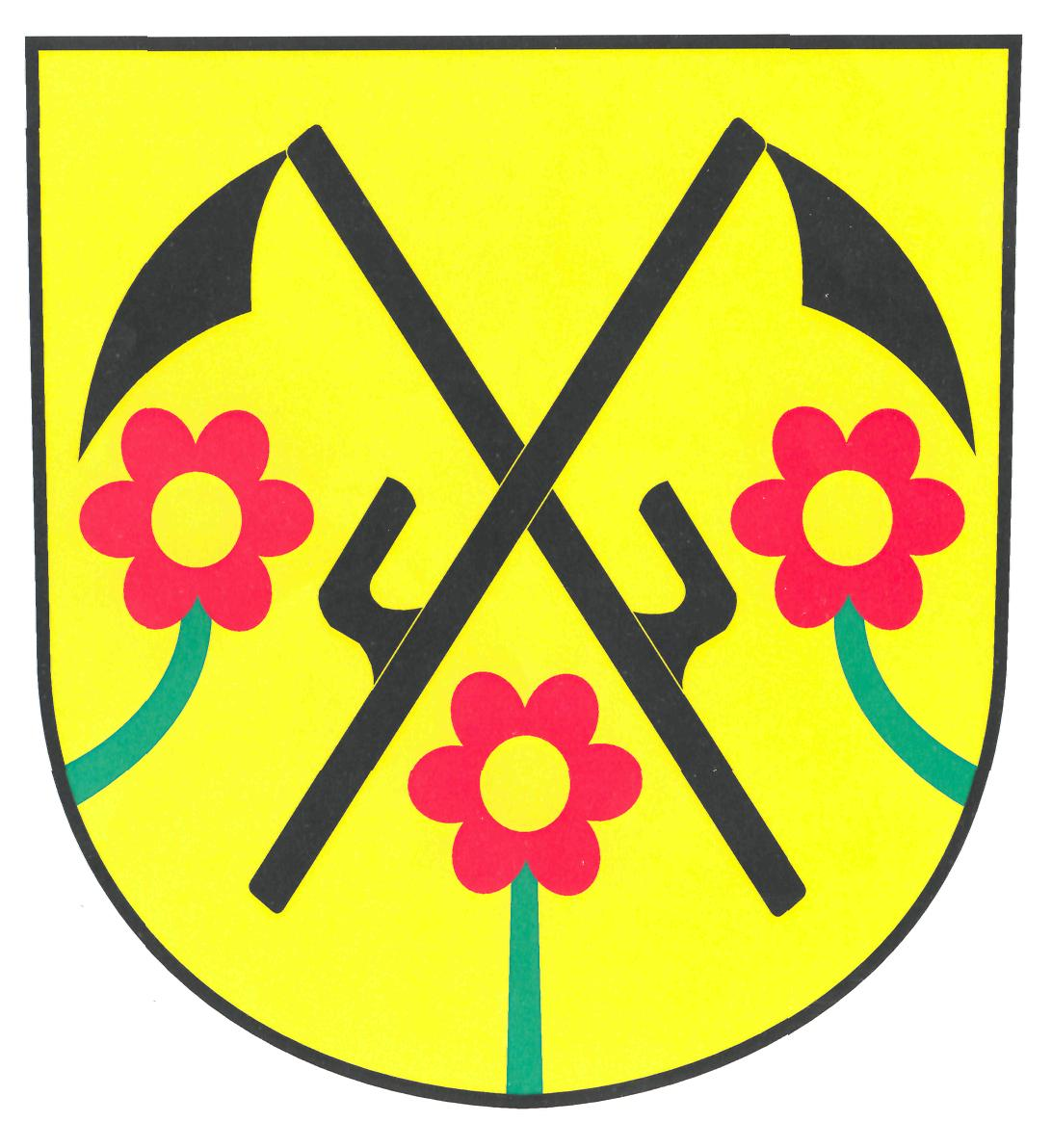
- Flag Coat of arms

- Location in the Czech Republic
- Coordinates: 49°18′39″N 16°26′48″E
- Country: Czech Republic
- Region: South Moravian
- District: Brno-Country
- First mentioned: 1358

Area
  - Total: 9.28 km^{2} (3.58 sq mi)
- Elevation: 308 m (1,010 ft)

Population (2026-01-01)
  - Total: 678
  - Density: 73.1/km^{2} (189/sq mi)
- Time zone: UTC+1 (CET)
  - Summer (DST): UTC+2 (CEST)
- Postal code: 666 03
- Website: www.sentice.cz

Sentice is a municipality and village in Brno-Country District in the South Moravian Region of the Czech Republic. It has about 700 inhabitants.

Sentice lies approximately 17 kilometres (11 mi) north-west of Brno and 171 km (106 mi) south-east of Prague.

== Demographics ==
Historical population
Year	Pop.	±%
1869	406	—
1880	500	+23.2%
1890	491	−1.8%
1900	530	+7.9%
1910	549	+3.6%
1921	533	−2.9%
1930	512	−3.9%
1950	587	+14.6%
1961	572	−2.6%
1970	543	−5.1%
1980	465	−14.4%
1991	418	−10.1%
2001	473	+13.2%
2011	591	+24.9%
2021	664	+12.4%
Source: Censuses
