= Brno-Kníničky =

- City District of Brno
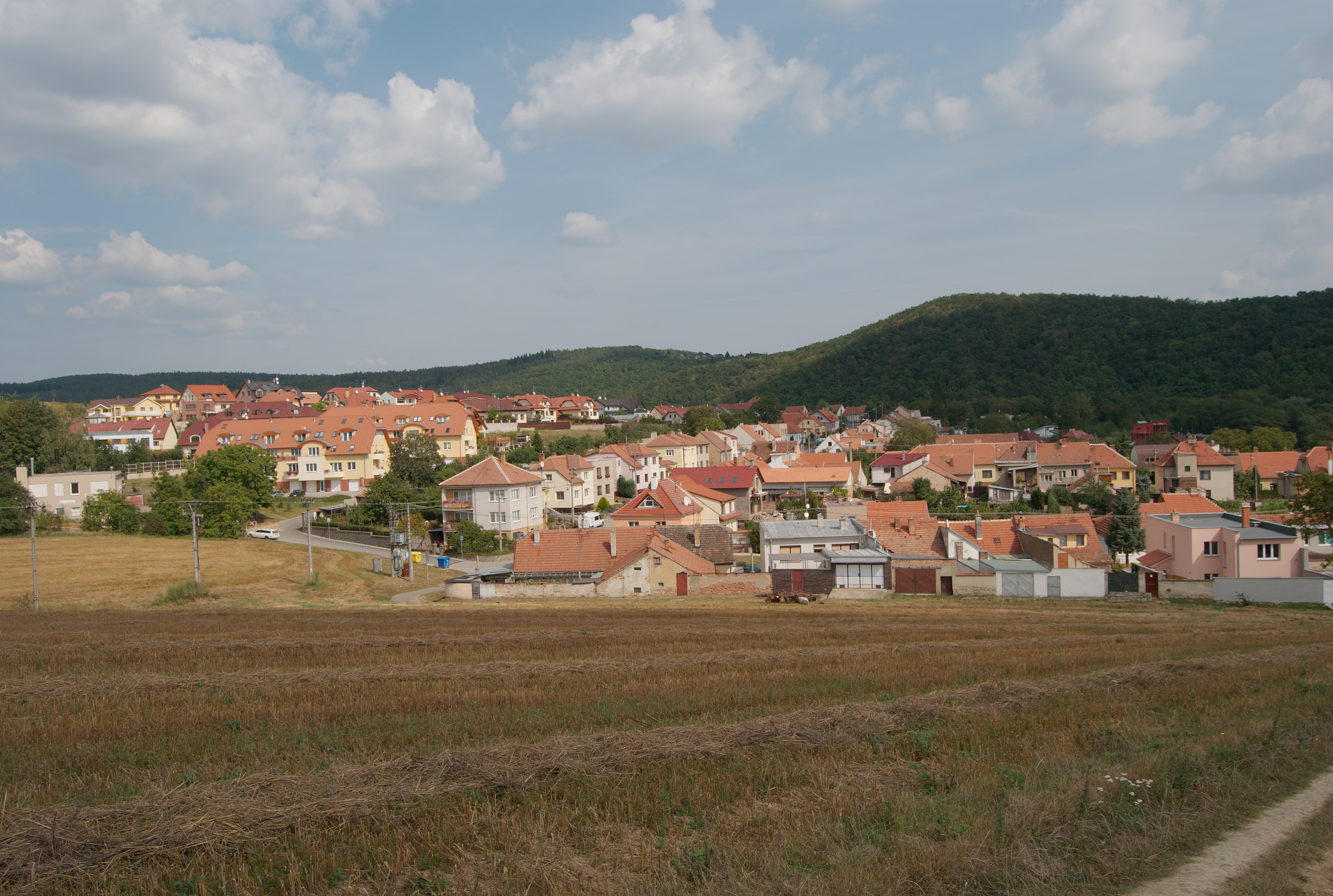
- View of Kníničky from the west

- Flag Coat of arms

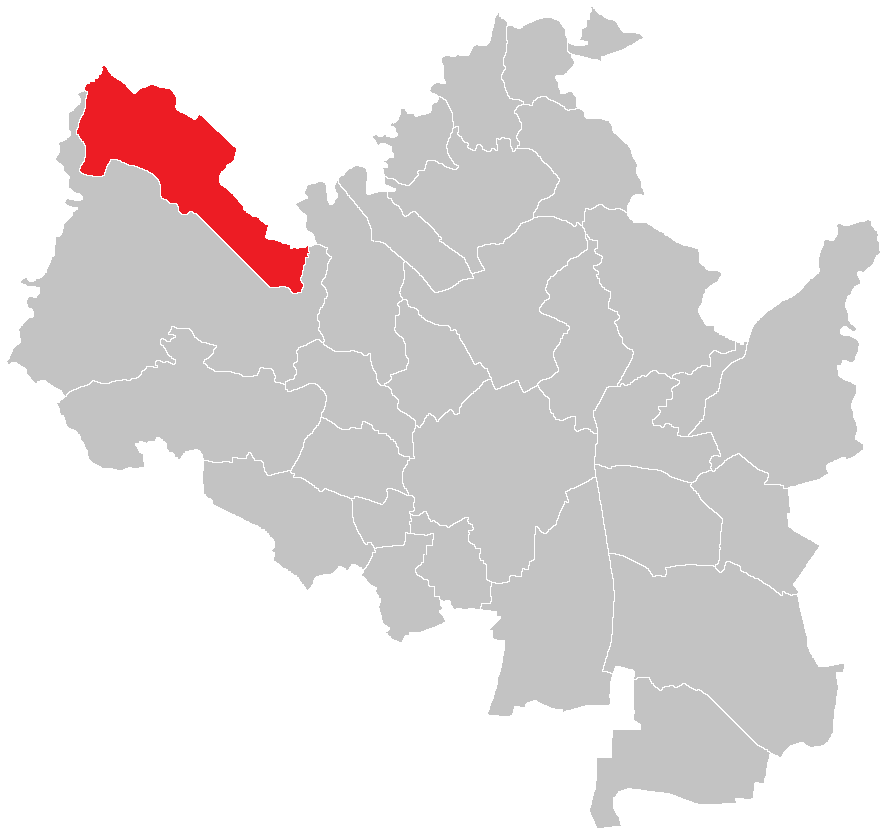
- Location of Brno-Kníničky in Brno
- Coordinates: 49°14′10″N 16°31′40″E
- Country: Czech Republic
- Region: South Moravian
- City: Brno

Government
  - Mayor: Lenka Ištvanová

Area
  - Total: 10.93 km^{2} (4.22 sq mi)

Population (2023)
  - Total: 1,140
  - Density: 104/km^{2} (270/sq mi)
- Time zone: UTC+1 (CET)
  - Summer (DST): UTC+2 (CEST)
- Postal code: 635 00
- Website: www.kninicky.eu

Brno-Kníničky is a city district on the northwestern edge of the city of Brno, Czech Republic. It consists of the municipal part and cadastral territory of Kníničky (German: Klein Kinitz), originally a municipality that was annexed into Brno in 1960. Its covers an area of 10.93 km^{2}. The city district was established on 24 November 1990. It has about 1,100 inhabitants.

== Name ==
Historical development of the name Kníničky is as follows:

- 1436 - Malé Knehyničky
- 1475 - Malé Knihničky
- 1538 - Malé Knihniczky
- 1559 - Malé Knijhniczky
- 1573 - Malé Knihniczky
- 1609 - Kynicžky
- 1611 - Malé Kinitcki
- 1674 - Klein Künitz
- 1718 - Klein Künitz
- 1720 - Maly Kinižky
- 1728 - Parvo Kinitio
- 1751 - Klein Kunitz
- 1846 - Klein Künitz
- 1872 - Klein Kinitz
- 1872 - Kyničky
- 1924 - Kníničky

== History ==
Kníničky acquired its current boundaries during the cadastral reform of Brno in the second half of the 1960s, gaining a small part of Bystrc, the cancelled cadastral territories of Moravské Knínice I and Rozdrojovice I, a small part of Veverská Bítýška I and the northern part of Chudčice I. for a change, the eastern part of Kníničky along the Mniší potok was moved to Bystrc. On July 15, 1976, Kníničky was annexed into the Brno II district, within which it remained until 1990, when Kníničky became the current city district of Brno-Kníničky.

The main topics of local discourse today include the construction of the D43 motorway and the project for a new entrance area to the Brno Zoo.

== Geography ==
Kníničky, located by the Brno Reservoir on the left bank of the river Svratka, still retains its village character. Kníničky's built-up area is located at the eastern border of the city district at the foot of Mniší hora. Kníničky also includes a part of the Brno Reservoir. Approximately two-thirds of Kníničky is covered by Podkomorské lesy, which extends west of the built-up area.

Brno-Kníničky borders the municipality of Rozdrojovice in the north, the city district of Brno-Bystrc in the east, south and southwest, the municipality of Veverská Bítýška in the west, and Chudčice and Moravské Knínice in the northwest.

For the purposes of the Senate elections, Brno-Kníničky is included in electoral district 55 of Brno-City District.

== Territorial divisions ==
The cadastral territory of Kníničky is further divided into 5 basic settlement units.

Basic settlement unit	Population		
Basic settlement unit	2011	2021	Change
Kníničky	924	884	-4.3%
Sokolské koupaliště	49	145	+195.9%
Líchy	29	68	+134.5%
Trnůvka	3	8	+166.7%
Pod Trnůvkou	1	0	-100.0%
Zouvalka	0	0	-

== Demographics ==
Historical population

Year	Pop.	±%
1869	445	—
1880	458	+2.9%
1890	510	+11.4%
1900	508	−0.4%
1910	570	+12.2%

Year	Pop.	±%
1921	537	−5.8%
1930	527	−1.9%
1950	636	+20.7%
1961	734	+15.4%
1970	651	−11.3%

Year	Pop.	±%
1980	570	−12.4%
1991	549	−3.7%
2001	513	−6.6%
2011	1,006	+96.1%
2021	1,105	+9.8%

Source: Censuses

== Transport ==
The bus lines 302 and N89 (night time only) go through Kníničky.
