= Lažánky =

Lažánky may refer to places in the Czech Republic:

- Lažánky (Brno-Country District), a municipality and village in the South Moravian Region
- Lažánky (Strakonice District), a municipality and village in the South Bohemian Region
- Lažánky, a village and part of Blansko in the South Moravian Region
- Lažánky, a village and part of Klatovy in the Plzeň Region
