= Marie Kudeříková =

Czech resistance fighter

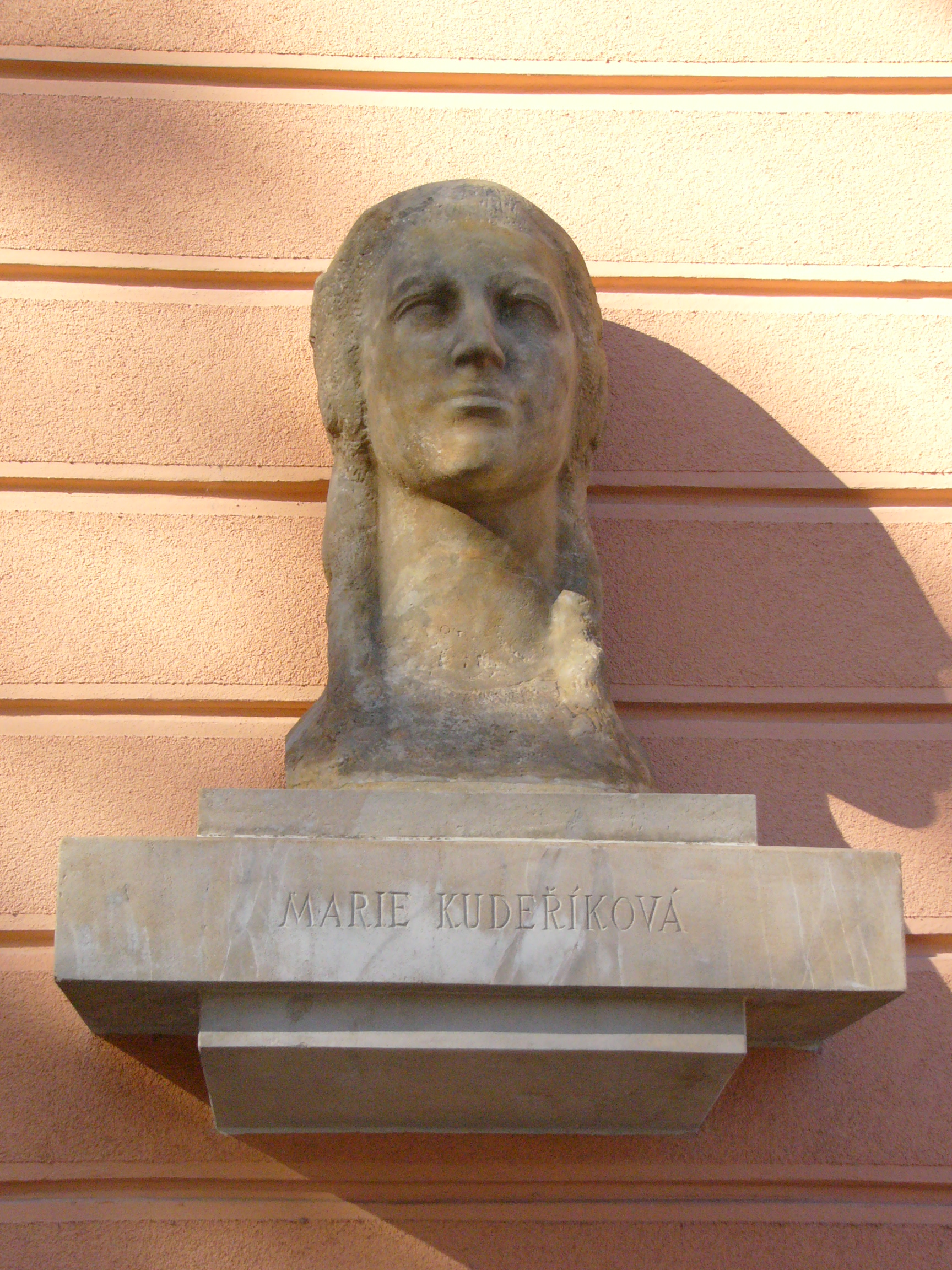
Bust of Marie Kudeříková by Vojtěch Hořínek from 1966 in Olomouc

Marie Kudeříková (also known as Maruška Kudeříková) (24 March 1921, Vnorovy, Czechoslovakia – 26 March 1943 Wrocław, Nazi Germany (today Poland)) was a student active in the Czech resistance to Nazi occupation during World War II. In 1941 she was arrested by Gestapo and at a subsequent trial she was sentenced to death. She was executed in 1943. While in prison, she wrote 32 letters, later published under the title "Zlomky života: listy z vězení" (Fragments of Life: Letters from Prison). Kudeříková was a sympathizer of communist ideas and the Communist Party of Czechoslovakia later used her legacy as its propaganda tool. Her life story was featured in the film And Give My Love to the Swallows by the Czech director Jaromil Jireš.

== Biography ==
Kudeříková was born to a Catholic family in Vnorovy, South Moravia. Her father, Josef Kudeřík, was a member of the Czechoslovak Legions in Russia. During the difficult period of the German occupation of Czechoslovakia he actively participated in anti-German activities in south-eastern Moravia. At that time, his oldest daughter Marie began attending gymnasium in Strážnice. There she befriended Julius Kramarič, a young supporter of communist ideas who came to the school from the Slovakia. Under his influence, she found an interest in Marxist ideas, which caused a conflict in her religious family. She later commented: "Julek (meant Julius) laid the theoretical foundation of my whole future work." They both graduated in 1940, at the time when Germans decided to close Czech universities. Kudeříková went to study in a language school in Brno and Kramarič left Vnorovy. The pair broke up shortly before that, which Kudeříková later mentioned with pain in her letters from prison.

The language school was moved from Brno to Veverská Bítýška, and at that time Kudeříková joined the Youth Union, an organization closely connected to the banned Central Committee of the Communist Party. She helped to organize the production of banned publications and posters. She once even attempted to burn down a local factory warehouse. Later she focused her activities on carrying out sabotage with a group of young people from surrounding towns and villages. In mid-1941, during a wave of arrests, she found a shelter in the village of Lažánky. In autumn of the same year she left for Brno, where she continued her activities in the Youth Union.

Kudeříková was arrested by the Gestapo on 5 December 1941 in Brno. The interrogations took place in Brno and Prague and the trial was held on 16 November 1942 in Wrocław (then Breslau). Both her parents attended the trial. She was sentenced to death by beheading. After that she spent more than 100 days in prison waiting for the execution. During her imprisonment, she worked as a painter of children's toys and began writing the recollections of her life in the form of letters. She managed to secretly send her letters out of the prison with the help of a friend and a prison guard. Kudeříková was executed on 26 March 1943, two days after her 22nd birthday. In her last letter, written the same day, she wrote: "Farewell to you, I greet, I love. Do not weep, I'm not crying. Without wailing, without a tremor of fear, without pain I leave, I come to what should be the goal, not the means." The brutal method of her execution (beheading by axe) shocked Czech society, although it was illegal to talk about the circumstances of her case.

After the liberation of Czechoslovakia and the subsequent establishment of the communist regime, her life story and heroism became a suitable theme for the political and ideological education of young generations living under the communist regime. Kudeříková appeared as an important historical personality in the textbooks of Czechoslovak schools.

Following the fall of the communist regime in Czechoslovakia, the legacy of Maruška Kudeříková was questioned in a documentary made by Czech Television. Among other things, the documentary notes that a poorly organized resistance action arranged by Kudeříková and her collaborators led to the imprisonment of many innocent persons in Nazi concentration camps.

== Marie Kudeříková in fiction ==
- Zlomky života (Fragments of Life, 1961) - afterword by Mojmír Grygar
- Jiří Havel: Šestý den jara - verses
- František Omelka: Maruška - short story
- Lumír Kuchař: Zlomky života a smrti (Fragments of Life and Death)
- … a pozdravuji vlaštovky (And Give My Love to the Swallows, 1972) - film directed by Jaromil Jireš
- Památky na mě... - documentary, 2002, 28 min., directed by Jan Novák
