= Brno Reservoir =

- Brněnská přehrada (Czech)
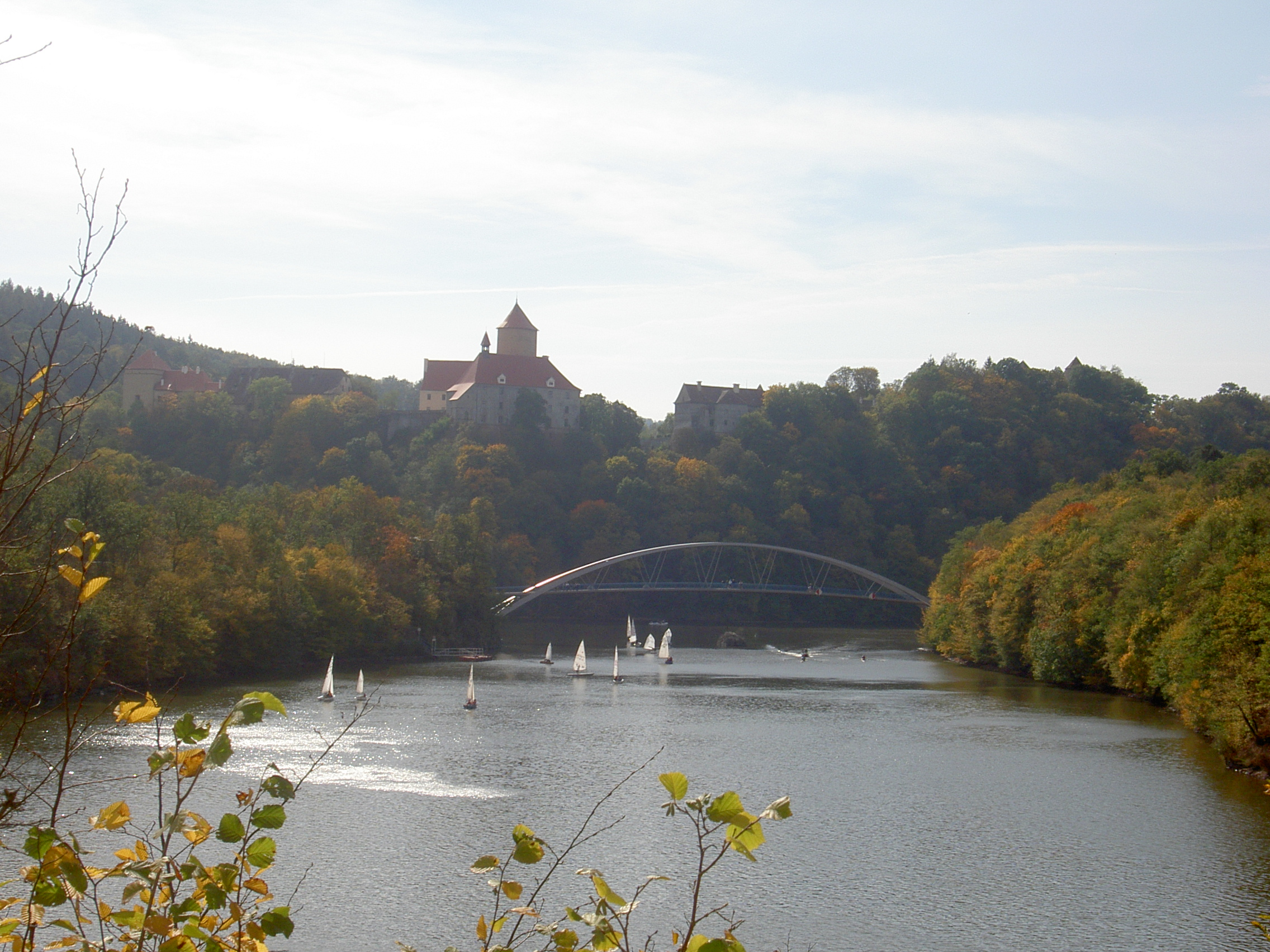
- View of Brno Reservoir

- Location within Czech Republic
- Location: Brno, South Moravia
- Coordinates: 49°14′18″N 16°30′29″E
- Type: reservoir
- Primary inflows: Svratka
- Primary outflows: Svratka
- Basin countries: Czech Republic
- Surface area: 259 hectares (640 acres)
- Average depth: 23.5 metres (77 ft)
- Water volume: 7.6×10^{6} m^{3} (6,200 acre⋅ft)
- Surface elevation: 233.72 metres (766.8 ft)
- Settlements: Brno

The Brno Reservoir, previously known as the Kníničky Reservoir (Czech: Brněnská přehrada, also known as Prýgl in Hantec slang) is a reservoir on the Svratka River at the northwest edge of the city of Brno, Czech Republic. The construction of a dam on the 56th kilometre of the Svratka River, and the resultant flooding of the river valley containing the village of Kníničky, created the reservoir. The reservoir used to serve as a water reserve for Brno (water from the Vír Reservoir and from wells in Březová nad Svitavou are used today). It remains a place for recreation, and also a source of electric power. The administrator of the Brno Reservoir is the state-owned enterprise Povodí Moravy, s.p.

== Basic information ==
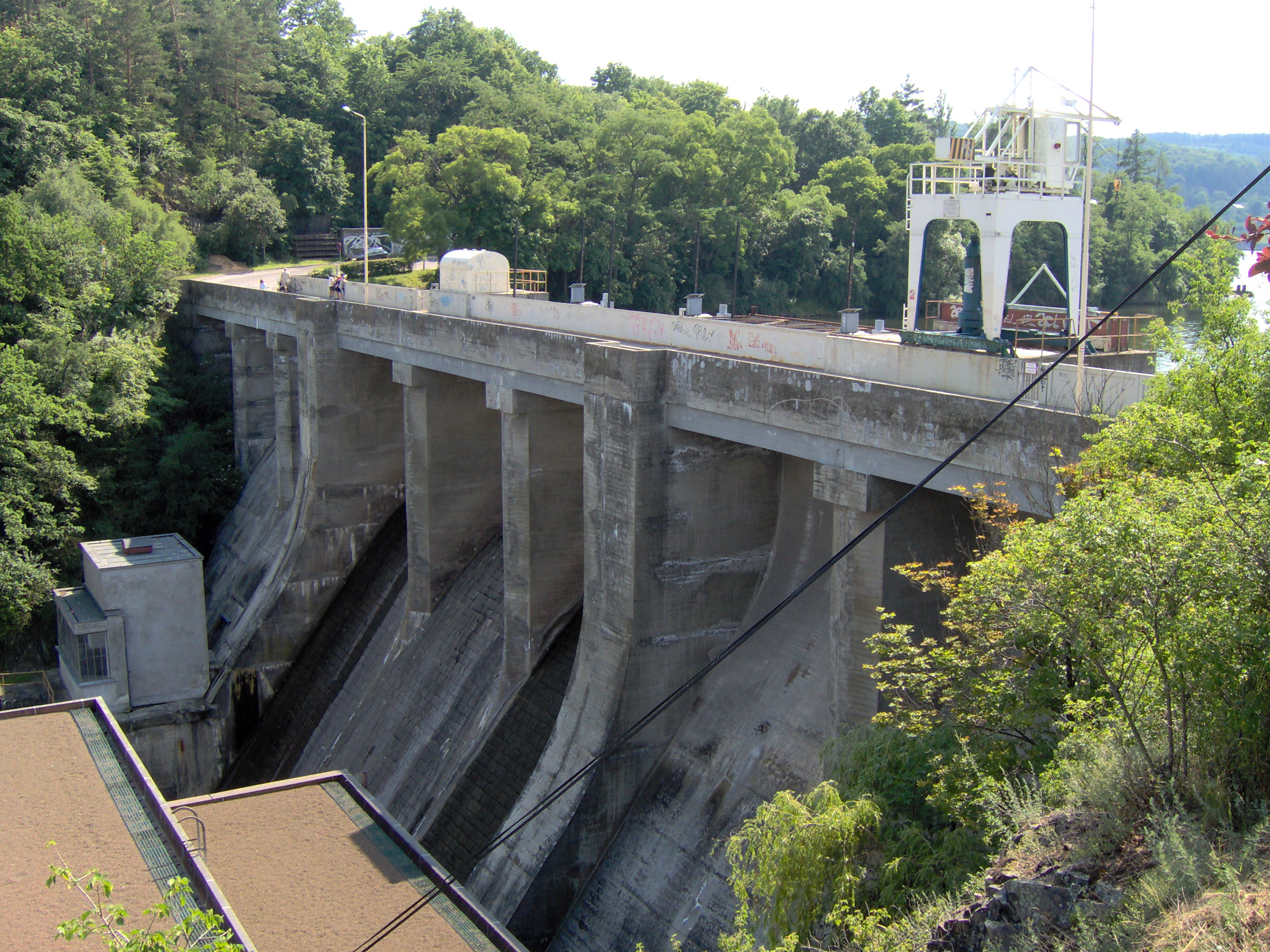
Brno Dam

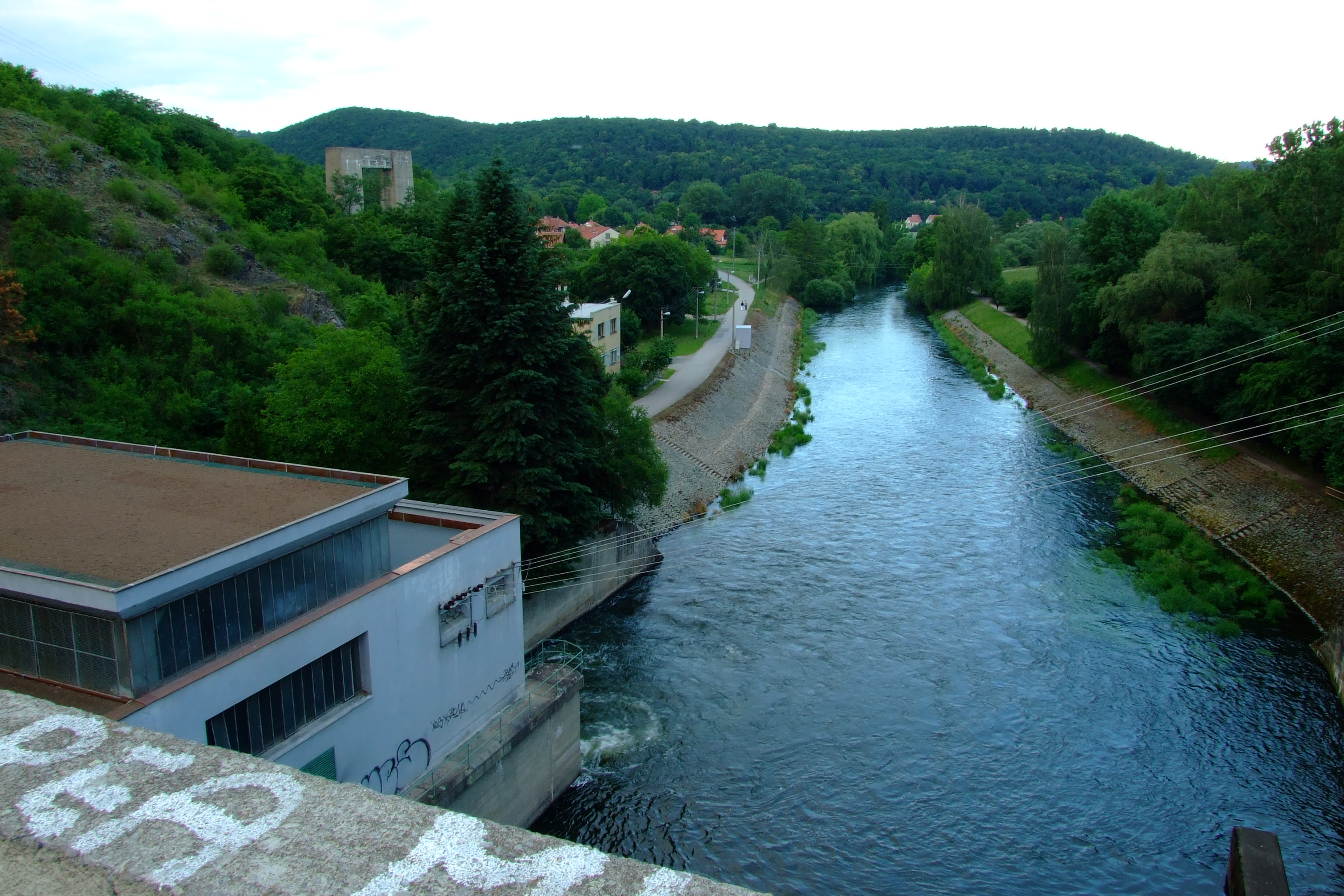
View from the levee

Creating a dam on the Svratka River was first proposed at the beginning of the 20th century; however, the idea was not realized until 1936–1940. The main investor was the then Ministry of Public Works. Apart from the city of Brno, Země Moravskoslezská (the former province-level government) took a financial interest of 25% in its construction.

The swell of the reservoir begins under the weir at the Tejkalův Mill in Veverská Bítýška and spans nearly 10 km to the dam on the border of the Brno-Bystrc and Brno-Kníničky districts. The flooded area covers 259 ha. The inactive storage reaches up to 7.6 million m³; the reserve space is 10.8 million m³. The concrete dam is 7.14 m wide at its crown and 120 m long. It rises 23.5 m above the river bottom at an altitude of 233.72 m.

The hydroelectric plant uses one Kaplan turbine with an output of 2.88 MW (the installed output is 3.1 MW). In case of an island operation (in other words, if the plant is disconnected from the network system, such as in the case of a breakdown of the electric power transmission), the turbine can be used to set a gas combustion turbine in the heating plant “Červený mlýn” in motion. A small hydro in Brno-Komín serves as a buffer tank.

At the end of the Second World War the retreating German Army placed mines in the nearby roads, placed a barrel with trinitrotoluene on the dam (the explosives were originally supposed to be placed into the dam piping, but it was sealed with concrete due to an order to protect it from sabotage), and stationed some machine guns in the house of the dam guard Šikula. Šikula, together with a few people hidden in the power plant room, warned a convoy of the Red Army about the German plans and prevented the dam from being destroyed. Šikula was shot and wounded. There is a plaque in his honor at the dam today.

== Tourism ==
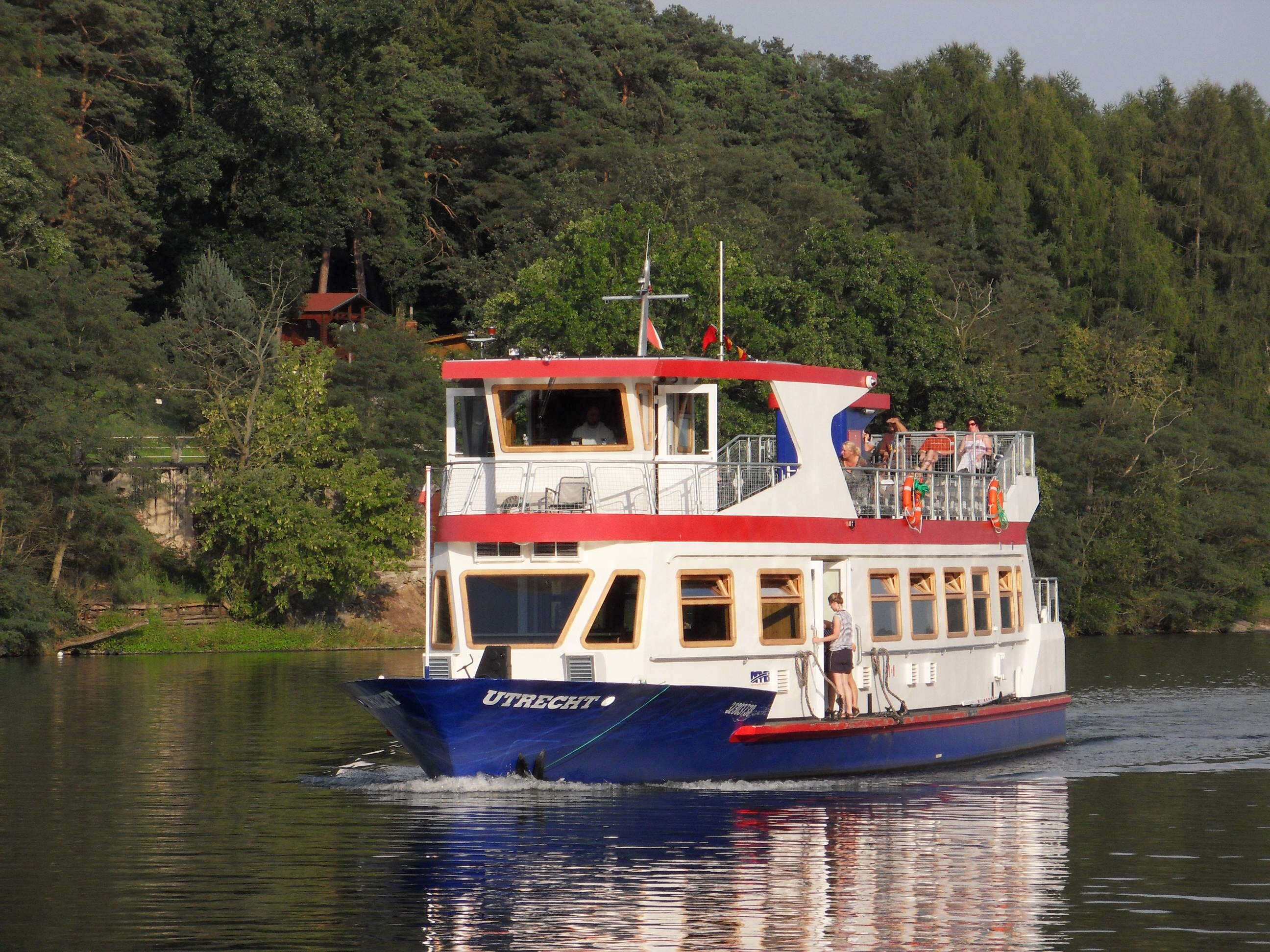
One of the newest boats on the reservoir

Brno Reservoir is a popular recreational area with both locals and visitors. There are vast forests on both sides of the reservoir and thus there are opportunities not only for swimming and water sports, but also hiking and cycling. The Veveří Castle, overlooking the water close to Veverská Bítýška, is a popular destination for tourists. There is a bridge for cyclists and hikers over the reservoir close to the castle.

The reservoir can be visited all year round. Swimming in the water is safe. Cyanobacteria very rarely occur on the more popular southern end of the reservoir.

== Culture ==
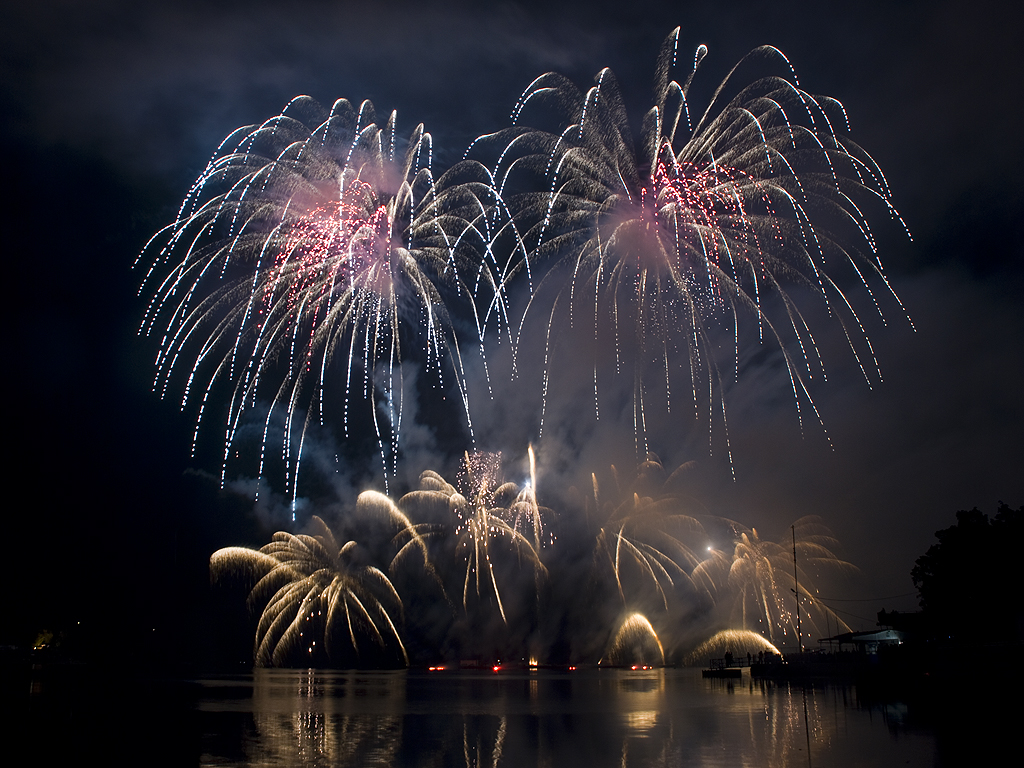
Fireworks competition Ignis Brunensis

An important international firework competition, Ignis Brunensis, is held annually at the end of May and beginning of June at the reservoir.

== Pollution ==
As a result of water pollution by communal sewage, the reservoir suffered from an extensive amount of cyanobacteria for a long time. In 2010 the reservoir underwent a series of chemical cleanings designed to eliminate the bacteria. These cleanings remain a subject of criticism and dispute, as some people claim they were nothing more than a pre-election trick, and that they will not bring sufficient long-term results. Since 2011, however, the water in the reservoir has been suitable for swimming.

In 2018 the water quality in the reservoir dropped again, and in July it was declared unsuitable for swimming. Part of the cause was extremely dry and hot weather and delayed application of chemical substances against bacteria.

== Boat rides ==
The Brno Public Transportation Office operates boat rides on the reservoir during the summer season. The boats run from Bystrc harbour (“Přístaviště”) to Veveří Castle, and sometimes continue to Veverská Bítýška (depending on the water level). The newest boats are named Dallas, Lipsko, Stuttgart, Utrecht and Vídeň (after Dallas, Leipzig, Stuttgart, Utrecht and Vienna, Brno's twin cities); and the older ones are called Brno and Morava. The boats run every 45 minutes. Tickets can be purchased at the harbour at the ticket office.

== Sport ==
The reservoir serves as a popular place for sports. Apart from canoeing, water skiing, and yachting, the reservoir is also used for rowing. Several rowing clubs operate there, such as ČVK Brno (Czech Rowing Club Brno) or TJ Lodní sporty Brno (TJ Water Sports Brno). The most famous member of the latter is Miroslava Knapková, the winner in rowing at the 2012 Olympics.

== Events ==
Since 2011 there have been disputes over the planned construction of a wakeboarding track.
