= Jan Skácel =

Czech poet (1922–1989)

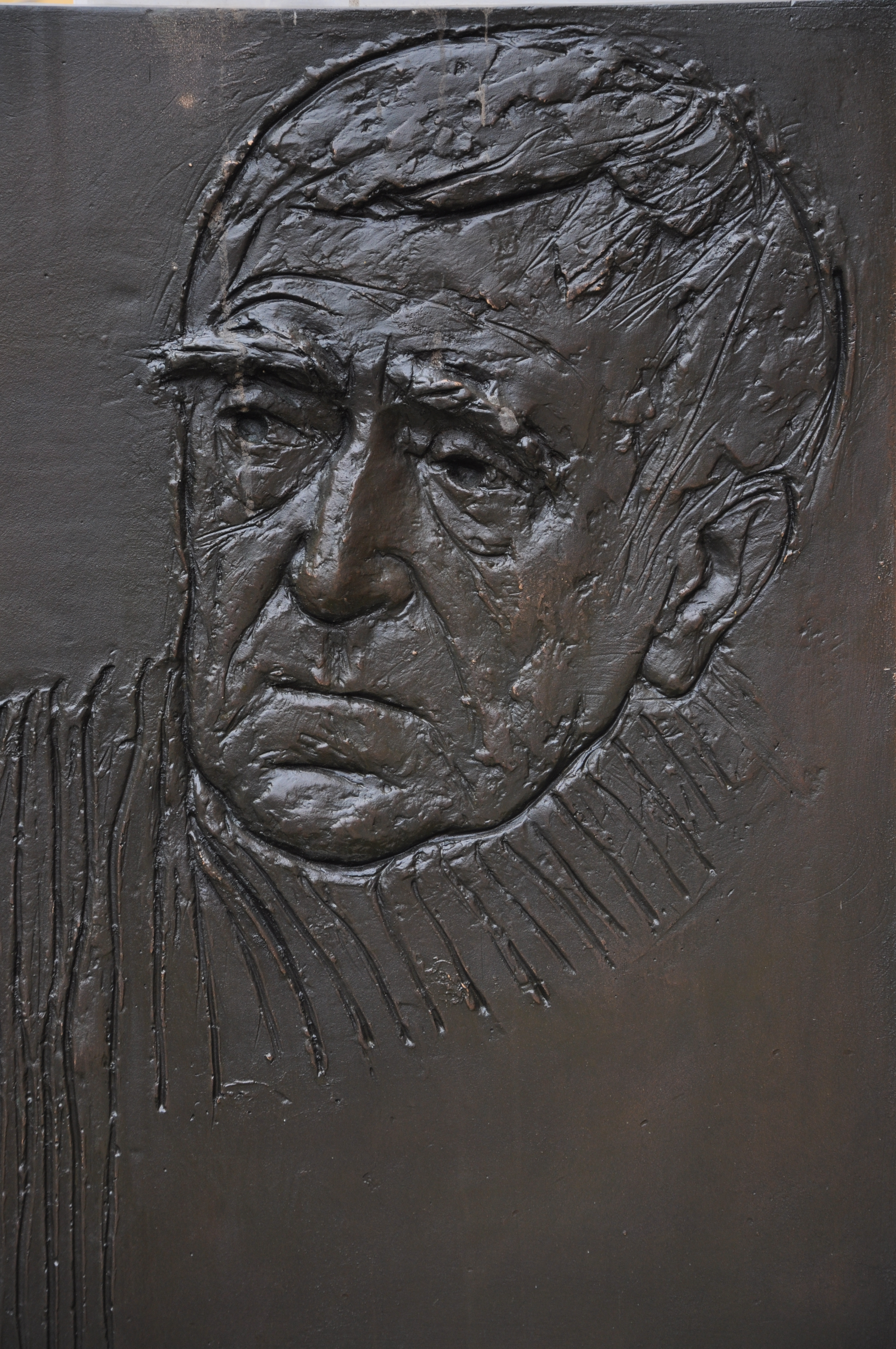
Memorial plaque in Brno

Jan Skácel (7 February 1922 – 7 November 1989) was a Czech poet, widely acclaimed as one of the best poets who had been writing in Czech.

== Biography ==
Skácel was born in Vnorovy on 7 February 1922.

He often juxtaposed the fear stoked by the communist regime in Czechoslovakia and the highly free syntax of Czech language. His poems are closely connected to the traditions and the nature of the region he lived in, South Moravia. His poems were mentioned in the book Ignorance written by Milan Kundera.

Skácel was the editor of Host do domu, an important literary magazine between 1963 and 1969. He was awarded the German international literary Petrarca-Preis and Slovenian international Vilenica prize in 1989.

When in 1996 she won the Georg-Büchner Prize for literature, the German poet Sarah Kirsch named Skácel as a major influence.

Skácel died in Brno on 7 November 1989.

== Works ==
=== Poetry ===
- Kolik příležitostí má růže Prague, 1957 (How many chances the rose has)
- Co zbylo z anděla Prague, 1960 (What remained of angel)
- Hodina mezi psem a vlkem Prague, 1962 (An hour between dog and wolf)
- Smuténka Prague, 1965 (title is neologism with root "smutný" = sad, it associates botanic name)
- Vítr jménem Jaromír Prague, 1966 (Wind called Jaromír)
- Metličky Prague, 1968 (Little whisks)
- Tratidla Brno, 1974 (neologism with root "tratit" = to lose, it associates toponyme)
- Dávné proso Brno, 1981 (Ancient Millet)
- Naděje s bukovými křídly Prague, 1983 (Hope with Wings of Beech)
- Odlévání do ztraceného vosku Brno, 1984 (Lost-wax casting)
- Kdo pije potmě víno Brno, 1988 (Drinker of wine in the dark)
- A znovu láska Brno, 1991 (Love again)

=== Prose ===
- Jedenáctý bílý kůň Brno 1966 (The eleventh white horse)
- Třináctý černý kůň Brno 1993 (The thirteenth black horse)
