= Vnorovy =

- Municipality
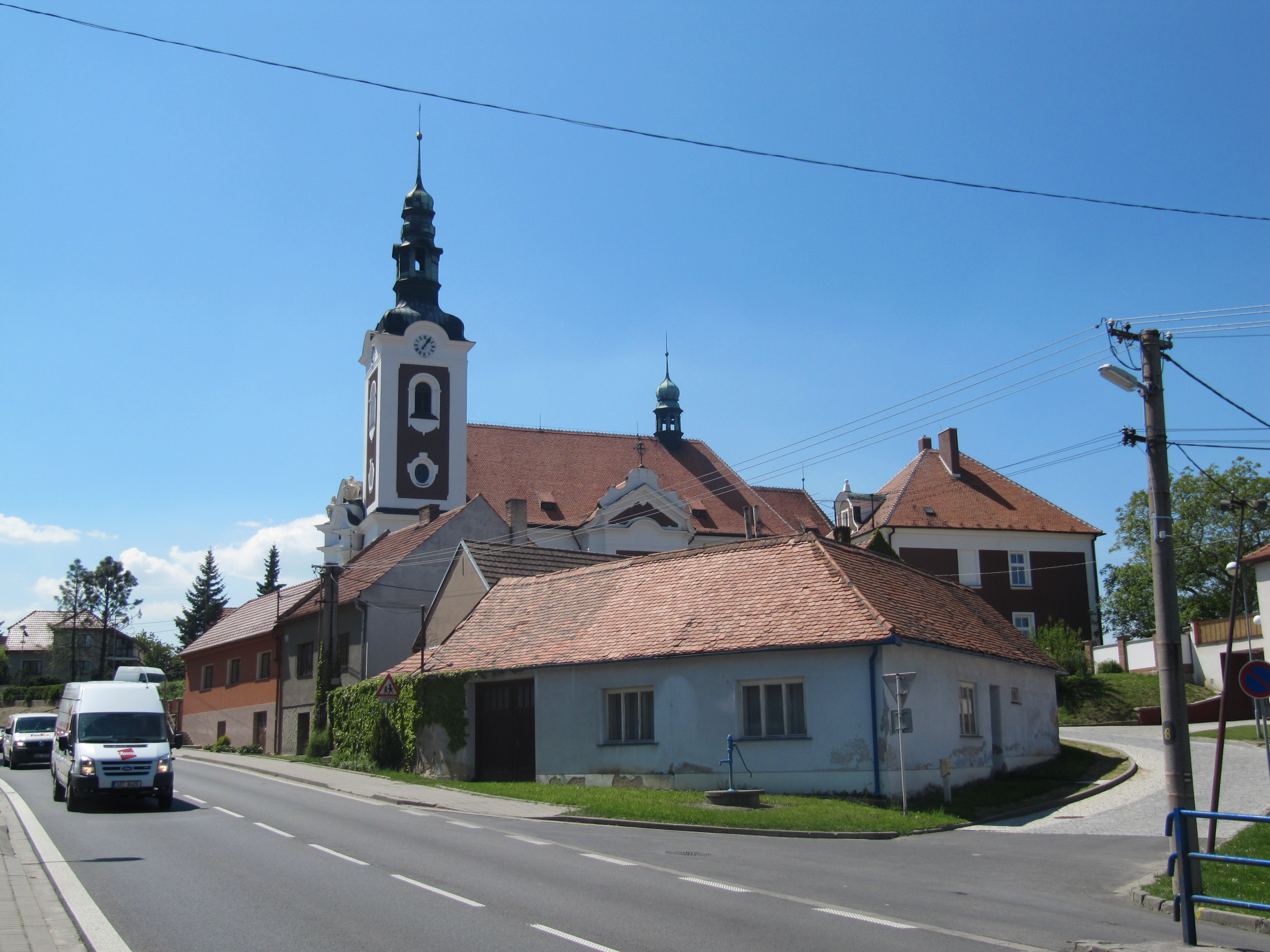
- Main street and the Church of Saint Elizabeth

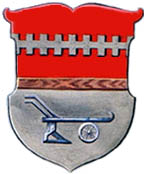
- Flag Coat of arms

- Location in the Czech Republic
- Coordinates: 48°55′52″N 17°21′2″E
- Country: Czech Republic
- Region: South Moravian
- District: Hodonín
- First mentioned: 1275

Area
  - Total: 16.88 km^{2} (6.52 sq mi)
- Elevation: 182 m (597 ft)

Population (2026-01-01)
  - Total: 2,914
  - Density: 172.6/km^{2} (447.1/sq mi)
- Time zone: UTC+1 (CET)
  - Summer (DST): UTC+2 (CEST)
- Postal code: 696 61
- Website: www.vnorovy.cz

Vnorovy is a municipality and village in Hodonín District in the South Moravian Region of the Czech Republic. It has about 2,900 inhabitants.

== Administrative division ==
Vnorovy consists of two municipal parts (in brackets population according to the 2021 census):

- Vnorovy (2,036)
- Lidéřovice (783)

== Geography ==
Vnorovy is located about 18 kilometres (11 mi) northeast of Hodonín and 60 km (37 mi) southeast of Brno. It lies on the border between the Vizovice Highlands and the Lower Morava Valley. The highest point is at 227 m (745 ft) above sea level. The Baťa Canal flows through the municipality. The Velička River flows along the southern municipal border.

== History ==
The first written mention of Vnorovy is in a hoax that was created between 1267 and 1275. Lidéřovice was first mentioned in 1412. In 1673, Vnorovy was promoted to a market town, but later lost the title. The village and formerly independent municipality of Lidéřovice, which is urbanistically fused with Vnorovy, joined Vnorovy in 1960.

== Demographics ==
Historical population

Year	Pop.	±%
1869	2,213	—
1880	2,637	+19.2%
1890	2,701	+2.4%
1900	2,951	+9.3%
1910	3,179	+7.7%

Year	Pop.	±%
1921	2,992	−5.9%
1930	2,789	−6.8%
1950	2,630	−5.7%
1961	3,003	+14.2%
1970	2,987	−0.5%

Year	Pop.	±%
1980	3,035	+1.6%
1991	3,102	+2.2%
2001	3,082	−0.6%
2011	2,950	−4.3%
2021	2,819	−4.4%

Source: Censuses

== Transport ==
Vnorovy is located on the railway line heading from Hodonín to Veselí nad Moravou and Vrbovce, Slovakia.

== Sights ==
The main landmark of Vnorovy is the Church of Saint Elizabeth. The church was first mentioned in 1378. As it was insufficient for the number of believers, it was demolished in 1908. The new larger building, completed in 1909, was built in the neo-Baroque style with Art Nouveau elements.

== Notable people ==
- Marie Kudeříková (1921–1943), resistance fighter
- Jan Skácel (1922–1989), poet
