= Ignis Brunensis =

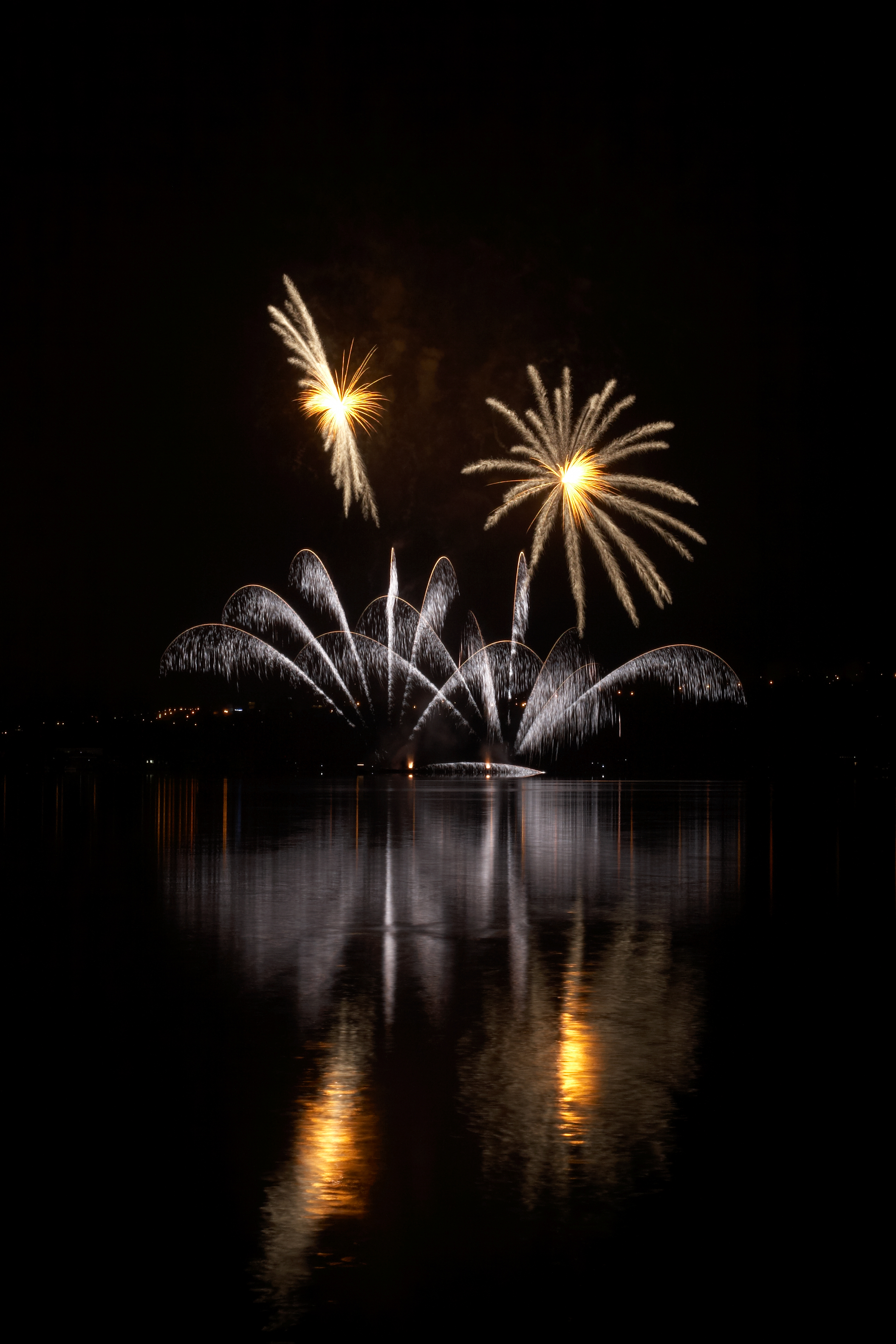
Ignis Brunensis Macedos Pirotecnia 2007

The Ignis Brunensis is an international firework competition held annually at the end of May and beginning of June in Brno, Czech Republic. The name of competition is Latin for Fire of Brno.

== Program ==
The event lasts about two weeks and involves the whole city of Brno. It is introduced by non-competitive fireworks launched from the city centre. From this moment competing fireworks are presented outside the city centre on the nearby Brno Dam where the effect is increased by reflection from the water. Each fireworks show lasts about 22 minutes, with synchronized music broadcast by the local radio station. Shows are held one by one every Wednesday and Saturday. The event attracts from 100,000 to 200,000 visitors. The closing ceremony again includes non-competing fireworks launched from the city centre. Local museums, castles and other institutions also participate in the event, with their own programmes.

== History ==
Ignis Brunensis started in 1998. Until 2002 it was either a national fireworks competition (1998, 2000, 2002) or a non-competitive exhibition (1999, 2001). Since 2003 it has been a significant international competition, with 4 or 5 competing entries.

== Winners ==
Year	Main Prize	Prize of Czech Television "Scene amongst Fire"	Prize of Czech Radio "Music amongst Fire"	People's Choice	Special Prize by the Mayor of Brno for the design of the compulsory part
2003	(Spain) FUEGOS ARTIFICIALES A. CABALLER	(Czech Republic) FLASH BARRANDOV SFX	(Czech Republic) FLASH BARRANDOV SFX	(Spain) FUEGOS ARTIFICIALES A. CABALLER	
2004	(Czech Republic) FLASH BARRANDOV SFX	(Czech Republic) FLASH BARRANDOV SFX	(Czech Republic) FLASH BARRANDOV SFX	(Italy) Panzera	
2006	(Portugal) MACEDO’S PIROTECNIA	(Portugal) MACEDO’S PIROTECNIA	(Czech Republic) FLASH BARRANDOV SFX	(Portugal) MACEDO’S PIROTECNIA	
2007	(Portugal) MACEDO’S PIROTECNIA	(Portugal) MACEDO’S PIROTECNIA	(Portugal) MACEDO’S PIROTECNIA	(South Africa) FIREWORKS FOR AFRICA	
2008	(Czech Republic) FLASH BARRANDOV SFX	(France) FETES & FEUX	(Japan) MARUTAMAYA	(Japan) MARUTAMAYA	
2009	(Portugal) GRUPO LUSO PIROTECNIA	(Austria) PYROVISION	(Portugal) GRUPO LUSO PIROTECNIA	(Portugal) GRUPO LUSO PIROTECNIA	
2010	(Slovakia) PYRA	(Germany) NOCTILUCA	(France) STORM ARTIFICES	(Czech Republic) FLASH BARRANDOV SFX & THEATRUM PYROBOLI	
2011	(Italy) VACCALLUZZO	(France) STORM ARTIFICES	(Italy) VACCALLUZZO	(Italy) VACCALLUZZO	
2012	(Australia) FOTI INTERNATIONAL FIREWORKS	(Spain) PIROTECNIA RICARDO CABALLER	(China) PANDA FIREWORKS	(Australia) FOTI INTERNATIONAL FIREWORKS	(China) PANDA FIREWORKS
2013	(Switzerland) SUGYP	(Switzerland) SUGYP	(Poland) SUREX	(Switzerland) SUGYP	(Poland) SUREX
2014	(Greece) NANOS FIREWORKS	(Croatia) MIRNOVEC PIROTEHNIKA	(Austria) FEUERWERKE JOST	(Croatia) MIRNOVEC PIROTEHNIKA	(Czech Republic) THEATRUM PYROBOLI
2015	(France) ALPHA PYROTECHNIE	(France) ALPHA PYROTECHNIE	(Slovenia) HAMEX PIROTEHNIKA	(Italy) LA TIRRENA FIREWORKS	(Italy) LA TIRRENA FIREWORKS
