= Brno-Bystrc =

- City District of Brno
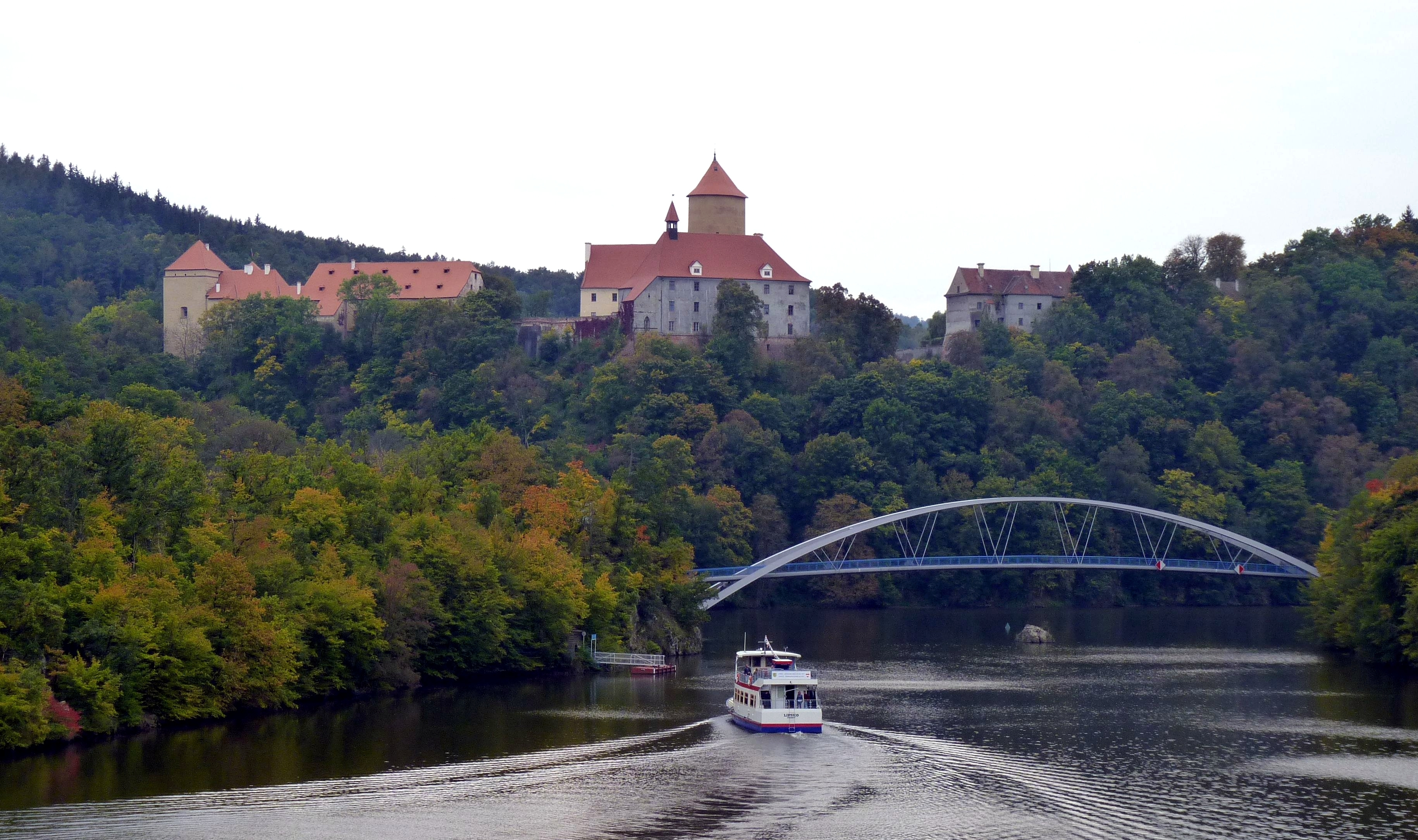
- Veveří Castle and Dam Lake

- Flag Coat of arms

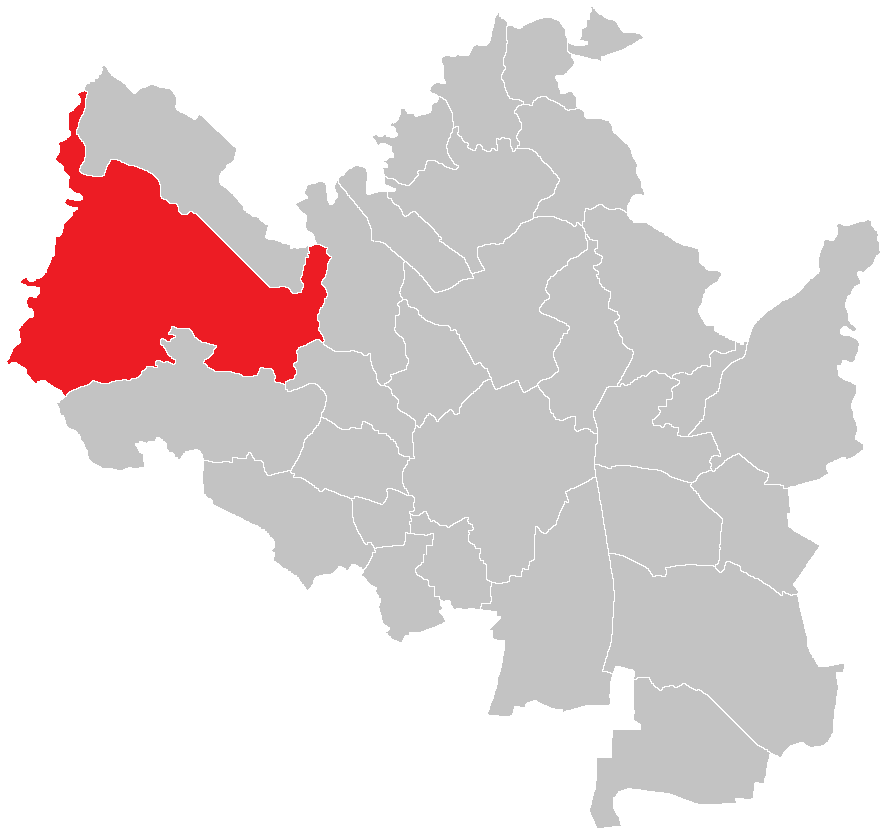
- Location of Bystrc in Brno 49°13′29″N 16°31′26″E
- Country: Czech Republic
- Region: South Moravian Region
- City: Brno

Government
  - Mayor: Tomáš Kratochvíl (ČSSD)

Area
  - Total: 27.26 km^{2} (10.53 sq mi)

Population (2023)
  - Total: 24,655
  - Density: 904.4/km^{2} (2,342/sq mi)
- Time zone: UTC+1 (CET)
  - Summer (DST): UTC+2 (CEST)
- Postal code: 635 00
- Website: http://www.bystrc.cz

Bystrc (Hantec: Bástr) is a city district of Brno in the Czech Republic. It is entirely made up of the cadastral territory of Bystrc, a former village on the banks of the Svratka river, that was incorporated into the city in 1960. The Brno Zoo, Brno Reservoir, Deer Glen Nature Reserve, Krnovec Nature Reserve, Veveří Castle, Monk's Hill and Kopeček Hill (The highest peak in Brno) are located there.

== Territorial divisions ==
The cadastral territory of Bystrc is further divided into 19 basic settlement units.

Basic settlement unit	Population		
Basic settlement unit	2011	2021	Change
Bystrc-jih	5,796	5,614	-3.1%
Foltýnova	4,142	2,661	-35.8%
Hrad Veveří	40	31	-22.5%
Kamechy-východ	497	2,119	+326.4%
Kočičí žleb	0	0	+0%
Kozí horka-Chochola	90	170	+88.9%
Mniší hora	0	1	-
Myslivna-Obora	41	116	+182.9%
Nad Přehradou	-	857	-
Náměstí 28. dubna	1,989	1,652	-16.9%
Pohádka máje	2	3	+50.0%
Polesí Žebětín	2	3	+50.0%
Přístavní	1,801	1,684	-6.5%
Rakovec	628	722	+15.0%
Šťouračova	-	1,253	-
Teyschlova	4,584	3,480	-24.1%
U Vrbovce	-	53	-
Údolí oddechu	256	299	+16.8%
Vejrostova	4,350	3,996	-8.1%

== Demographics ==
Historical population

Year	Pop.	±%
1869	961	—
1880	1,108	+15.3%
1890	1,212	+9.4%
1900	1,322	+9.1%
1910	1,576	+19.2%

Year	Pop.	±%
1921	1,543	−2.1%
1930	1,818	+17.8%
1950	2,177	+19.7%
1961	2,283	+4.9%
1970	2,386	+4.5%

Year	Pop.	±%
1980	14,196	+495.0%
1991	23,593	+66.2%
2001	23,805	+0.9%
2011	24,218	+1.7%
2021	24,714	+2.0%

Source: Censuses
