= Chudčice =

- Municipality
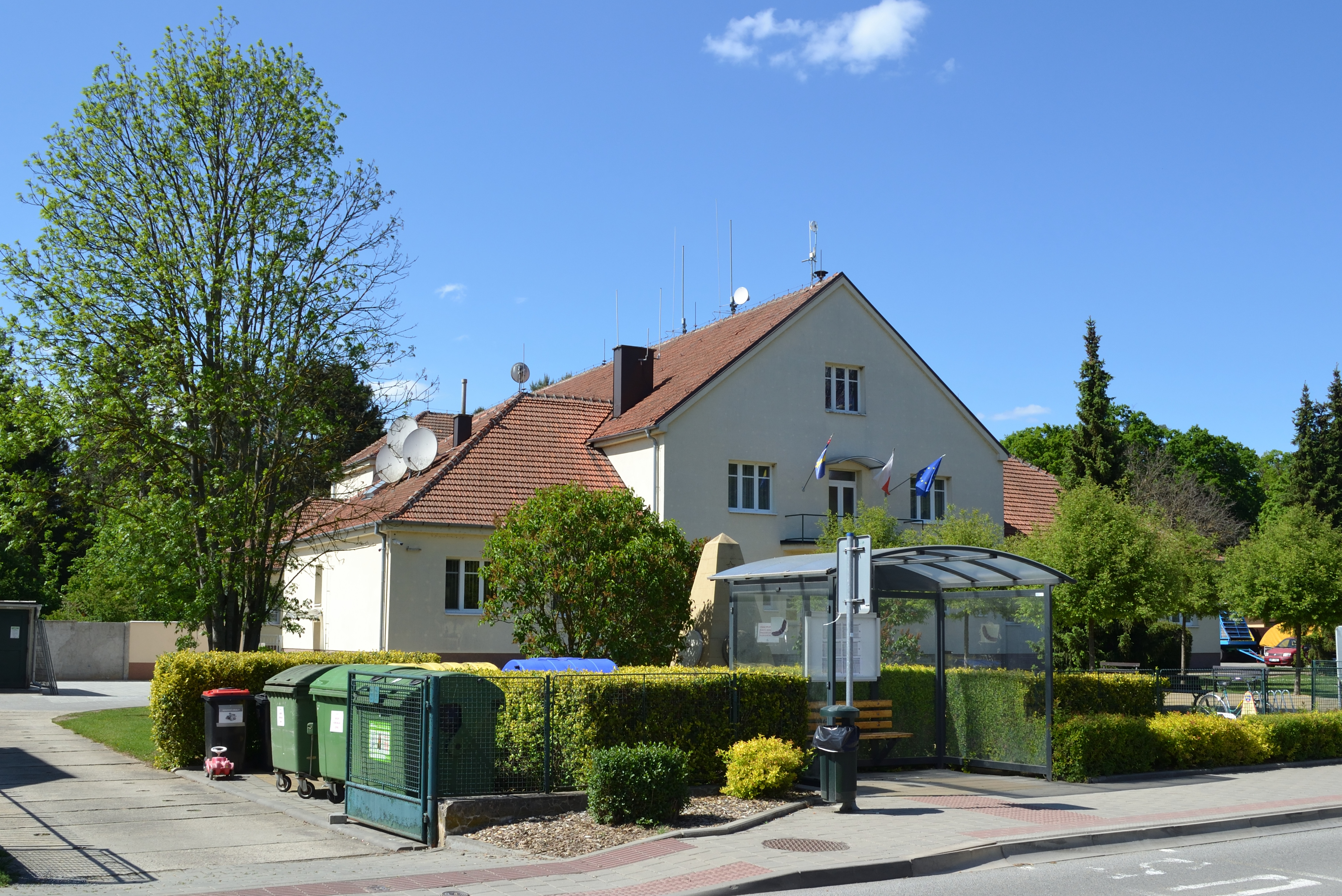
- Municipal office

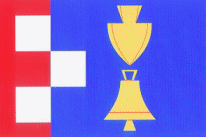
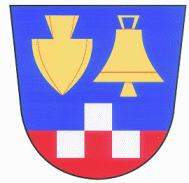
- Flag Coat of arms

- Location in the Czech Republic
- Coordinates: 49°17′19″N 16°27′31″E
- Country: Czech Republic
- Region: South Moravian
- District: Brno-Country
- First mentioned: 1235

Area
  - Total: 4.10 km^{2} (1.58 sq mi)
- Elevation: 247 m (810 ft)

Population (2026-01-01)
  - Total: 1,014
  - Density: 247/km^{2} (641/sq mi)
- Time zone: UTC+1 (CET)
  - Summer (DST): UTC+2 (CEST)
- Postal code: 664 71
- Website: www.chudcice.cz

Chudčice is a municipality and village in Brno-Country District in the South Moravian Region of the Czech Republic. It has about 1,000 inhabitants.

Chudčice lies approximately 16 kilometres (10 mi) north-west of Brno and 172 km (107 mi) south-east of Prague.

== Demographics ==
Historical population
Year	Pop.	±%
1869	427	—
1880	514	+20.4%
1890	531	+3.3%
1900	596	+12.2%
1910	737	+23.7%
1921	671	−9.0%
1930	836	+24.6%
1950	819	−2.0%
1961	842	+2.8%
1970	771	−8.4%
1980	725	−6.0%
1991	610	−15.9%
2001	657	+7.7%
2011	825	+25.6%
2021	1,008	+22.2%
Source: Censuses
