= Lažánky (Strakonice District) =

- Municipality
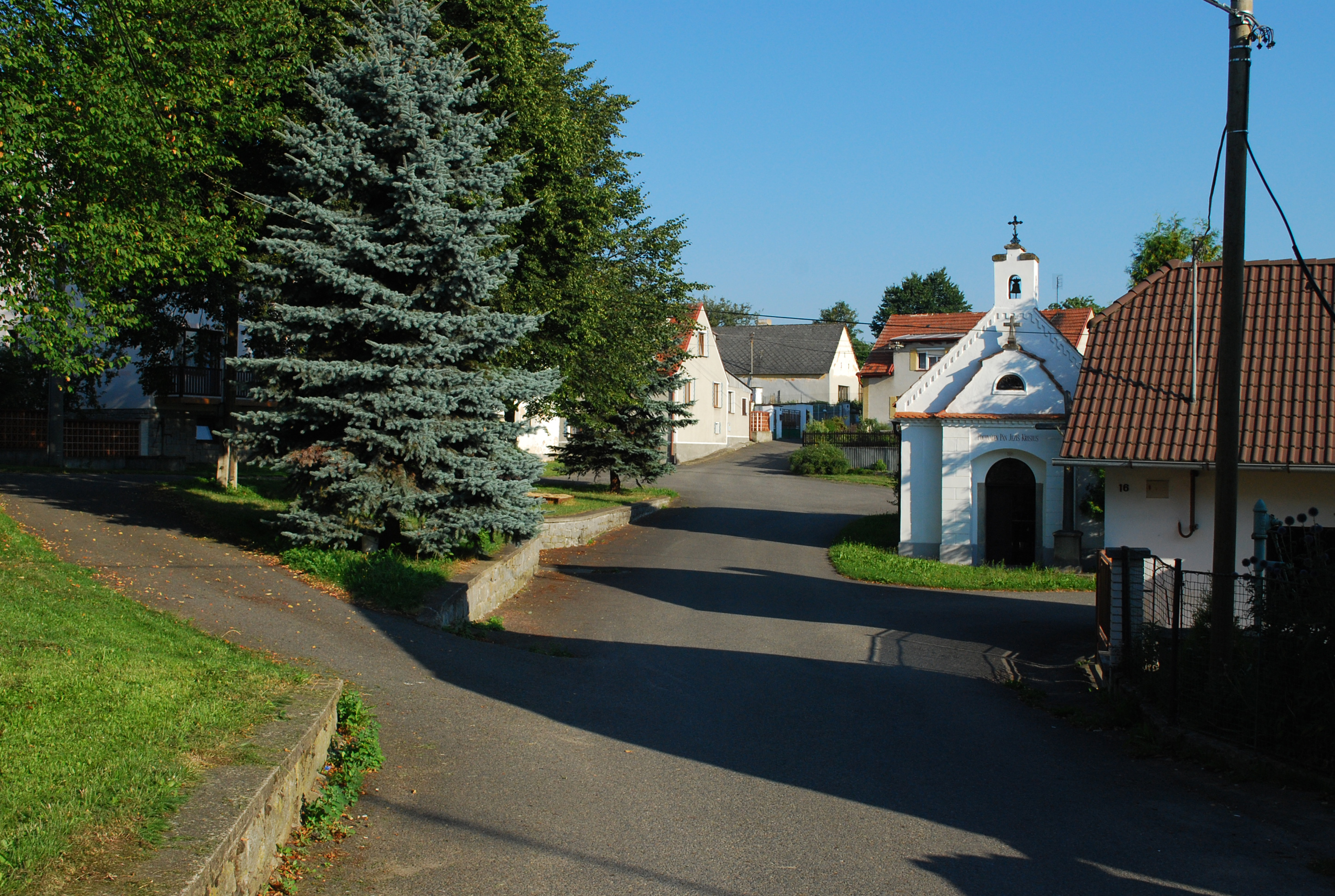
- Centre of Lažánky

- Location in the Czech Republic
- Coordinates: 49°23′29″N 13°50′12″E
- Country: Czech Republic
- Region: South Bohemian
- District: Strakonice
- First mentioned: 1328

Area
  - Total: 2.59 km^{2} (1.00 sq mi)
- Elevation: 529 m (1,736 ft)

Population (2026-01-01)
  - Total: 115
  - Density: 44.4/km^{2} (115/sq mi)
- Time zone: UTC+1 (CET)
  - Summer (DST): UTC+2 (CEST)
- Postal code: 388 01
- Website: www.obeclazanky.cz

Lažánky is a municipality and village in Strakonice District in the South Bohemian Region of the Czech Republic. It has about 100 inhabitants.

Lažánky lies approximately 16 kilometres (10 mi) north of Strakonice, 66 km (41 mi) north-west of České Budějovice, and 88 km (55 mi) south-west of Prague.

== Demographics ==
Historical population
Year	Pop.	±%
1869	180	—
1880	207	+15.0%
1890	217	+4.8%
1900	192	−11.5%
1910	200	+4.2%
1921	185	−7.5%
1930	177	−4.3%
1950	119	−32.8%
1961	115	−3.4%
1970	105	−8.7%
1980	91	−13.3%
1991	67	−26.4%
2001	70	+4.5%
2011	85	+21.4%
2021	104	+22.4%
Source: Censuses
