= Moravské Knínice =

- Municipality
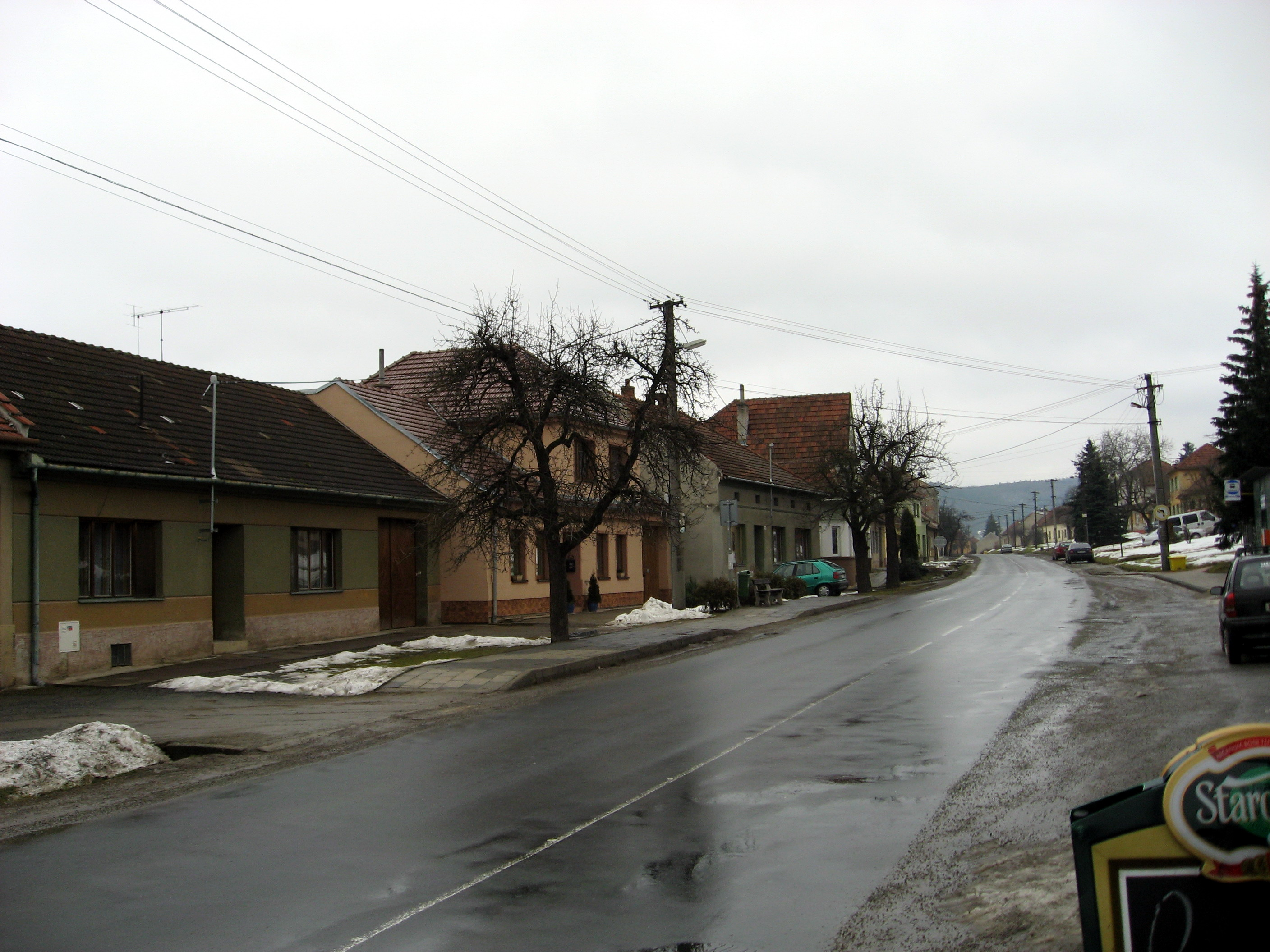
- Kuřimská street

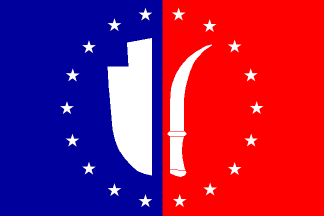
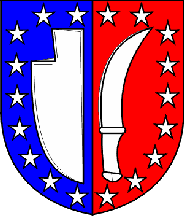
- Flag Coat of arms

- Location in the Czech Republic
- Coordinates: 49°17′36″N 16°30′6″E
- Country: Czech Republic
- Region: South Moravian
- District: Brno-Country
- First mentioned: 1235

Area
  - Total: 13.23 km^{2} (5.11 sq mi)
- Elevation: 274 m (899 ft)

Population (2026-01-01)
  - Total: 1,151
  - Density: 87.00/km^{2} (225.3/sq mi)
- Time zone: UTC+1 (CET)
  - Summer (DST): UTC+2 (CEST)
- Postal code: 664 34
- Website: www.moravskekninice.cz

Moravské Knínice is a municipality and village in Brno-Country District in the South Moravian Region of the Czech Republic. It has about 1,200 inhabitants.

Moravské Knínice lies approximately 14 kilometres (9 mi) north-west of Brno and 174 km (108 mi) south-east of Prague.

== Demographics ==
Historical population
Year	Pop.	±%
1869	708	—
1880	758	+7.1%
1890	773	+2.0%
1900	761	−1.6%
1910	857	+12.6%
1921	806	−6.0%
1930	852	+5.7%
1950	803	−5.8%
1961	866	+7.8%
1970	831	−4.0%
1980	799	−3.9%
1991	742	−7.1%
2001	763	+2.8%
2011	849	+11.3%
2021	1,095	+29.0%
Source: Censuses
