= Brno Zoo =

Zoo in Czechia

Coordinates: 49°13′48″N 16°32′00″E

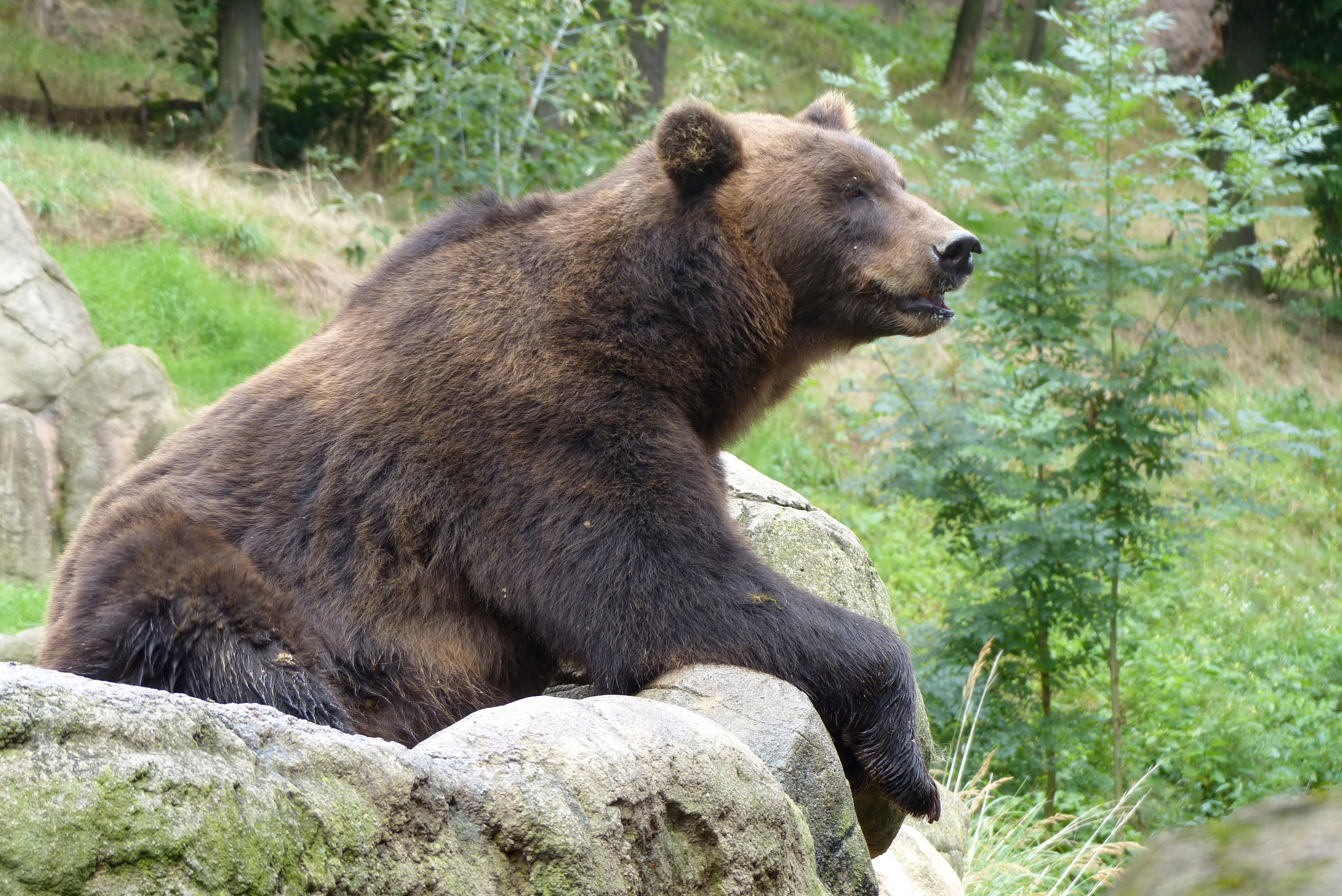
- Kamchatka brown bear
- Interactive map of Brno Zoo
- Date opened: 1953
- Location: U Zoologické zahrady 46, 635 00 Brno
- Land area: 65 hectares
- No. of animals: 2000
- No. of species: 400
- Memberships: UCSZOO, EAZA, WZO
- Website: http://www.zoobrno.cz

Brno Zoo (Czech: Zoo Brno) is a zoo located in Brno-Bystrc, a municipal district of the city of Brno, Czech Republic. It was opened in 1953.

The zoo is involved in captive breeding of endangered species coordinated by the European Endangered Species Programme like the Sumatran tiger, giant Hispaniolan Galliwasp, Przewalski's horse, as well as locally threatened species like the Czech owl called the little owl, barn owl, Eurasian beaver or the European ground squirrel. In 2000, Brno Zoo became member in World Association of Zoos and Aquariums (WZO).
