= Rozdrojovice =

- Municipality
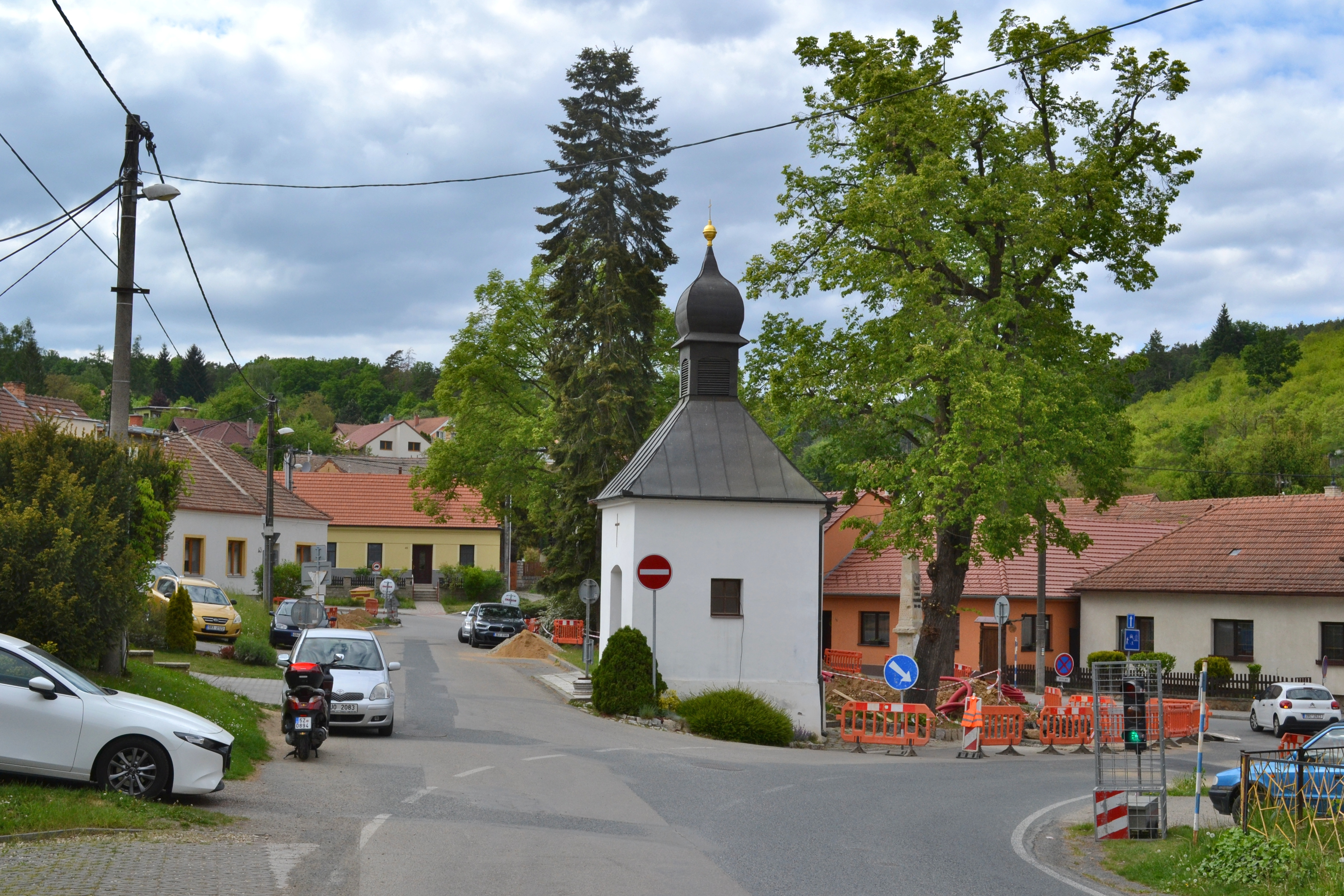
- Centre of Rozdrojovice

- Flag Coat of arms

- Location in the Czech Republic
- Coordinates: 49°15′17″N 16°30′36″E
- Country: Czech Republic
- Region: South Moravian
- District: Brno-Country
- First mentioned: 1402

Area
  - Total: 2.84 km^{2} (1.10 sq mi)
- Elevation: 304 m (997 ft)

Population (2026-01-01)
  - Total: 1,089
  - Density: 383/km^{2} (993/sq mi)
- Time zone: UTC+1 (CET)
  - Summer (DST): UTC+2 (CEST)
- Postal code: 664 34
- Website: www.rozdrojovice.cz

Rozdrojovice is a municipality and village in Brno-Country District in the South Moravian Region of the Czech Republic. It has about 1,100 inhabitants.

Rozdrojovice lies approximately 10 kilometres (6 mi) north-west of Brno and 177 km (110 mi) south-east of Prague.

== Demographics ==
Historical population
Year	Pop.	±%
1869	345	—
1880	375	+8.7%
1890	444	+18.4%
1900	494	+11.3%
1910	526	+6.5%
1921	490	−6.8%
1930	548	+11.8%
1950	526	−4.0%
1961	584	+11.0%
1970	550	−5.8%
1980	537	−2.4%
1991	466	−13.2%
2001	570	+22.3%
2011	926	+62.5%
2021	1,087	+17.4%
Source: Censuses
