= Veverská Bítýška =

- Town
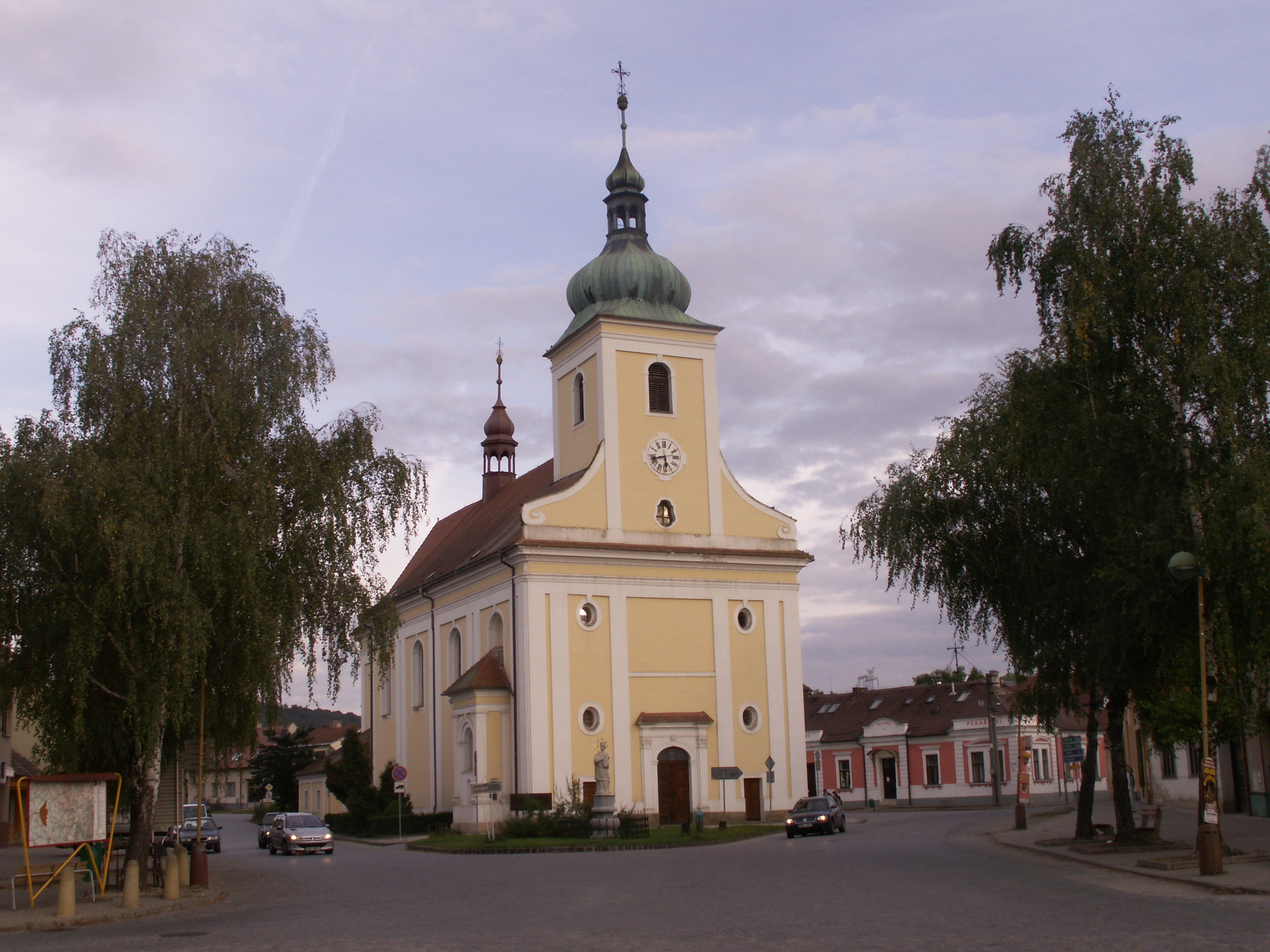
- Town square with the Church of Saint James the Great

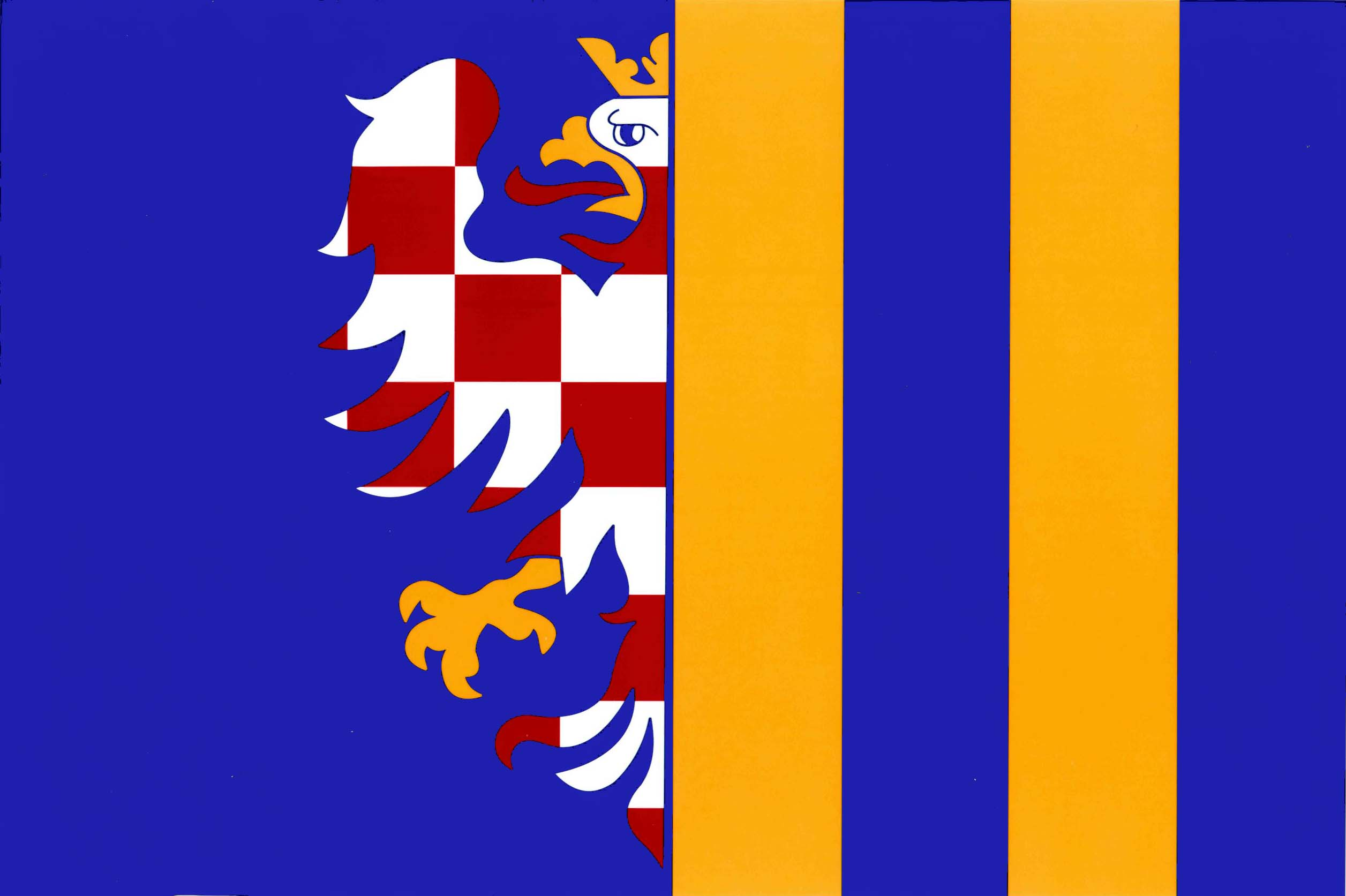
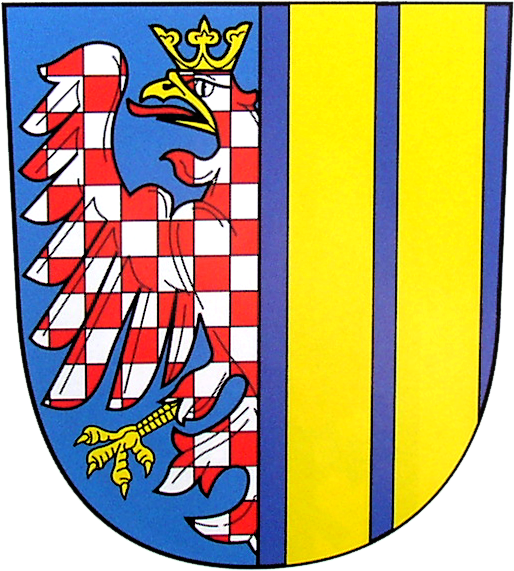
- Flag Coat of arms

- Location in the Czech Republic
- Coordinates: 49°16′33″N 16°26′13″E
- Country: Czech Republic
- Region: South Moravian
- District: Brno-Country
- First mentioned: 1376

Government
  - Mayor: Lukáš Zavadil

Area
  - Total: 13.60 km^{2} (5.25 sq mi)
- Elevation: 235 m (771 ft)

Population (2026-01-01)
  - Total: 3,521
  - Density: 258.9/km^{2} (670.5/sq mi)
- Time zone: UTC+1 (CET)
  - Summer (DST): UTC+2 (CEST)
- Postal code: 664 71
- Website: www.obecveverskabityska.cz

Veverská Bítýška (Czech pronunciation: [ˈvɛvɛrskaː ˈbiːtiːʃka]) is a town in Brno-Country District in the South Moravian Region of the Czech Republic. It has about 3,500 inhabitants. The town is located on the Svratka River.

== Etymology ==
The name Bítýška is a diminutive of Bíteš (compared with the nearby Velká Bíteš). It is derived from the personal Old Czech name Bítech, Bietech or Bytech. The prefix Veverská ("Veveří's") refers to the Veveří Castle.

== Geography ==
Veverská Bítýška is located about 13 kilometres (8 mi) northwest of Brno. It lies mostly in the Boskovice Furrow. The western part of the municipal territory lies in the Křižanov Highlands and includes the highest point of Veverská Bítýška, a hill with an altitude of 437 m (1,434 ft). The town lies on the Svratka River, at its confluence with the stream Bílý potok.

== History ==
The first written mention of Veverská Bítýška is from 1376. It was part of the Veveří estate. In 1521, it was promoted to a market town.

Veverská Bítýška was promoted to a town in 2018.

== Demographics ==
Historical population

Year	Pop.	±%
1869	1,660	—
1880	1,701	+2.5%
1890	1,477	−13.2%
1900	1,477	+0.0%
1910	1,840	+24.6%

Year	Pop.	±%
1921	1,905	+3.5%
1930	1,944	+2.0%
1950	2,130	+9.6%
1961	2,301	+8.0%
1970	2,366	+2.8%

Year	Pop.	±%
1980	2,755	+16.4%
1991	2,758	+0.1%
2001	2,790	+1.2%
2011	3,085	+10.6%
2021	3,363	+9.0%

Source: Censuses

== Transport ==
There are no railways or major roads passing through the municipality.

== Sights ==
The main landmark of Veverská Bítýška is the Church of Saint James the Great. It was built in the late Baroque style in 1771–1782.

The Jaroš's watermill is located on the Bílý potok. It is a valuable technical monument dating from 1938 with a set of technological equipment. Today it houses the Museum of Mill Craft.

== Notable people ==
- Marie Kudeříková (1921–1943), resistance fighter; lived here
