= Lažánky (Brno-Country District) =

- Municipality
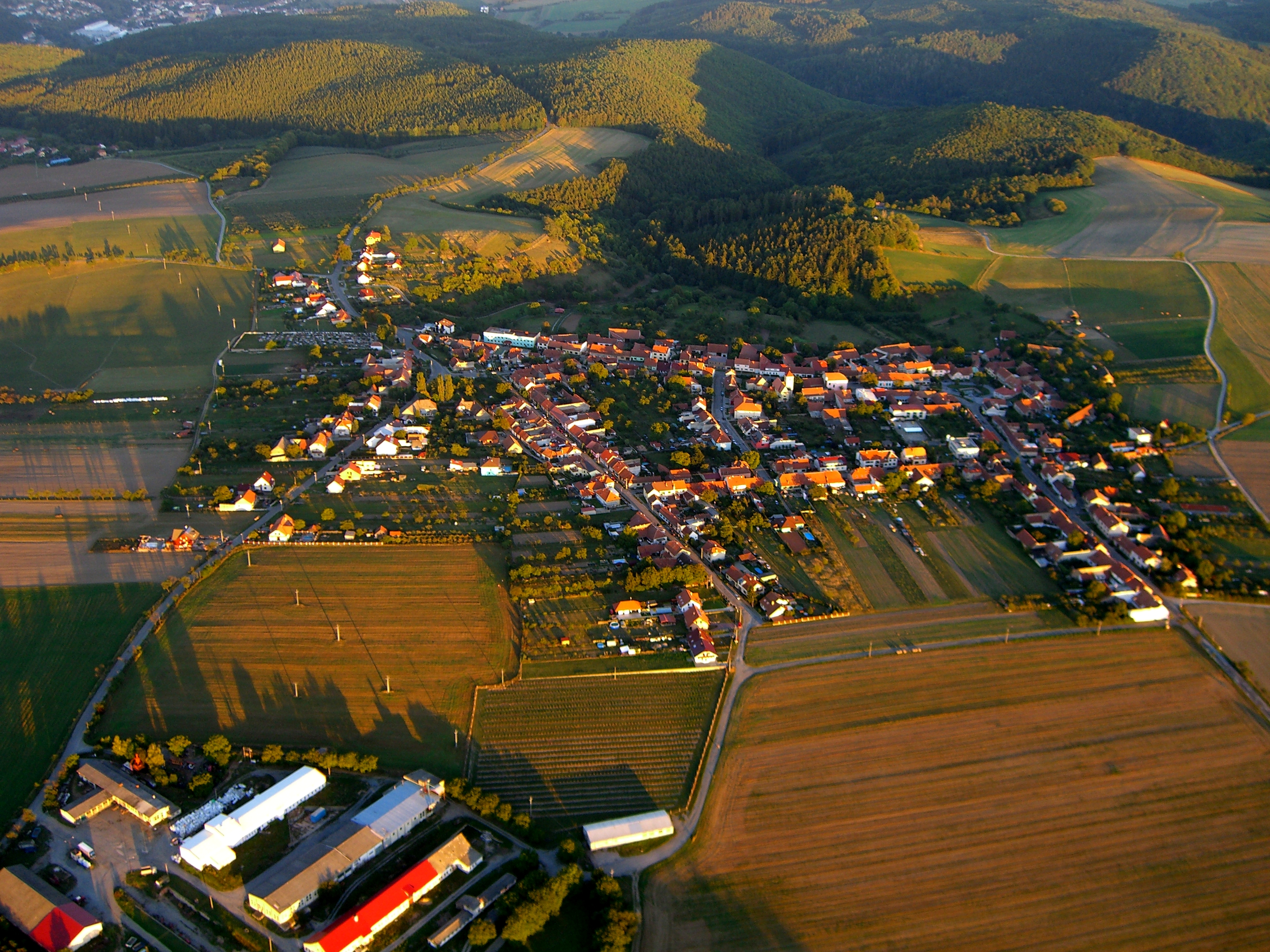
- Aerial view

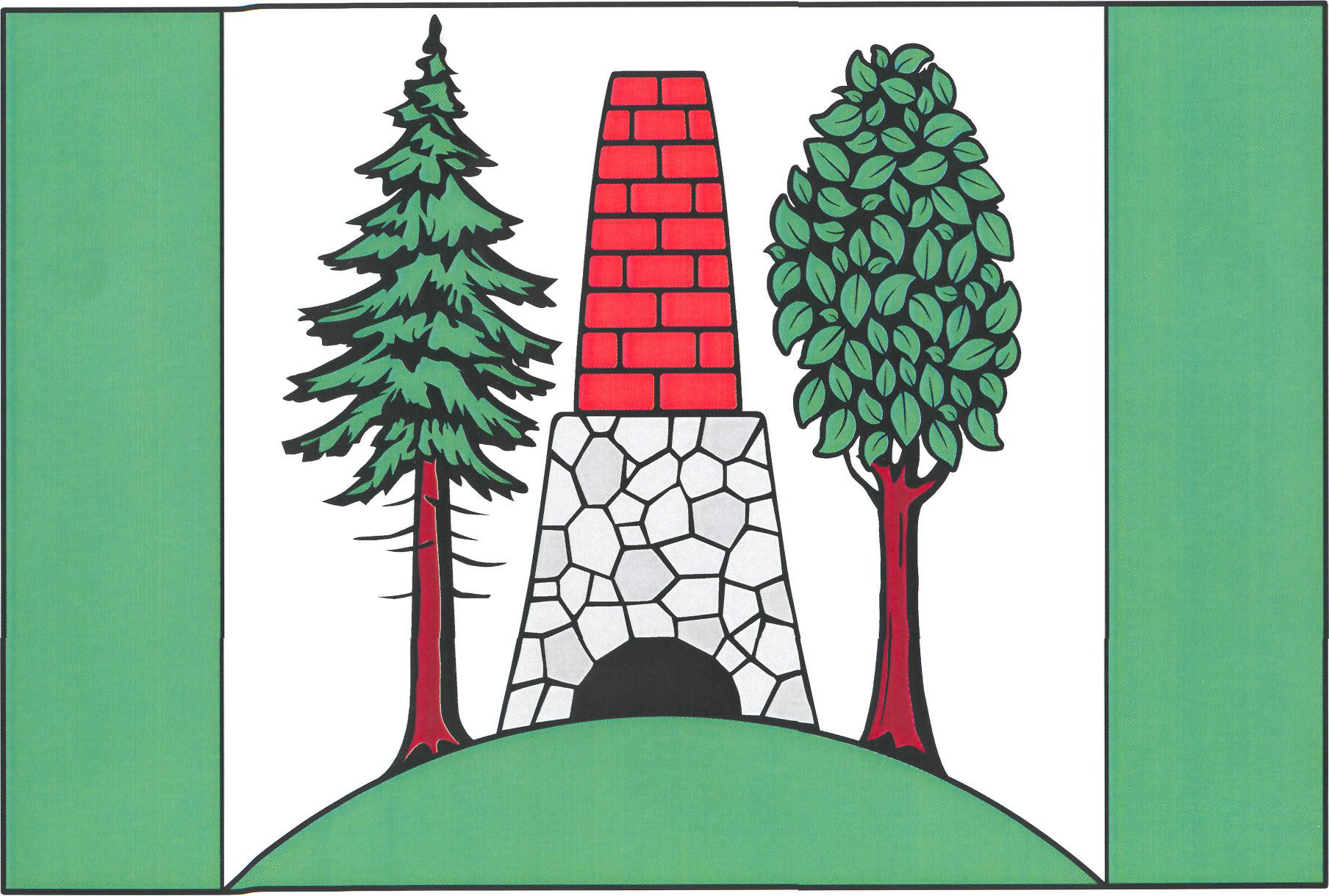
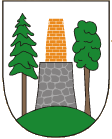
- Flag Coat of arms

- Location in the Czech Republic
- Coordinates: 49°16′44″N 16°23′17″E
- Country: Czech Republic
- Region: South Moravian
- District: Brno-Country
- First mentioned: 1236

Area
  - Total: 13.93 km^{2} (5.38 sq mi)
- Elevation: 442 m (1,450 ft)

Population (2026-01-01)
  - Total: 805
  - Density: 57.8/km^{2} (150/sq mi)
- Time zone: UTC+1 (CET)
  - Summer (DST): UTC+2 (CEST)
- Postal code: 664 71
- Website: www.lazanky.cz

Lažánky is a municipality and village in Brno-Country District in the South Moravian Region of the Czech Republic. It has about 800 inhabitants.

Lažánky lies approximately 19 kilometres (12 mi) north-west of Brno and 168 km (104 mi) south-east of Prague.

== Administrative division ==
Lažánky consists of two municipal parts (in brackets population according to the 2021 census):

- Lažánky (659)
- Holasice (52)

== History ==
The first written mention of Lažánky is from 1236.

== Demographics ==
Historical population
Year	Pop.	±%
1869	729	—
1880	853	+17.0%
1890	849	−0.5%
1900	866	+2.0%
1910	916	+5.8%
1921	916	+0.0%
1930	833	−9.1%
1950	793	−4.8%
1961	813	+2.5%
1970	741	−8.9%
1980	686	−7.4%
1991	621	−9.5%
2001	634	+2.1%
2011	697	+9.9%
2021	711	+2.0%
Source: Censuses
