= Všechovice =

Všechovice may refer to places in the Czech Republic:

- Všechovice (Brno-Country District), a municipality and village in the South Moravian Region
- Všechovice (Přerov District), a municipality and village in the Olomouc Region
