= Palace Moravia =

Coordinates: 49°11′42.74″N 16°36′50.31″E

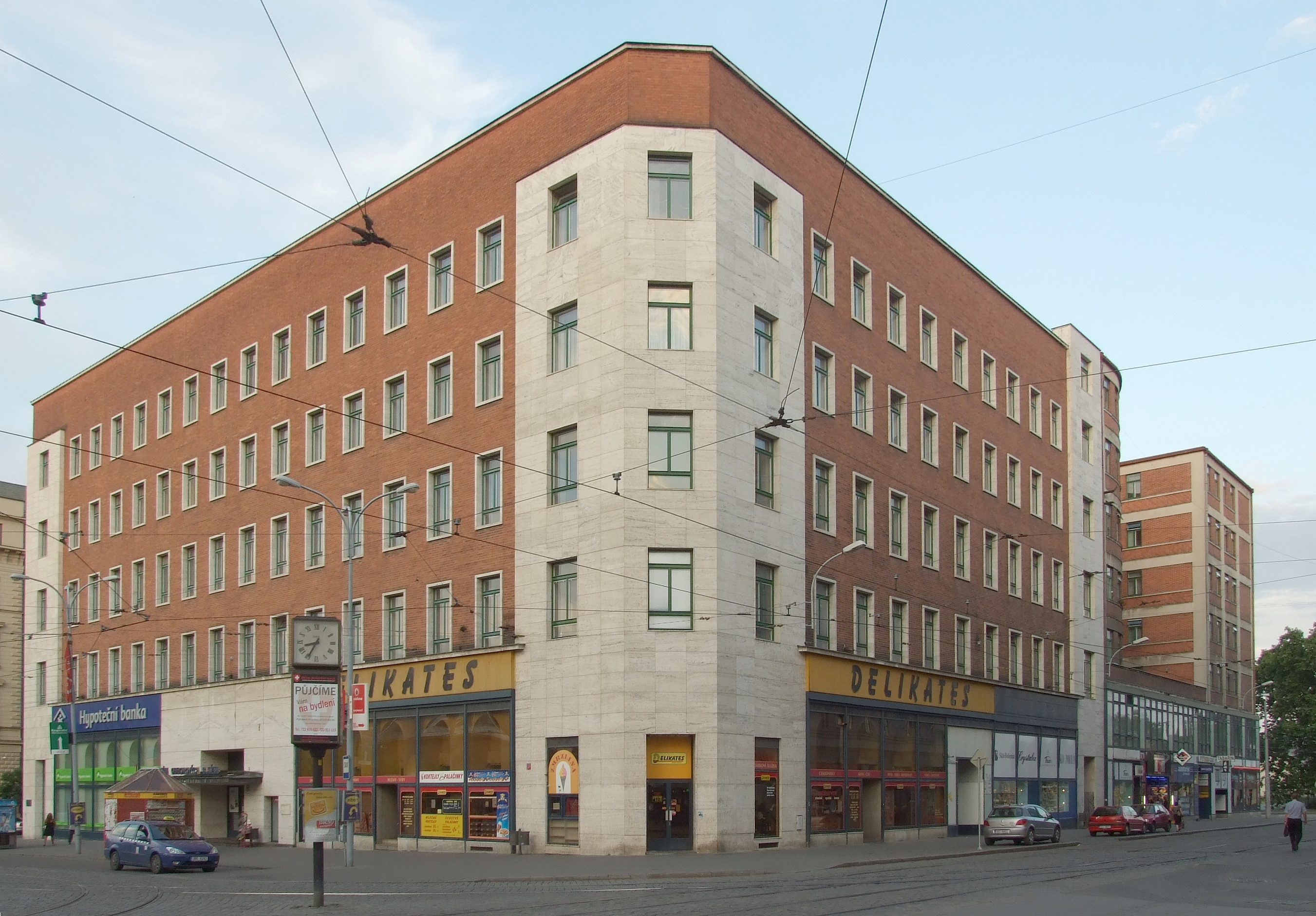
Palác Morava from northwest.

Palace Moravia (Palác Morava in Czech, Morava-Palast in German) is a building in City of Brno, Czech Republic.

In 1926, an architectural competition for the model of a hotel was announced. This was supposed to be built on a place of former music-hall building. World-known architects, including Peter Behrens and Jacobus Oud participated in this contest, alongside home-born architects. Eventually, this place was built over by Arnošt Wiesner by a slightly different complex of buildings. He had to face up to not only a ground plan difficult parcel but also geologically poor sub-soil. During the design, he also worked with structural engineer Jaroslav Valenta.

In the bottom part of the building, there was a commercial zone, a basement cinema, and a bar. A coffee lounge is situated on the first floor with a large terrace attached to it. Thanks to the genial natural lightning in the top area of the building, Wiesner dedicated this part to residential apartments. A contrast of reinforced concrete and raw brickwork is also very interesting. Later, Wiesner linked the building of Moravská zemská životní pojišťovna (Moravian Life Insurance Company) to the whole construction. The project was finally completed in 1936.

== See also ==
- Palác Morava is also named for the planned business centrum building in Olomouc, Moravia.
