= Bohuslav Fuchs =

Czech modernist architect (1895–1972)

Prof. Ing. arch. Bohuslav Fuchs DrSc.
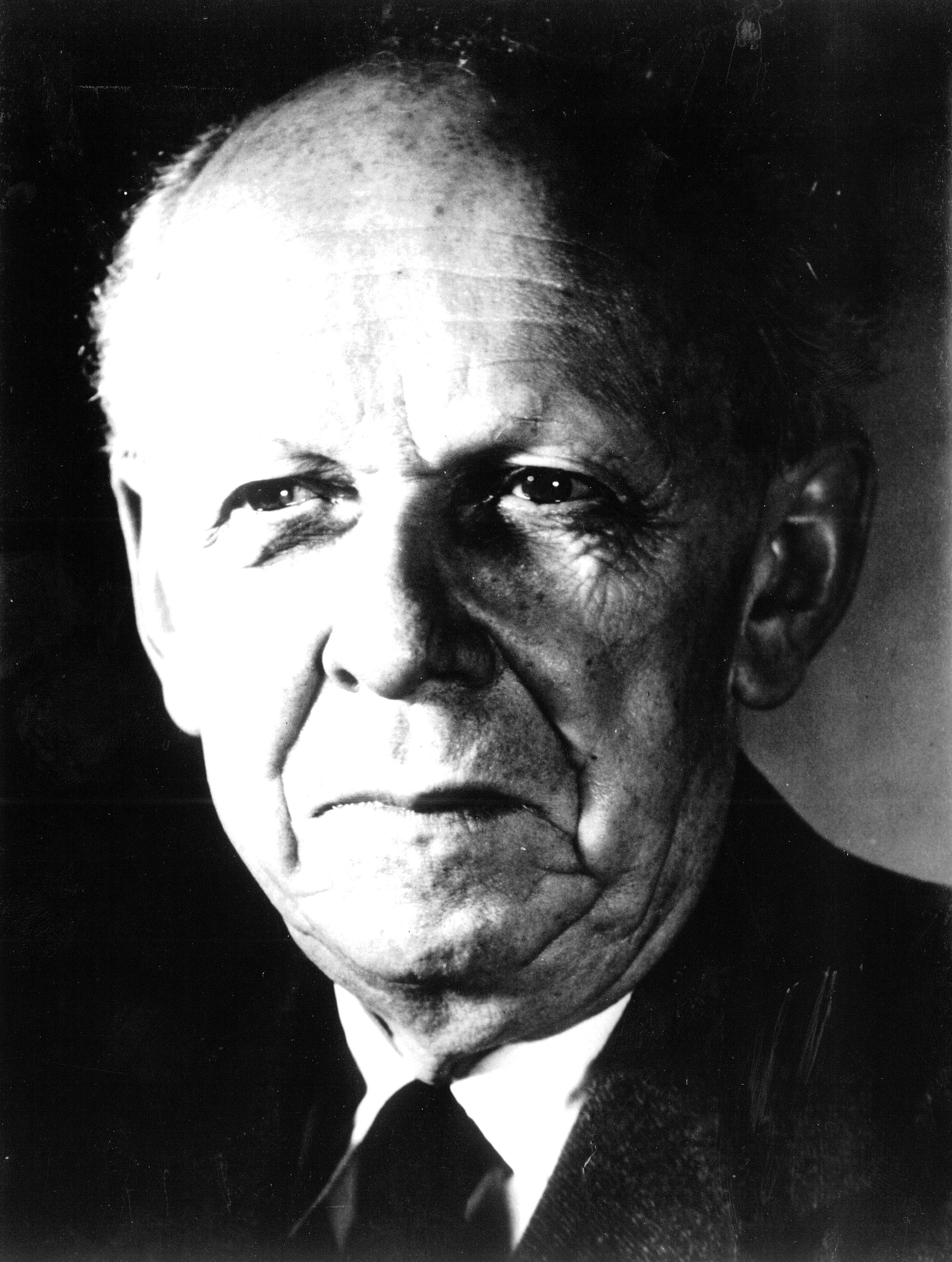
- Born: 24 March 1895; Všechovice, Moravia, Austria-Hungary
- Died: 18 September 1972 (aged 77); Brno, Czechoslovakia

Bohuslav Fuchs (24 March 1895 – 18 September 1972) was a Czech modernist architect. He also worked as a university teacher and urban planner. He is considered one of the most important Czech architects of the 20th century. His work is primarily associated with the city of Brno.

== Life and career ==
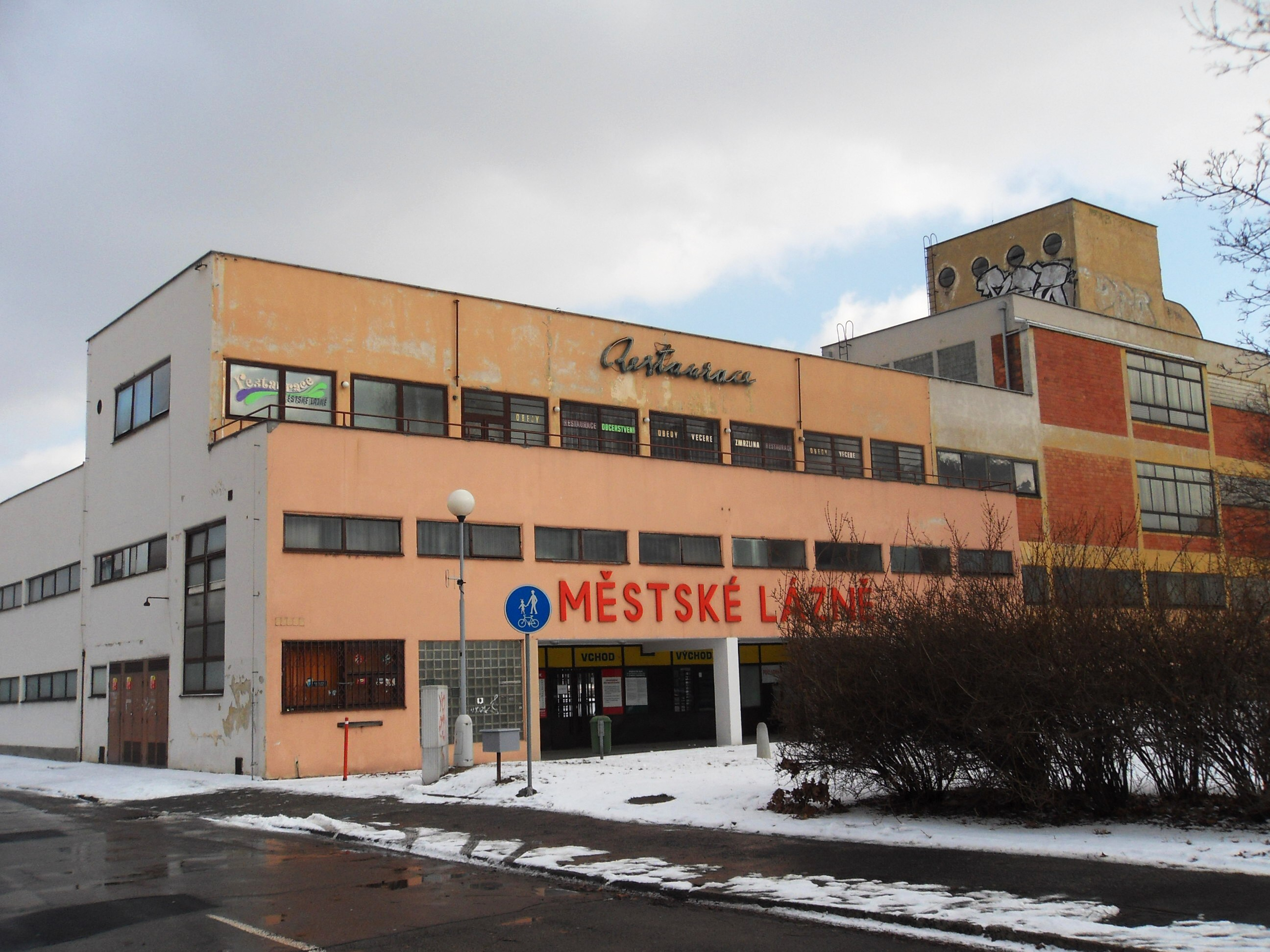
Municipal Spa in Zábrdovice (1930)

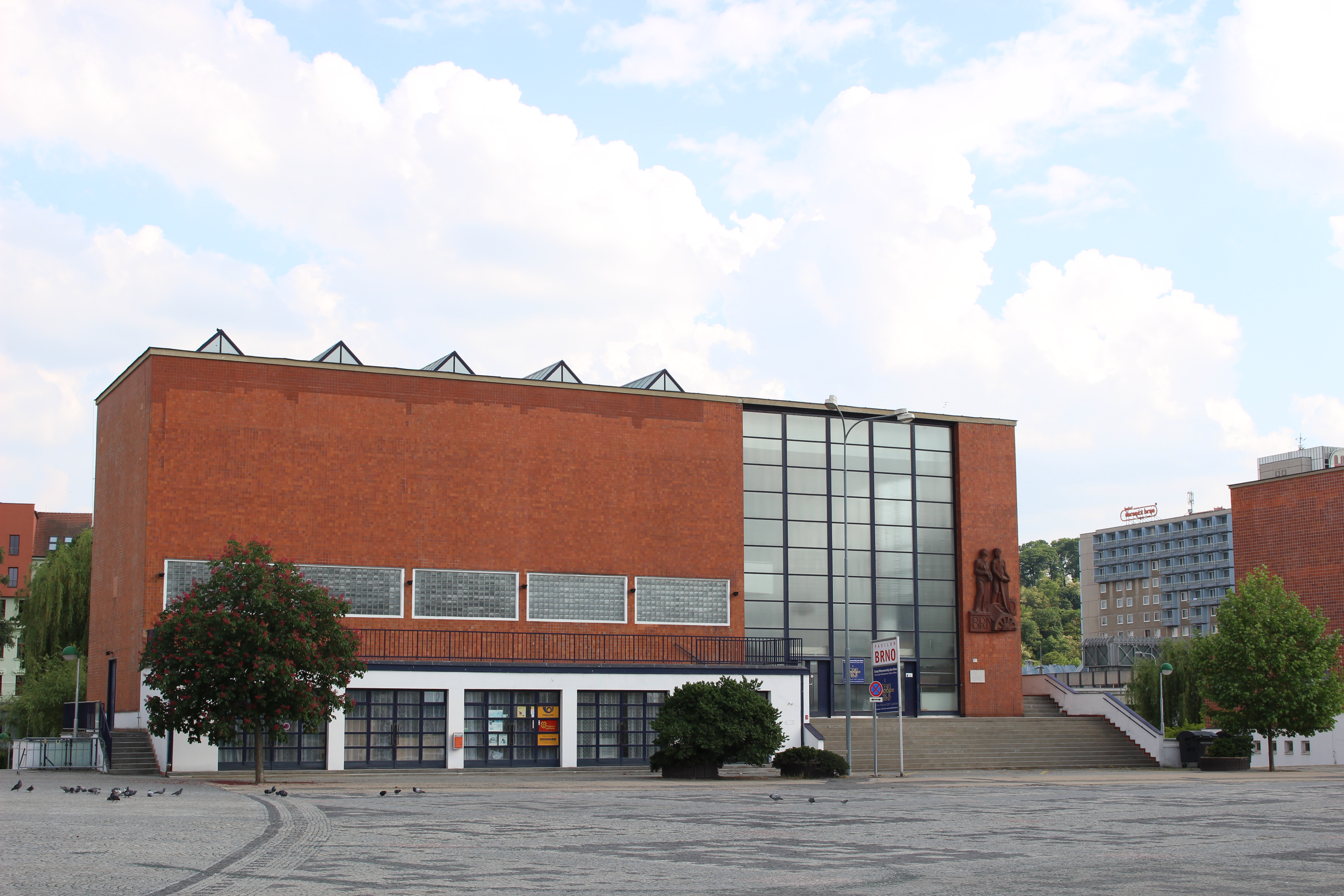
Pavillon Brno at the Brno Exhibition Grounds (1928)

Bohuslav Fuchs was born on 24 March 1895 in Všechovice. He attended a school in Holešov and the civil engineering technical school in Brno. After school, he went to Prague to work as a bricklayer, but was soon accepted into the Academy of Fine Arts in Prague, where he studied with Jan Kotěra between 1916 and 1919. In 1919–1921, he worked in Kotěra's atelier. In 1922, Fuchs moved back to Brno, where he married Drahomíra Střelcová in 1923. They had two children, a daughter and a son.

In Brno, Fuchs worked at the city construction office in 1923–1929, and from 1929 in his own atelier.

Between 1947 and 1958, Fuchs was a professor of architecture at Brno University of Technology. He participated in several professional associations abroad (e. g. British RIBA). His projects, realized mainly in Brno, were predominantly influenced by functionalism.

He died on 18 September 1972 in Brno. He was buried at the Brno Central Cemetery.

== Selected works ==
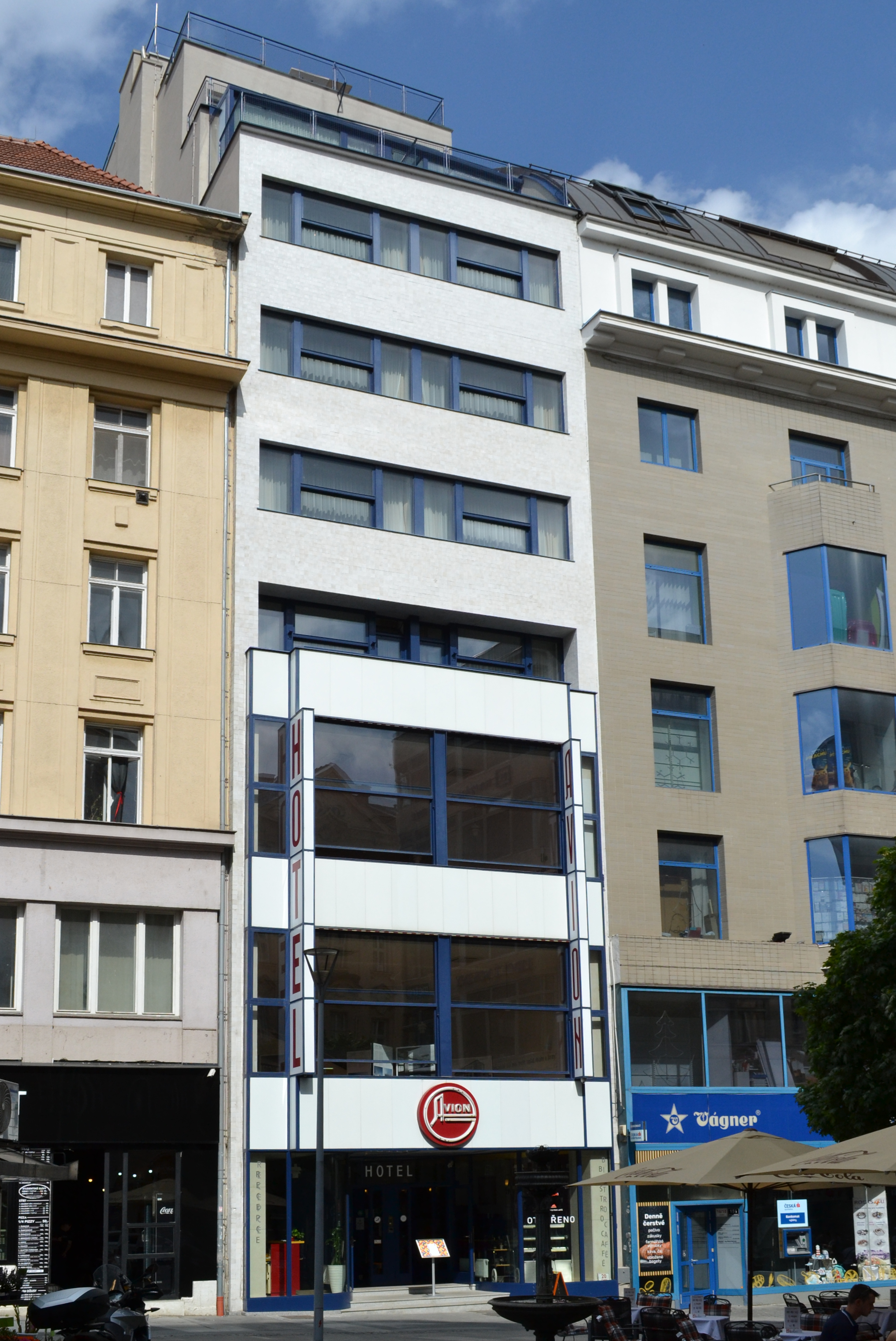
Hotel Avion (1927)

Fuchs is considered one of the most important Czech architects of the 20th century, who achieved European renown. In his work, he believed in the principle that architecture must serve people. Most of his notable buildings are located in Brno, including:

- Zemanova kavárna (Café Zeman), 1925
- Masná burza (Meat Exchange House), 1926
- Hotel Avion, 1927
- Pavillons at the Brno Exhibition Ground, 1928
- Fuchs Villa, 1929
- Moravská banka, 1930, together with Arnošt Wiesner
- Vesna Professional Secondary School for Woman's Occupation, 1930, together with Josef Polášek
- Municipal Spa in Zábrdovice, 1930
- Petrák Villa, 1936
- Tesař Villa, 1938
- Post office, 1938
- Brno House of Arts – reconstruction, 1947
- Bus station in Benešova Street, 1949
- Red Army monument, 1955, together with Vincenc Makovský and Antonín Kurial

Fuchs' notable work outside Brno includes:

- Klostermann Hut in Modrava, 1922
- Masaryk Hut, Šerlich mountain, Deštné v Orlických horách, 1925
- Central and residential building of the Středomoravské elektrárny energy company in Přerov, 1929
- Municipal Savings Bank in Třebíč, 1931
- Municipal Savings Bank in Tišnov, 1933
- Thermal swimming pool Zelená žába in Trenčianske Teplice, 1936
- Moravian Slovakia Museum in Uherské Hradiště, 1942
- New Scene of the National Theatre in Prague, 1966

Most of his works are protected as cultural monuments of the Czech Republic.

== Honours and legacy ==
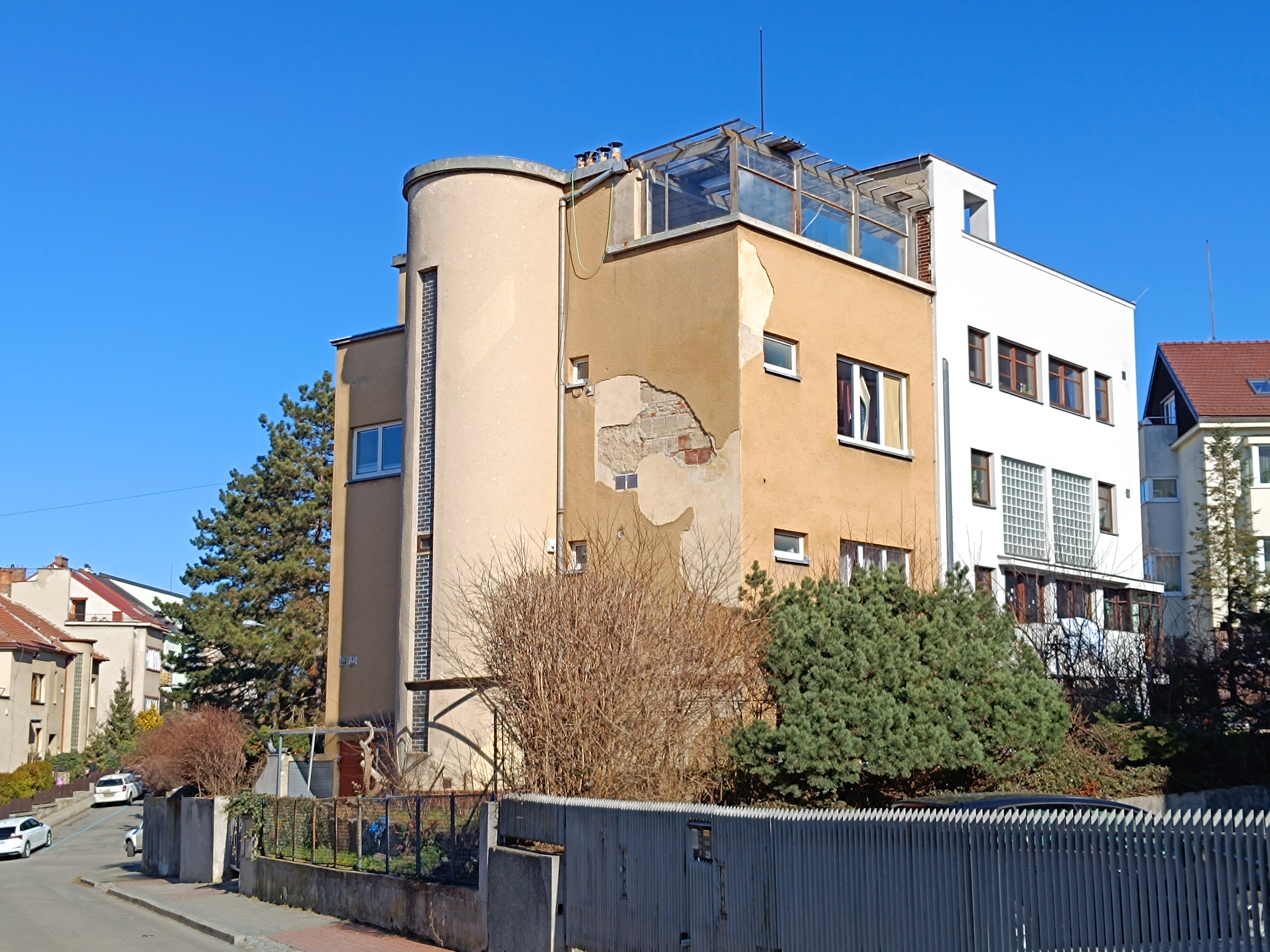
Fuchs Villa, which Fuchs built for himself (1929)

In 1969, Fusch became a laureate of Herder Prize.

Hotel Avion in Brno, which is one of Fuchs' works, houses a museum of functionalism and life and work of Bohuslav Fuchs.

A street in Brno is named after Fuchs.

The monument to B. Fuchs was unveiled in 1995 in the Pisárky district of Brno.

In 2025, to celebrate the 130th anniversary of Bohuslav Fuchs' birth, a life-size inflatable bust of Fuchs was created. The projects aim was to commemorate his legacy and influence on the modern look of Brno.

== Gallery ==
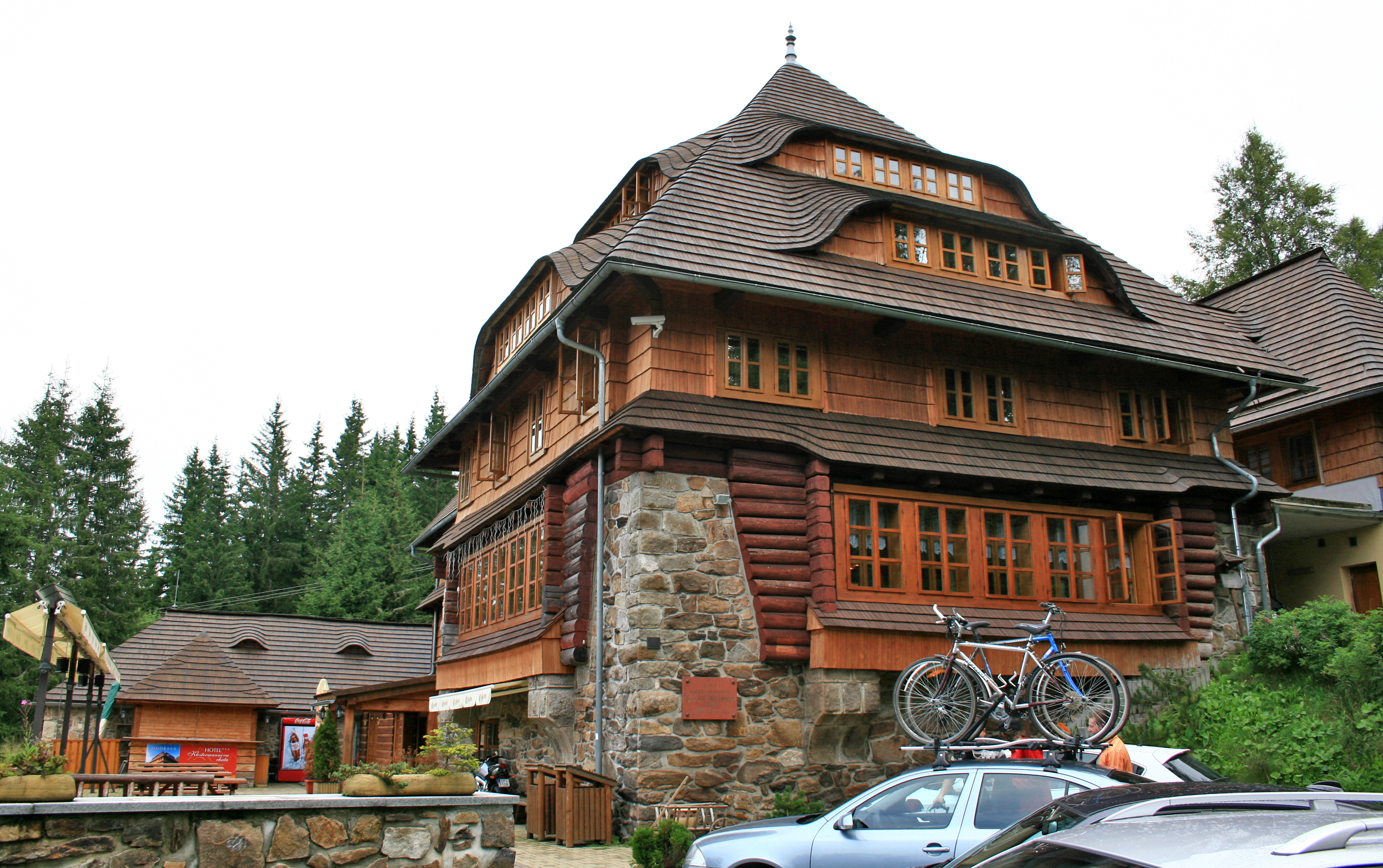
Klostermann Hut (1922)

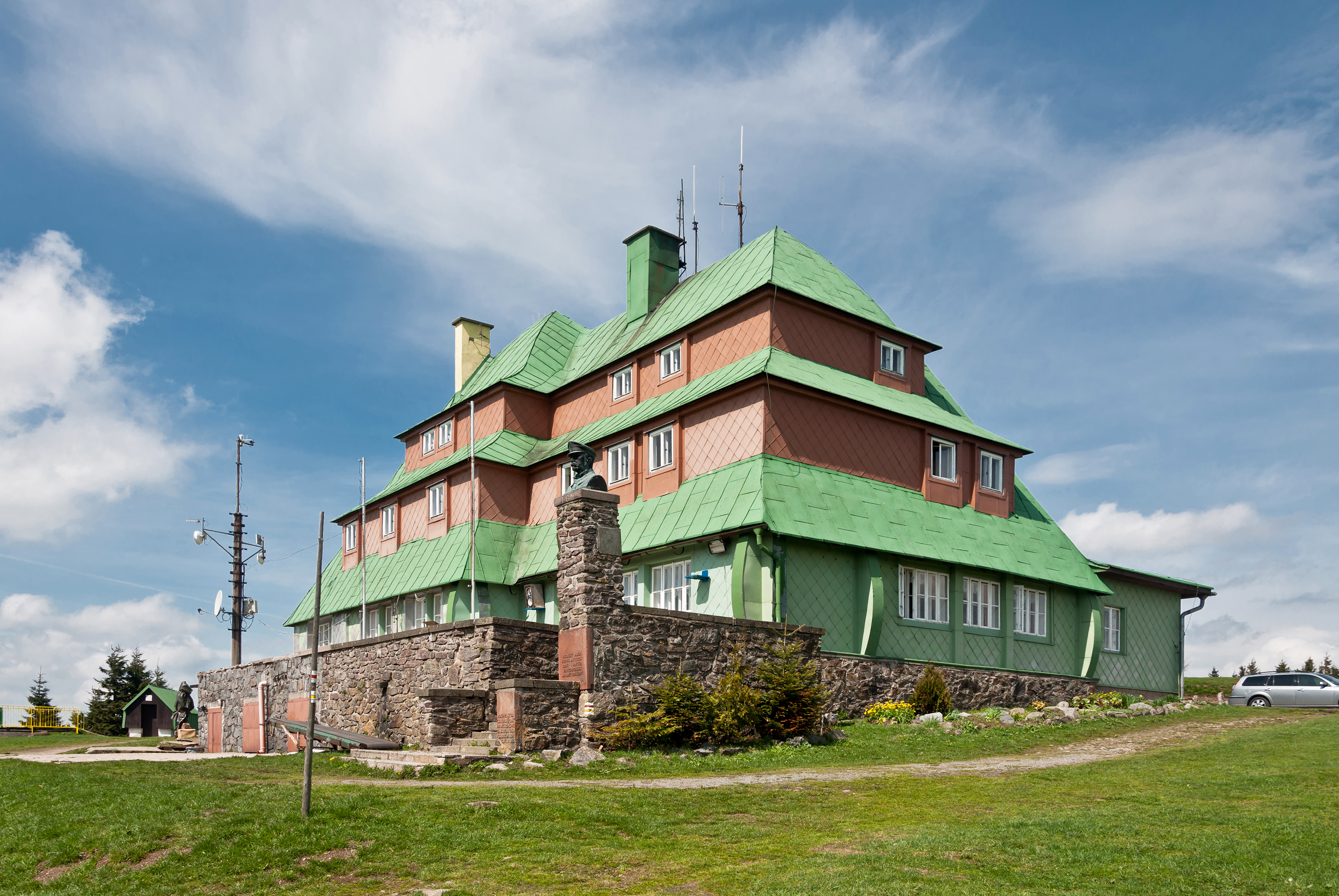
Masaryk Hut (1925)

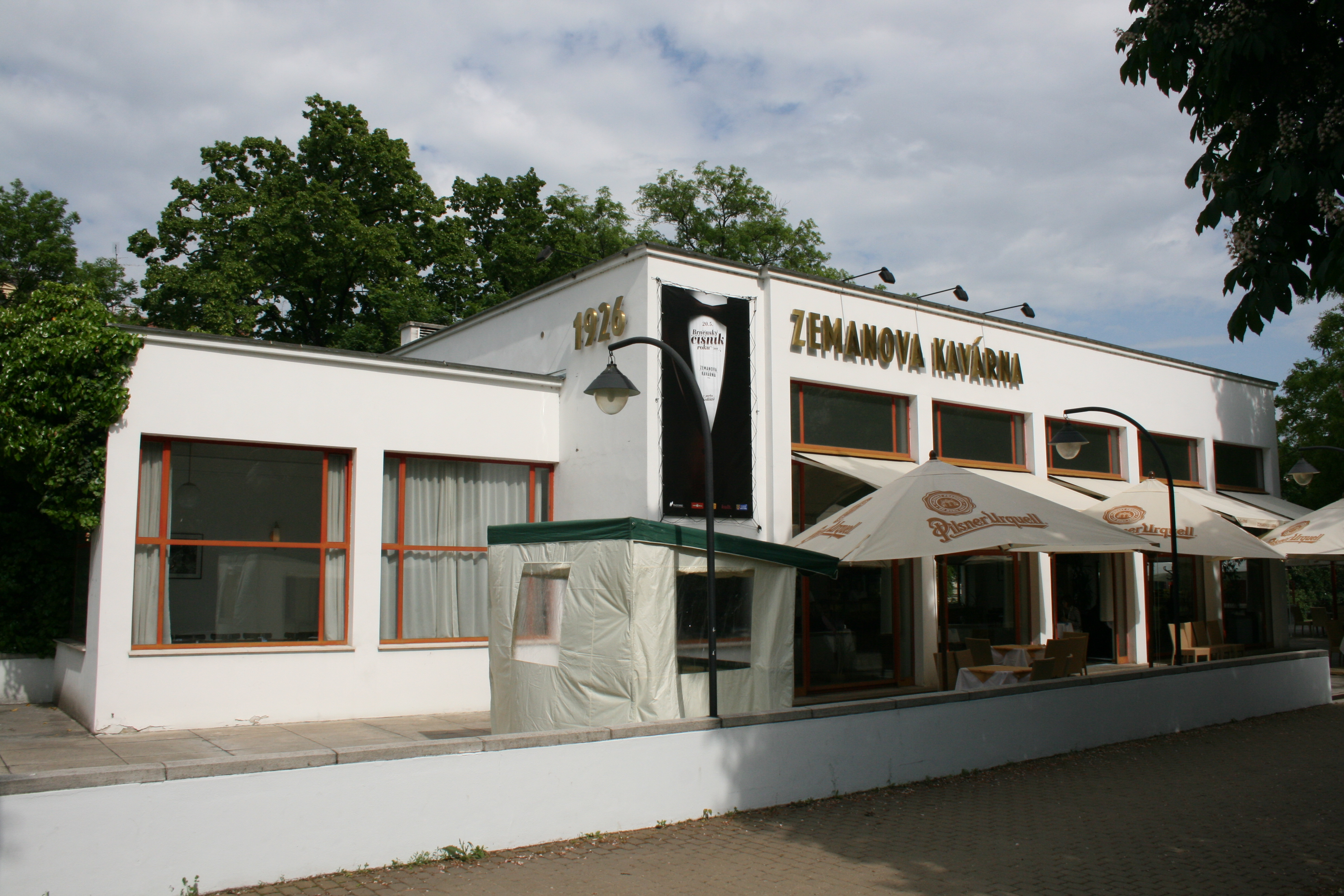
Zemanova kavárna (1925)

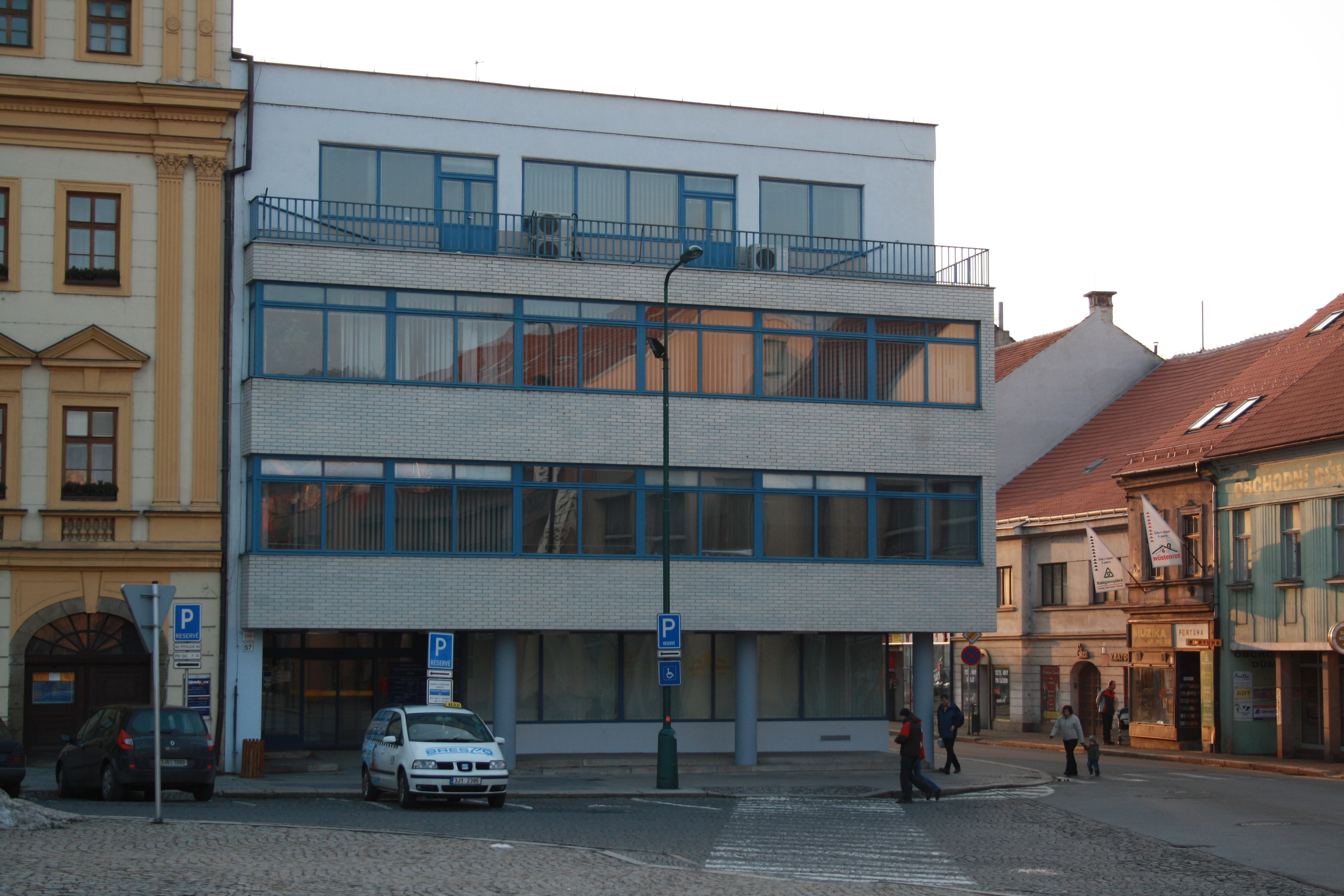
Municipal Savings Bank in Třebíč (1931)

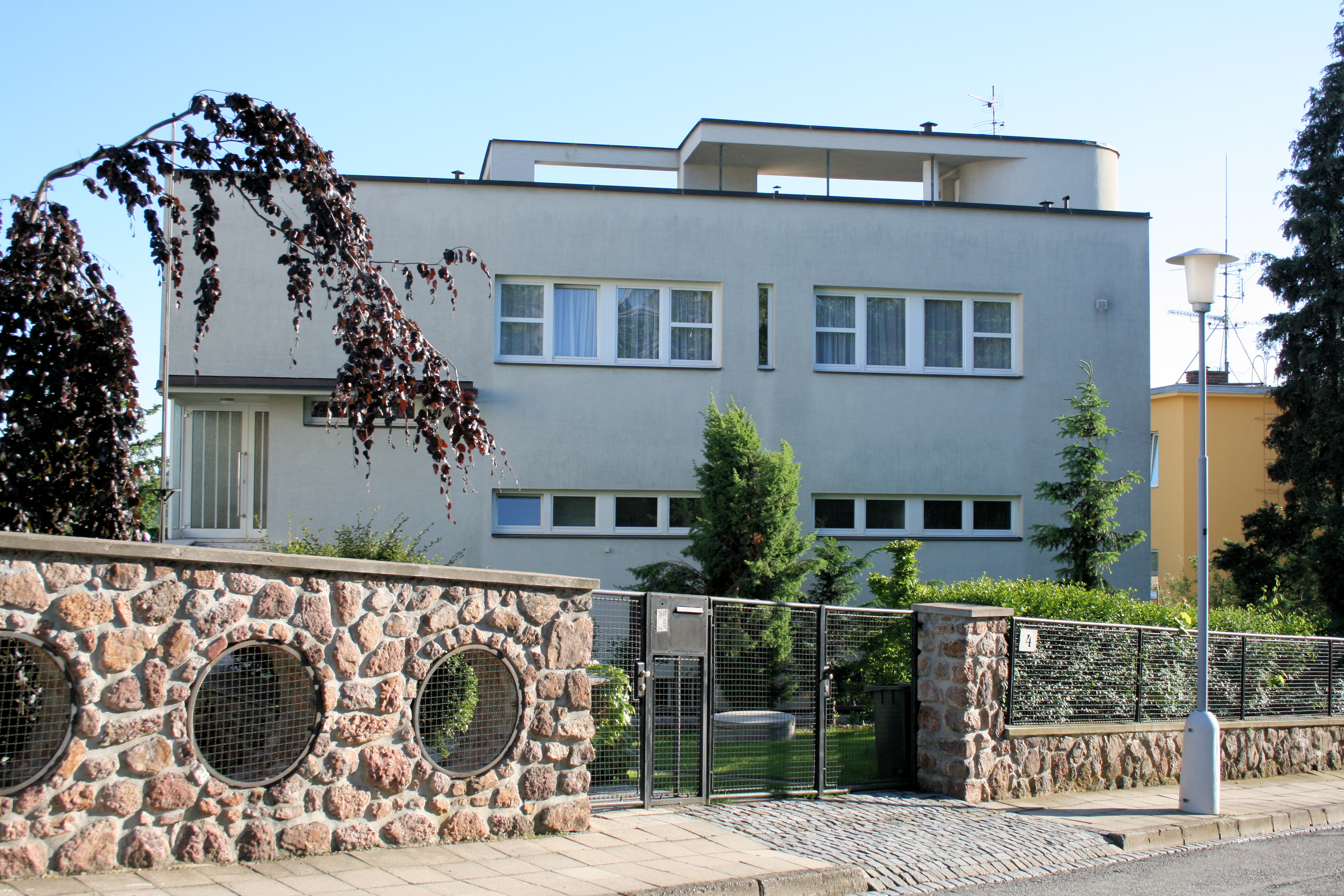
Petrák Villa (1936)
