= Ernst Wiesner =

Austrian modernist architect

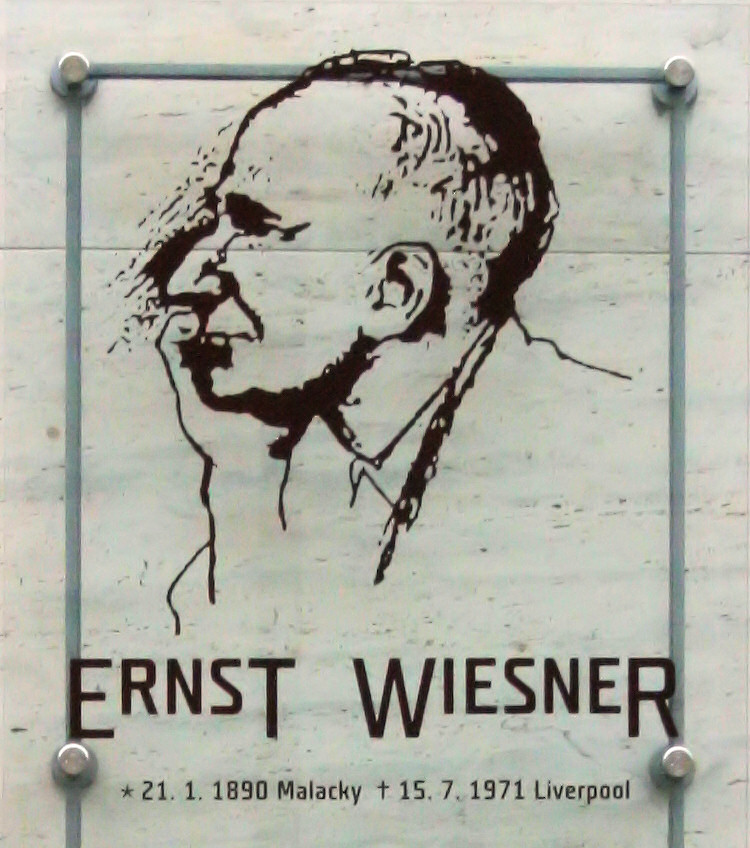
Memorial plaque to Ernst Wiesner in Brno

Ernst Wiesner, also known as Arnošt Wiesner (21 January 1890, in Malacky, Kingdom of Hungary, Austro-Hungarian Empire – 15 July 1971, in Liverpool) was a modernist architect, one of the foremost interwar period architects of Brno. His ancestors with German surnames Wiesner came from the area of modern Austria.

From 1908 to 1913 Wiesner studied at the Technical University of Vienna and Academy of Fine Arts Vienna (taught by Friedrich Ohmann) in Vienna. After World War I he worked as an independent architect in the city of Brno, until 1939. Wiesner was a very active architect in the city between the World Wars. His work was greatly influenced by Adolf Loos and his pure constructions with their classicized balance and monumentality are amongst the best works constructed in Brno at that time.

With the Third Reich's increasing grip on Czechoslovakia, Wiesner emigrated to Great Britain where he lived for the remainder of his life, and joined the foreign anti-fascist resistance during World War II. During 1948-1950 he acted as a lecturer in the School of Architecture at the University of Oxford and during 1950–1960 at the University of Liverpool. In 1969 he was nominated to the rank of honorary doctor by the University of Jan Evangelista Purkyně (now Masaryk University) in Brno. When he died in 1971 he was buried in Liverpool's Allerton Cemetery.

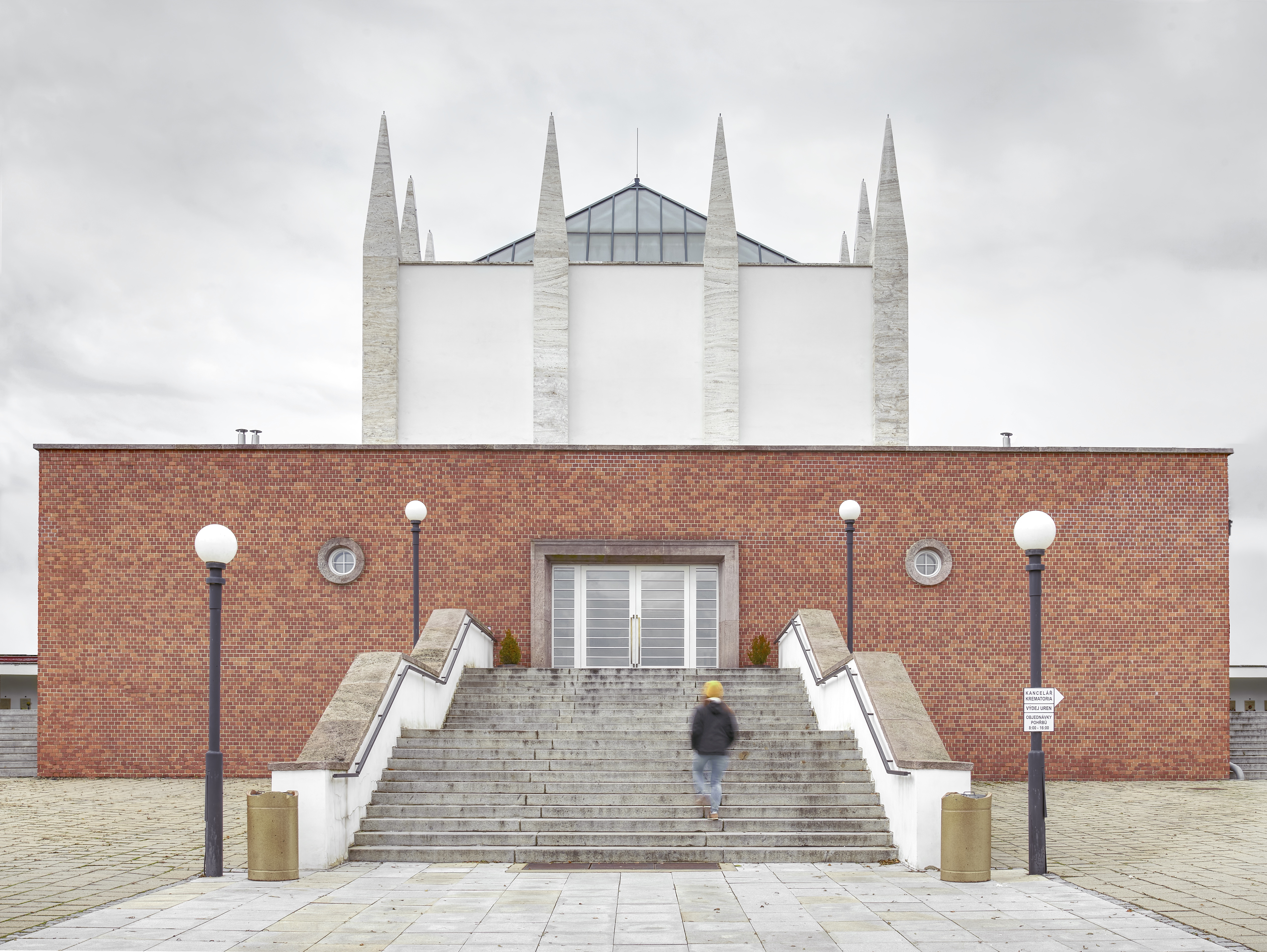
Crematorium in Brno

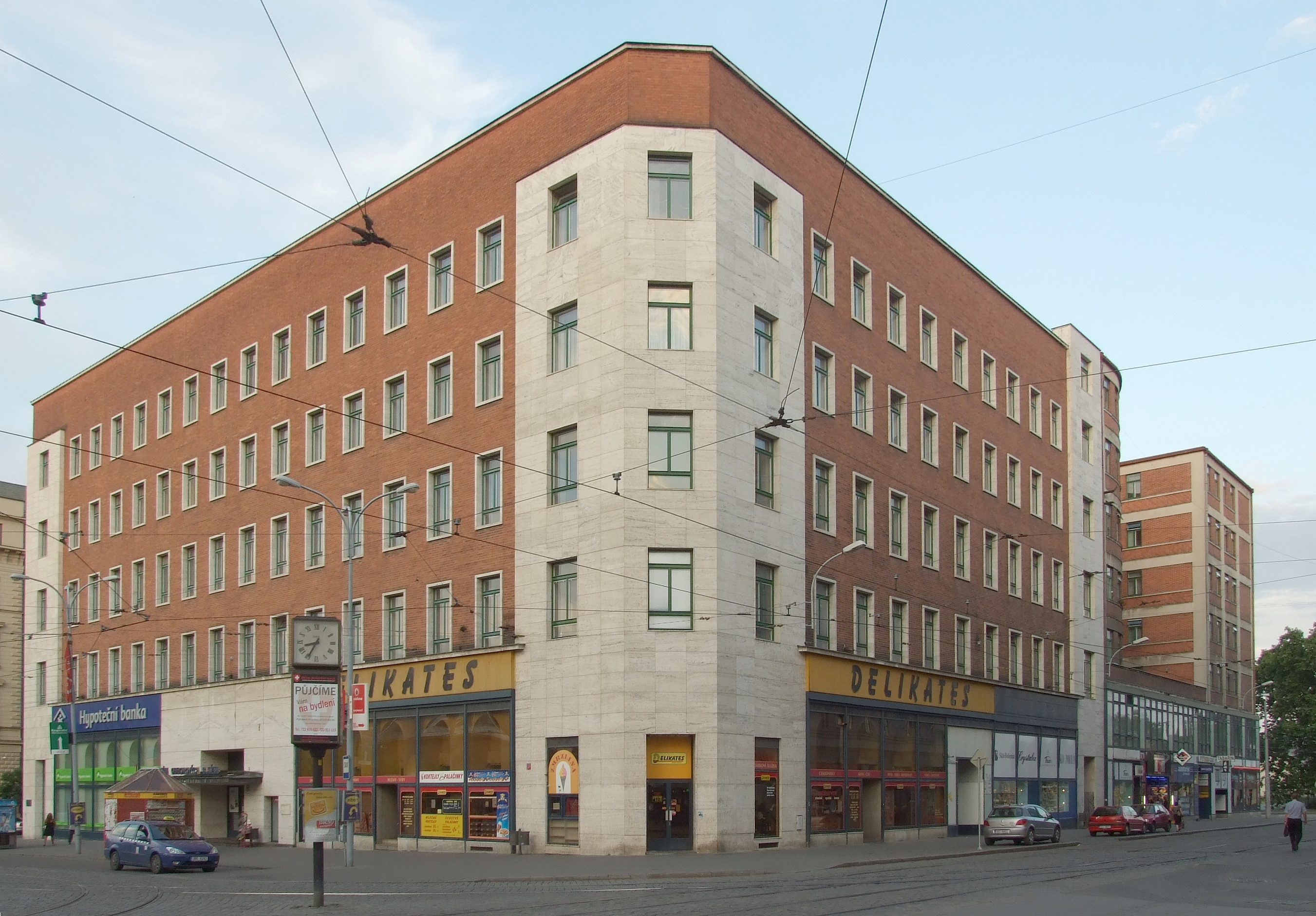
Block with the Moravia Palace in Brno today

== Architectural works in Brno ==
- Gutmannův dům (Gutmann's house) 1919–22
- Moravská zemská životní pojišťovna (Moravian Provincial Life Insurance Company) 1920–1923
- Böhmische Union Bank (later seat of local branch of the Czechoslovak Broadcast) 1923–26
- Krematorium (Crematorium) 1926–29
- Vila Stiassni 1927 - 1929
- Palác Morava (Palace Moravia) 1927–29. Completely finished in 1936
- Rodinný dvojdům (Double-family house) 1928
- Moravská banka (Moravian Bank) 1929–30, co-author Bohuslav Fuchs
- Činžovní dům Freundschaft (The Freundschaft ["Friendship"] tenement house) 1930–31
- Various family houses, industrial and manufacturing buildings around the City of Brno

== Sources ==
- Riedl, Dušan (1992). Brněnská architektura 20. století (in Czech). Brno: Památkový ústav Brno. Úřad města Brna. ISBN 80-85032-14-7.
- Ernst Wiesner 1890 - 1971, Obecní dům Brno 2005, ISBN 8023956132
- http://www.bam.brno.cz/en/architect/32-ernst-wiesner?filter=code
