= Všechovice (Brno-Country District) =

- Municipality
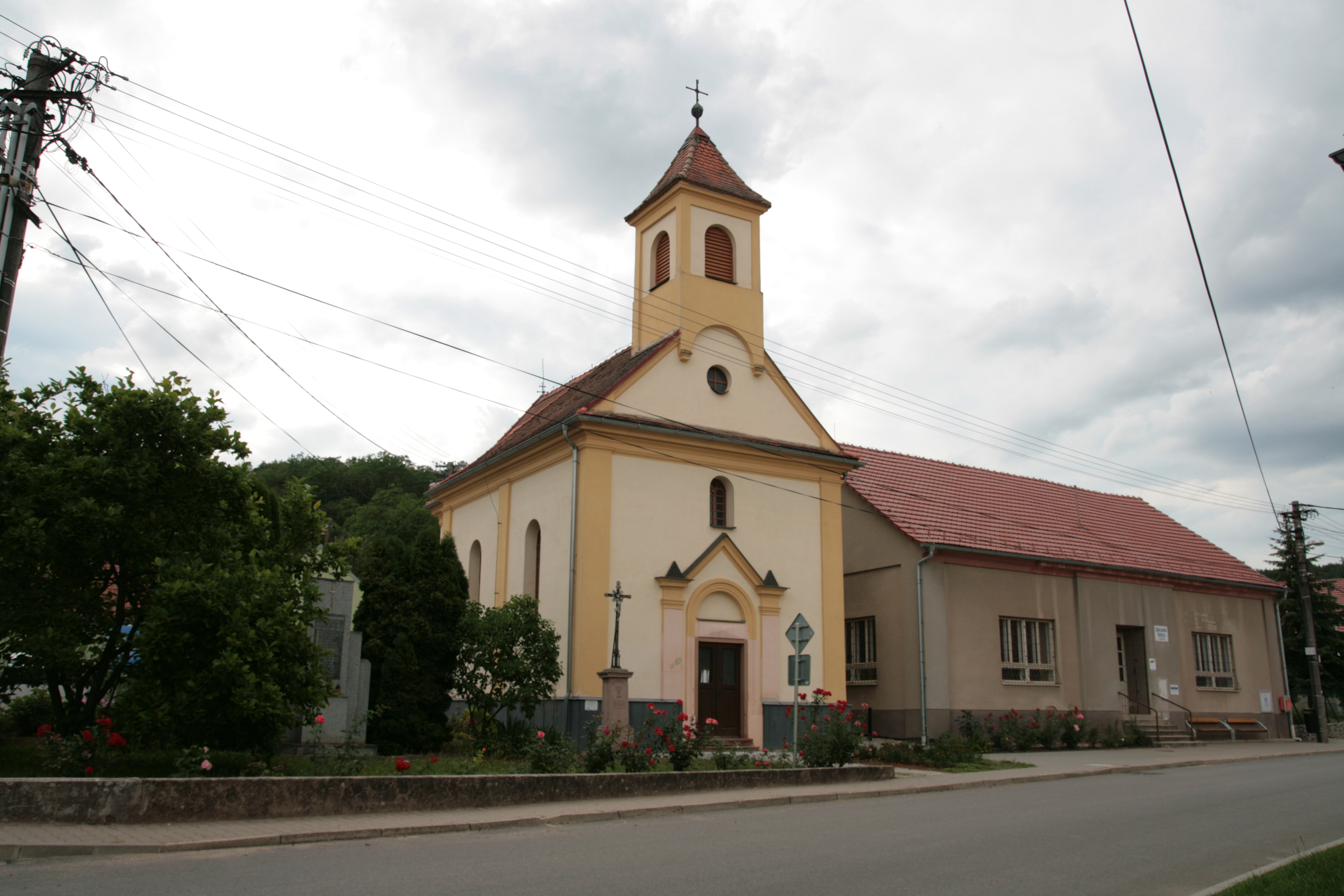
- Chapel of Saint Anne

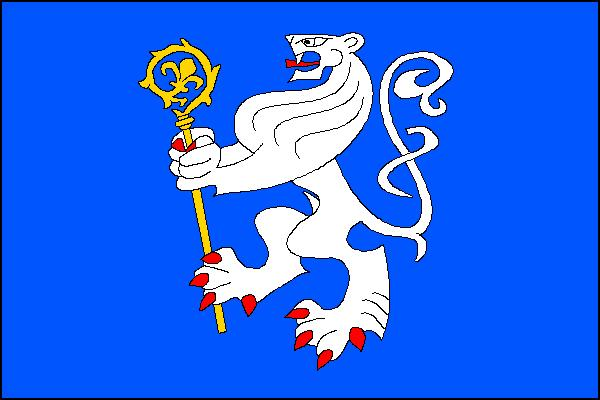
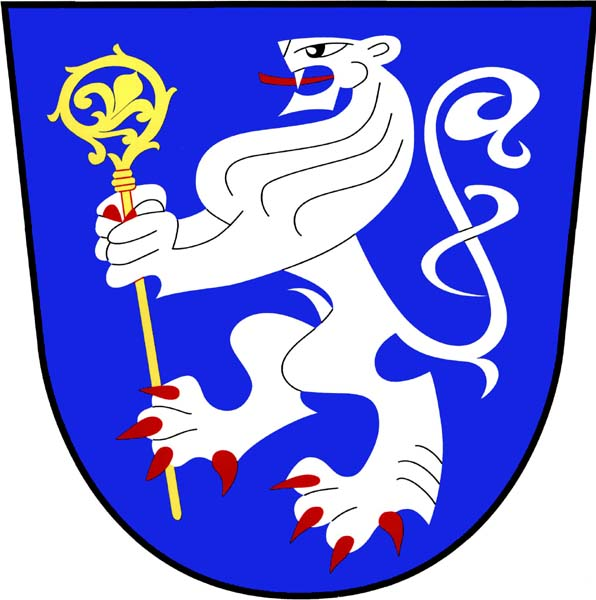
- Flag Coat of arms

- Location in the Czech Republic
- Coordinates: 49°21′26″N 16°29′39″E
- Country: Czech Republic
- Region: South Moravian
- District: Brno-Country
- First mentioned: 1239

Area
  - Total: 5.09 km^{2} (1.97 sq mi)
- Elevation: 310 m (1,020 ft)

Population (2026-01-01)
  - Total: 278
  - Density: 54.6/km^{2} (141/sq mi)
- Time zone: UTC+1 (CET)
  - Summer (DST): UTC+2 (CEST)
- Postal code: 666 03
- Website: www.vsechovice.cz

Všechovice is a municipality and village in Brno-Country District in the South Moravian Region of the Czech Republic. It has about 300 inhabitants.

Všechovice lies approximately 20 kilometres (12 mi) north-west of Brno and 170 km (110 mi) south-east of Prague.

== Demographics ==
Historical population
Year	Pop.	±%
1869	269	—
1880	304	+13.0%
1890	313	+3.0%
1900	330	+5.4%
1910	357	+8.2%
1921	345	−3.4%
1930	327	−5.2%
1950	301	−8.0%
1961	289	−4.0%
1970	239	−17.3%
1980	208	−13.0%
1991	182	−12.5%
2001	168	−7.7%
2011	232	+38.1%
2021	304	+31.0%
Source: Censuses
