= Všechovice (Přerov District) =

- Municipality
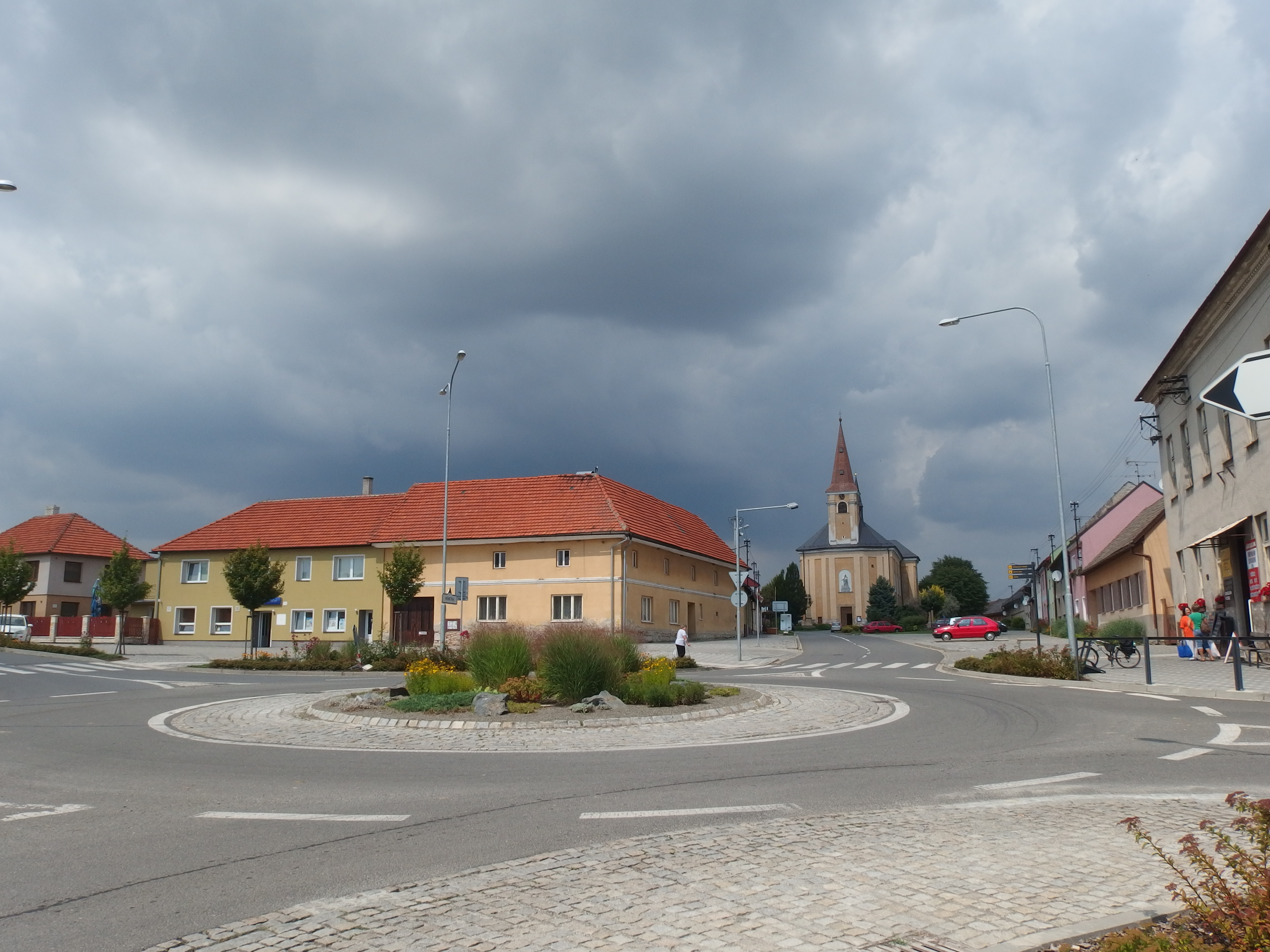
- Centre of Všechovice with the Church of the Holy Trinity

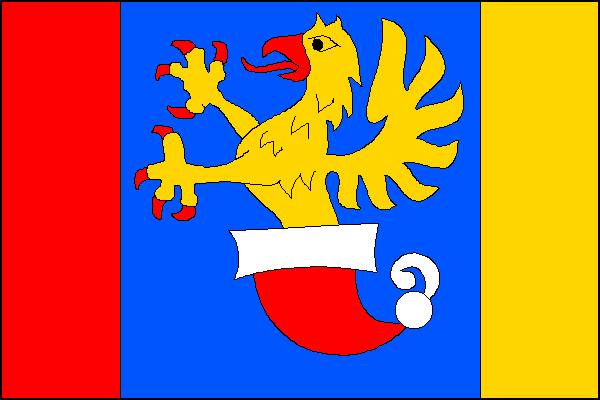
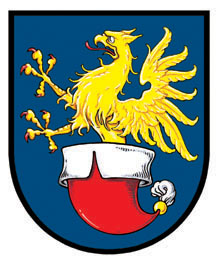
- Flag Coat of arms

- Location in the Czech Republic
- Coordinates: 49°27′46″N 17°45′29″E
- Country: Czech Republic
- Region: Olomouc
- District: Přerov
- First mentioned: 1281

Area
  - Total: 5.77 km^{2} (2.23 sq mi)
- Elevation: 346 m (1,135 ft)

Population (2026-01-01)
  - Total: 893
  - Density: 155/km^{2} (401/sq mi)
- Time zone: UTC+1 (CET)
  - Summer (DST): UTC+2 (CEST)
- Postal code: 753 53
- Website: www.vsechovice.eu

Všechovice is a municipality and village in Přerov District in the Olomouc Region of the Czech Republic. It has about 900 inhabitants.

Všechovice lies approximately 22 kilometres (14 mi) east of Přerov, 40 km (25 mi) east of Olomouc, and 250 km (160 mi) east of Prague.

== History ==
The first written mention of Všechovice is from 1281.

== Demographics ==
Historical population
| Year | Pop. | ±% |
|---|---|---|
| 1869 | 891 | — |
| 1880 | 971 | +9.0% |
| 1890 | 916 | −5.7% |
| 1900 | 844 | −7.9% |
| 1910 | 912 | +8.1% |
| 1921 | 840 | −7.9% |
| 1930 | 814 | −3.1% |
| 1950 | 784 | −3.7% |
| 1961 | 837 | +6.8% |
| 1970 | 793 | −5.3% |
| 1980 | 799 | +0.8% |
| 1991 | 889 | +11.3% |
| 2001 | 885 | −0.4% |
| 2011 | 864 | −2.4% |
| 2021 | 827 | −4.3% |
Source: Censuses

== Notable people ==
- Bohuslav Fuchs (1895–1977), architect
