= Lesná (Brno) =

- Cadastral territory of Brno
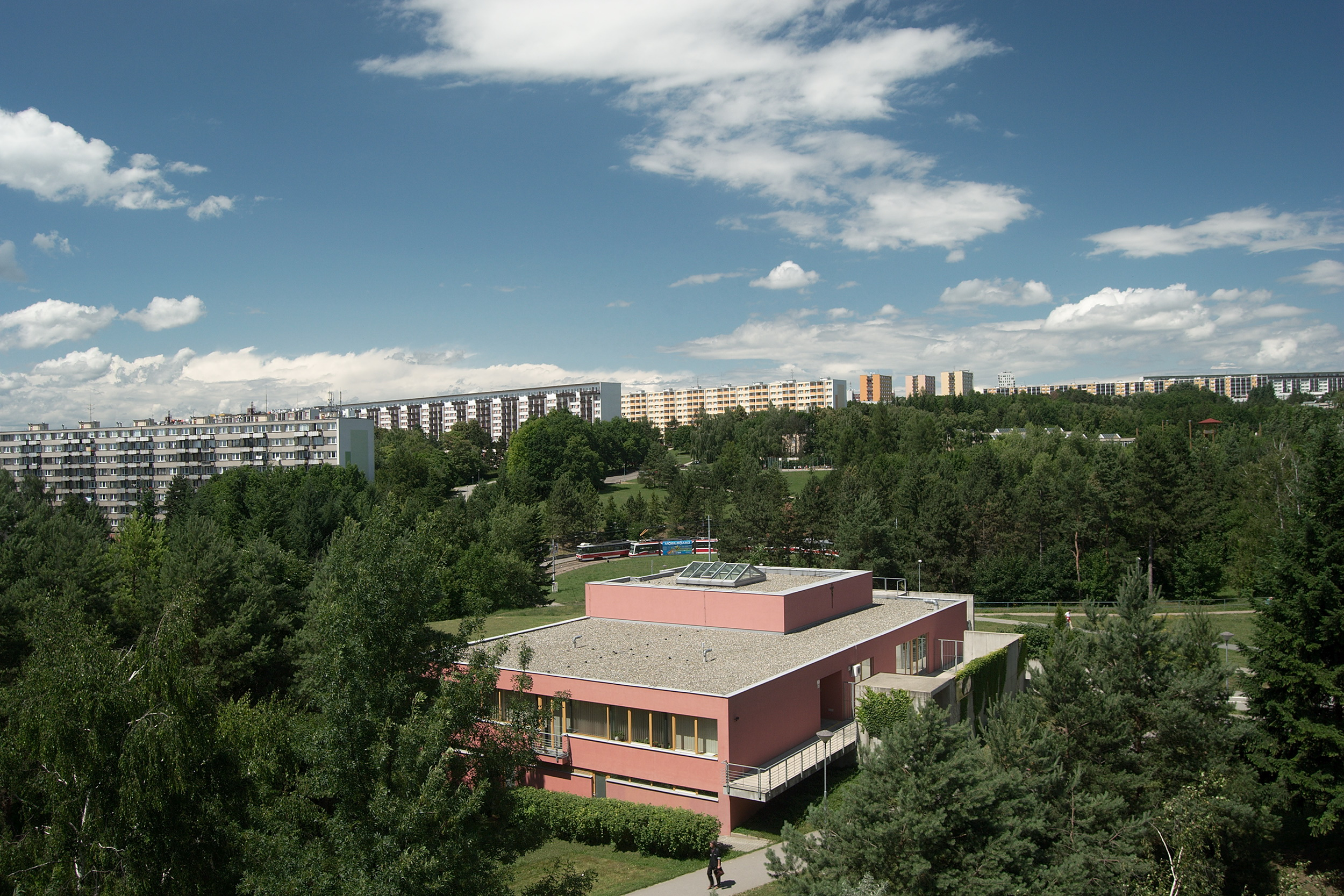
- View of the north part of Lesná

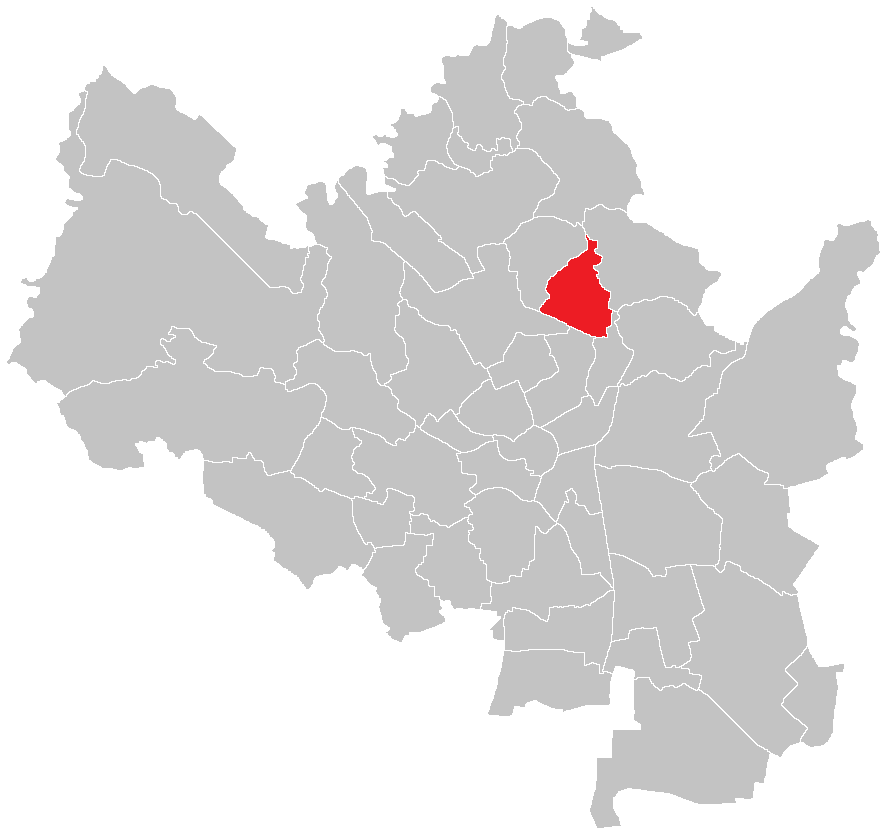
- Location of Lesná in Brno 49°13′43″N 16°37′26″E
- Country: Czech Republic
- Region: South Moravian Region
- City: Brno
- City district: Brno-sever

Area
  - Total: 2.58 km^{2} (1.00 sq mi)

Population (2021)
  - Total: 15,981
  - Density: 6,190/km^{2} (16,000/sq mi)
- Time zone: UTC+1 (CET)
  - Summer (DST): UTC+2 (CEST)
- Postal code: 612 00, 638 00

Lesná is a cadastral territory of Brno, Czech Republic, located in the northeastern part of the city. It has an area of 2.58 km^{2}. The area of the today's Lesná, then still practically undeveloped, was annexed to Brno as part of the creation of Greater Brno in 1919, and since November 24, 1990 has been part of the city district of Brno-sever. Almost 16,000 people live here, which is about a third of the population of the district.

Although most of the district consists of housing estates (paneláks), there are also family houses. The housing estate here, which was built during the 60s and 70s of the 20th century, is known as the most urbanistically successful housing estate in Brno. Thanks to the local greenery, proximity to the forest and relatively good accessibility, this district ranks among the most attractive parts of Brno and is compared to the Finnish Tapiola district near Helsinki.

Neighboring cadastral territories are Sadová in the northwest, Soběšice in the north, Obřany in the east, Husovice in the southeast (with which Lesná is immediately connected), Černá Pole in the south and Královo Pole in the southwest.

== History ==
Modern Lesná is spread over lands that, until the 1960s, belonged to the cadastral territories of Královo Pole (approximately half of the Lesná cadastral territory in the west), Husovice (less than the entire eastern half and the north of Lesná) and Obřany (the northeastern edge of the Lesná cadastre on the east side of Seifertova Street and Kupkova Street and surroundings). The border between the Královo Pole and Husovice parts ran west of Čertova rokle.

According to the project of Viktor Rudiš, Ivan Veselý and František Zounek, the new panel housing estate Lesná was built between 1962 and 1973. It was originally called Za Tišnovku ('Behind Tišnovka') due to its location behind the railway line Tišnovka, but on March 24, 1963, it got its current name. Extensive planting of greenery took place throughout the housing estate. As a result of the second cadastral reform of Brno from 1966 to 1969, the new cadastral territory of Lesná was created in 1969.

In April 1997, a new project of Ing. architect Miroslav Kolofík followed with the construction of the modern apartment complex Majdalenky I. in the north of Lesná on the north side of Okružní Street, completed in December 2000. In the following years, the Nové Majdalenky housing complex was built north of it, which loosely follows on from the previous one.

Ever since the establishment of the housing estate, locals have sought to build their own church, but it was only in 2017–2020 that the Church of the Blessed Maria Restituta was built in Nezvalová Street, above the Čertova rokle loop.

In December 2006, a train stop called Brno-Lesná was opened here.

== Description ==
The vast majority of the district consists of panel housing, built on a gentle slope above the road connecting Královo Pole and Husovice and above the railway line Brno – Havlíčkův Brod. There are many green areas and groves between the individual houses. A circular road leads through the housing estate (Okružní and Seifertova streets), the deep wooded Čertova kolle passes through the center of the housing estate, in which there is an amphitheater, which, however, has not been used for concert purposes for a long time. In the west, on the border with the neighboring cadastral territory of Sadová, there is a deep forested valley "U Antoníčka", in which (on plots that no longer belong to Lesná, but to Sadová and thus simultaneously to the Brno-Královo Pole district) there is a chapel of Saint Antoníček with the well "U Antoníčka", then Zaječí potok below.

In the place of today's housing estate, there were several ravines, which were mostly filled in, only Čertova rokle remained. However, the unstable subsoil in the buried areas later caused the cracking of some of the buildings standing on it, such as the shop in Loosova Street.

Thanks to the successful urban layout of the housing estate, it was proposed in 2004 that Lesná become an urban heritage zone, which would protect this whole from further uncontrolled construction.

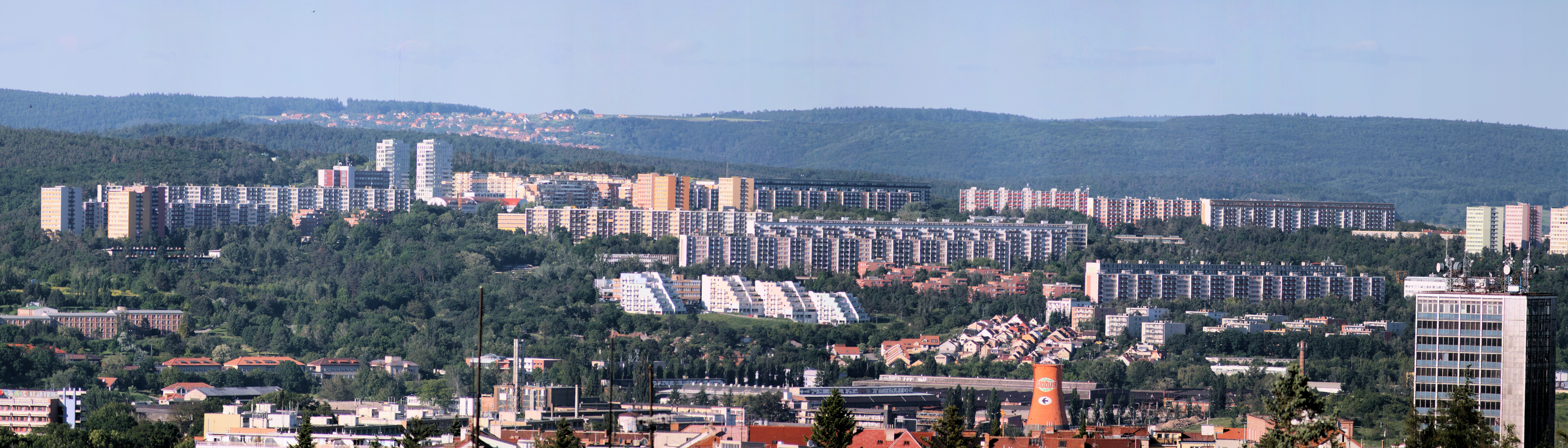
Panorama of Lesná

== Territorial divisions ==
The cadastral territory of Lesná is further divided into 5 basic settlement units.

Basic settlement unit	Population		
Basic settlement unit	2011	2021	Change
Studená	1,711	1,679	-1.9%
Heleny Malířové-Haškova	6,496	6,196	-4.6%
Slavíčkova-Ibsenova	4,107	4,106	-0.0%
Loosova	3,334	3,503	+5.1%
Divišova čtvrť	504	497	-1.4%

== Demographics ==
Historical population
Year	Pop.	±%
1970	20,069	—
1980	20,355	+1.4%
1991	16,655	−18.2%
2001	15,154	−9.0%
2011	16,152	+6.6%
2021	15,981	−1.1%
Source: Censuses

As of the 2021 census, the population is 15,981, down from 16,152 in the 2011 census.

== Religion ==
In the southern part of Lesná in Nezvalova Street, near the last tram stop, the building of the Martin Středa and Marie Restituta community center was built at the beginning of the 21st century, which is the center of the local parish. The Church of Blessed Mary of the Restitution was built in the neighborhood of the complex in 2017–2020.

== Sport ==
In 1957, the Start Brno Physical Education Unit was founded, which runs 8 sports (soccer, floorball, track golf (minigolf), archery, netball, hiking, skiing and tennis). It is located on Loosova Street in the northern part of the district.
