= Brno-sever =

- City District of Brno
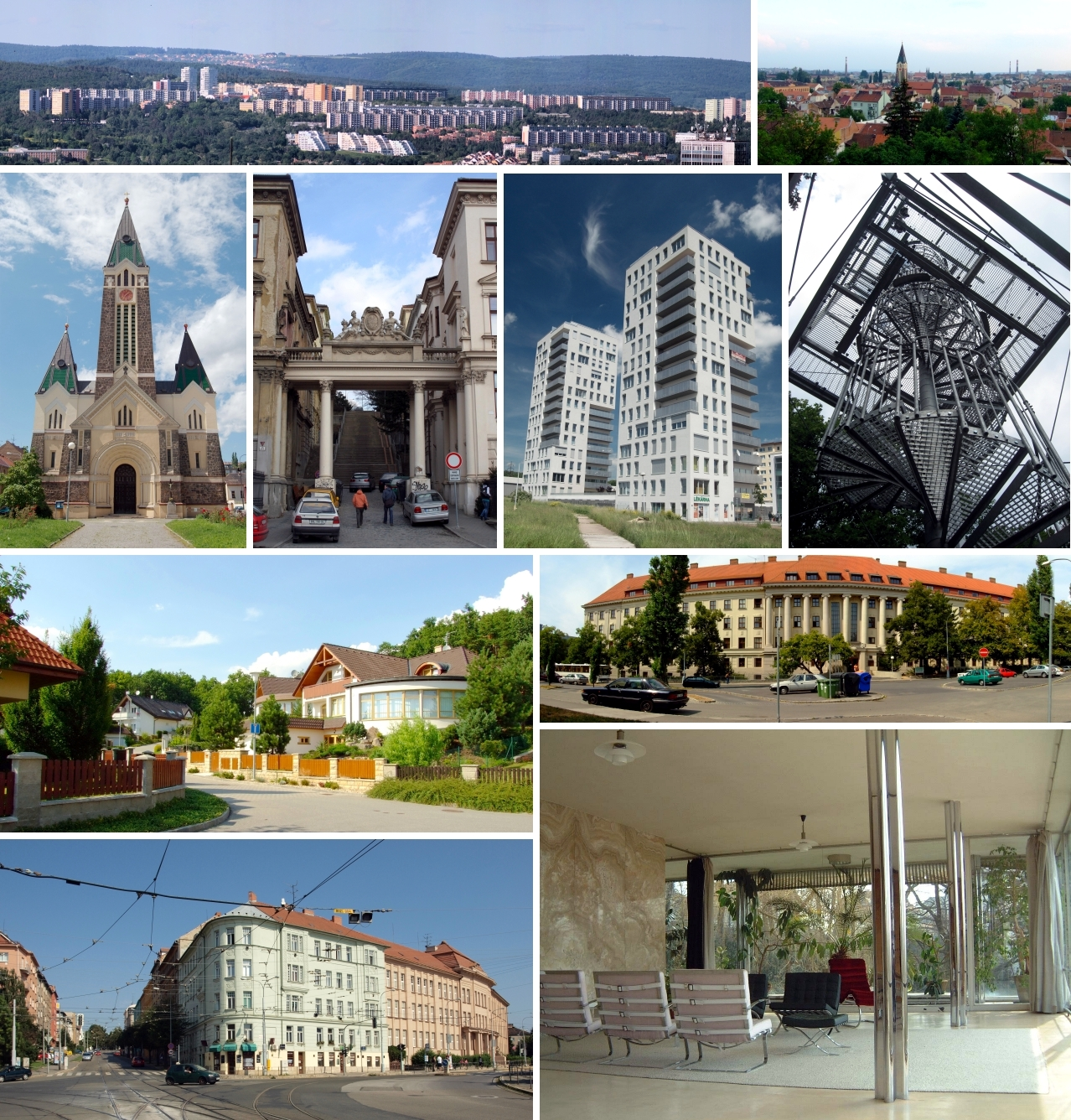

- Flag Coat of arms

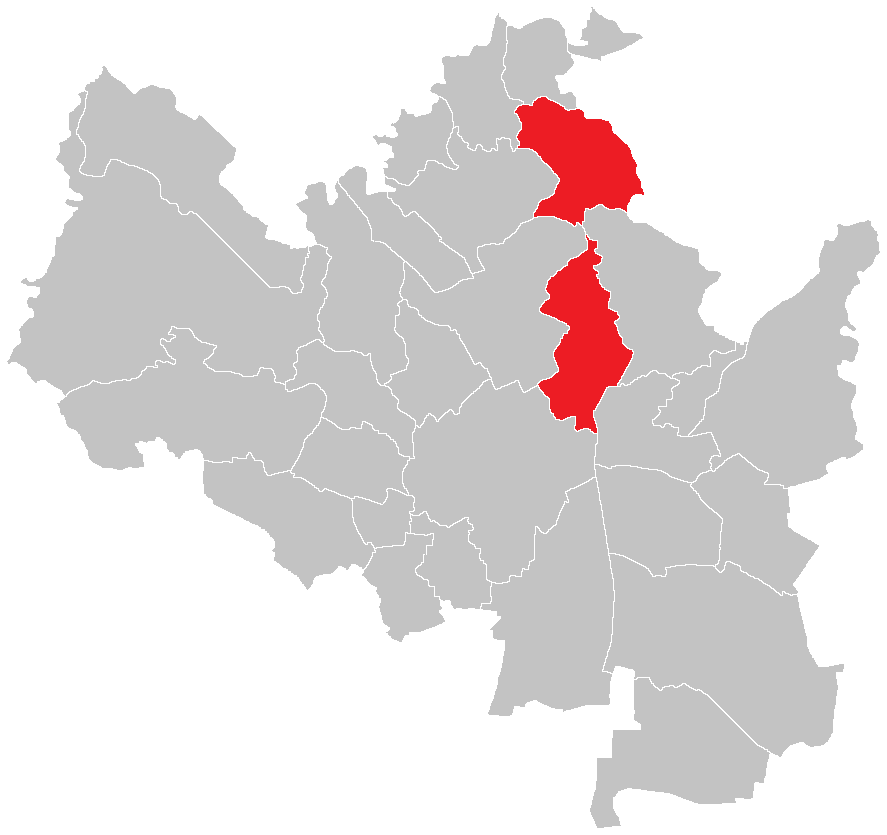
- Location of Brno-sever in Brno 49°12′54″N 16°37′35″E
- Country: Czech Republic
- Region: South Moravian Region
- City: Brno

Government
  - Mayor: Martin Maleček (SOL)

Area
  - Total: 12.24 km^{2} (4.73 sq mi)

Population (2021)
  - Total: 48,382
  - Density: 3,953/km^{2} (10,240/sq mi)
- Time zone: UTC+1 (CET)
  - Summer (DST): UTC+2 (CEST)
- Postal code: 602 00
- Website: https://www.sever.brno.cz/

Brno-sever (lit. 'Brno-North') is one of the 29 city districts of Brno, Czech Republic, located in the north side of the city. It is made up of the municipal parts and cadastral territories of Husovice, Lesná and Soběšice and parts of Černá Pole and Zábrdovice. The total area is 12.24 km². The city district was established on November 24, 1990, and its office is located in Zábrdovice.

For the purposes of the senate elections, Brno-sever is included in electoral district number 60 of the Brno-City District.

== History ==
=== Urban development ===
The oldest parts of Brno-sever are the former villages of Husovice, Soběšice and Zábrdovice, whose development dates back to the Middle Ages. The suburban villa and residential development of Černá Pole was created only during the 19th and 20th centuries, as well as the "New Husovice" around the Republic Square. In the interwar period, workers' quarters also grew up here, both planned (e.g. semi-detached houses on Míčková street according to the project of Bohuslav Fuchs) and emergency ones (Divišova čtvrť, Písečník). An important change was the construction of the new "Tišnovka" in the early 1950s and the subsequent cancellation of the original line that separated Husovice from Zábrdovice and Černá Pole.

Overall, the youngest district of Brno-sever is Lesná, whose panel development was created in the 1960s and 1970s. years of the 20th century. Around the same time (1960s-1980s), panel houses also grew up in Černá Pole. Panel housing did not appear in the other districts of the modern city district. In the 1980s, Brno's large urban ring road was cut through the original Husovice semi-detached house (Tomek Square) as a significant urban intervention. In the years 1996–1998, the Husovice tunnel was built as part of the circuit on the territory of the city district, thanks to which the traffic in Černá Pole on Provazníkova and Merhautova streets was relieved. As a follow-up to this tunnel, a major reconstruction of the intersection at Tomek Square into a level crossing is underway from 2021, in connection with which some other remnants of the old development were disposed of.

=== Administrative development ===
From a historical point of view, the territory of the modern city district of Brno-sever includes the entire cadastre of the former town of Husovice and the former municipality of Soběšice, parts of the original cadastres of Královo Pole, Zábrdovice, Dolní a Horní Cejl, Obřany and a small part of the original cadastres of Velká Nová Ulice and Červená. The territory of the modern Brno-sever district was divided into these cadastral territories until the second cadastral reform from the second half of the 1960s, while the boundaries of these units were modified several times throughout history.

The territory of the Brno-sever district was gradually annexed to Brno in several stages: on July 6, 1850, Dolní and Horní Cejl, Velká Nová Ulice and Zábrdovice were annexed; On October 23, 1912, some lands originally belonging to Královo Pole; On April 16, 1919, Husovice, Obřany and the rest of the area of Královo Pole were annexed; On November 26, 1971, Soběšice was the last to be annexed to Brno.

The modern cioty district of Brno-sever was established on November 24, 1990, on most of the territory of the former Brno III municipal district, from which several districts were separated when it was abolished, the residents of which expressed dissatisfaction with the existing membership of this district and its functioning after the Velvet Revolution (for example, Maloměřice and Obřany that created their own district). On May 1, 1998, Brno-sever was additionally expanded by the addition of part of the Zábrdovice cadastral territory based on an agreement with neighboring Brno-střed.

The incoherence and compactness of the city district (extraordinary in the Brno context) sometimes led to tendencies to break away from a district (e.g. in 2014 in Lesná), but these views have never received sufficient support.

== Description ==
The urban part of Brno-sever is located on the edge of the Brno basin, from its lower part of the territory it rises over the Lesná terrace to the forested upland plains in the Soběšice cadastral area. The urban part has a very uneven structure and, as a result of its demarcation, a rather atypical shape resembling an hourglass. With the exception of Soběšice, which has the character of a large village surrounded by a forest, the rest of the township has a distinctly urban character with various types of development (large-city apartment blocks, terraced family houses, villa development, panel housing estates). The district office is located on the very southern edge of the territory, in the cadastral area of Zábrdovice.

On the territory of Brno-sever there are, for example, the buildings of the Mendel University in Brno, the regional Trade Office, the Museum of Romani Culture, a children's hospital, the MIMI FORTUNAE Dance Theater, the Poor Clares Monastery in Šibešice or the Villa Tugendhat, the only UNESCO monument in Brno. There are also several parks, for example Schreber's gardens (former Zábrdovice cemetery) or Marie Restituta park (former Husovice cemetery).

There are three churches in the district, the oldest of which is the Art Nouveau church of the Sacred Heart of the Lord from the beginning of the 20th century in Husovice. Others are the Church of the Immaculate Conception of the Virgin Mary near the Poor Clares monastery in Sobešice from the 1990s and the Church of the Blessed Mary Restituta in Lesná, completed in 2020. The only operating cemetery in Brno-sever is the Soběšice forest cemetery.

== Demographics ==
As of the 2021 census, the population is 48,382, up 1.6% from 47,643 in the 2011 census. The population peaked at 64,251 in 1970.

Historical population

Year	Pop.	±%
1869	2,591	—
1880	4,050	+56.3%
1890	7,568	+86.9%
1900	9,497	+25.5%
1910	12,010	+26.5%

Year	Pop.	±%
1921	12,008	−0.0%
1930	15,775	+31.4%
1950	18,590	+17.8%
1961	63,261	+240.3%
1970	64,251	+1.6%

Year	Pop.	±%
1980	56,819	−11.6%
1991	46,808	−17.6%
2001	45,908	−1.9%
2011	47,643	+3.8%
2021	48,382	+1.6%

Source: Censuses

== Transportation ==
A number of busy traffic arteries pass through the territory of the city, especially the part of the route of the Road I/42 (VMO), which passes through Provazníková street, Husovice tunnel and Porgesová street. Other busy streets include Cejl, Dukelská třída, Merhautova, Okružní, Seifertova, Generála Píky and Vranovská streets.

Public transport between individual districts of the city district and the rest of Brno is provided by the Public Transport Company of the City of Brno as part of the Integrated Transport System of the South Moravian Region. Important are tram lines 3, 4, 5, 7 and 9 (also 2 on the outskirts), trolleybus lines 25 and 26 and bus lines 43 (to Soběšice), 44, 46 (Černá Pole–Lesná), 57 (Husovice–Lesná– Soběšice) and 84. Night transport is provided by bus lines 92, 93 (Černá Pole, Lesná, Soběšice), 94 (Husovice) and marginally 97 and 99 (Cejl). Husovice is also home to one of Brno's three trolleybus depots.

Brno-sever also has a Brno-Lesná railway stop on the Brno–Tišnov line (train line S3).
