= Maria Restituta Kafka =

Austrian nurse, religious sister, and martyr

Blessed Maria Restituta Kafka SFCC
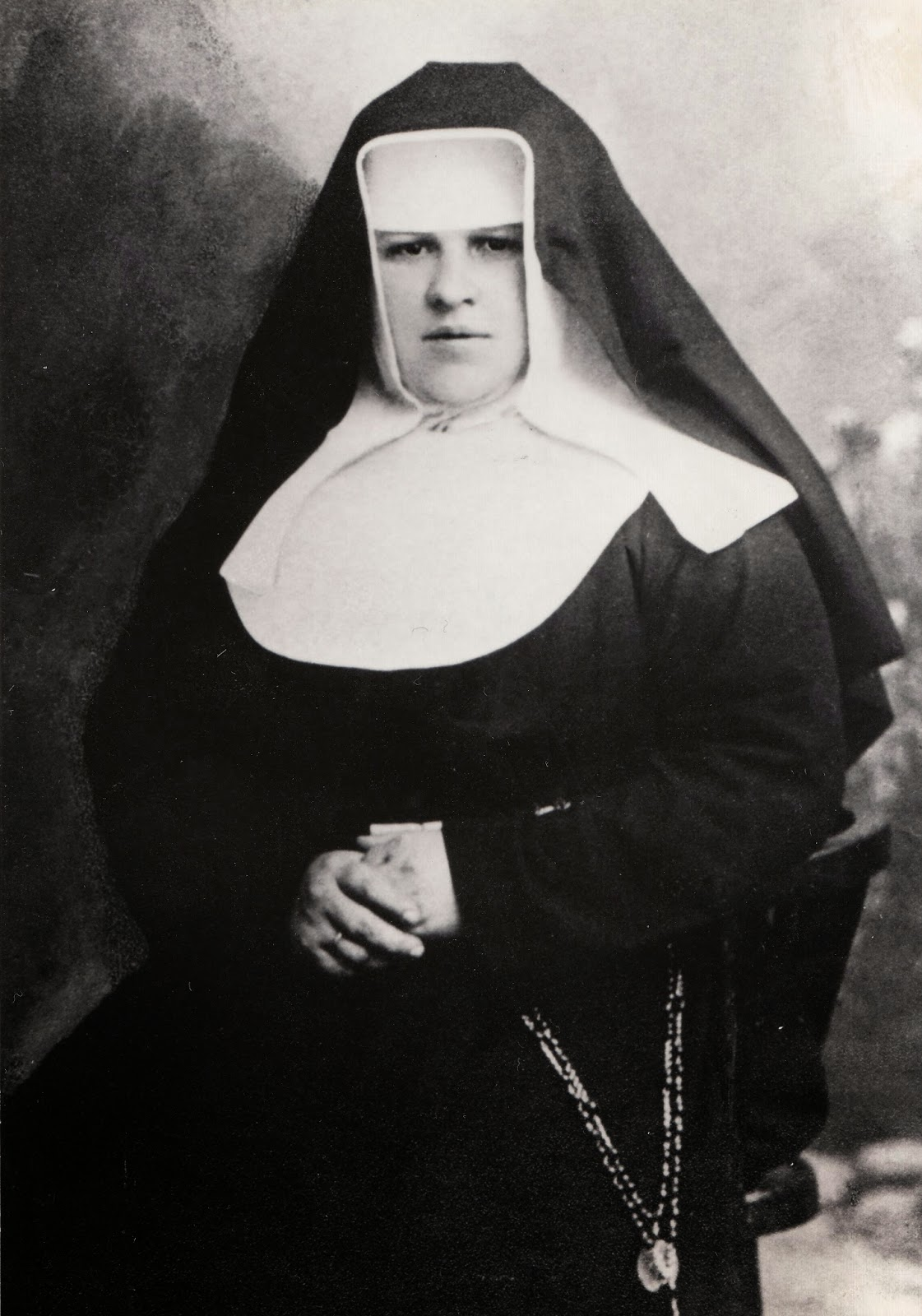
- Kafka, c. 1919

Virgin and martyr
- Born: Helene Kafka; 1 May 1894; Husovice, Margraviate of Moravia, Austria-Hungary
- Died: 30 March 1943 (aged 48); Vienna, Nazi Germany
- Venerated in: Roman Catholic Church
- Beatified: 21 June 1998, Vienna, Austria by Pope John Paul II
- Feast: 30 March, 29 October (in the archdiocese of Vienna)

Maria Restituta Kafka (1 May 1894 – 30 March 1943) was an Austrian nurse of Czech descent and religious sister of the Franciscan Sisters of Christian Charity (Sorores Franciscanae a Caritate Christiana). Executed by the government in Nazi-run Austria, she is honoured as a virgin and martyr in the Catholic Church. Pope John Paul II beatified her in 1998.

== Life ==
=== Early life ===
She was born Helene Kafka in Husovice, near Brno, on 1 May 1894, the sixth daughter of Anton Kafka, a shoemaker, and his wife, Maria Stehlík. When she was two years old, her family moved to the Brigittenau neighbourhood of Vienna, the imperial capital, and home to a Czech migrant community, where she grew up. As a young girl, she worked first as a housemaid and then as a salesgirl in a tobacco shop. In 1913 she became a nurse at the municipal hospital in the Lainz neighborhood of the city.

While working as a nurse, Kafka met members of the Franciscan Sisters of Christian Charity (German: Franziskanerinnen von der christlichen Liebe) and entered their congregation the following year, at the age of 20. She was given the religious name of Maria Restituta, after the 4th-century martyr Restituta. After her completion of the novitiate and her profession of simple vows in the congregation, Sr. Restituta returned to work at the Lainz Hospital, where she remained until 1919. While working there, she promoted the practice of holistic medicine for the patients.

In 1919, after the First World War, Kafka was transferred to a hospital in the suburban town of Mödling, eventually becoming its leading surgical nurse.

=== Conflict and martyrdom ===
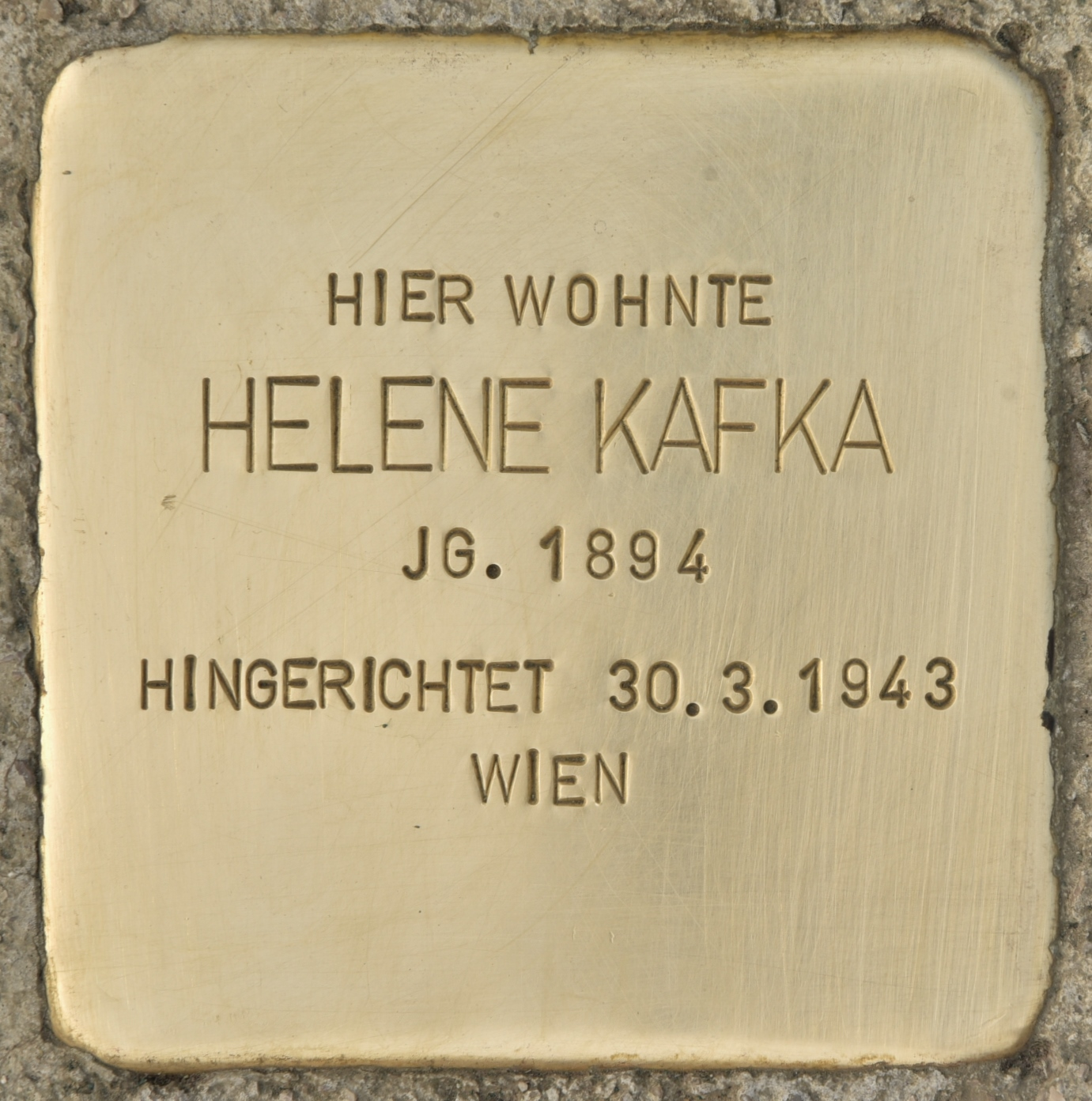
Stolperstein for Kafka in Mödling

The Mödling hospital was not spared the effects of the 1938 Anschluss, in which Germany annexed Austria. Kafka was very vocal in her opposition to the new regime, which had immediately begun to implement the Nuremberg Laws established by the Nazi Party in Germany upon its acquisition of power. She called Hitler a "madman" and said of herself that "a Viennese cannot keep her mouth shut". When a new hospital wing was constructed, Kafka kept to traditional Catholic practice and hung a crucifix in every room. The Nazi authorities demanded that the crosses be taken down, threatening her dismissal, but she refused. The crucifixes were not removed, nor was Kafka dismissed, since her community said that they could not replace her.

Kafka continued in her vocal criticism of the Nazi government and several years later was denounced by a doctor who strongly supported the regime. On Ash Wednesday 1942 (18 February of that year), while coming out of the operating theater, Kafka was arrested by the Gestapo and accused, not only of hanging the crucifixes, but also of having dictated a poem mocking Hitler. On 29 October 1942 she was sentenced to death by the guillotine by the Volksgerichtshof for "favouring the enemy and conspiracy to commit high treason." The authorities offered to release her if she would leave the convent, but she refused.

When a request for clemency reached the desk of Martin Bormann, head of the Nazi Party Chancellery, he replied that her execution would provide "effective intimidation" for others who might want to resist the Nazis. Kafka spent the rest of her days in prison, where she was noted for caring for other prisoners. During this period, she wrote in a letter from the prison:

It does not matter how far we are separated from everything, no matter what is taken from us: the faith that we carry in our hearts is something no one can take from us. In this way we build an altar in our own hearts.

After her imprisonment on Ash Wednesday 1942, Restituta Kafka spent over one year on death row. On 30 March 1943, she was beheaded in the Vienna Regional Court. She was 48 years old.

== Veneration ==
On 21 June 1998, on the occasion of Pope John Paul II's visit to Vienna, Kafka was beatified. She was the first virgin martyr of Vienna.

Maria Restituta Kafka, the only religious sister to be formally condemned to death in the area of the "Greater Germanic Reich," was commemorated in Rome on the evening of 4 March 2013, in the Basilica of San Bartolomeo all'Isola on Tiber Island, with a liturgy of the word at which Cardinal Christoph Schönborn presided. During the service, the Franciscan Sisters of Christian Charity handed to the basilica a small cross which Kafka had worn on the belt of her religious habit. The relic was placed in the chapel there which remembers the martyrs of National Socialism.

In Restituta Kafka's honour, the western half of Weyprechtgasse, a lane running before Mödling Hospital, was renamed Schwester-Maria-Restituta-Gasse. Also there is a park named in her honour in her native Husovice: Park Marie Restituty. Near the location of her birthplace a church dedicated to her was consecrated in September 2020.
