= Černá Pole =

- Cadastral territory of Brno
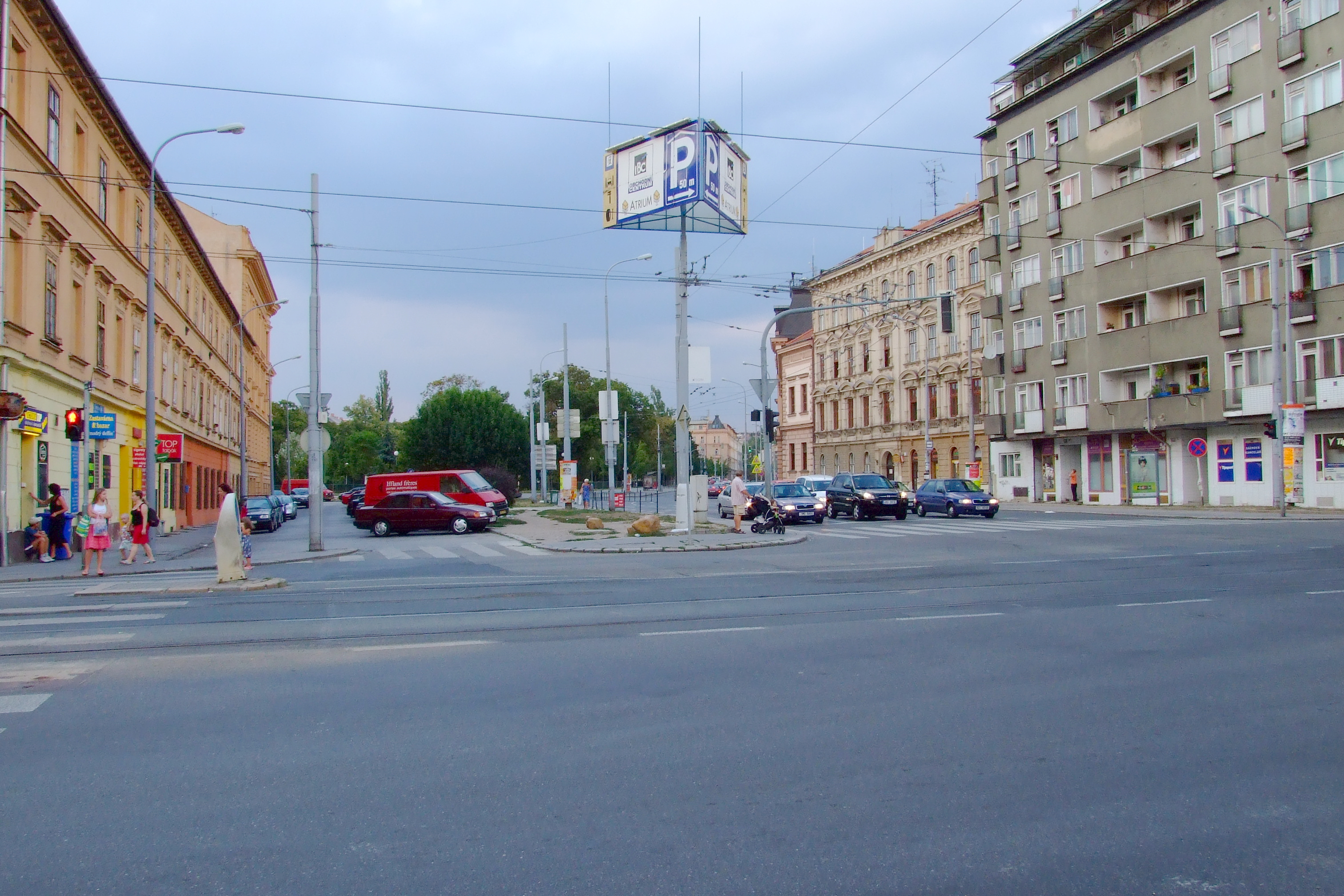
- 28. října Square

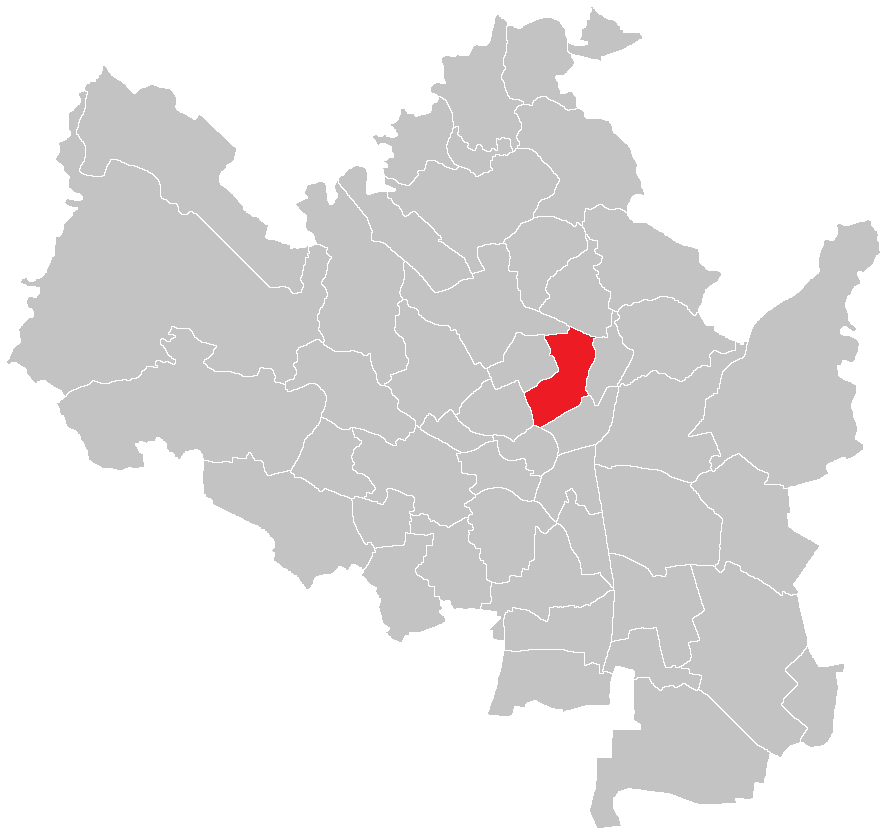
- Location of Černá Pole in Brno 49°12′57″N 16°37′20″E
- Country: Czech Republic
- Region: South Moravian Region
- District: Brno-City
- City: Brno
- City district: Brno-Královo Pole, Brno-sever, Brno-střed

Area
  - Total: 2.46 km^{2} (0.95 sq mi)

Population (2021)
  - Total: 20,412
  - Density: 8,300/km^{2} (21,500/sq mi)
- Time zone: UTC+1 (CET)
  - Summer (DST): UTC+2 (CEST)
- Postal code: 602 00, 613 00

Černá Pole (German: Schwarzfeld, Hantec: Blekfild, lit. 'Black Fields') is a municipal part and cadastral territory of the city of Brno in the Czech Republic, located in the central part of the city. It has an area of 2.46 km^{2}. The territory of modern Černá Pole was gradually annexed to Brno in parts in 1850, 1912 and 1919. Since 24 November 1990, Černá Pole has been divided between the city districts of Brno-sever (most of the territory), Brno-střed (south-western part with Lužánky park) and Brno-Královo Pole (a small part in the northwest). Over 20,000 people live here.

== History ==
According to the color of the soil, this area was called Černá pole (meaning black fields in Czech), later identical to the current name Černá Pole.

If we leave aside the development of Lidická streets (emerging since the 13th century) and the area around Kapitána Jaroš and 28. Října Square (which form a separate entity from an urban planning point of view), the development of the residential district on the plateau above Lužánky only began in the 1860s. century, while the local children's hospital was opened as early as 1898. Until that time, this part of Černá Pole, which today belongs to Brno-sever, was completely undeveloped with many orchards and vineyards. At that time, the territory of Černá Pole belonged to several cadastral territories: the westernmost part, approximately coinciding with the part belonging to the Brno-střed district since 1990, was part of the Velká Nová Ulice district (after 1919, Velká Nová Ulice and Červená), to the east of this part there is a part then belonging to the Horní and Dolní Cejl district, further to the east there is a part then belonging to the Zábrdovice cadastral territory (bounded by Jugoslávská and Mathonová streets), northeast of Černá Pole, encompassing, among other things, today's Štefánikova čtvrť and its surroundings, it belonged to the cadastral territory of Husovice, the rest of the cadastre belonged to Královo Pole, which originally had interestingly shaped outcrops, the western of which extended onto the land of the Mendel University and the eastern represented a wedge extending to Schreber's gardens.

The western part of Černá Pole was annexed to Brno as early as 1850, then, in 1912, both Královo Pole outposts were annexed to Brno (however, the north of the cadastre still belonged to Královo Pole), and in 1919 Husovice and Královo Pole were also annexed to Brno with the remaining parts of modern Černá Pole.

From the turn of the 19th and 20th centuries, one of the first villa districts in Brno was created here. Creation continued with flourishing in the years between the two world wars, when, for example, the Villa Tugendhat was built here, and it was completed only in the period of so-called socialist realism. The authorities reacted to the densification of the development by changing the cadastral boundaries in the territory of Černá Pole - in 1929, the boundaries of Horní and Dolní Cejl, Husovice and Královo Pole were changed, and in 1939 the border between the Horní and Dolní Cejl cadastral territories and the Velká Nová Ulice and Červená, on a line that coincides with the section of the modern border of the Brno-sever and Brno-střed districts, which runs along the lines of Drobného and Traubova streets.

As part of the reambulation of Brno, consisting, among other things, of extensive changes in cadastral territories, on January 1, 1970, a new cadastral territory, Černá Pole, was created on this territory, and on July 1, 1979, the eastern part of the canceled cadastral territory of Lužánky also became part of it. From 1971 to 1990, Černá Pole, together with the eastern part of the then cadastral territory of Lužánky, was part of the Brno III municipal district. Since November 24, 1990, Černá Pole is divided between the city districts of Brno-sever, Brno-střed and Brno-Královo Pole.

== Urbanism ==
The neighborhood is dominated by two and multi-story apartment buildings. In addition to apartment buildings, there are also panel houses, family houses and villas here. There is also a relative abundance of greenery in practically all blocks, which increases the quality of living in this district. The Štefánikova čtvrť quarter, located in the northeast of Černá Pole, is a relatively independent complex. The development of the former district of Lužánky is also a fully urbanistically separate part, which is also home to the largest and most important park in Brno, Lužánky. Another important park in Černá Pole are Schreber's gardens. The axis of Černá Pole is represented by Merhautova street, which, together with Provazníkova and Drobného streets, is one of the most important traffic arteries of the district.

== Territorial divisions ==
Černá Pole is further divided into 11 basic settlement units.

Basic settlement unit	Population		
Basic settlement unit	2011	2021	Change
Demlova	2,192	2,201	+0.4%
Fakulta Mendelovy univerzity	189	361	+91.0%
Hoblíkova	2,460	2,421	-1.6%
Krkoškova	3,262	3,220	-1.3%
Lužánky	0	0	+0%
Merhautova	4,506	4,437	-1.5%
Nad arboretem	2	49	+2,350.0%
Náměstí SNP	2,342	2,241	-4.3%
Schodová	1,838	2,006	+9.1%
Třída Kpt. Jaroše	2,053	2,304	+12.2%
Vysoká škola zemědělská	1,233	1,172	-4.9%

== Demographics ==
Historical population
Year	Pop.	±%
1961	44,792	—
1970	34,235	−23.6%
1980	28,142	−17.8%
1991	23,627	−16.0%
2001	21,591	−8.6%
2011	20,077	−7.0%
2021	20,412	+1.7%
Source: Censuses

As of the 2021 census, the population is 20,412, up 1% from 20,077 in the 2011 census. The population peaked at 44,792 in 1961.

== Notable institutions ==
- Mendel University in Brno
- Brno children's hospital
