= Sadová (Brno) =

- Cadastral territory of Brno
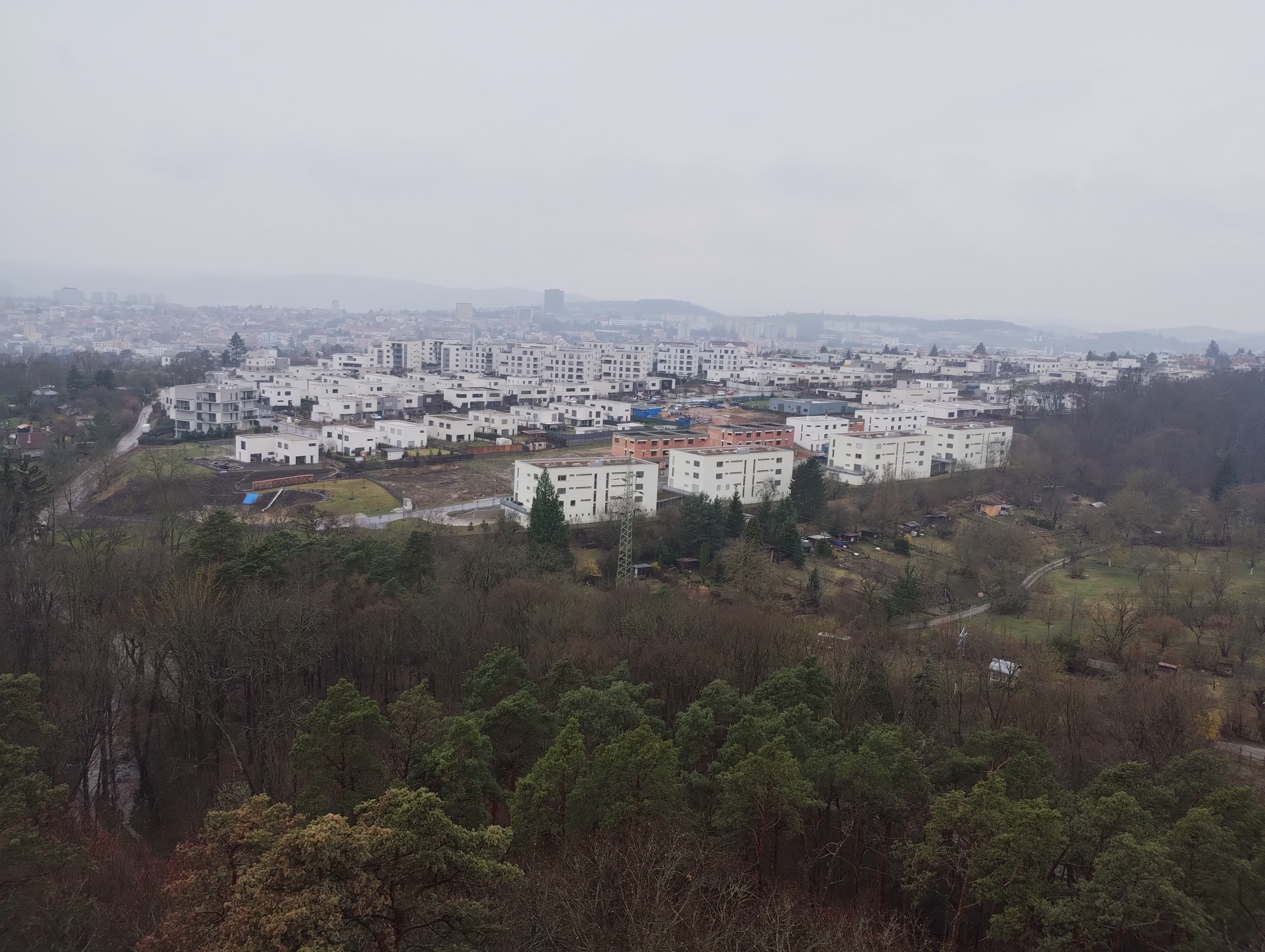
- Newer housing development in Sadová

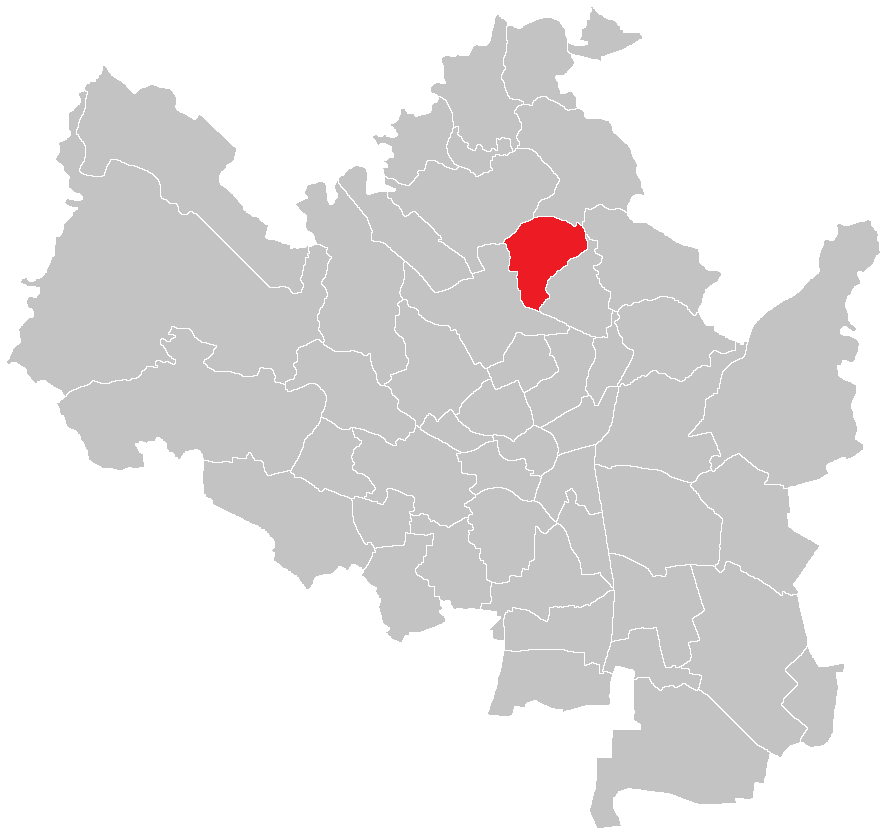
- Location of Sadová in Brno 49°13′56″N 16°36′14″E
- Country: Czech Republic
- Region: South Moravian Region
- City: Brno
- City district: Brno-Královo Pole

Area
  - Total: 2.82 km^{2} (1.09 sq mi)

Population (2021)
  - Total: 1,858
  - Density: 659/km^{2} (1,710/sq mi)
- Time zone: UTC+1 (CET)
  - Summer (DST): UTC+2 (CEST)
- Postal code: 612 00

Sadová is one of the 4 municipal parts and cadastral territories of Brno-Královo Pole, a city district of Brno, Czech Republic. It has an area of 2.82 km^{2}. The area of modern-day Sadová was annexed to Brno in 1919. Since November 24, 1990, Sadová has been part of the city district of Brno-Královo Pole. It has about 1,900 inhabitants as of 2021, four times larger than in 2011 thanks to new housting developments.

== History ==
The Sadová cadastral territory was created during the second cadastral reform of Brno carried out in 1966-1969, from the northeastern part of the original Královo Pole cadastral territory and small parts of the Obřany cadastral territories (the eastern lane of the road in Dusíková street, leading from Lesná to Soběšice) and Soběšice (parcels 952 /1, 952/2, 952/3, 952/4, 952/6, 952/7, 952/8, 952/9, 952/10, 952/11, 952/12, 952/13, 952/14, 952/15, 952/16), from that time until 1990 it was part of the then district of Brno V. Sadová previously served as a reserve for further housing development construction. After the Velvet Revolution, on November 24, 1990, it became part of the newly established city district of Brno-Královo Pole.

Due to the attractiveness of the entire location, construction of residential complexes began here in the late 2000s: in October 2008, a small complex of terraced houses, Nad Kociánkou, began to be built in Kostelní Zmola street, the completion of which was planned for September 2010; east of Kociánka street, the large residential complex Panorama Kociánka for about 600 residents began to be built in 2008, and the luxury apartment building Zaječí Hora was built in 2022 to the southeast of Sadová in Křivého Street.

== Geography ==
Within the city district of Brno-Královo Pole as well as Brno, Sadová, whose surface has significant differences in height, is exceptional in that it is dominated by the forests of Kyselé and Zaječí hory (324 m above sea level), gardens and orchards. The whole of Sadová is located on the hills between Královo Pole and Soběšice. From the southern slopes of Sadová there is a view of Královo Pole and the adjacent district. The aforementioned Zaječí hora is located approximately in the center of Sadová, around which flows the Zaječí stream in the adjacent valley, on which there are three ponds and several lakes. The valley with the stream also represents an important landscape element of the Zaječí stream. To the east of the Sadové cadastre, in the "U Antoníčka" valley, close to the border with Lesná, there is the chapel of St. Anthony and the nearby U Antoníčka well.

Sadová borders Královo Pole to the south and west, Řečkovice and Soběšice to the north, and Lesná to the east.

== Territorial divisions ==
The cadastral territory of Sadová is further divided into 4 basic settlement units.

Basic settlement unit	Population		
Basic settlement unit	2011	2021	Change
Kociánka	308	442	+43.5%
Kociánka-Hamerláky	119	1,339	+1,025.2%
Střelecký stadión	23	30	+30.4%
Zaječí hora	1	47	+4,600.0%

== Demographics ==
Historical population
Year	Pop.	±%
1970	504	—
1980	389	−22.8%
1991	347	−10.8%
2001	404	+16.4%
2011	451	+11.6%
2021	1,858	+312.0%
Source: Censuses

As of the 2021 census, the population is 1,858, up over 4 times from 451 in the 2011 census, and as such is the fastest growing cadastral territory in Brno.

== Transport ==
Public transport connections with other parts of Brno are available via the trolleybus line no. 30 (which runs on battery power in the area, meaning there are no overhead wires). During the night it is serves by the line no. N93
