= Brno-Královo Pole railway station =

Railway station in Brno, Czech Republic

Brno-Královo Pole
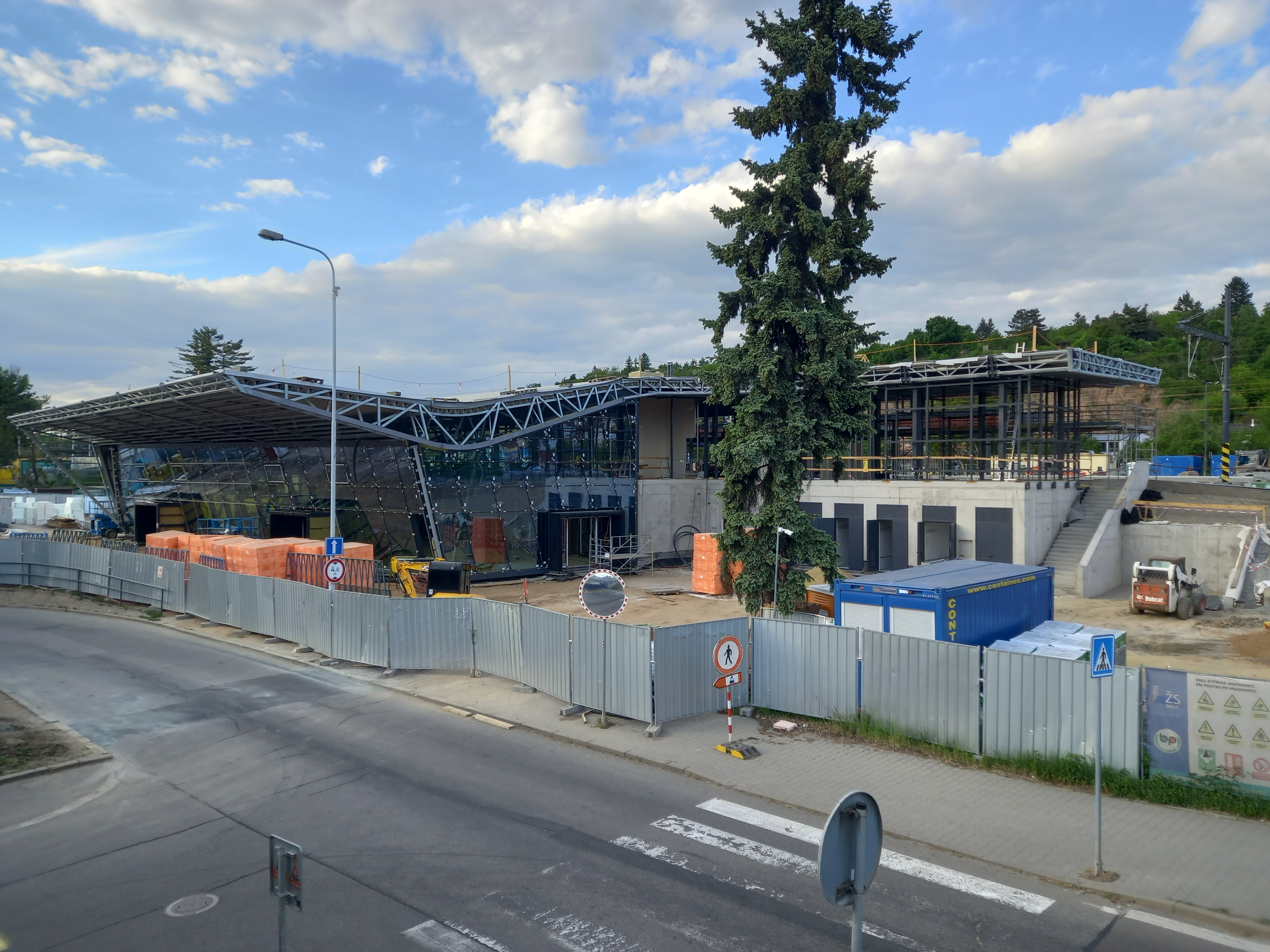
- Brno-Královo Pole station building under construction, May 2025

General information
- Location: Czech Republic
- Coordinates: 49°13′51″N 16°35′49″E
- Elevation: 225
- Line: Brno–Havlíčkův Brod
- Platforms: 3
- Tracks: 9
- Connections: trams, trolleybuses, buses

History
- Opened: 1952
- Electrified: 1952
Location

Brno-Královo Pole is a railway station in Královo Pole district of Brno in the Czech Republic. It lies on the line Brno–Havlíčkův Brod.

== History ==
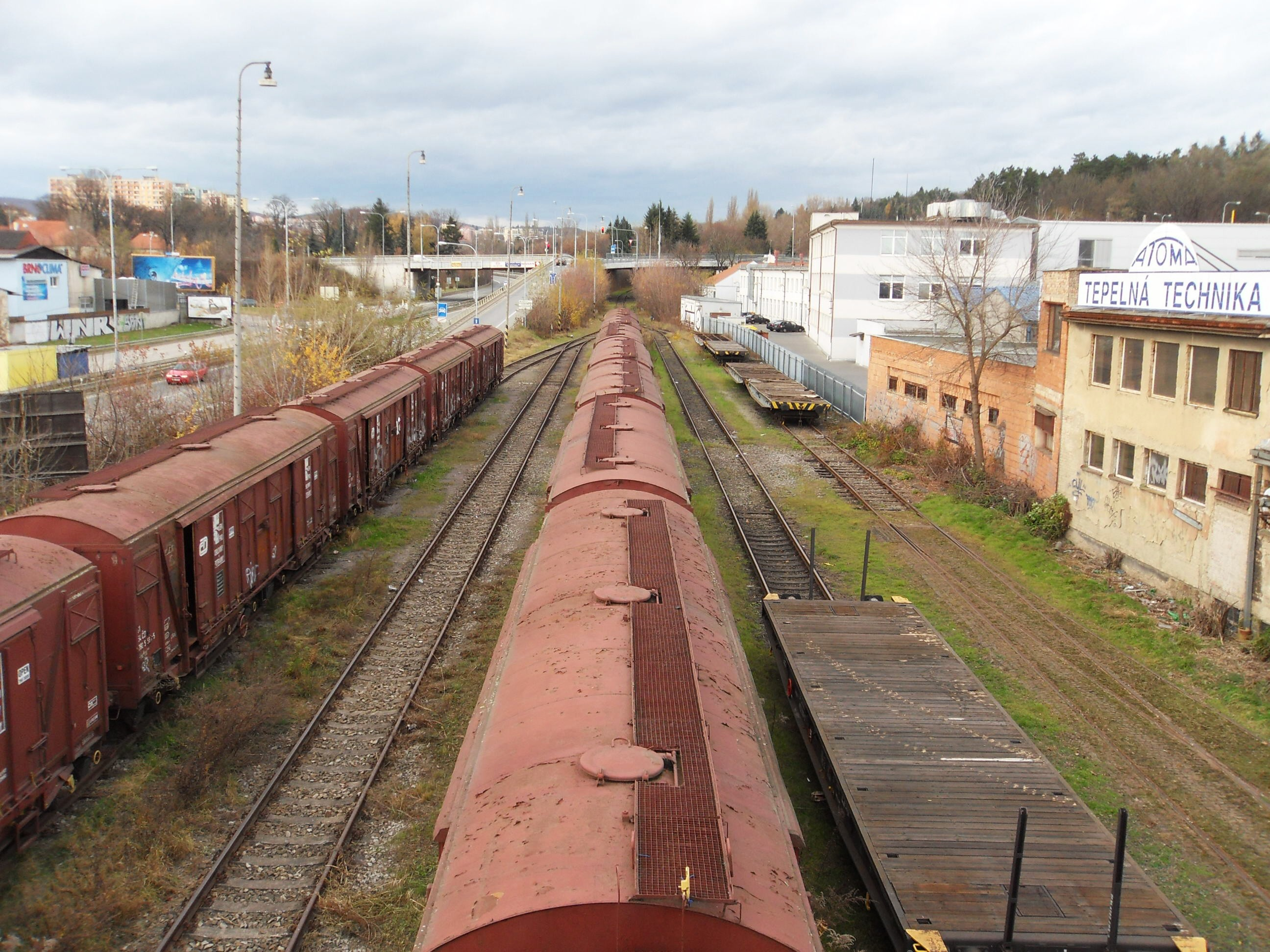
Tracks at the old Královo Pole station

The original Královo Pole station was located near current Sportovní street, about 700 m to the south-east. I was opened in 1885 as a part of Brno-Tišnov line.

In 1938, construction of a new fast train line between Brno and Havlíčkův Brod started. Its operation started on 20 December 1953 and a new station on it, was opened in 1952.

The station building and other parts of the original station were demolished in the second half of the 1980s, during the construction of the Svitavy radial road, running near the tracks.

In 1954, a new passenger hall was opened at the new station. In the 1980, an elevated road called Svitavy radial road was built in front of the station.

In 2010, a completely new station building was drafted.

Správa železnic has been preparing a modernization of the station building and replacing the old one by a new, two-flor.

As a part of reconstruction, tracks are planned to be repaired, an underpass in direction to Myslínova street should be built, and the 1st track between Brno-Maloměřice–Kuřim should be renewed.

The reconstruction was ceremonially started in December 2023.

In May 2024, station buildings were demolished.

== City transport terminal ==
Near this station, in Budovcova street, there is a city transport terminal, served by trams (line 6), trolleybuses (line 30), and buses (both city and regional). It was opened in 1997.

== Gallery ==
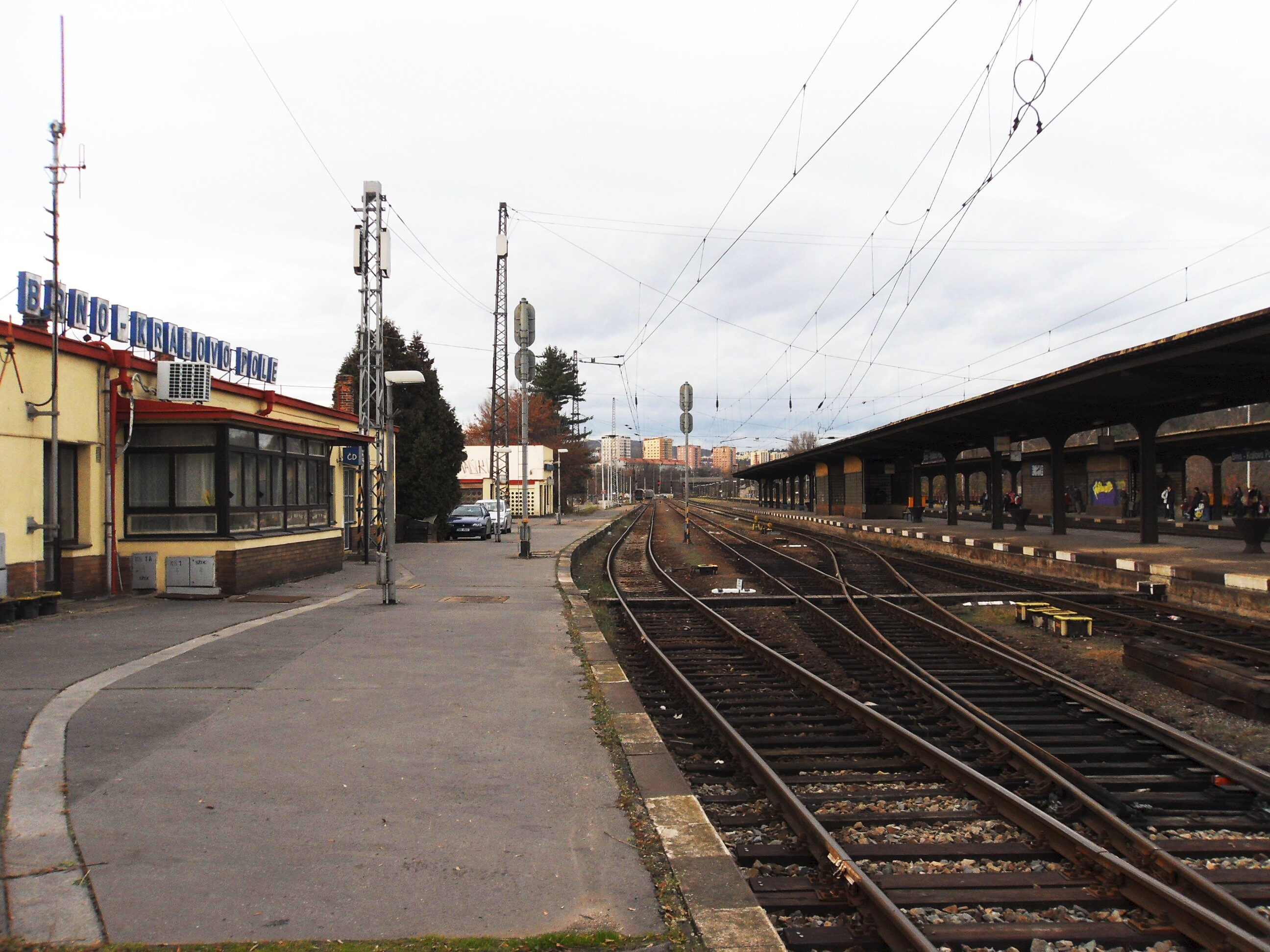
View from platform 1

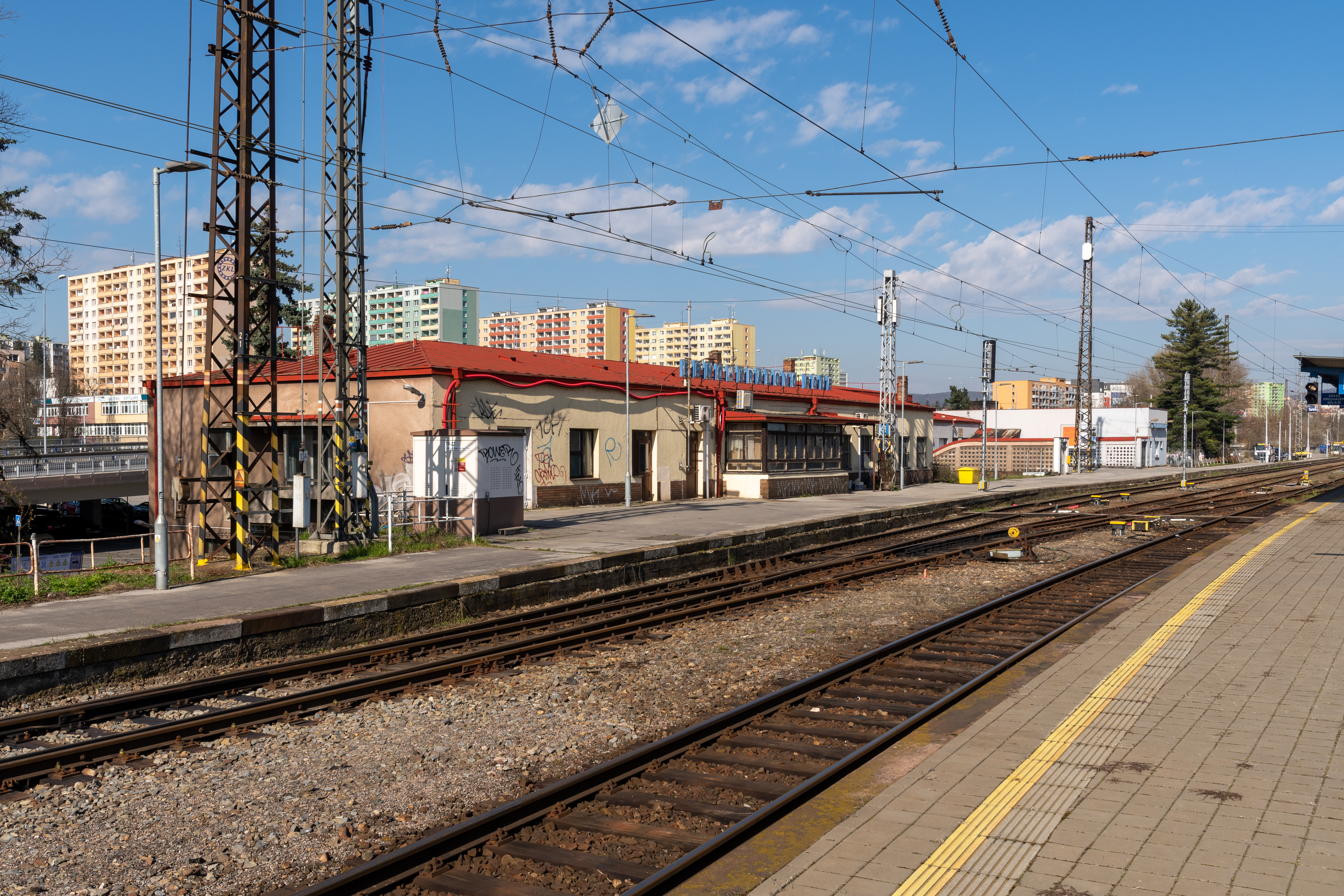
Station building before the start of modernization

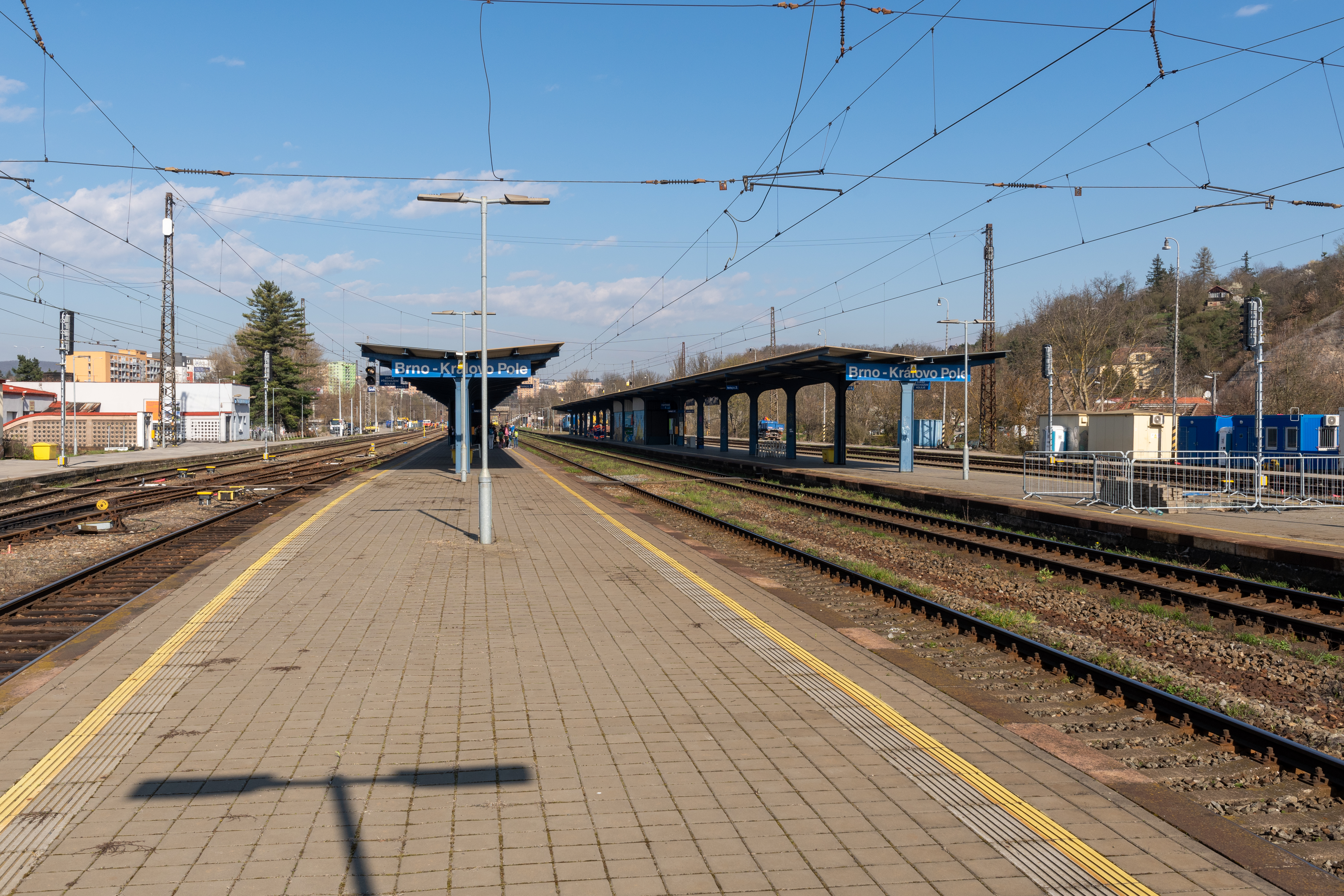
Platforms 2 and 3

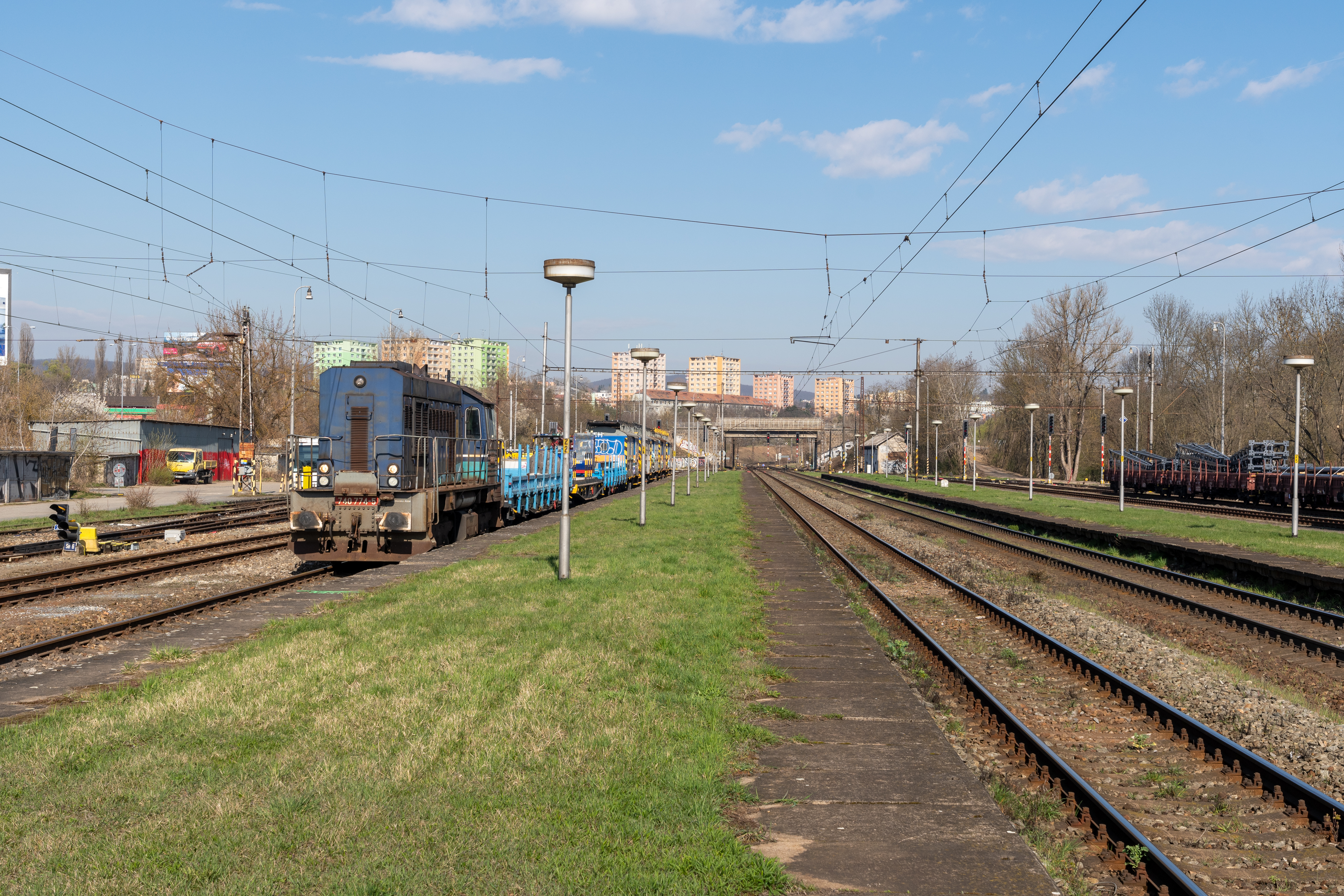
View form platform 2 in direction to Kuřim

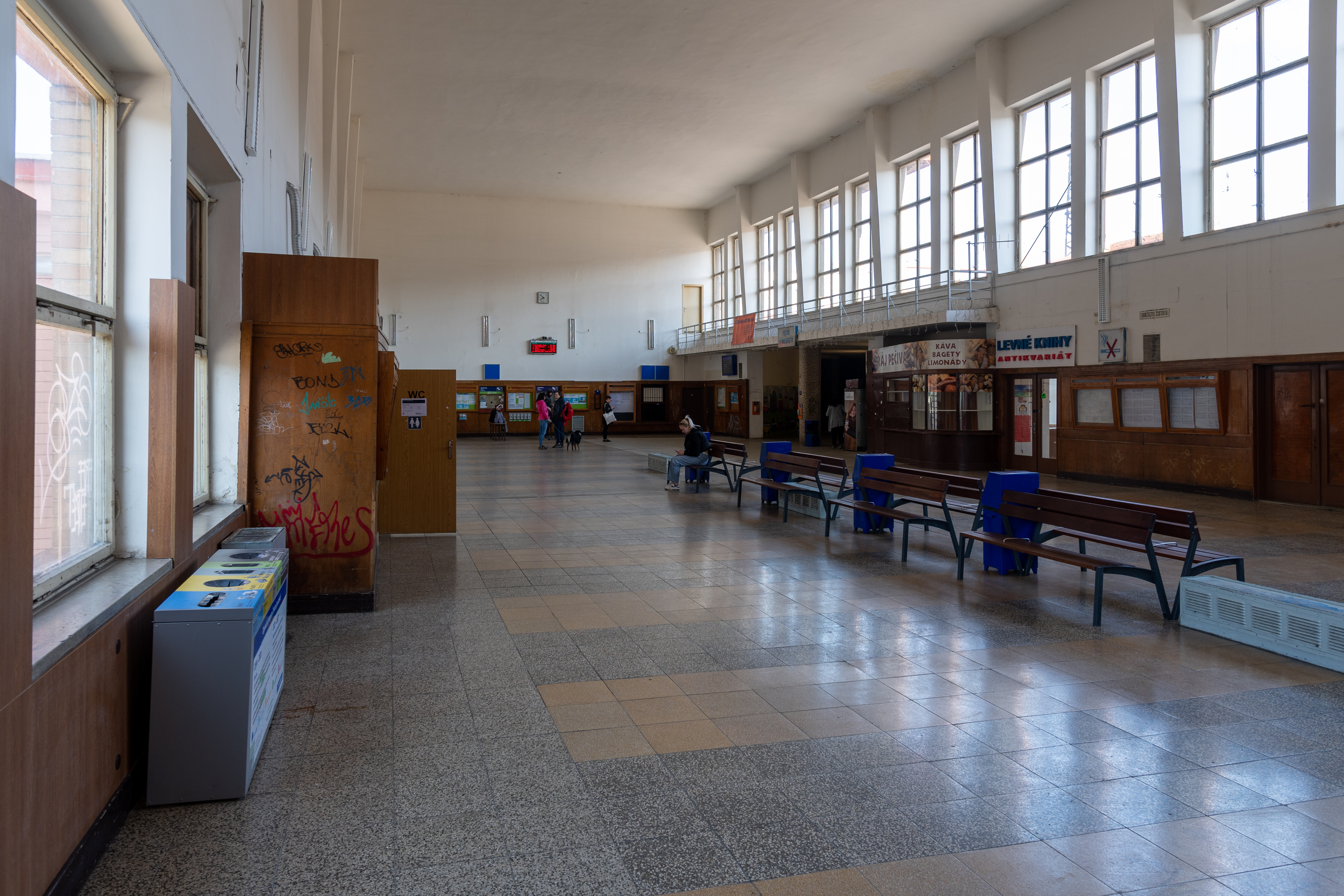
Inner part of passenger hall

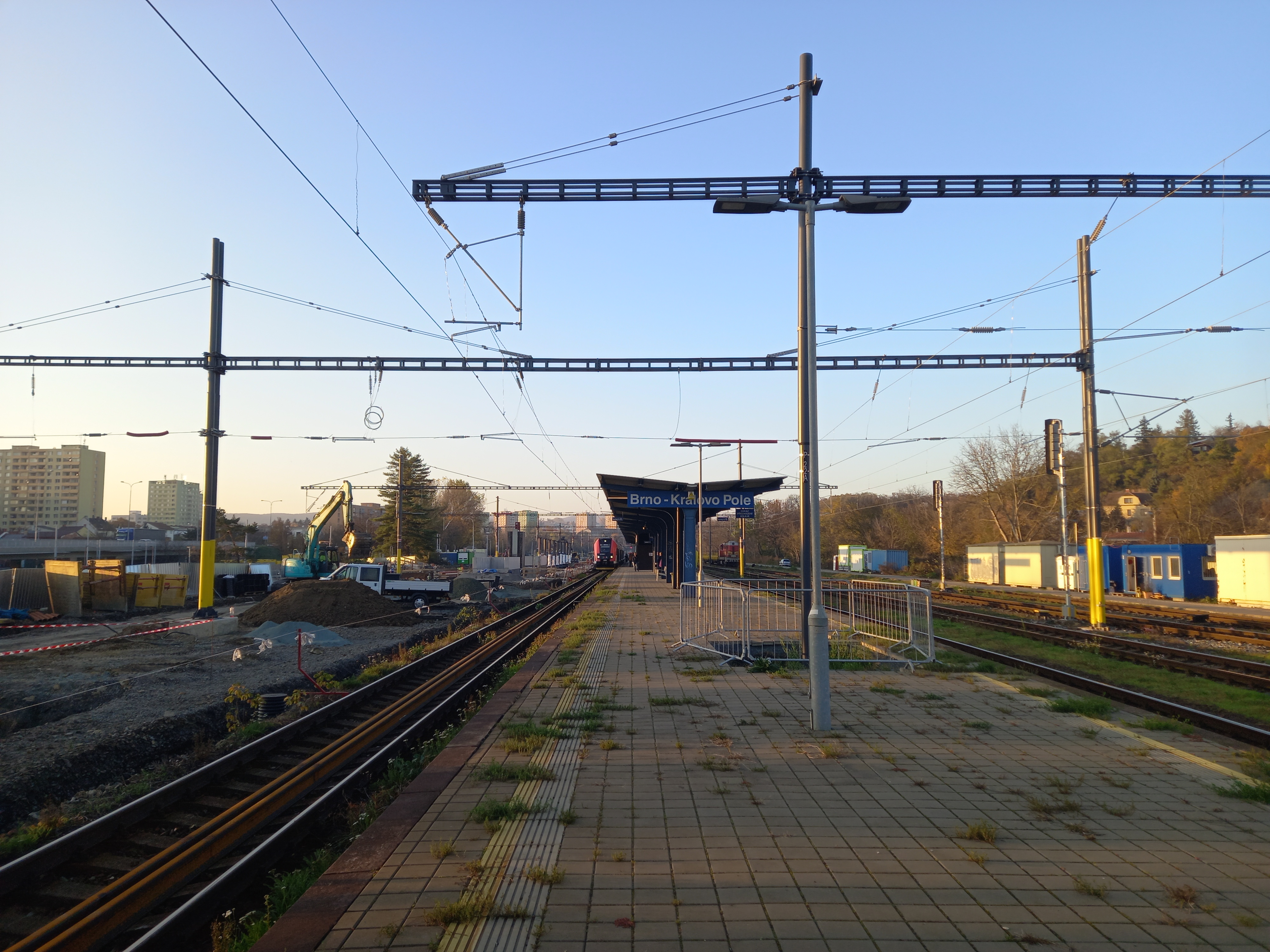
Reconstruction in November 2024

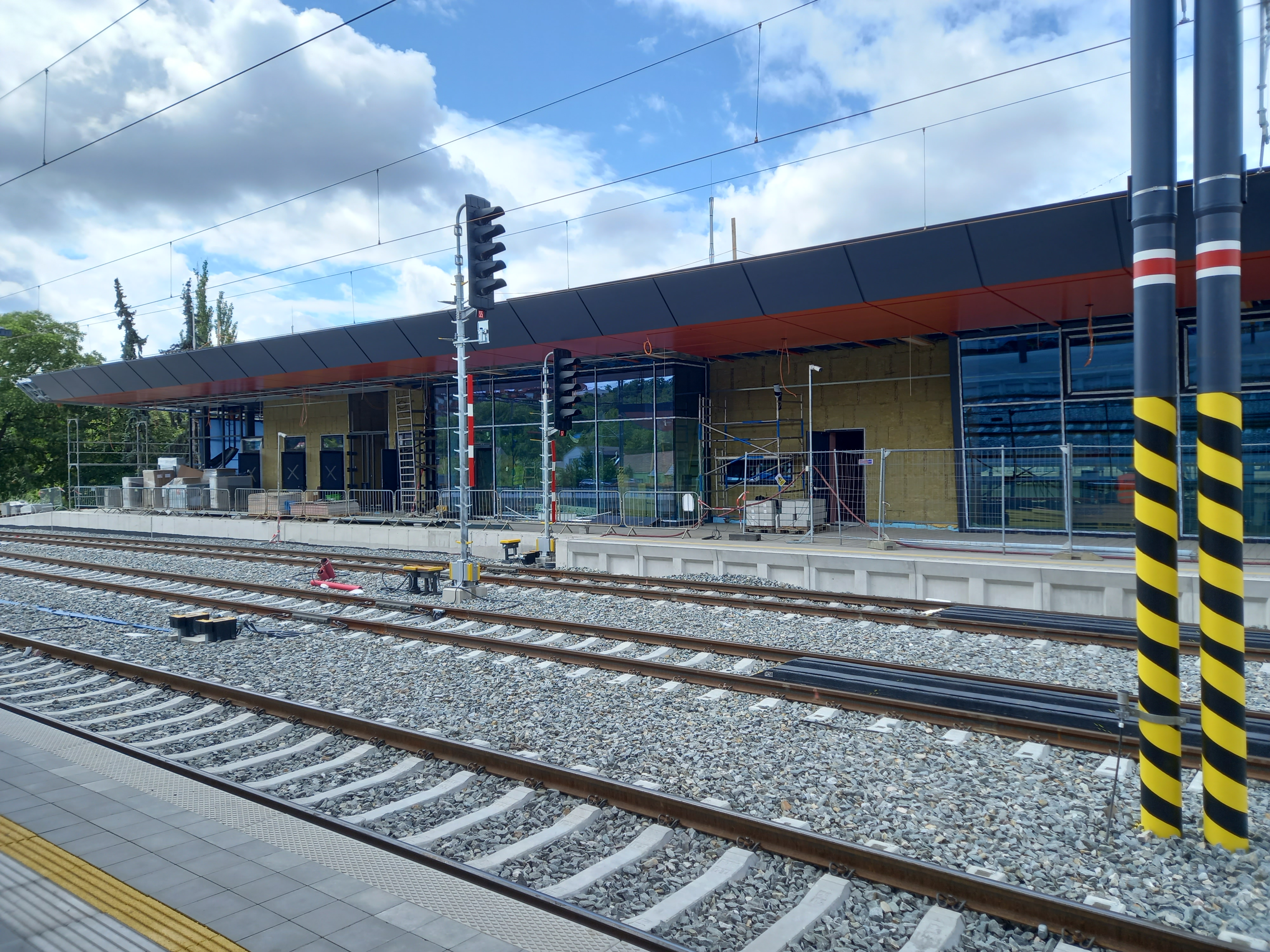
Reconstruction in July 2025, view from Platform 2 towards the station building

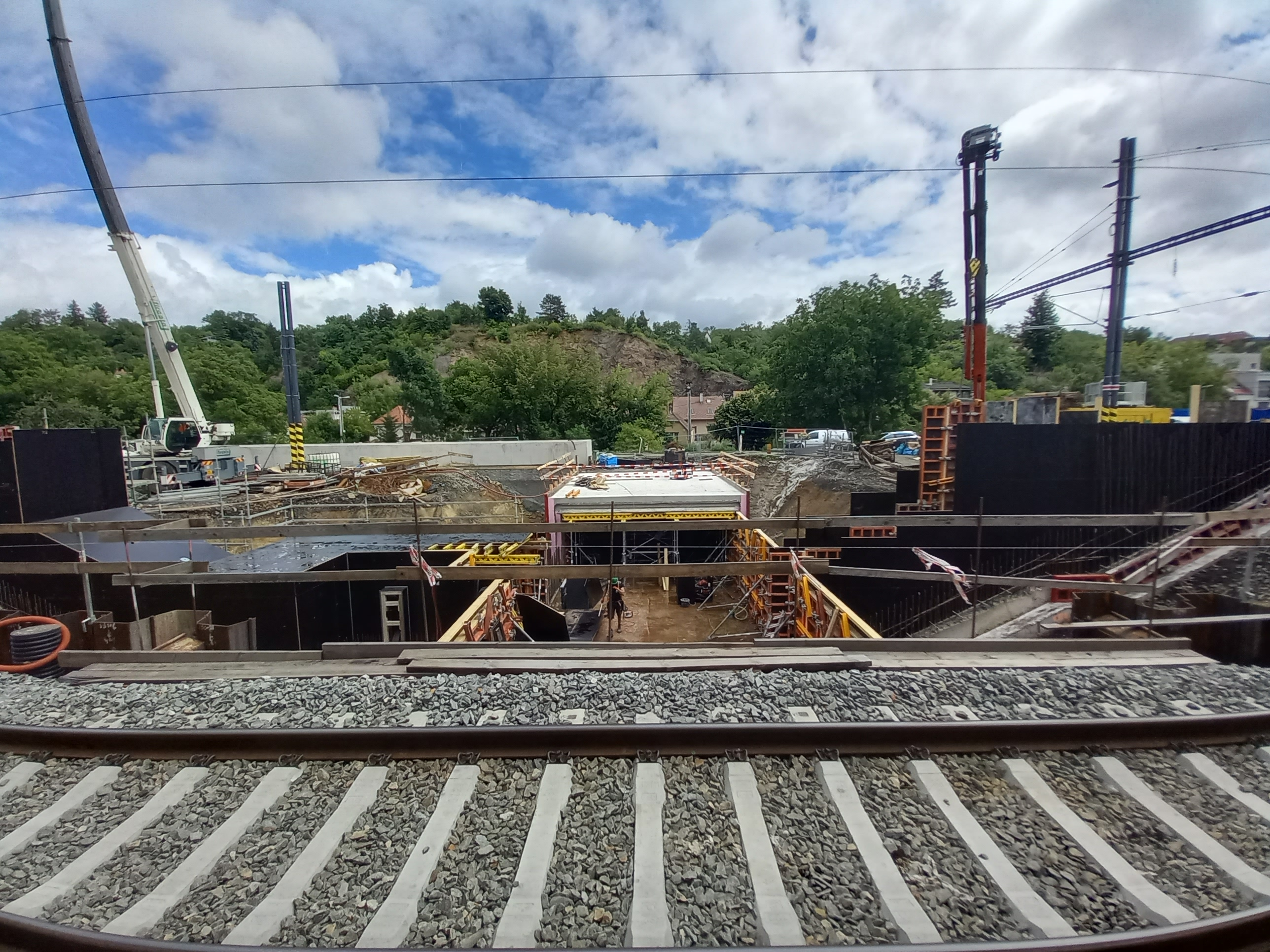
Building the underpass in July 2025

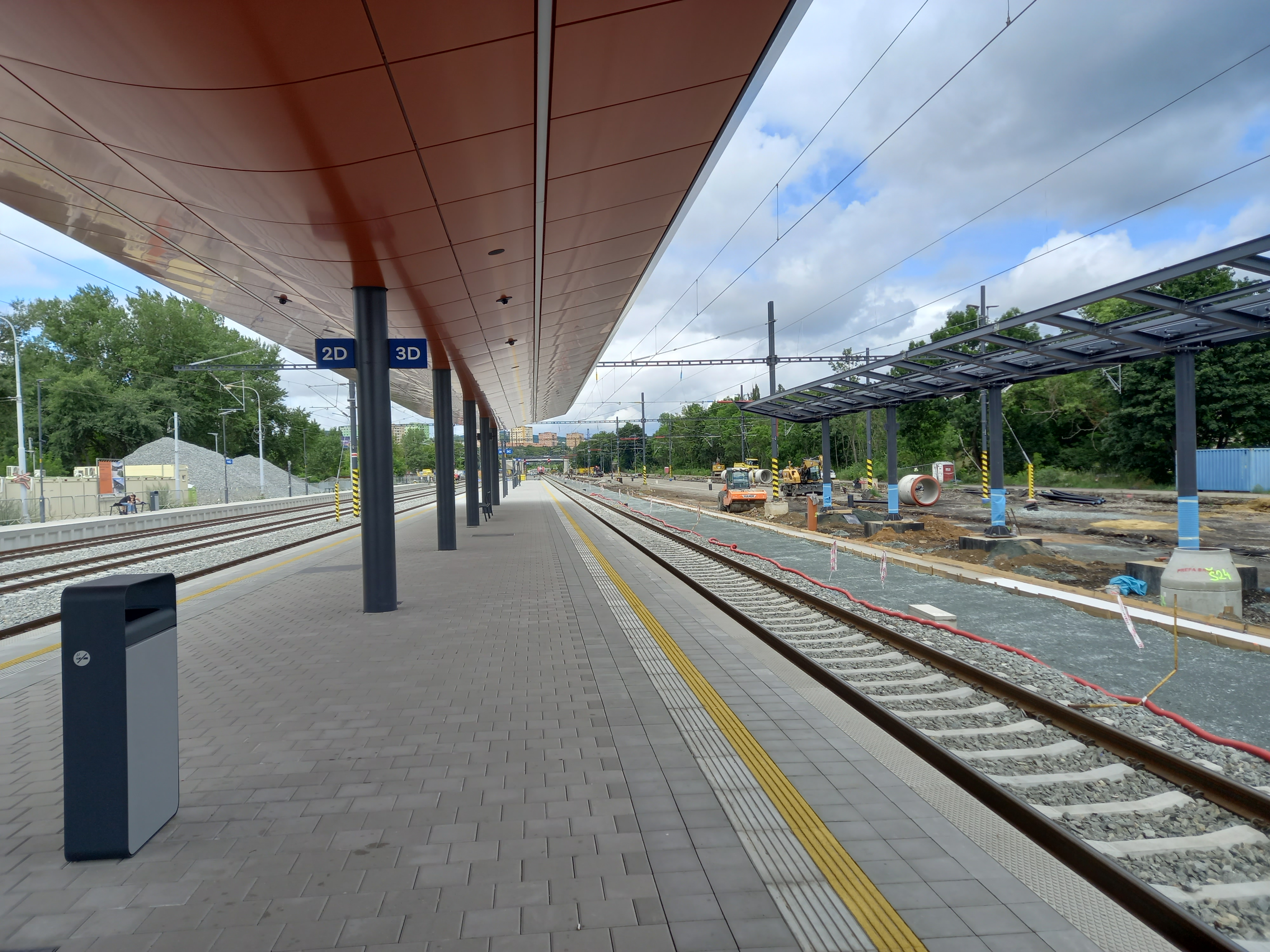
View of Platform 2 and Platform 3 in July 2025

== Services ==
Preceding station	České dráhy	Following station
Brno-Řečkovice or Česká	Stopping trains	Brno-Lesná or terminus toward Židlochovice, Hustopeče u Brna or terminus
Brno-Lesná	Stopping trains	Česká toward Tišnov or Křižanov
Kuřim	Regional fast trains	Brno-Lesná toward Brno hl.n.
Tišnov or Kuřim	Fast trains	Brno hl.n. toward Brno hl.n.
Brno hl.n.	Fast trains	Kuřim or Tišnov toward Havlíčkův Brod, Praha hl.n., or Praha-Vršovice
