= Královo Pole =

- Cadastral territory of Brno
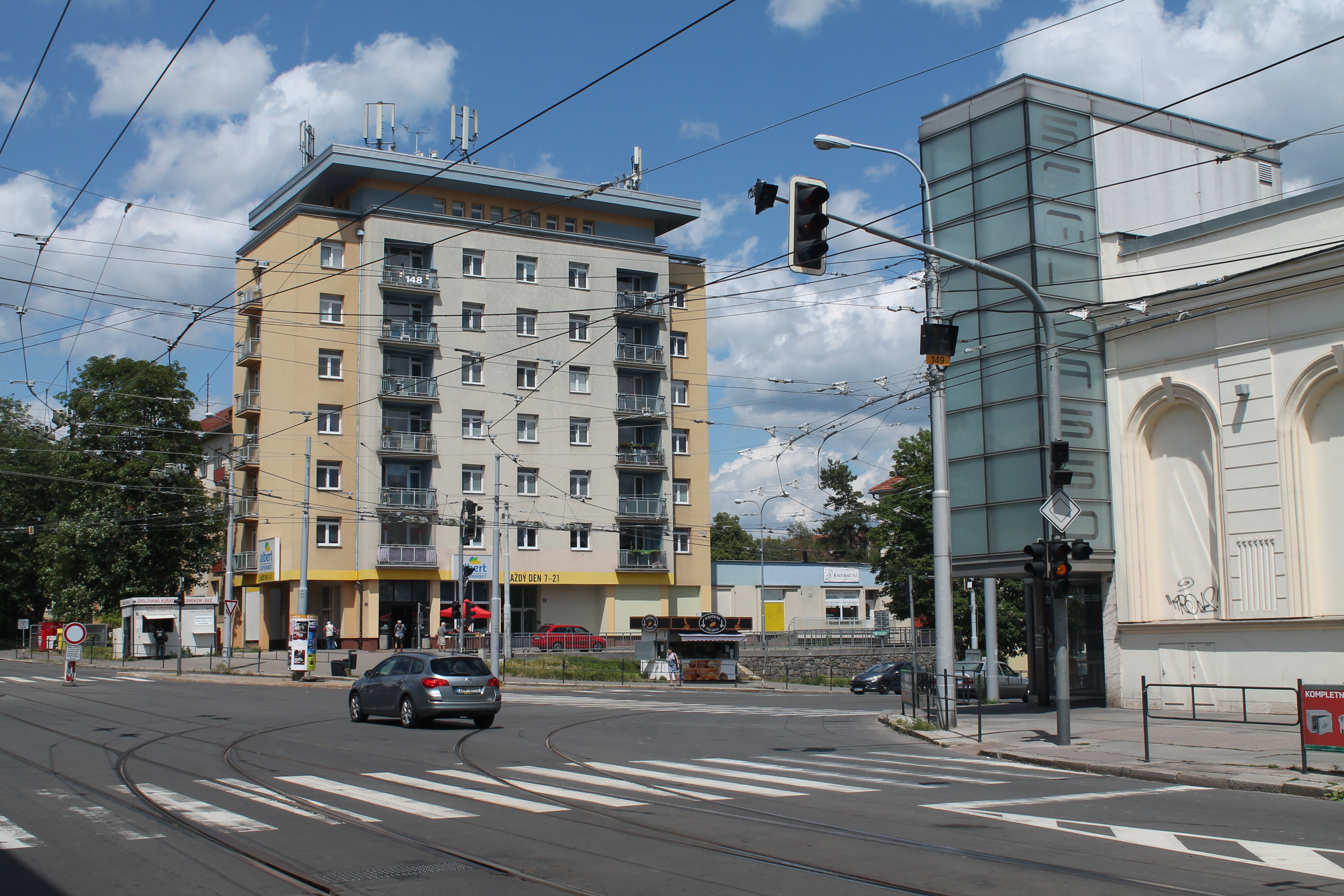
- Palackého třída street

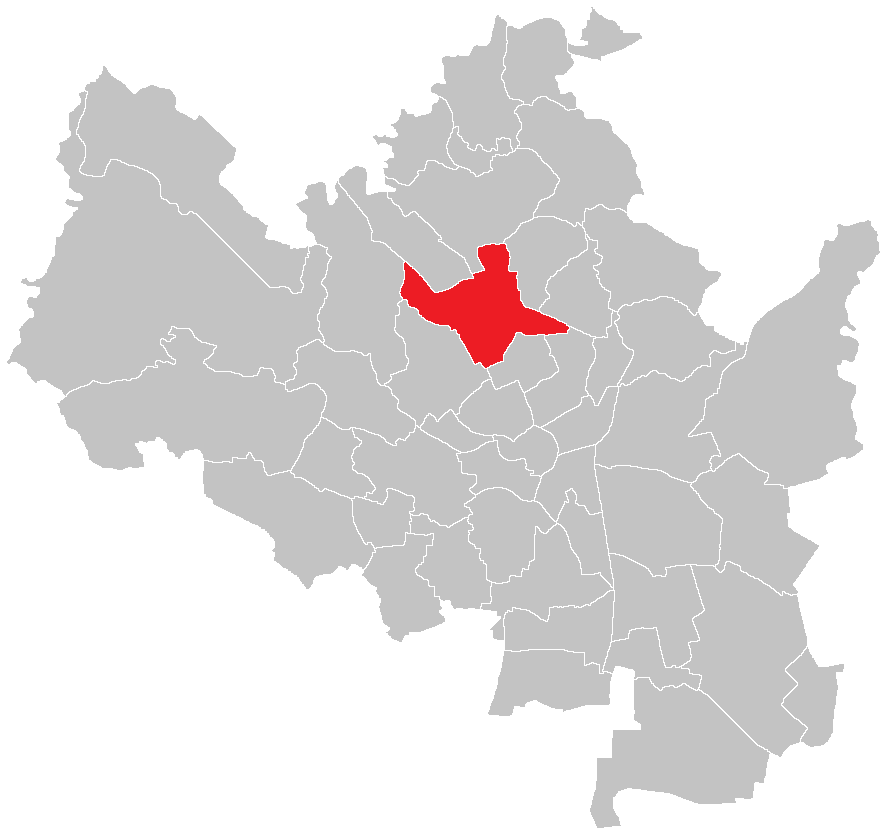
- Location of Královo Pole in Brno 49°13′25″N 16°35′40″E
- Country: Czech Republic
- Region: South Moravian Region
- District: Brno-City
- City: Brno
- City district: Brno-Královo Pole
- Established: 1969

Area
  - Total: 5.50 km^{2} (2.12 sq mi)

Population (2021)
  - Total: 21,119
  - Density: 3,840/km^{2} (9,950/sq mi)
- Time zone: UTC+1 (CET)
  - Summer (DST): UTC+2 (CEST)
- Postal code: 612 00
- Website: www.kralovopole.brno.cz

Královo Pole (German: Königsfeld, in English meaning "King's Field") is one of the 4 municipal parts and cadastral territories of Brno-Královo Pole, a city district of Brno, Czech Republic, north from the city center. It has about 21,000 inhabitants.

== History ==
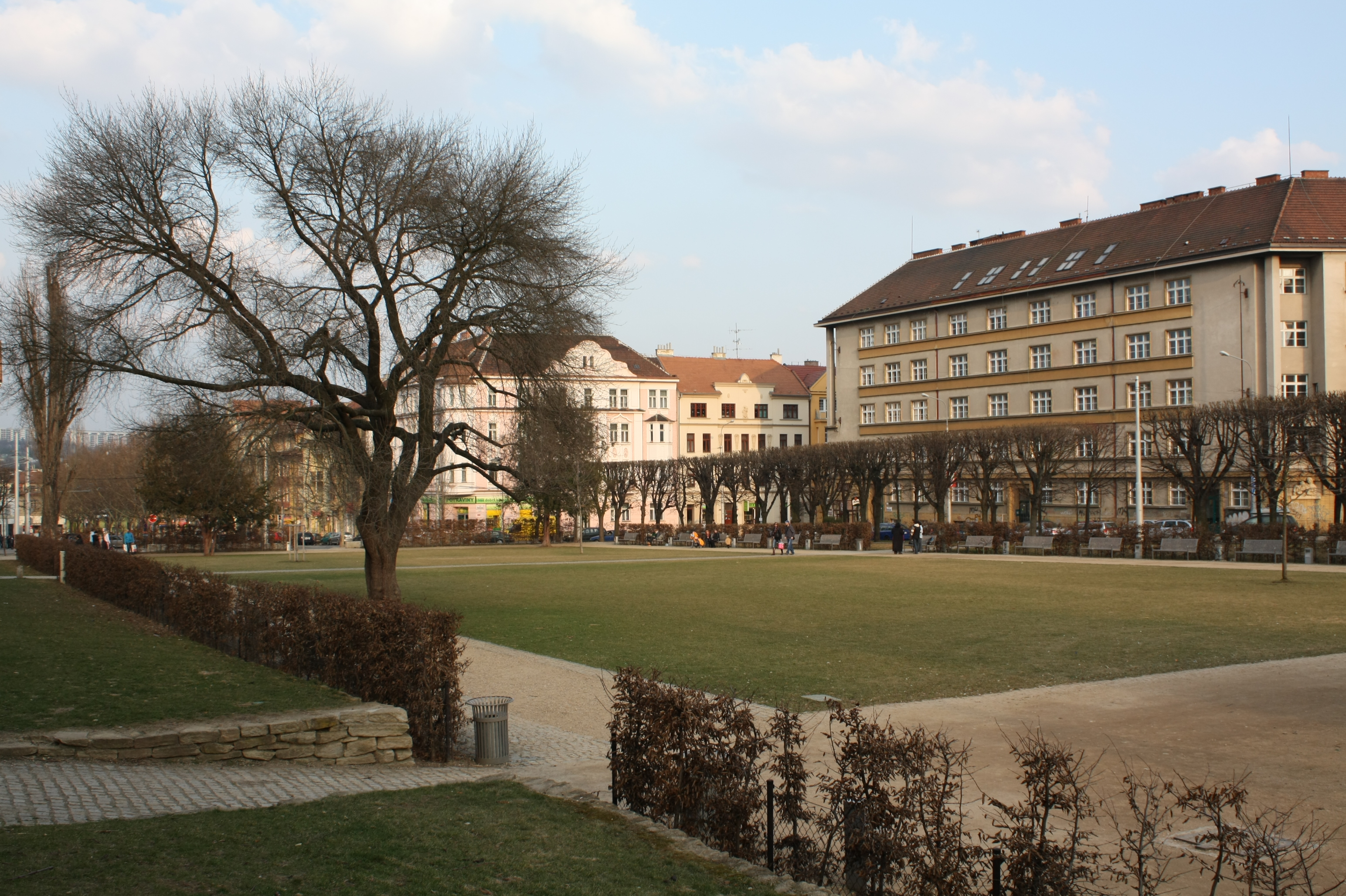
Slovanské náměstí (lit. 'Slav Square')

The first written record of Královo Pole comes from 1240, as a village (or literally a field) belonging to the king. A Carthusian monastery was established here in late 14th century.

Rapid development took place during the second half of the 19th century. It was started by the building of a sugar mill, followed by other industries, especially the Královopolská machine works. In 1885, Královo Pole was connected to the railway. In 1905 the settlement became a town (city). Soon after the World War I it became a part of Brno. While the oldest part of Královo Pole down at the Ponávka brook retained its village look, the newly built-up area on a slope ascending westwards developed a cohesive urbanistic structure centered in the Slovanské náměstí ("The Slavic Square"), with Art Nouveau city blocks and functionalistic family houses.

After World War II there was another development, housing estates were built south and later also north around. The railway with the station were relocated and some adjacent streets and blocks were rearranged.

== Geography ==
Královo Pole borders the cadastral territories of Medlánky and Řečkovice to the north, Sadová and Lesná to the northeast, Černá Pole to the southeast, Ponava to the south, and Žabovřesky and Komín to the west.

=== Territorial divisions ===
The cadastral territory of Královo Pole is further divided into 11 basic settlement units.

Basic settlement unit	Population		
Basic settlement unit	2011	2021	Change
Vysoká škola veterinární	1,602	1,536	-4.1%
Vackova	4,354	4,337	-0.4%
Poděbradova	1,674	1,928	+15.2%
Berkova	3,383	3,330	-1.6%
Mojmírovo náměstí	790	1,198	+51.6%
Křižíkova	171	89	-48.0%
Pod pražskou tratí	81	42	-48.2%
Pod Palackého vrchem	1,333	980	-26.5%
Herčíkova	2,236	2,083	-6.8%
Palackého	4,737	4,645	-1.9%
Myslínova	932	951	+2.0%

== Demographics ==
Historical population

Year	Pop.	±%
1869	3,361	—
1880	4,427	+31.7%
1890	6,688	+51.1%
1900	10,288	+53.8%
1910	13,078	+27.1%

Year	Pop.	±%
1921	15,179	+16.1%
1930	20,667	+36.2%
1950	22,847	+10.5%
1961	28,175	+23.3%
1970	22,377	−20.6%

Year	Pop.	±%
1980	25,192	+12.6%
1991	21,030	−16.5%
2001	20,205	−3.9%
2011	21,293	+5.4%
2021	21,119	−0.8%

The population decrease between 1961-1970 was due to border changes in 1969.
Source: Censuses

== Notable places ==
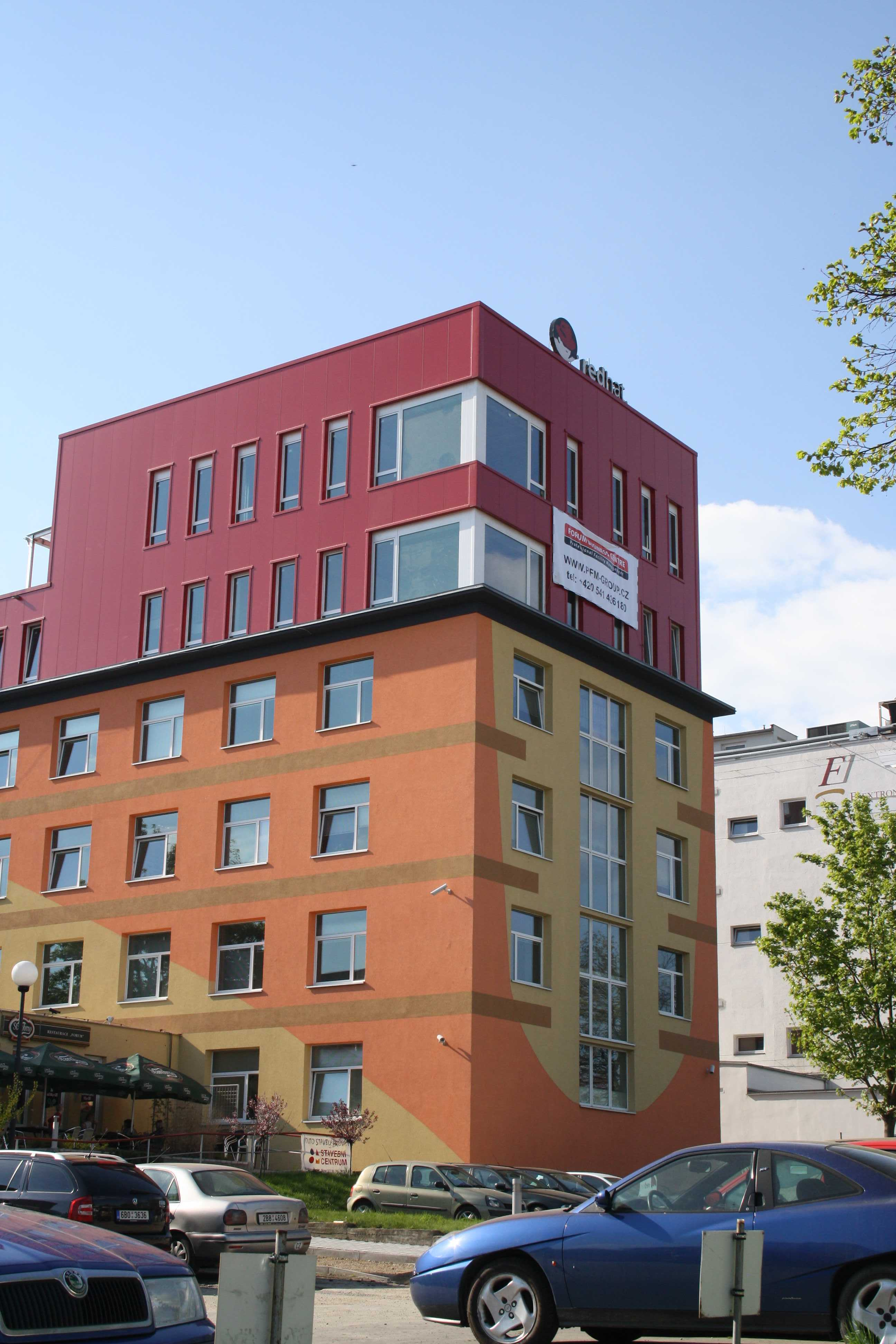
Redhat building in Brno, Královo Pole

- Old monastery of Carthusians – today belongs to and has been reconstructed by the Faculty of Information Technology, University of Technology Brno.
- IT park of the city and several university grounds.
- IBM's office in the Czech Republic.
- Red Hat's office in Czechoslovakia.

== Transport ==
Královo Pole is connected with the Brno centre by several tram lines and one trolleybus line. Another trolleybus line provides a tangential connection with city districts in the west. The Brno-Královo Pole railway station is served by local passenger trains and fast trains Brno-Prague (via Havlíčkův Brod). A bus terminal is located in front of the station, with bus lines to the northern outskirts of Brno. The Brno outer ring road is tunneled west–east under the district and at the tunnel portals it crosses radial highways leading to Svitavy.

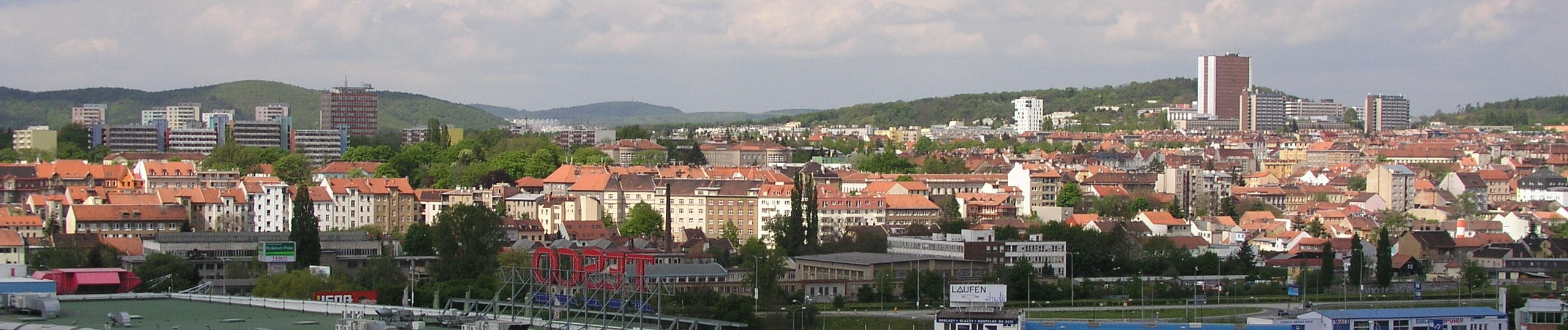
Eastern view of Královo Pole
