= Lužánky =

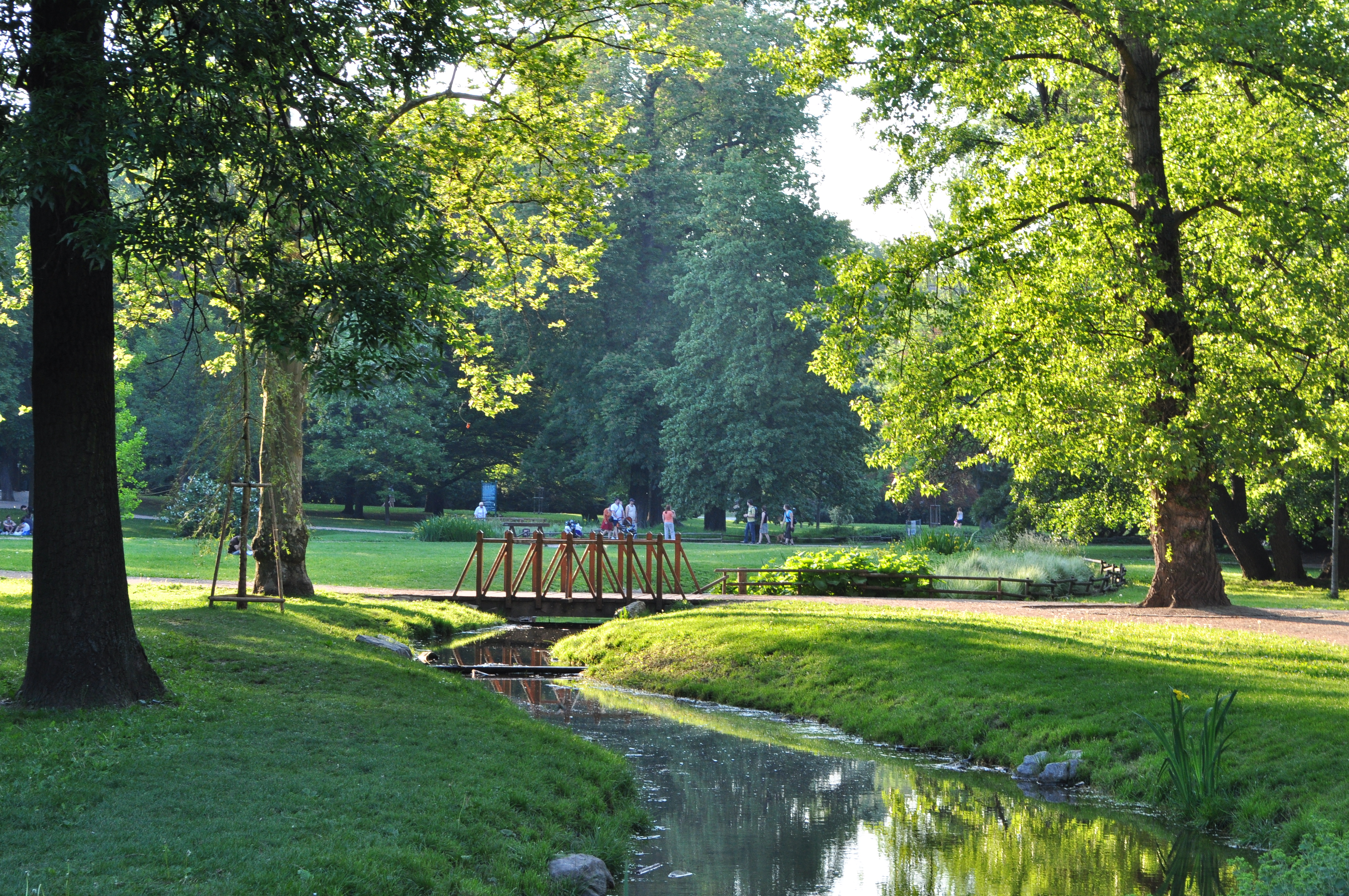
- Artificial stream in Lužánky park
- Interactive map of Lužánky
- Type: Public city park
- Location: Brno, Czech Republic
- Coordinates: 49°12′23″N 16°36′30″E
- Area: 22.3 ha (55 acres)
- Created: 1786 (current form in 1840)
- Designer: Antonín Šebánek
- Status: Open year round

Lužánky (German: Augarten) is the largest city park in Brno and the oldest municipal park in the Czech Republic. The park is located in the Brno-střed District and covers an area of 22.3 hectares (55 acres).

== History ==
The oldest mention of Lužánky comes from the 13th century, when a burgess from Brno called Niger donated his meadow to the Herburský Monastery. During the 16th century, Jesuits took over the site and established an ornamental garden, mainly used for spiritual exercises and meditation.

In 1786, during the rule of Emperor Joseph II, the Jesuit monastery was abolished and the land was donated to the city of Brno to create the new municipal park, one of the first in Central Europe and the first ever built in the Czech lands. In 1792, early fireworks were set off here. The current appearance of the park was designed by gardener Antonín Šebánek in 1840.

Since 1958, Lužánky has been protected as a cultural monument.

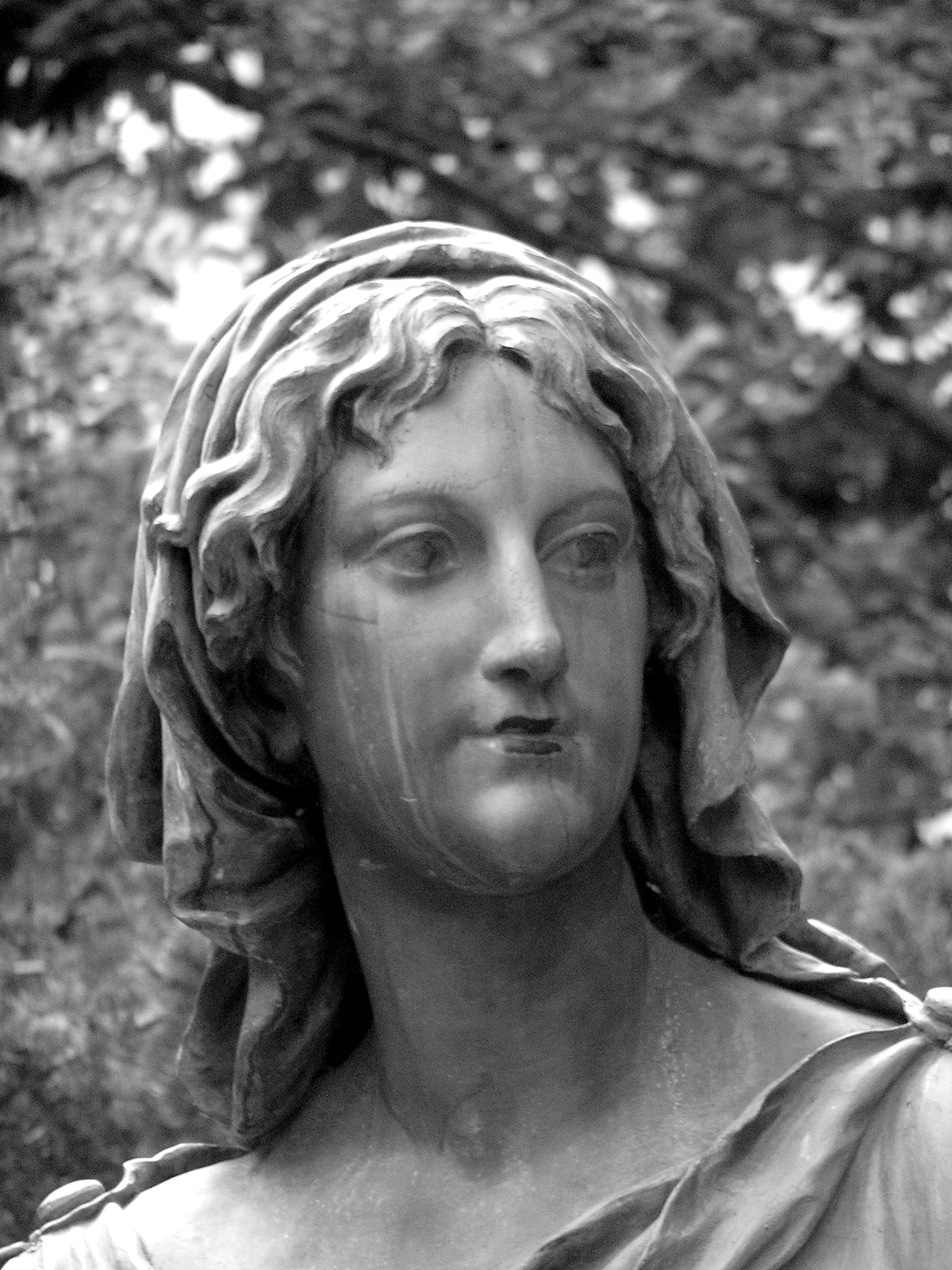
"Personification of Tolerance", a statue displayed in Lužánky. Part of a larger display honoring Emperor Joseph II that was dismantled by Czech nationalists following their independence, as it was considered a symbol of German culture.

== Facilities ==
In the year 1885, a pavilion, designed by Viennese architect Ludwig Förster in a Renaissance Revival style, was built in the park for the purpose of hosting balls, concerts and parties.

The park contains many fountains, sculptures and statues. The most significant present monument commemorates the founder of Lužánky, Emperor Joseph II.

At the southeastern corner of the park are tennis and volleyball courts available for visitors.
