= Soběšice =

- Municipality
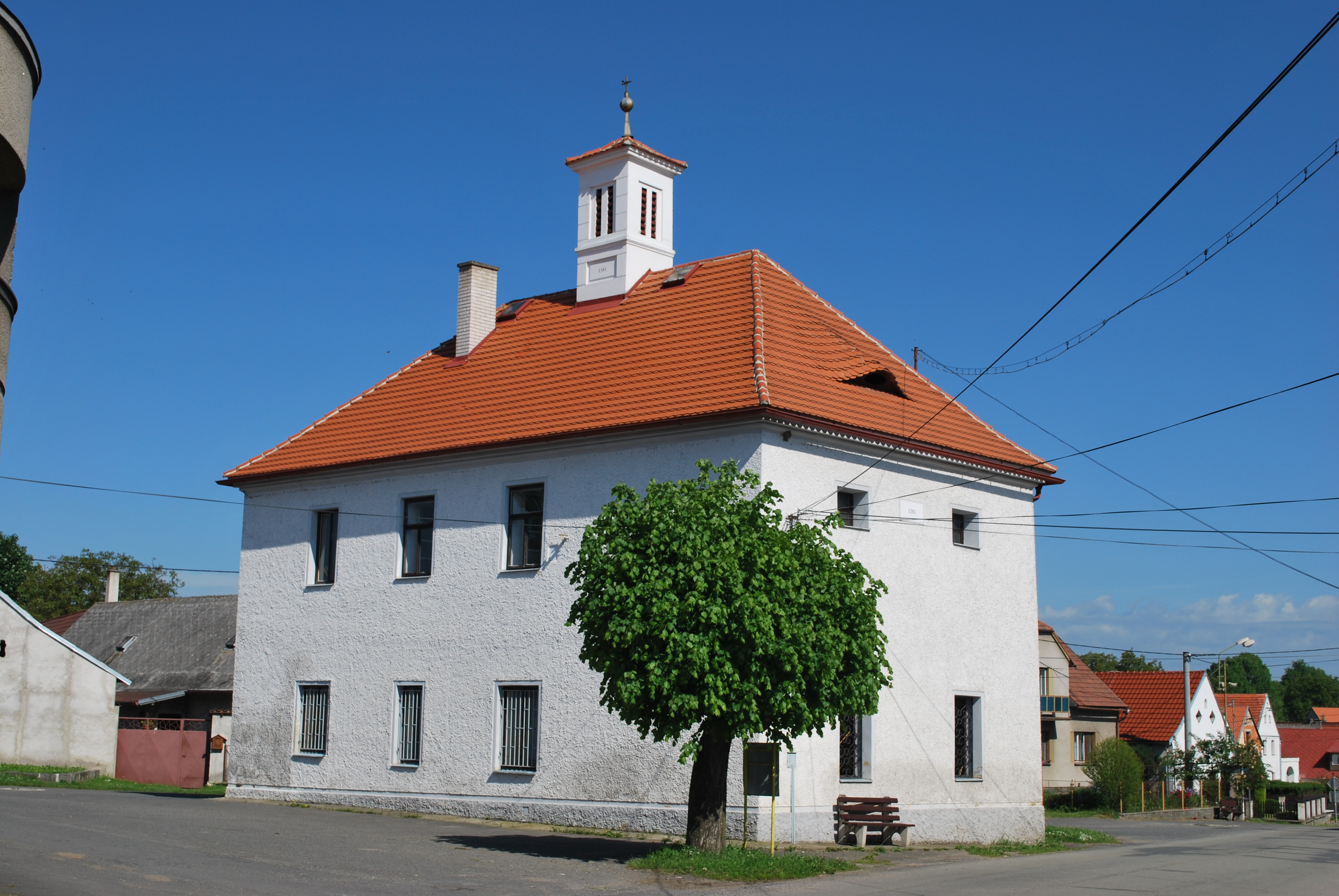
- Centre of Soběšice

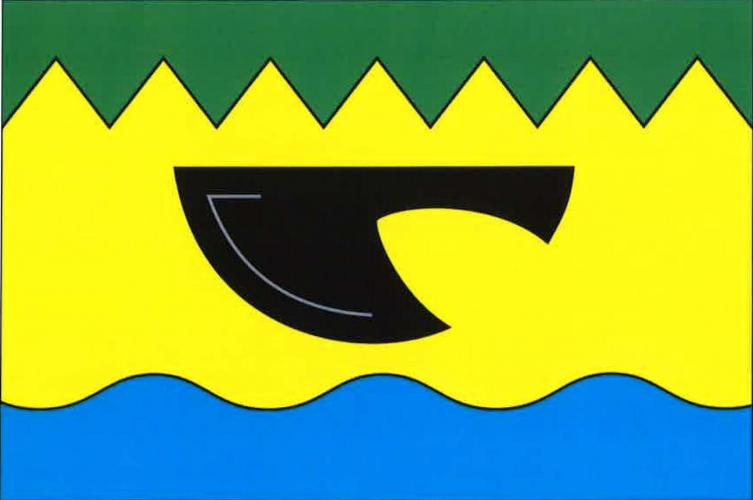
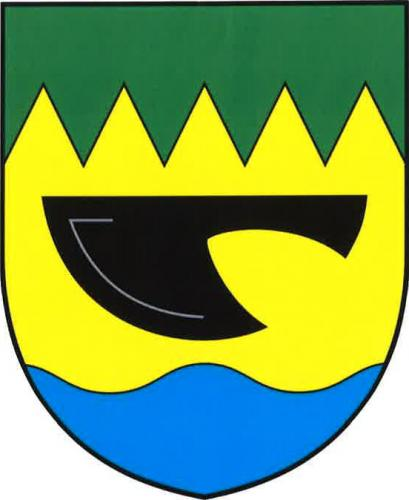
- Flag Coat of arms

- Location in the Czech Republic
- Coordinates: 49°12′28″N 13°41′3″E
- Country: Czech Republic
- Region: Plzeň
- District: Klatovy
- First mentioned: 1381

Area
  - Total: 17.14 km^{2} (6.62 sq mi)
- Elevation: 652 m (2,139 ft)

Population (2026-01-01)
  - Total: 378
  - Density: 22.1/km^{2} (57.1/sq mi)
- Time zone: UTC+1 (CET)
  - Summer (DST): UTC+2 (CEST)
- Postal code: 342 01
- Website: www.sobesice.cz

Soběšice is a municipality and village in Klatovy District in the Plzeň Region of the Czech Republic. It has about 400 inhabitants.

Soběšice lies approximately 37 kilometres (23 mi) south-east of Klatovy, 65 km (40 mi) south of Plzeň, and 112 km (70 mi) south-west of Prague.

== Administrative division ==
Soběšice consists of three municipal parts (in brackets population according to the 2021 census):

- Soběšice (309)
- Damíč (31)
- Mačice (53)

== Demographics ==
Historical population
Year	Pop.	±%
1869	1,420	—
1880	1,520	+7.0%
1890	1,518	−0.1%
1900	1,516	−0.1%
1910	1,534	+1.2%
1921	1,465	−4.5%
1930	1,200	−18.1%
1950	919	−23.4%
1961	896	−2.5%
1970	739	−17.5%
1980	611	−17.3%
1991	459	−24.9%
2001	393	−14.4%
2011	392	−0.3%
2021	393	+0.3%
Source: Censuses
