= Husovice =

- Cadastral territory of Brno
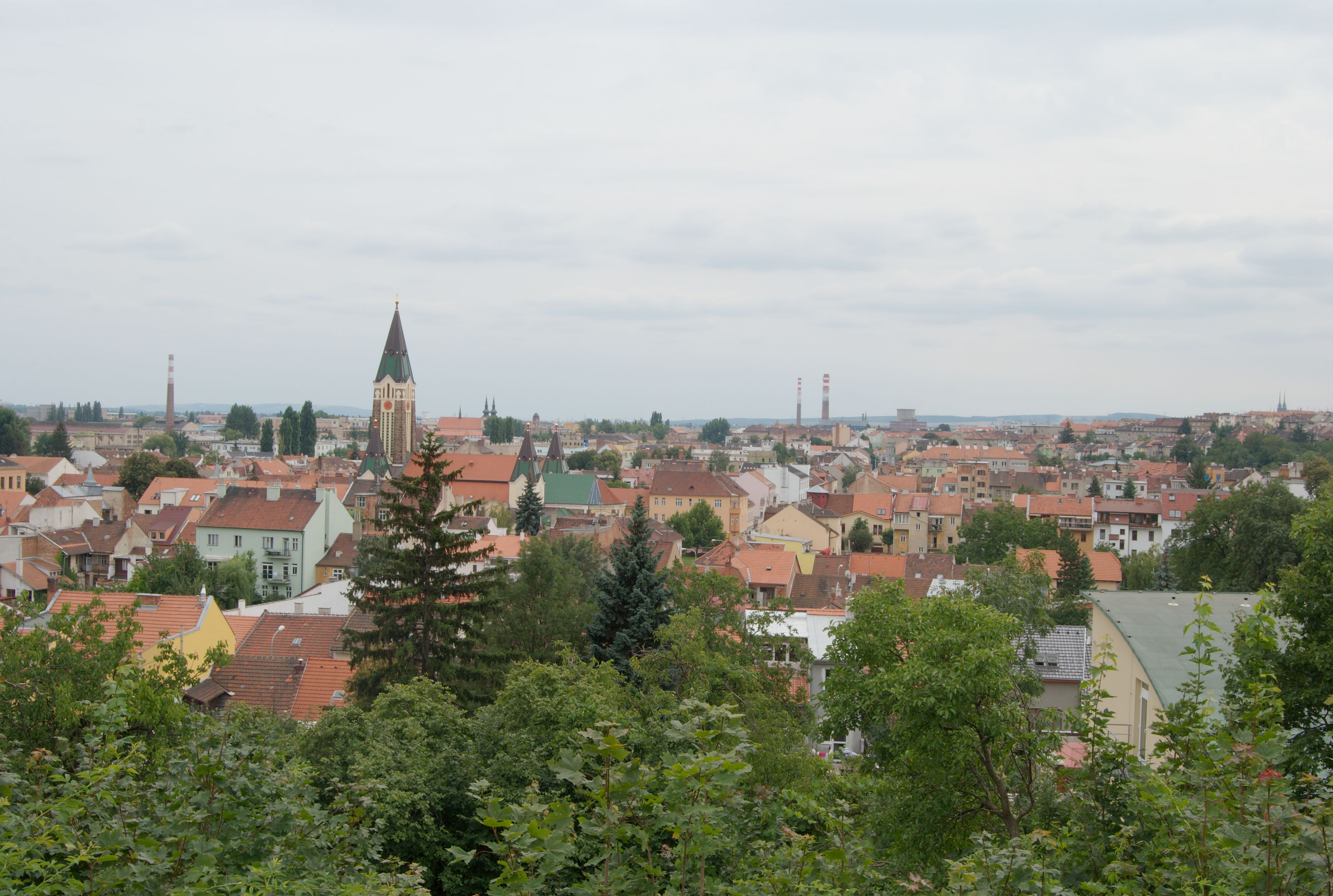
- Southern part of Husovice

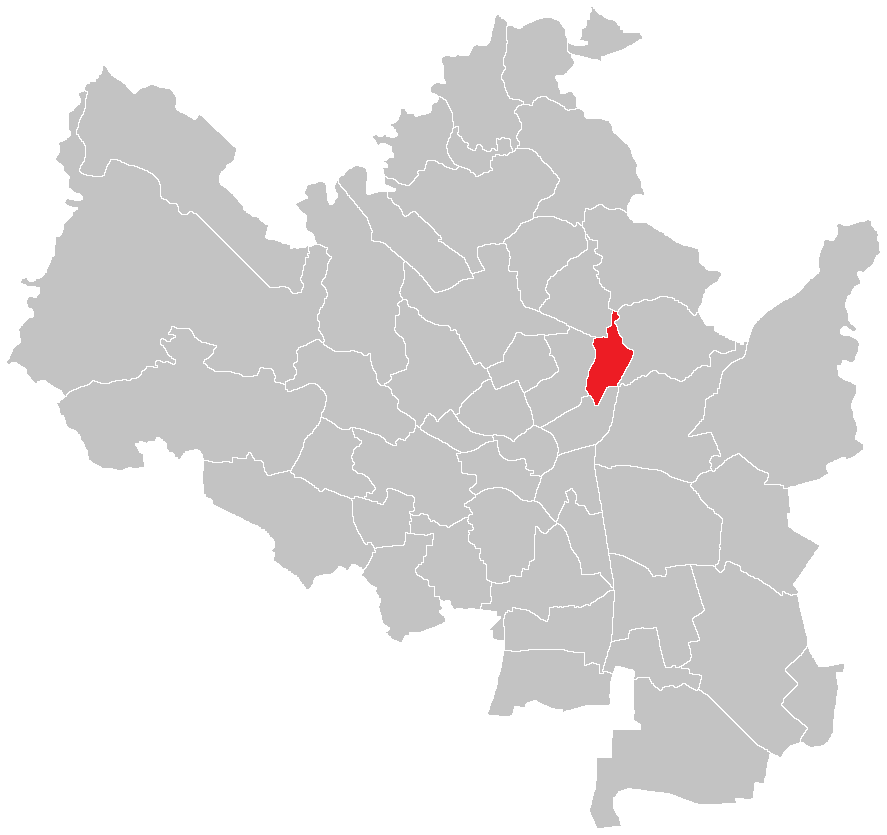
- Location of Husovice in Brno 49°12′42″N 16°37′52″E
- Country: Czech Republic
- Region: South Moravian Region
- City: Brno
- City district: Brno-sever

Area
  - Total: 1.32 km^{2} (0.51 sq mi)

Population (2021)
  - Total: 6,915
  - Density: 5,240/km^{2} (13,600/sq mi)
- Time zone: UTC+1 (CET)
  - Summer (DST): UTC+2 (CEST)
- Postal code: 614 00

Husovice (German: Hussowitz) is a municipal part and cadastral territory in Brno-sever, a city district of the city of Brno, Czech Republic. It has an area of 1.32 km^{2}. Originally an independent city, it was annexed to Brno in 1919, since November 24, 1990, it has been part of the city district of Brno-sever. Almost 7,000 people live here.

The Husovice development is located on the western bank of the river Svitava.

== Name ==
The name of the village was derived from the personal name Hus, which is identical to the generic hus, or "goose". The name originally sounded like Husici (written as Husicz in the oldest document from 1264), originally it was the name of the inhabitants of the village and meant "Hus's people". In written documents after 1264 there is always the ending -ovice (apparently it was taken from the names of the neighboring villages Cacovice, and Zábrdovice).

== History ==
Husovice, founded in the 13th century (the first written mention is in 1264), was a small village for a long time. Originally, it was a landowner's village, whose land soon began to come into the possession of the Brno townspeople, the nobility, and the church. In the 13th century, the Zábrdovice Premonstratensian monastery acquired Husovice tithes and some land. There was probably a mill and at least two yards here already then. Husovice suffered heavily in the years 1419–1434 during the Hussite Wars and in the years 1468–1478 during the Bohemian–Hungarian War. At the beginning of the 17th century, Husovice had only 18 settled people. Husovice also suffered great damage during the Siege of Brno by the Swedes in 1643 and 1645. However, this damage was removed by the 1770s. Before the first half of the 18th century, the number of houses more than doubled in connection with the development of local industry. In 1834, Husovice burned down and was rebuilt. Around the middle of the 19th century, the village's rapid growth began, which led to the expansion of local buildings along all existing roads. Until the abolition of serfdom, the municipal administration in Husovice was headed by a burgomaster, a vogt, and two aldermen. In 1912, Husovice was elevated to a town and in 1919 it was annexed to Brno.

== Character ==
Husovice, which has a predominantly urban character, consists of several parts. On the one hand, it is low-lying and, with some exceptions, flat southern part with a very dense regular urban development, in which there is the local Church of the Sacred Heart of the Lord, the trolleybus depot of the Public Transport Company of the City of Brno and the art nouveau building of the local Sokol in Dukelská Street, as well as several smaller shops. This part is bordered to the north by Provazníková Street, where it adjoins the area further west between Provazníková Street and Kohoutová Street, in which there are several panel houses, and also the area further east with sparser irregular buildings of the original village, which is adjacent to the higher family development on Klidná, Míčkova, Lozíbky, Nouzová and Slezákova streets. North of this part is the former workers' colony "Písečník". The northernmost part of today's Husovice is represented by multi-story apartment buildings with flat roofs on the eastern side of Soběšická Street.

== Territorial divisions ==
The cadastral territory of Husovice is further divided into 4 basic settlement units.

Basic settlement unit	Population		
Basic settlement unit	2011	2021	Change
Svitavská	2,059	2,080	+1.0%
Náměstí Republiky	2,090	2,333	+11.6%
Bratří Mrštíků	565	524	-7.3%
Cacovická	1,924	1,978	+2.8%

== Demographics ==
Historical population

Year	Pop.	±%
1869	2,259	—
1880	3,541	+56.8%
1890	6,958	+96.5%
1900	8,764	+26.0%
1910	11,012	+25.7%

Year	Pop.	±%
1921	10,977	−0.3%
1930	14,712	+34.0%
1950	17,473	+18.8%
1961	17,320	−0.9%
1970	9,261	−46.5%

Year	Pop.	±%
1980	7,153	−22.8%
1991	5,532	−22.7%
2001	5,473	−1.1%
2011	6,638	+21.3%
2021	6,915	+4.2%

The population decrease between 1961-1970 was due to border changes in 1969.
Source: Censuses

== Monuments ==
In addition to the Church mentioned above of the Sacred Heart of the Lord, the following buildings were declared cultural monuments: the Svatoboj theater on Cacovická Street, the burgher's house No. 346 on náměstí Republiky and the road bridge over the Svitava. The small housing colony is also architecturally interesting, i.e. a group of four houses in Vranovská, Trávníčkova, Jan Svoboda, and Zubatéh streets from 1925 to 1927 according to the project of Josef Polášek.

== Religion ==
In Husovice, there is a Roman Catholic parish established on January 1, 1911, and a congregation of the Evangelical Church of the Czech Brethren, which has its prayer room on Netušilová Street. The Kingdom Hall of Jehovah's Witnesses stands on Hálková Street, and the Orthodox monastery of the Czech Princess Ludmila operates on Vranovská Street. In a small house at Gargulákova street No. 5, the now-defunct Baptist congregation had its prayer room, between 1984 and 2015 the space was used by the religious community of the Czechoslovak Hussite Church. From 2018 to 2019, the Czechoslovak Hussite Church reconstructed the Hussite House into a Parochial Center with social apartments.
