= Brno-Bosonohy =

- City District of Brno
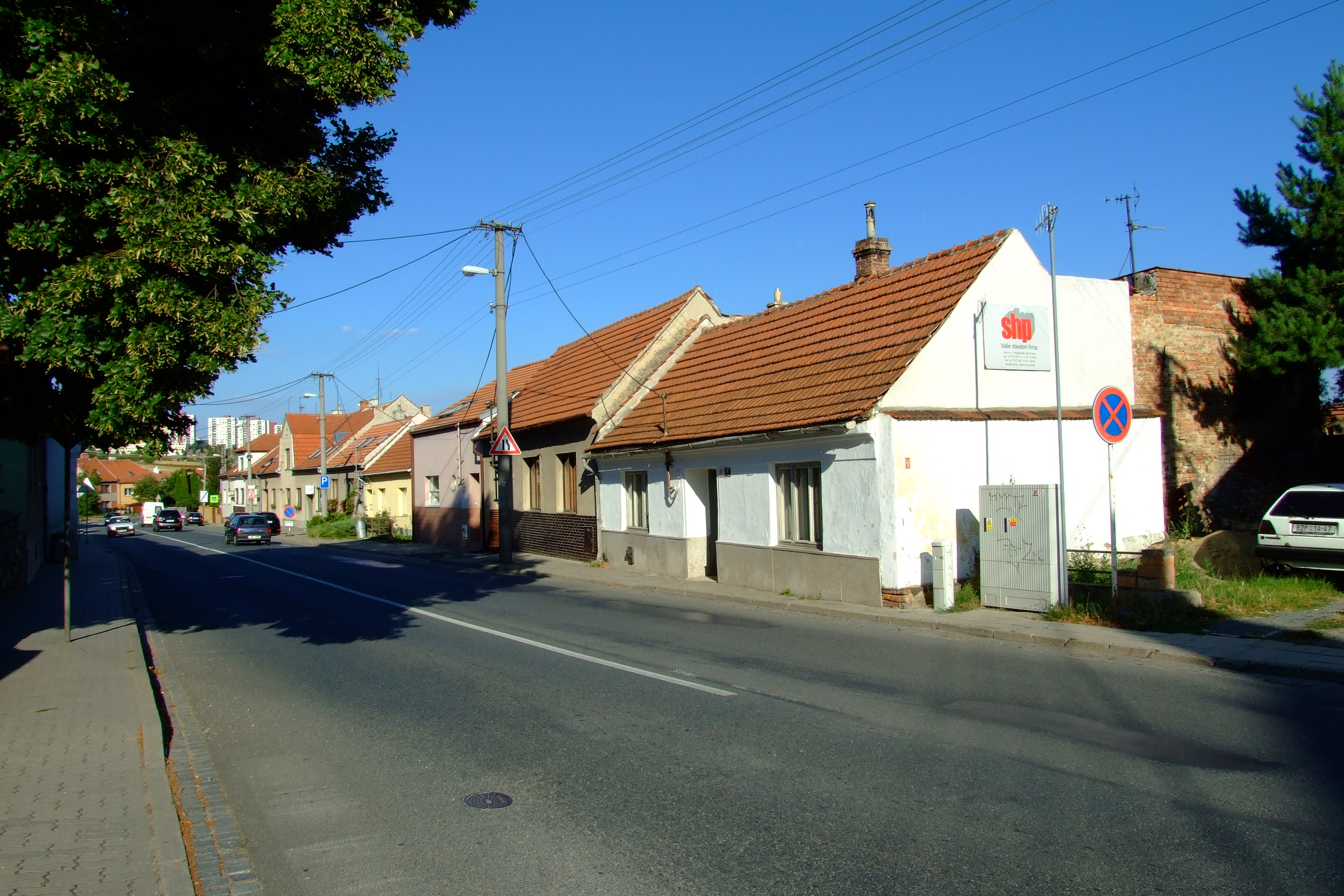
- Pražská street

- Flag Coat of arms

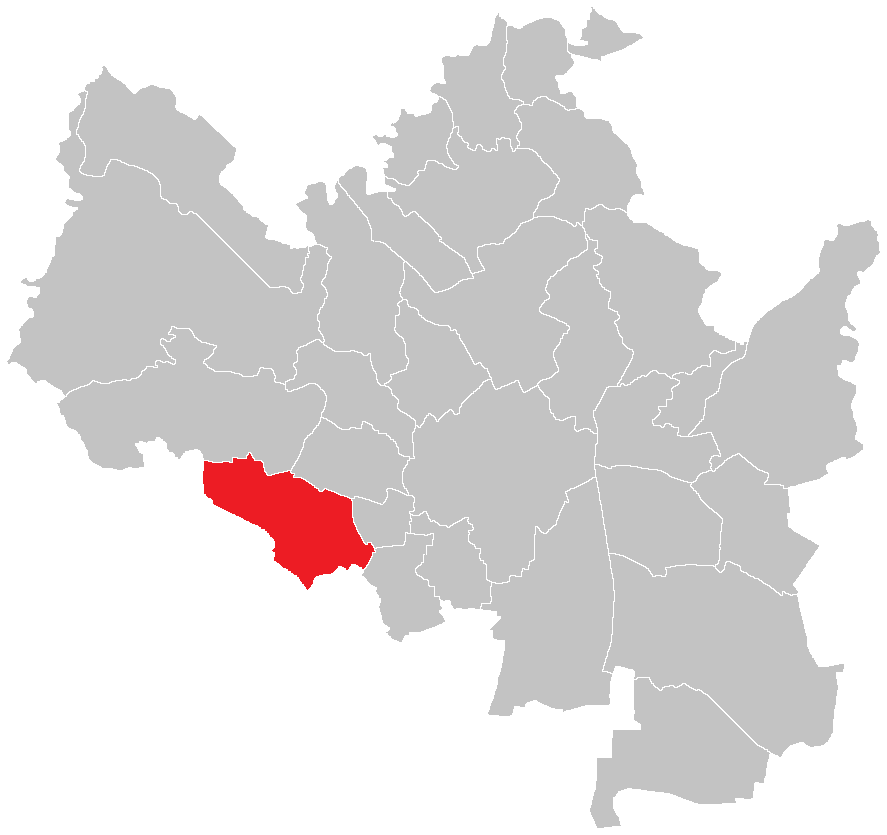
- Location of Brno-Bosonohy in Brno
- Coordinates: 49°10′34″N 16°31′45″E
- Country: Czech Republic
- Region: South Moravian
- City: Brno

Government
  - Mayor: Martin Černý (KDU-ČSL)

Area
  - Total: 7.15 km^{2} (2.76 sq mi)

Population (2023)
  - Total: 2,832
  - Density: 396/km^{2} (1,030/sq mi)
- Time zone: UTC+1 (CET)
  - Summer (DST): UTC+2 (CEST)
- Postal code: 642 00
- Website: www.bosonohy.cz

Brno-Bosonohy is a city district in the southwest of the city of Brno, Czech Republic. It consists of the municipal part and cadastral territory of Bosonohy (German: Parfuß) and a small part of neighbouring Kohoutovice. Bosonohy was originally an independent municipality that was annexed to Brno in 1971. The city district was established on 24 November 1990. About 2,800 people live here.

For the purposes of the Senate elections, Brno-Bosonohy is included in electoral district number 59 of Brno-City District.

== Etymology ==
The name of the village was originally the name of its inhabitants (bosonohové = "those who walk barefoot"). The original German name Barfuss/Parfuss was translated from Czech.

== Geography ==
Brno-Bosonohy borders on the north with Brno-Žebětín and Brno-Kohoutovice, on the east with Brno-Nový Lískovec, on the southeast with Brno-Starý Lískovec and the municipality of Ostopovice, on the south and southwest with Troubsko, and in the west with Popůvky.

Brno-Bosonohy has an area of 7.15 km^{2} The Leskava stream flows through Bosonohy. There are forests in the north and west of the city district, while in the west is the grove Bosonožský hájek, protected as a nature reserve. Bosonohy still retains the character of a larger village, the centre of which is the square Bosonožské náměstí.

== History ==
One of the oldest documents of the settlement of today's Bosonohy was found on the wooded Hradisko hill, located northwest of Bosonohy. In addition to the remains of the former fort, objects from the Hallstatt and Jevišovice cultures from the Late Stone Age were found here.

Bosonohy was annexed into Brno on 26 November 1971, and was then an independent district of Brno with its own local national committee until 31 December 1975. At first it was named Brno XV-Bosonohy, from 1 May 1972, just Brno-Bosonohy. From 1 January 1976, to 23 November 1990, Bosonohy was part of the Brno I district. After the Velvet Revolution, on 24 November 1990, the current city district of Brno-Bosonohy was established here.

On 17 August 2017, the area of the Pavlovská primary school was moved from Bosonohy to Kohoutovice.

== Demographics ==
Historical population

Year	Pop.	±%
1869	802	—
1880	897	+11.8%
1890	1,030	+14.8%
1900	1,133	+10.0%
1910	1,417	+25.1%

Year	Pop.	±%
1921	1,513	+6.8%
1930	1,822	+20.4%
1950	2,038	+11.9%
1961	2,143	+5.2%
1970	2,345	+9.4%

Year	Pop.	±%
1980	2,372	+1.2%
1991	2,137	−9.9%
2001	2,210	+3.4%
2011	2,457	+11.2%
2021	2,602	+5.9%

Source: Censuses

== Transport ==
Although the D1 motorway from Prague to Brno passes through the southern edge of Bosonohy, the inhabitants of Bosonohy have no direct connection to it. The same is the case with the road to the west, leading from the neighbouring municipality of Troubsko, which can be used to reach neighbouring Brno-Žebětín or nearby Brno-Bystrc. Bosonohy itself has a direct road connection with the city districts of Brno-Kohoutovice and Brno-Starý Lískovec, as well as with Troubsko, with which it is connected by bus lines 401 and 402. The transport connection to the city centre is available via bus lines 69 and N96 (night line), which have a final stop here. The railway line from Brno to Náměšť nad Oslavou and beyond passes through the southern edge of Bosonohy, but there is no stop for it here.

== Sights ==
On the Bosonožské náměstí square, next to the town hall, there are the Chapel of St. Florian, a monument to the victims of the world wars and a memorial tree line.
