= Brno-Medlánky =

- City District of Brno
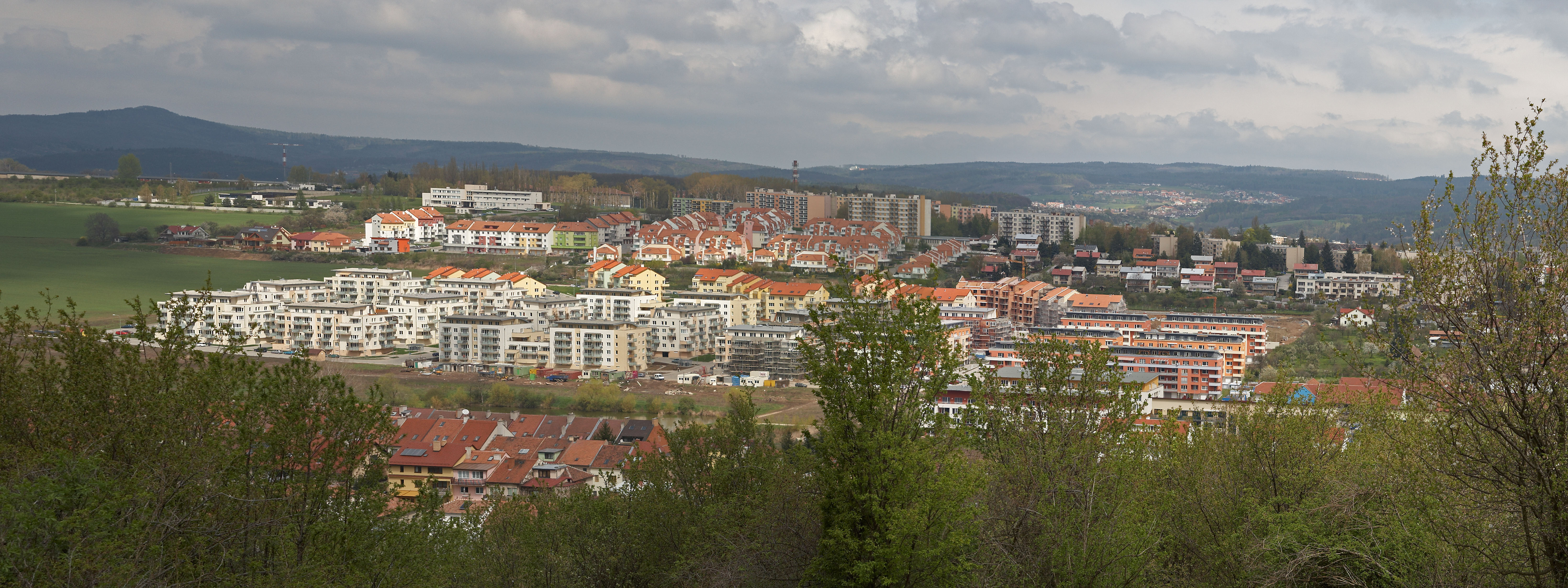
- Modern housing estate in Medlánky

- Flag Coat of arms

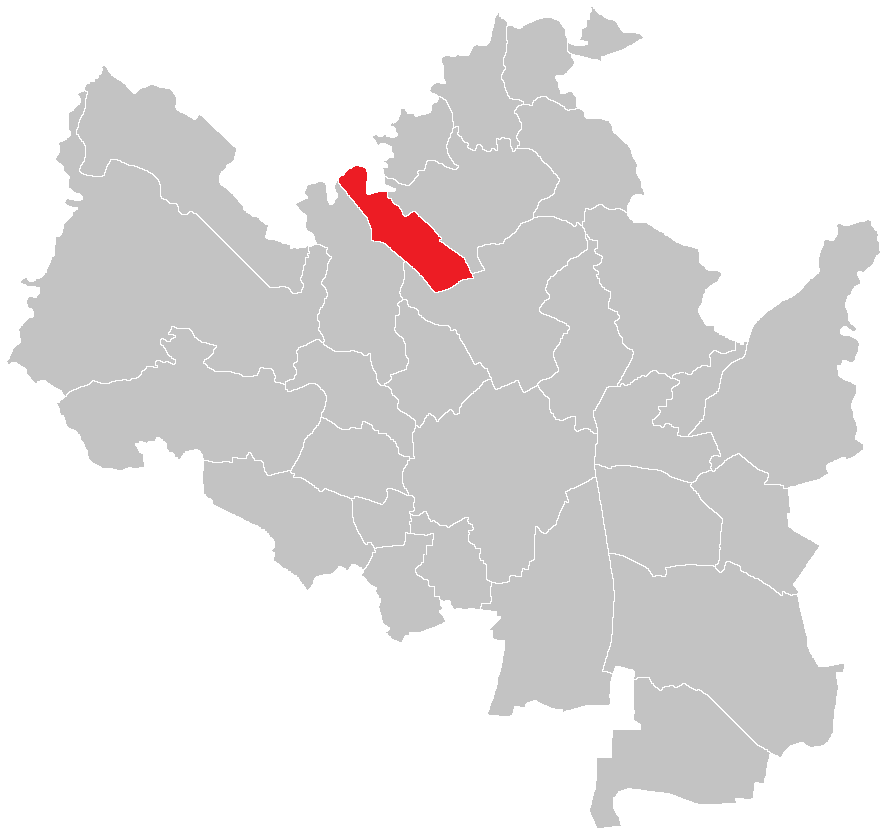
- Location of Brno-Medlánky in Brno 49°14′30″N 16°34′26″E
- Country: Czech Republic
- Region: South Moravian Region
- City: Brno

Government
  - Mayor: Michal Marek

Area
  - Total: 3.51 km^{2} (1.36 sq mi)

Population (2023)
  - Total: 5,865
  - Density: 1,670/km^{2} (4,330/sq mi)
- Time zone: UTC+1 (CET)
  - Summer (DST): UTC+2 (CEST)
- Postal code: 621 00
- Website: http://medlanky.cz/

Brno-Medlánky is a city district of Brno, Czech Republic, on the northern edge of the city. It consists of the district and cadastral territory of Medlánky (German: Medlan), originally an independent municipality that was annexed to Brno in 1919. Its cadastral area is 3.51 km². The city district was established on November 24, 1990. About 6,000 people live here.

The Medlánky Airfield is located in the cadastre of the district, mainly with gliders. Medlánky is also home to the V pústých vineyard track. For the purposes of the senate elections, Brno-Medlánky is included in electoral district number 60 of the Brno-City District.

== Etymology ==
The name of the settlement is a diminutive of the original designation of its inhabitants, Medlané (the oldest document from 1237 has the wording Medlan), which meant "people from medla", meaning slowly flowing water (the name is the opposite in meaning to the name of the nearby Bystrc). A diminutive form is documented from the end of the 16th century in the form of Mydlánky, and from the 17th century also Medlánko.

== History ==
=== Beginnings ===
Open to the south, the Medlánky area with an abundance of loess soils forms part of the long-established area of southern Moravia, as evidenced by archaeological findings. This is evidenced by the frequency of finds in the Medlánky brickyard, especially the settlement pit discovered in 1905 with decorated, preserved bell-shaped cups of the culture of the same name (2000 BC) and the burial ground found in 1935–1937 with the graves of typical "squatters" of the Bronze Age - Unetic culture (1900 –1700 BC).

During a survey in 1954 and subsequent planned rescue research in 1964 and 1984 at the construction sites of Meopta and the Research Institute of Energy, the Archaeological Institute of Czechoslovakia also uncovered dozens of foundations of stilt houses and pit settlement buildings with grain cellars from the period of the bin field culture (Velatic culture, 1250–1000 BC, and Podolian culture, 1000–700 BC) and from the early Iron Age (Horák culture, 700–400 BC). Archaeologists place one uncovered settlement pit - a granary with ancient pottery - in the 8th century, and almost 70 others - of which 8 are residential stilt pits, with stone ovens in the corner - in the 9th century, i.e. the period of creation and expansion of Great Moravia.

The history of the following centuries, which have not yet been documented by settlements or grave finds, gives a right to conclude that at that time the community settled here developed into a settlement or village of the Přemyslid dynasty - the property of the monarch, as historical sources bluntly inform us.

=== Middle Ages ===
The first preserved written document proving the existence of the village at this time is the charter of King Wenceslaus I from August 14, 1237, by which Medlánky, destroyed by his own war campaign and still belonging to the school of St. Peter in Brno, exchanges for his undamaged property in Bosonohy.

After 1237, historical sources are silent about Medlánky for more than 100 years. Only in the years 1344–1380 are Brno townsmen mentioned as owners. In the years 1381–1489, Medlánky was owned by the lords of Medlanský from Medlan, then from 1489 to 1559 by the Pernštejn family. For this 70-year-long ownership, the year 1532 is significant for Medlánky, when the then owner Jan IV of Pernštejn (he was then the regional governor of the Margraviate of Moravia) freed the subjects of Medlánky from slavery – this privilege lasted for about 100 years and was abolished during the post-Battle of White Mountain era. From 1559 to 1588, Medlánky was owned by Petr Sadovský from Sloupno, who bought it from the Pernštejn family together with the Sokolnice manor. In 1588, Hendrych Pfefferkorn from Ottopach became the new owner of Medlánky for 22 thousand gold. However, he did not enjoy his wealth for long, as he died soon after. In 1590, the indebted descendants sold Medlánky to Jindřich the Younger, Burgrave from Dohna. Even here, however, ownership did not last long, and in 1596 Medlánky became the property of Bohuslav Bořita from Budeč.

In the post-White Mountain period, in 1622, Bohuslav Bořita from Budeč sold Medlánky to Alžběta Pergarka from Perg, née Kummerová, who owned Medlánky until 1650. During these years, Medlánky was held for a short time by Ferdinand Zikmund Sak from Bohuňovice, who, however, he got into debt and sold Medlánky as early as 1650. They thus find themselves once again in the possession of the Perg family. Alžběta, however, bequeathed this property to her daughter Prisca, who at the time was married to the Count of Magni. František Magnis made a relatively fast career during the Thirty Years' War. First he was a knight, a free lord, then an earl. In Moravia, he held the office of the highest chamberlain, in 1640 he was appointed administrator of the land, and from 1649 he was a regional judge. He died in 1652.

After his death, the childless widow of Jan František Prisca of Magni founded the Marie Školská Foundation (so-called Mariaschul) in 1654 for the education of young noblewomen and middle-class daughters. In her will dated January 29, 1654, she bequeathed to this foundation not only 60,000 Rhenish gold, numerous jewels and jewels, but also the palace on the corner of 3 Kobližná Street, which was later rebuilt into a palace of the nobles, as well as two gardens and her farm Medlánky. Cardinal Franz von Dietrichstein took over the patronage of the foundation and entrusted the Italian builder Jan Křtitel Erna with the construction of a new building for the needs of the foundation. According to Ern's proposal, in the years 1674–1679, the house on today's Náměstí Svobody was built into a palace of the nobles. According to the wishes of the Countess, the empress always became the chief directors of the foundation. They appointed the heads of the foundation, they were ladies from noble families - single lady countesses.

=== Modern history ===
At the beginning of the 19th century, the foundation was transformed into the Secular Providence Institute of the Nobles and underwent a number of changes over the course of the century. Since 1880, the noble foundation (C. k. Adelige Stiftung) used the title C. k. Then, in 1913, the statute of the foundation was changed and it was given the new name Adelige Stiftung Maria Schul, then in 1918, with an incorrect translation, the name Maria Školská Women's Foundation.

The assets of the aforementioned foundation lasted until 1947/1949, when its assets were taken over by the Ministry of Agriculture of the Czechoslovak Republic as part of the land reform and social pensions were paid to the beneficiaries from the foundation. In the period of collectivization of agriculture, the Unified Agricultural Cooperative (JZD) was established in Medlánky in 1951. At first they were made up of landless people and metal farmers. Later, farmers came in with their property, forced to do so by the economic management of the land fund and the impossibility of farming independently.

The JZD in Medlánky prospered until 1975, when it merged with JZD Komín and only a branch plant remained in Medlánky with decreasing profitability of vegetable production and floriculture, ending in bankruptcy. It was left with the dilapidated and unused buildings of the former farm with adjacent land, where the reconstruction of the area and new construction is currently underway.

In the second half of the 1960s, during the second cadastral reform of Brno, major changes were made to the boundaries of Medlánky, during which Medlánky lost, among other things, the south-eastern corner with houses on the eastern side of Kuřimská street and the area of the brickyard to Řečkovice, and to Královo Pole the southernmost part, where the university dormitories are located today. On the contrary, then they acquired forest land in the northeast of Komín or the peripheral northern part of Královo Pole.

As far as urban development is concerned, a large-scale change took place in Medlánky after 1968, when, thanks to the initiative of several young enthusiasts (the Hlaváčová brothers, Ing. Sedlák, Mrs. Pokorná and others), the Jabloňová housing estate was established here, which is partly located on land originally belonging to Královo Pole. After its completion (designed by Ing. Arch. Fuchs and Ing. Arch. Rozehnal), the population of Medlánky almost tripled.

In 2009, a new modern housing estate on V Újezdech street was built in Medlánky, built as part of the Kouzelné Medlánky and Nové Medlánky projects.

The city district is home to one of the three Czech SOS children's villages (the others are in Doubí near Karlovy Vary and Chvalčov).

== Territorial divisions ==
Medlánky is further divided into 5 basic settlement units.

Basic settlement unit	Population		
Basic settlement unit	2011	2021	Change
Sídliště Jabloňová	2,300	2,124	-7.7%
Vozovna Medlánky	10	7	-30.0%
Náměstí Odboje	750	832	+10.9%
Kytnerova	2,813	3,077	+9.4%
Bosně	25	63	+152.0%

== Demographics ==
As of the 2021 census, the population is 6,103, up 3% from 5,898 in the 2011 census. The population has more than doubled since 1991 thanks to new housing estates.

Historical population

Year	Pop.	±%
1869	343	—
1880	368	+7.3%
1890	464	+26.1%
1900	491	+5.8%
1910	721	+46.8%

Year	Pop.	±%
1921	765	+6.1%
1930	1,461	+91.0%
1950	1,442	−1.3%
1961	1,326	−8.0%
1970	1,067	−19.5%

Year	Pop.	±%
1980	1,641	+53.8%
1991	2,425	+47.8%
2001	3,163	+30.4%
2011	5,898	+86.5%
2021	6,103	+3.5%

Source: Censuses

== Landmarks ==
In 1935, the State Heritage Institute in Brno registered the following buildings as monuments in Medlánky: the castle, the castle park, the manor's courtyard, the statue of St. John of Nepomuck, a bell tower, a memorial to the fallen, two crosses and a prehistoric find in a brickyard. According to a more recent list, seven buildings are protected by the National Monument Institute.

=== Castle and castle park ===
Cultural monument. Originally a ground-floor building of early Baroque construction used by the Marie Školská Foundation, raised by one floor in the mid-19th century. The park in the south facade of the castle was planted with ornamental trees after the fruit garden was cut down. Over time, the original baroque character of the park acquired the character of an English garden with mature coniferous and deciduous trees. At the turn of the 20th and 21st centuries, a fundamental reconstruction of the park took place - clearing of encroached trees and planting ornamental trees.

=== Manor Court ===
The manor's courtyard is a ground-floor baroque building, still in 1935 with beautiful arched window grilles, it was completed in the form known from the photographs in 1765 – 1766. In the 1990s of the 20th century, the reconstruction of the courtyard began and in its part, the former granary, the Social center Medlánek - SÝPKA. Reconstruction of the side tracts of the building is also gradually taking place.

=== Statue of St. John of Nepomuk ===
Statue of St. John of Nepomuk is a valuable baroque sculpture by an unknown author from 1750, it is protected as a monument.

=== Belfry ===
Cultural heritage. The belfry on the corner of Kytnerova and Suché streets was undoubtedly built at the same time as the statue of St. John of Nepomuk. This is evidenced by the bell cast in 1758 by the company I.F. Klietz. Another inscription on the bell, Anna constantia freyn miniatin, apparently proves that its donor was the Free Lady Konstancie Miniatiová from Campoli, b. Žalkovská from Žalkovice, who in the years 1749–1759 was the director of the Marie Školská Foundation, which was the land lord for Medlánky until 1948. There is no information about her today.

In 2021, a two-story family house was built in close proximity to the bell tower, thus losing its dominant position.

=== The cross ===
The memorialists had registered two in Medlánky: an iron one on Kytnerova Street - at the border with the Řečkovice cadastre and a wooden one, later replaced by a stone one, on the way to the airport. The third, not recorded in the description of monuments, is located in the Castle Park.

=== Monument to the resistance and the fallen ===
The monument to the resistance and the fallen was built on the 10th anniversary of the creation of Czechoslovakia in 1928 at the initiative of the local Czechoslovak legionary community with the contribution of other Medlánky associations and citizens. During the World War II - after the arrival of the German authorities - it was dismantled and stored in a safe place. However, it was not found in its original form after the war and was therefore replaced by a new monument during its re-installation in 1992.

=== A prehistoric site in a brickyard ===
The findings are described in the section on the prehistory of Medlánky. Thanks to changes in cadastral boundaries, the territory is now located in the cadastral territory of Řečkovice.
