= Brno-Žabovřesky =

- City district of Brno
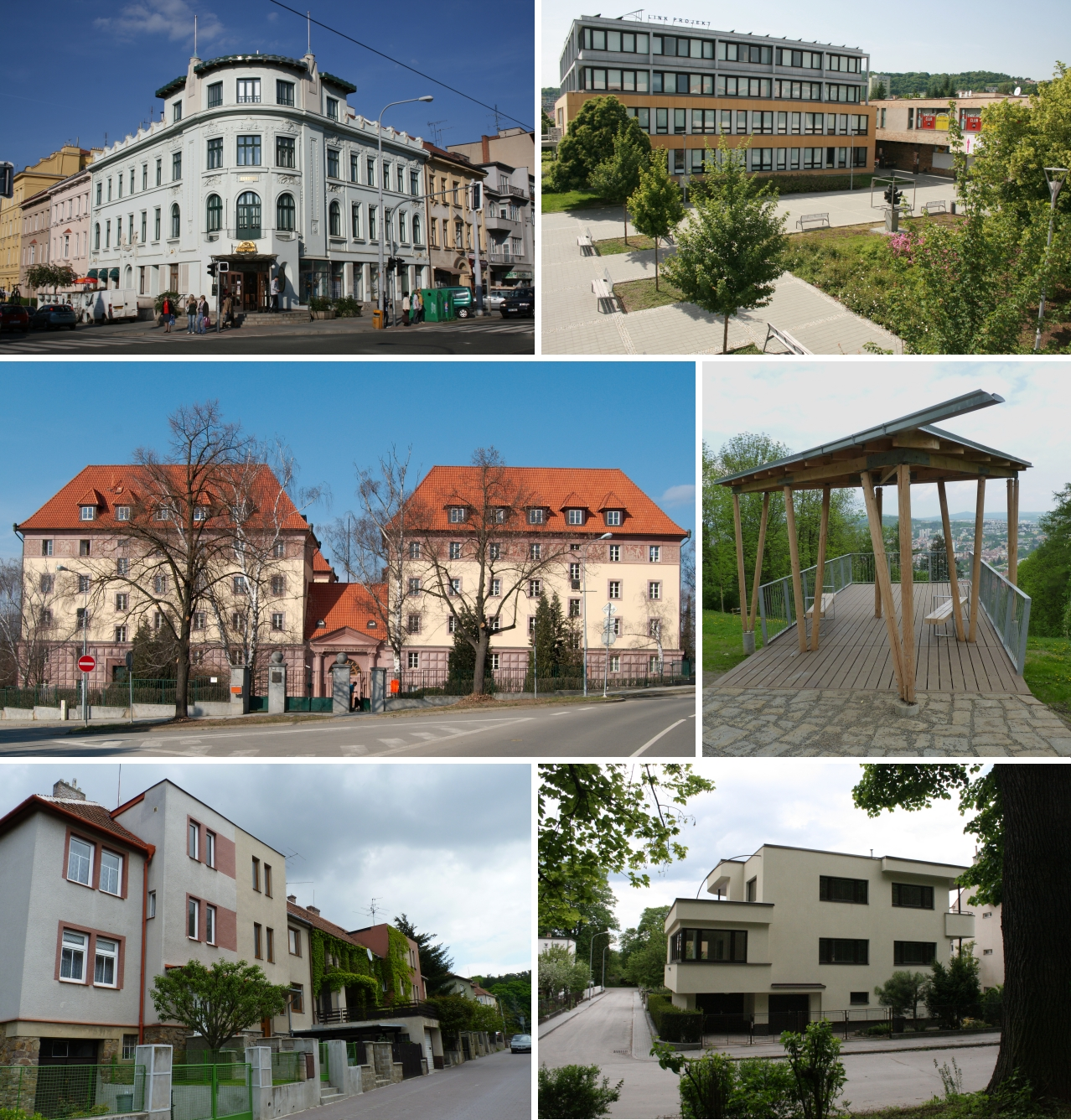
- Clockwise from top left: Art Nouveau house from 1908, Kounicovy koleje, Eliška Machová street, Makovského Square, Wilson's forest

- Flag Coat of arms

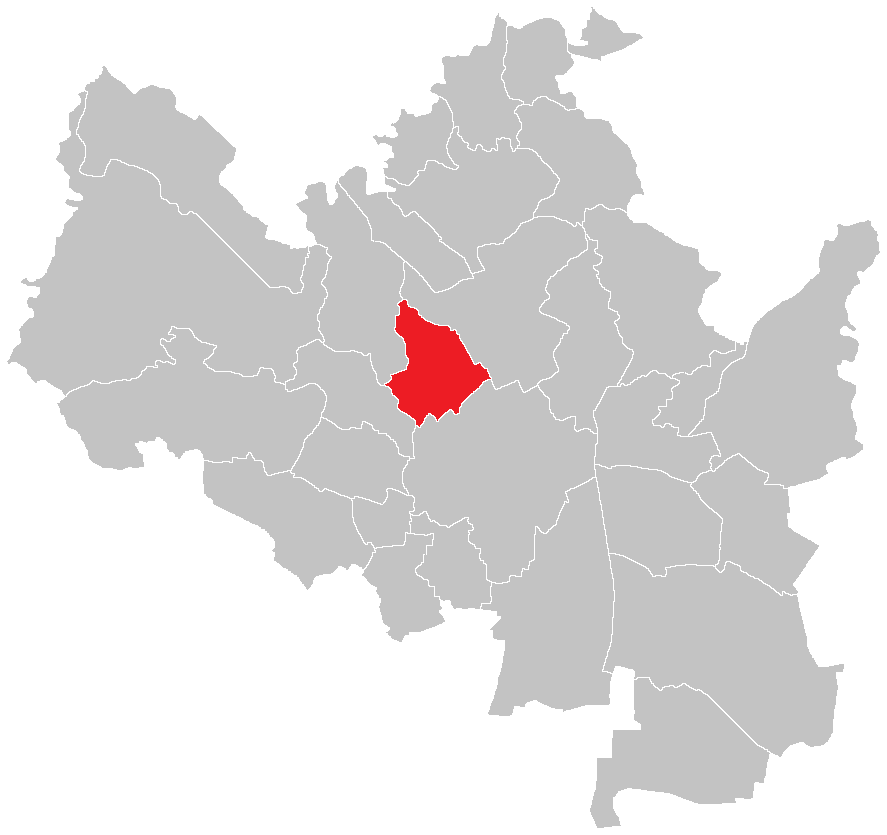
- Location of Brno-Žabovřesky in Brno 49°12′52″N 16°34′31″E
- Country: Czech Republic
- Region: South Moravian Region
- District: Brno-City
- City: Brno

Government
  - Mayor: Filip Leder (KDU-ČSL)

Area
  - Total: 4.35 km^{2} (1.68 sq mi)
- Elevation: 215 m (705 ft)

Population (2021)
  - Total: 21,262
  - Density: 4,890/km^{2} (12,700/sq mi)
- Time zone: UTC+1
  - Summer (DST): UTC+2
- Postal code: 616 00
- Website: https://www.zabovresky.cz/

Brno-Žabovřesky (German: Sebrowitz, Hantec: Žabiny) is a city district of Brno, a city in the South Moravian Region of the Czech Republic. The current city district was established on 24 November 1990. It is entirely made up of the municipal part and cadastral area of Žabovřesky, a former town that was annexed into Brno in 1919. It has 21,262 inhabitants.

Žabovřesky is located on the left bank of the Svratka. The forest park Wilsonův les (Lit. 'Wilson's forest') is located in the south, while the forest park Palackého vrch is located in the northern part.

== Geography ==
Brno-Žabovřesky borders the city districts of Brno-střed in the southeast, Brno-Královo Pole to the east and northeast, Brno-Komín to the northwest and Brno-Jundrov to the southwest.

== Territorial divisions ==
Žabovřesky is further divided into 14 basic settlement units.

Basic settlement unit	Population		
Basic settlement unit	2011	2021	Change
Březinova	1,254	1,100	-12.3%
Chládkova	1,280	1,272	-0.6%
Elišky Machové	2,007	2,104	+4.8%
Horova	1,498	1,647	+9.9%
Kameníčkova	1,080	1,155	+6.9%
Kounicovy koleje	1,797	1,818	+1.1%
Makovského náměstí	2,984	2,919	-2.2%
Náměstí Svornosti	1,939	1,827	-5.8%
Palackého vrch	-	11	-
Pod kaštany	2,490	2,489	-0.0%
Rosického náměstí	1,949	2,223	+14.0%
U vodárny	716	713	-0.4%
Žabovřesky-louky	9	26	+188.9%
Žabovřesky-sever	2,044	1,958	-4.2%

== Demographics ==
As of the 2021 census, the population is 21,262, of which 47.4% are males, and 52.6% are females. People under 15 years old make up 14.1% of the population, and people over 65 years old make up 24.7%.

Historical population

Year	Pop.	±%
1869	1,200	—
1880	1,515	+26.2%
1890	2,057	+35.8%
1900	2,632	+28.0%
1910	4,510	+71.4%

Year	Pop.	±%
1921	5,862	+30.0%
1930	11,253	+92.0%
1950	14,066	+25.0%
1961	17,000	+20.9%
1970	24,086	+41.7%

Year	Pop.	±%
1980	28,208	+17.1%
1991	24,069	−14.7%
2001	22,280	−7.4%
2011	21,047	−5.5%
2021	21,262	+1.0%

Source: Censuses
