= Brno-Starý Lískovec =

- City District of Brno
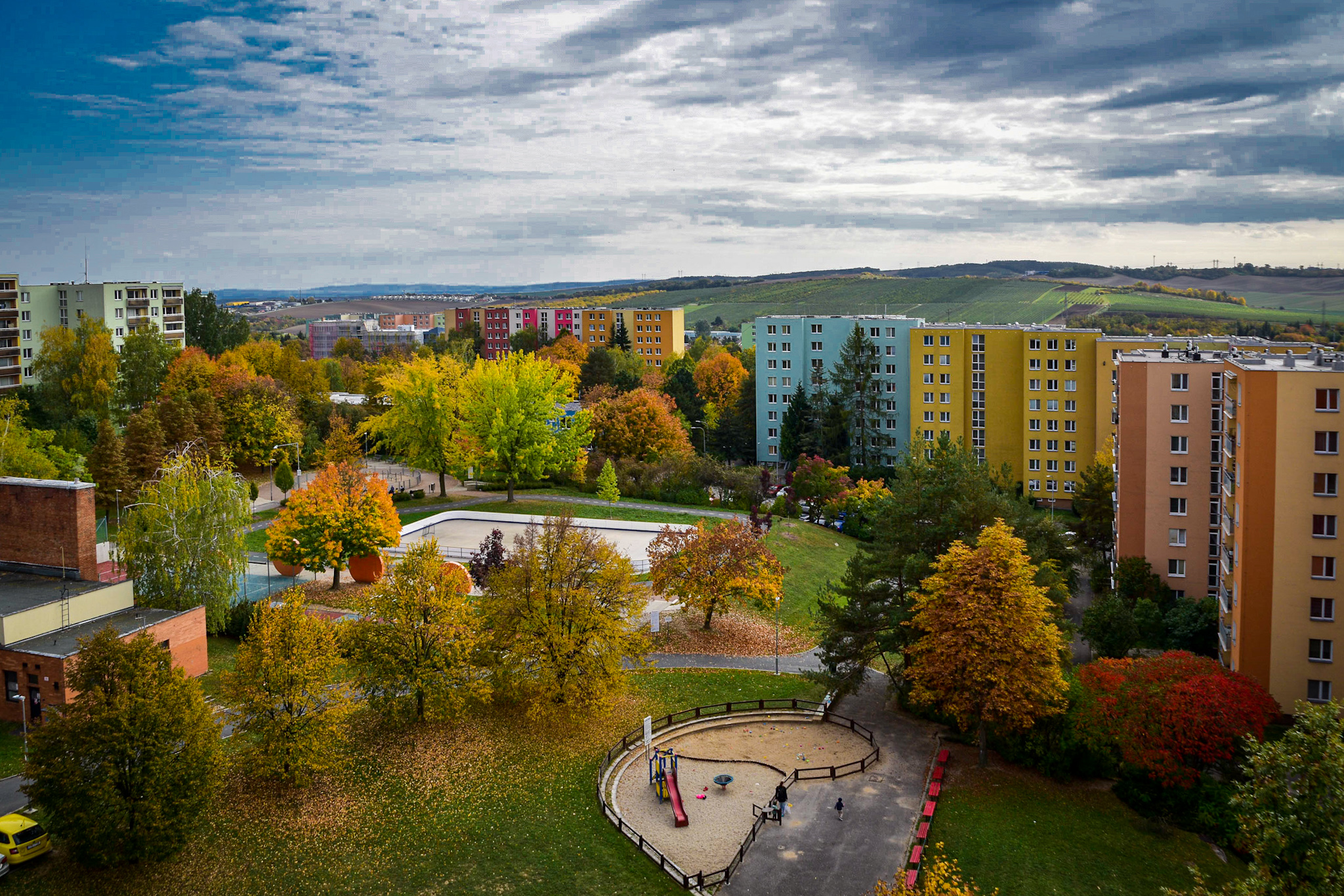
- Housing estate in Starý Lískovec and playground Sluníčko

- Flag Coat of arms

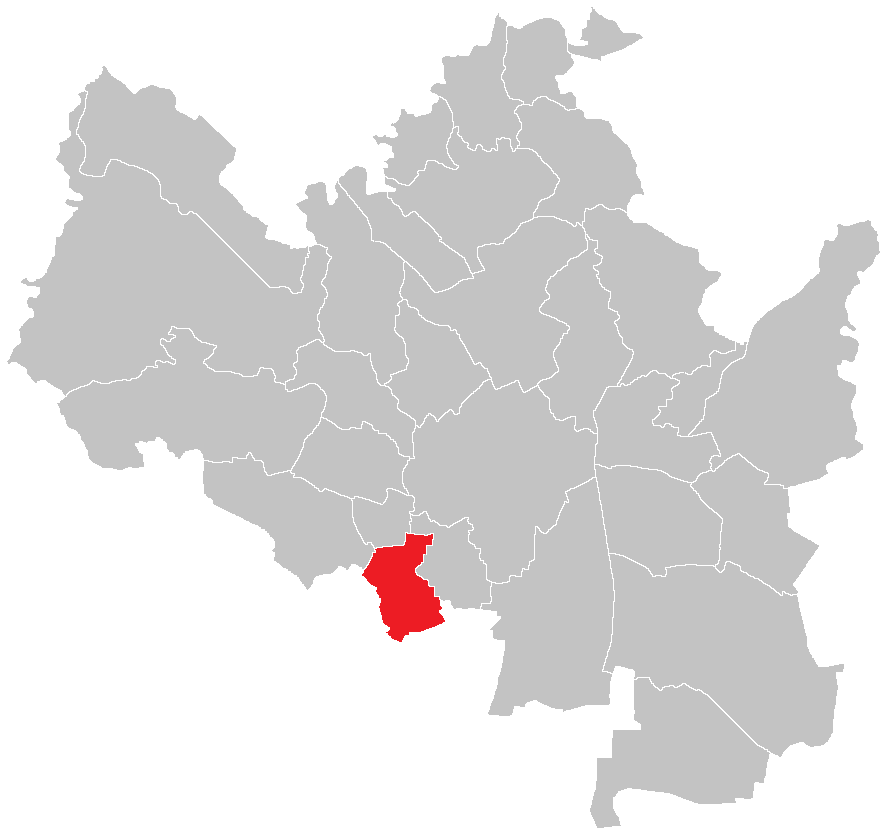
- Location of Brno-Starý Lískovec in Brno 49°10′9″N 16°33′44″E
- Country: Czech Republic
- Region: South Moravian Region
- City: Brno

Government
  - Mayor: Vladan Krásný (ODS)

Area
  - Total: 3.28 km^{2} (1.27 sq mi)

Population (2023)
  - Total: 12,966
  - Density: 3,950/km^{2} (10,200/sq mi)
- Time zone: UTC+1 (CET)
  - Summer (DST): UTC+2 (CEST)
- Postal code: 625 00
- Website: https://www.staryliskovec.cz/

Brno-Starý Lískovec is a city district of Brno, Czech Republic, located on the southwestern edge of the city. It consists of most of the cadastral territory of Starý Lískovec (German: Alt Leskau, lit. 'Old Lískovec'), which has all of the city district's population, along with a small part of Nový Lískovec (German: Neu Leskau), originally the municipality of Lískovec (German: Leskau), which was annexed to Brno in 1919. The total area is 3.28 km^{2}. The city district was established on November 24, 1990. Over 12,000 people live here.

For the purposes of the senate elections, Brno-Starý Lískovec is included in electoral district number 59 of Brno-City District.

== History ==
In 2020, an archaeological survey of another part of the settlement took place here, which preceded the construction of the tram line to the faculty hospital in Brno. The edge of this settlement was found near it and in it the remains of two houses and between them construction pits, from where clay was taken for plastering the walls. Settlement pits and storage pits were also found, as well as various objects, such as ceramic fragments, remains of various tools or fragments of animal bones. Signs of fire were also found in the house made of wattle and daub.

The first mention of the village of Lískovec dates back to 1314. The village was formed by the core of the current urban district, the still existing original village development in the vicinity of Klobásova street. The municipality of Lískovec became a part of Brno on April 16, 1919.

In 1972, panel construction was started in Starý Lískovec. In contrast to the neighboring Bohunice, it was carried out much more sensitively in Starý Lískovec, because it did not affect the original infrastructure in any way. The overlap of the Bohunice part of the built housing estate on the-then Starý Lískovec cadastral territory became the reason for a significant change of the border between Bohunice and Starý Lískovec, carried out at the end of the 1970s. The current city district of Brno-Starý Lískovec was established on November 24, 1990.

Further changes to the cadastral boundaries of Starý Liskovec took place in 2002 and 2011. First, on February 28, 2002, a minor change to the border with Nový Lískovec at the northern edge of the road in Jihlavská street came into force, when 23 m^{2}, located under the southern part of the building with the Nový Lískovec reference number 441, passed to Nový Lískovec. On February 17, 2011, it entered another border change between Starý Lískovec and Bohunice came into force, this time at the intersection of Osová and Jihlavská streets, when 4221 m^{2} passed from Starý Lískovec to Bohunice, while 3609 m^{2} went from Bohunice to Starý Lískovec.

To another minor change in the administrative boundary of Brno-Nový Lískovec and Brno-Starý Lískovec in 2012, when the marginal part of the Nový Lískovec cadastral territory was transferred to the territory of the Brno-Starý Lískovec district, which in turn transferred a small marginal part of the Starý Lískovec cadastral territory.

== Description ==
The residential development of Brno-Starý Lískovec consists mainly of panel houses built at the end of the 1970s to the north and west of the village houses of the original municipality. From the development of the Nový Lískovec cadastral territory, only the eastern part of the gas station in Bítešská Street, together with the multi-lane road in this street, belong here. There is also a swimming pool, as well as and sports club Tatran Starý Lískovec in the district. The cinema is no longer in operation, the building now houses sports facilities under the management of the workers' physical education unit, and a restaurant has recently opened in the building.

The area of the Bohunice faculty hospital, including the central high-rise main building, extends into the northernmost part of Starý Lískovec. In the years 2007–2008, west of it, initially free land was built up. First, in 2007, the new building of the Moravian Land Archives was built here, and at the end of 2008, the new Campus Square shopping center was opened here, but it also extends into the neighboring district of Brno-Bohunice.

The Roman Catholic church of St. Jan Nepomucký, which was built in 1923–1925. A short distance below the church, directly opposite the school building, was the local cemetery. It was abolished in the 1970s.

== Territorial divisions ==
The cadastral territory of Starý Lískovec is further divided into 6 basic settlement units, while the part of Nový Lískovec in this district is divided into one, Mezi Lískovci-Jihlavská.

Basic settlement unit	Population		
Basic settlement unit	2011	2021	Change
Jihlavská-fakultní nemocnice	-	0	-
K Moravanům	6	6	0%
Klobásova	1,514	1,382	-8.7%
Leskava	343	1,138	231.8%
Mezi Lískovci-Jihlavská	-	0	-
Mikuláškovo náměstí	7,794	7,240	-7.1%
Sevastopolská	3,274	3,016	-7.9%

== Demographics ==
Historical population

Year	Pop.	±%
1869	507	—
1880	583	+15.0%
1890	688	+18.0%
1900	863	+25.4%
1910	1,218	+41.1%

Year	Pop.	±%
1921	2,082	+70.9%
1930	2,022	−2.9%
1950	2,783	+37.6%
1961	1,899	−31.8%
1970	1,511	−20.4%

Year	Pop.	±%
1980	16,740	+1007.9%
1991	15,862	−5.2%
2001	14,220	−10.4%
2011	12,931	−9.1%
2021	12,782	−1.2%

Source: Censuses

== Transport ==
The connection with the rest of the city is provided by the Brno transport company via tram lines no. 6 and 7 running from the Starý Lískovec loop to Královo Pole, the railway station from Černá Pole to Zemědělská, or line no. 8, which provides a connection between the Bohunice faculty hospital and Líšeň, further using trolleybus line No. 25 connecting Starý Lískovec and Líšní. Also passing through Starý Lískovec is bus line No. 50, which connects Komárov with Bystrc, and line No. 69 connecting Bosonohy with Bohunice, or buses providing transport between Brno and its nearby countryside, i.e. buses No. 401, 402, 403, 404, 405 and 406.

New since December 2015 is the express bus line E50, which connects Černovická terasa with the newly built Kamechy housing estate at the junction of Bystrc and Žebětín. A year later, another express bus line E56 was established, which provides a connection between the Bohunice faculty hospital and Královo Pole railway station. At night, transport is provided by night bus lines N91 and N96.

In the spring of 2020, work began on the modernization of the railway line to Zastávka. As part of it, the Brno-Starý Lískovec stop was built, which was put into operation on December 12, 2021. Trolleybus routes from the Osová stop will be extended to this stop later.
