= Brno-Jundrov =

- City District of Brno
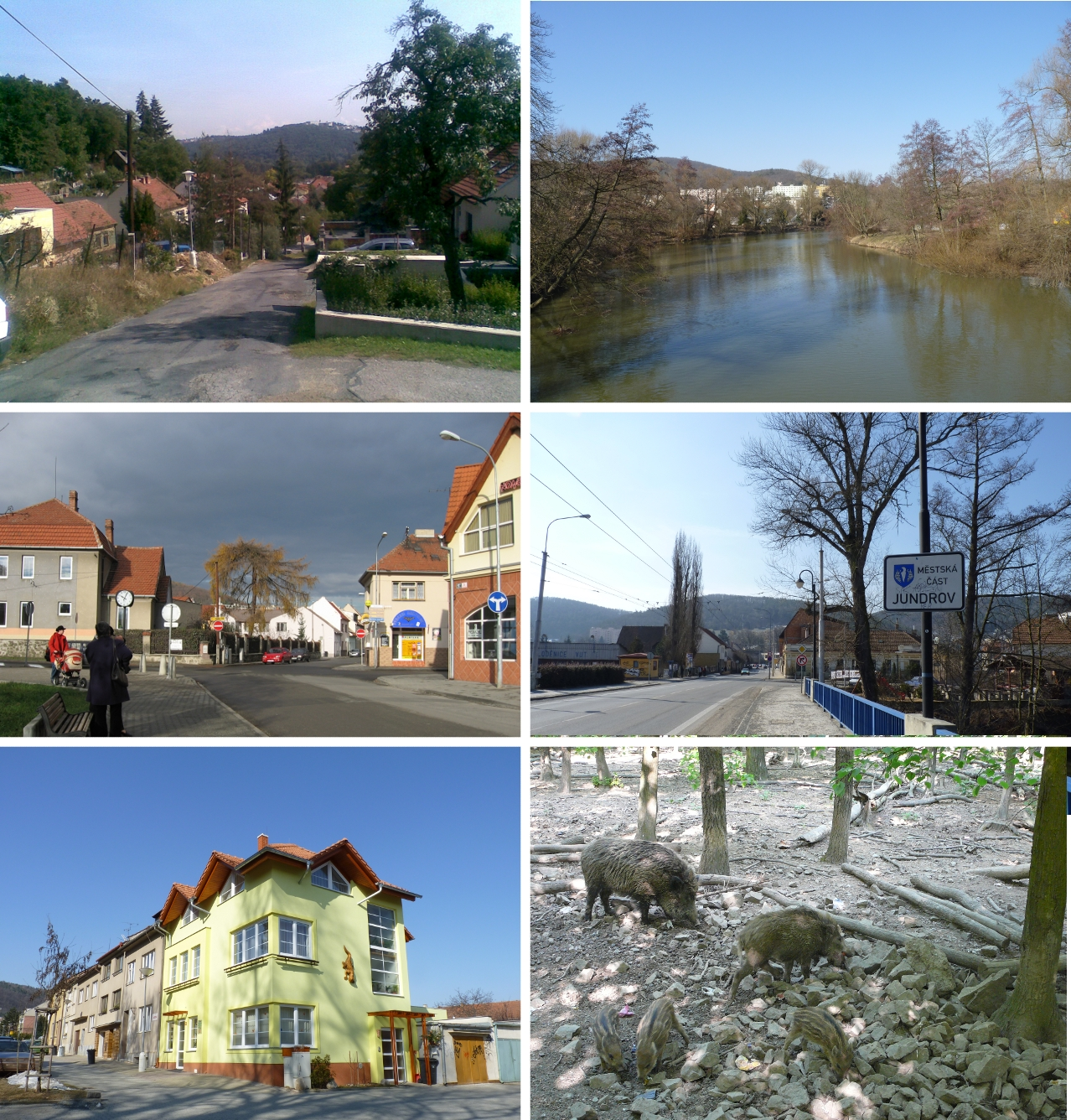

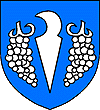
- Flag Coat of arms

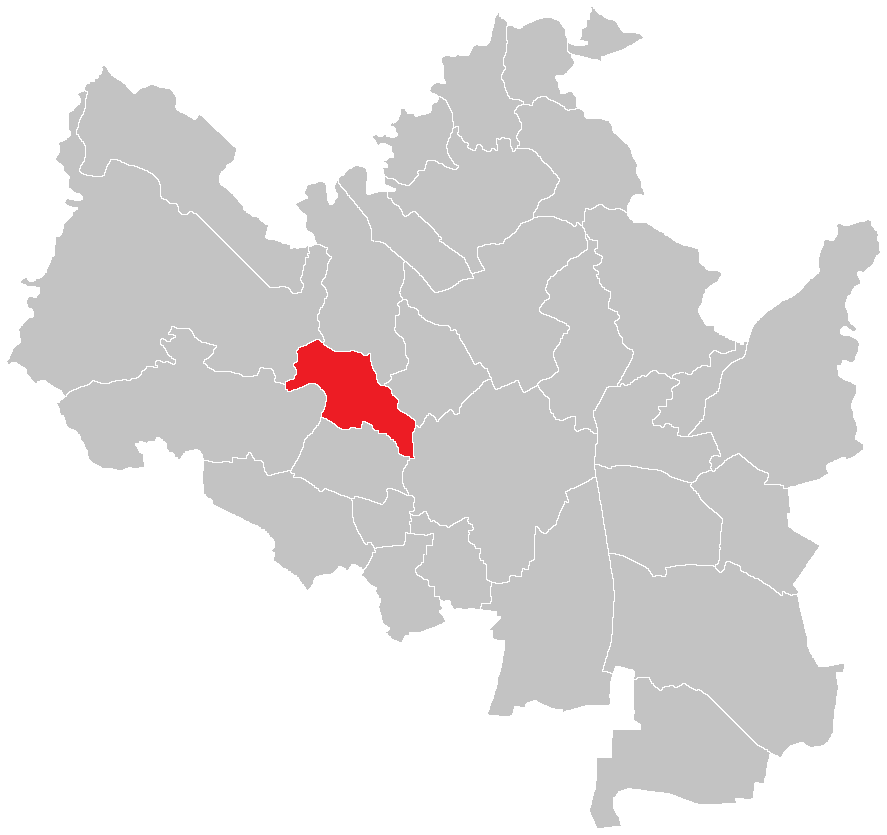
- Location of Brno-Jundrov in Brno
- Coordinates: 49°12′28″N 16°33′19″E
- Country: Czech Republic
- Region: South Moravian
- City: Brno

Government
  - Mayor: Ivana Fajnorová (Zelení)

Area
  - Total: 4.22 km^{2} (1.63 sq mi)

Population (2021)
  - Total: 4,617
  - Density: 1,090/km^{2} (2,830/sq mi)
- Time zone: UTC+1 (CET)
  - Summer (DST): UTC+2 (CEST)
- Postal code: 637 00
- Website: www.jundrov.info

Brno-Jundrov is a city district of Brno, Czech Republic, located in the western part of the city. It consists of most of the cadastral territory of Jundrov and a small northwestern part of the cadastral territory of Pisárky. The administrative district was established on 24 November 1990. Approximately 4,600 inhabitants live here.

For the purposes of the senate elections, the territory of the Brno-Jundrov district is included in electoral district number 60 of Brno-City District.

== Geography ==
Brno-Jundrov has an area of 4.22 km^{2}. The district is located on the right bank of the Svratka River. The surface of the district gradually rises from the level of the Svratka in the east and north to the wooded hills above the Jundrov housing estate in the west, which dominate the district.

== History ==
From a historical perspective, most of the territory of the modern district of Brno-Jundrov belonged to the cadastre of the former municipality of Jundrov, with a smaller portion belonging to the cadastre of the former municipality of Komín. However, a small part of the territory of the modern city district in the current cadastre of Pisárky (parcels 1495, 1492/1, 1510/21, 1493, 1494/2, 1494/3, southern part of parcel 1494/1, eastern part of parcels 1510/16 and 1492/2), originally belonging to Jundrov, was annexed to Brno in 1892 and incorporated into Old Brno.

The first mention of Jundrov, which used to be a feudal village then called Sulostovice, dates to 4 September 1277, when it was donated by King Ottokar II to the Chapel of St. John the Baptist at Špilberk Castle. By a charter of 23 March 1300, King Wenceslaus II donated the village to the Teutonic Order in Chełm under the name of Judendorf, which was later corrupted into its current form Jundrov. Under Margrave Jobst, it became the property of the Herbur Monastery in Brno. After its abolition in 1578, it was taken over by the Brno Jesuits, and from 1773 by the study fund. As part of the Řečkovice estate, Jundrov was owned by Josef Schindler from 1826. In the years 1850–1867, Jundrov was joined to Žabovřesky until it ultimately became part of Brno on 16 April 1919.

During the radical communist cadastral reform in Brno carried out in the second half of the 1960s, the northern, southern and eastern borders of the Jundrov cadastre were adjusted. The lands east of the Svratka became part of Žabovřesky, in the north the Jundrov cadastre was extended by a section of a wood originally belonging to Komín, while the land in the south, together with the western part of the Old Brno cadastre, was in turn incorporated into the newly created cadastral area of Pisárky.

The Brno-Jundrov district was established on 24 November 1990 and originally comprised the entire cadastral territory of Jundrov including ZSJ Mladá Hora, which consists of gardens and cottages. On 1 September 1995, the 25 August 1995 agreement on changing the border with the neighboring Brno-Kohoutovice district came into effect. On the basis of this agreement, a territorial exchange took place between the two districts. The municipality of Brno-Kohoutovice acquired a small southern part of the cadastral territory of Jundrov (ZSJ Mladá Hora) in exchange for a part of the Pisárky cadastre (houses and land on the west side of Veslařská Street). The current borders were solidified by the city district on 1 October 1995, when the border change agreement with the neighboring Brno-střed city district of 29 September 1995 became effective. Based on this agreement, the Brno-Jundrov administrative district acquired the territory between Veslařská Street and the Svratka River, bound in the south by the road leading from Kohoutovice to the Pisárky bridge.

Since 1991, the Brno-Jundrov district has had a coat of arms and a flag.

== Demographics ==
Historical population

| Year | Pop. | ±% |
|---|---|---|
| 1869 | 478 | — |
| 1880 | 583 | +22.0% |
| 1890 | 710 | +21.8% |
| 1900 | 1,090 | +53.5% |
| 1910 | 1,717 | +57.5% |

| Year | Pop. | ±% |
|---|---|---|
| 1921 | 2,142 | +24.8% |
| 1930 | 2,785 | +30.0% |
| 1950 | 3,158 | +13.4% |
| 1961 | 2,168 | −31.3% |
| 1970 | 2,035 | −6.1% |

| Year | Pop. | ±% |
|---|---|---|
| 1980 | 4,488 | +120.5% |
| 1991 | 3,630 | −19.1% |
| 2001 | 3,844 | +5.9% |
| 2011 | 4,132 | +7.5% |
| 2021 | 4,617 | +11.7% |

Source: Censuses

== Education ==
Dubová Kindergarten, Jasanová primary school, Rozmarýnová private kindergarten and primary school, and STING Academy Private College are located in Jundrov.
