= Brno-Chrlice =

- City District of Brno
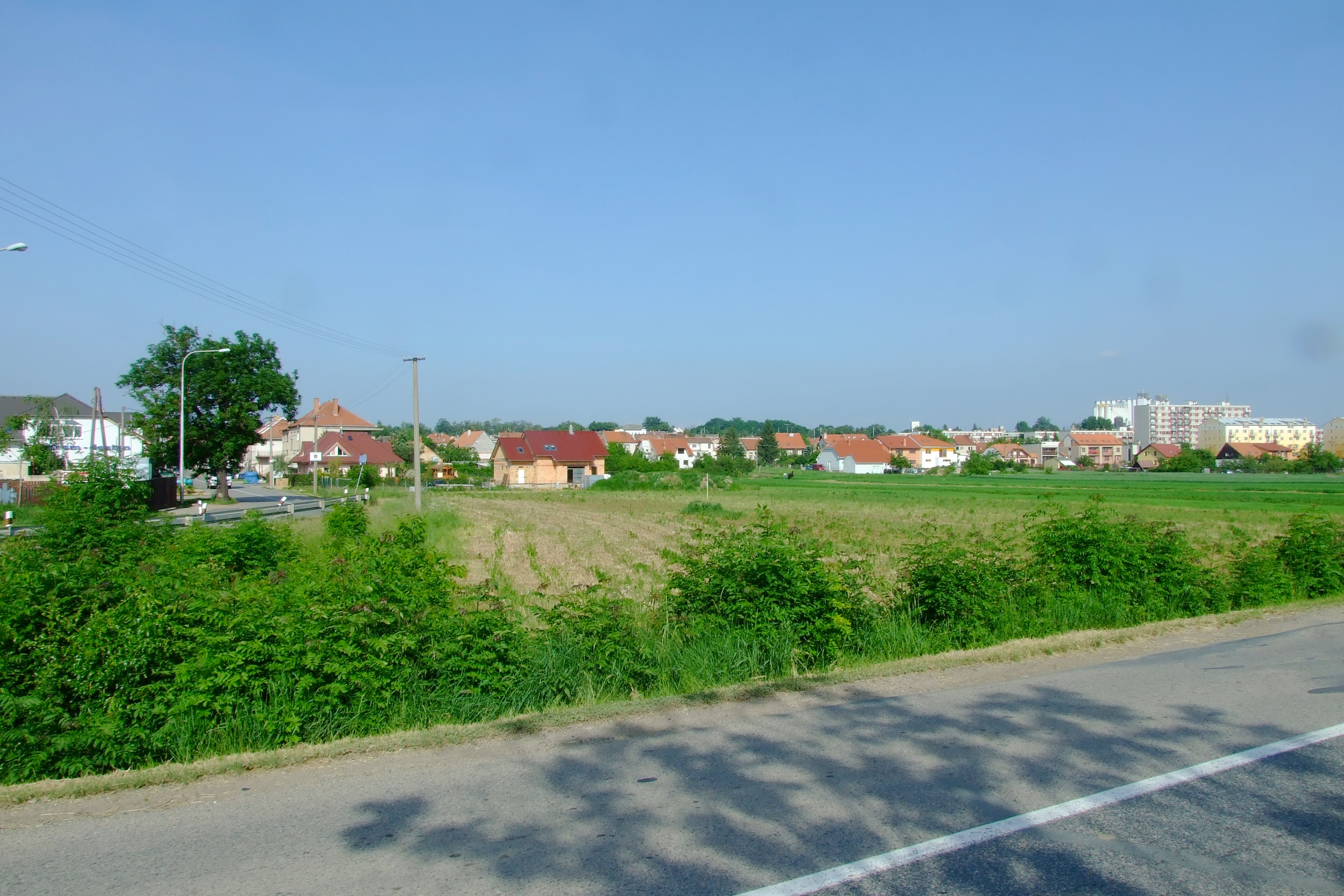
- View of Chrlice from the west

- Flag Coat of arms

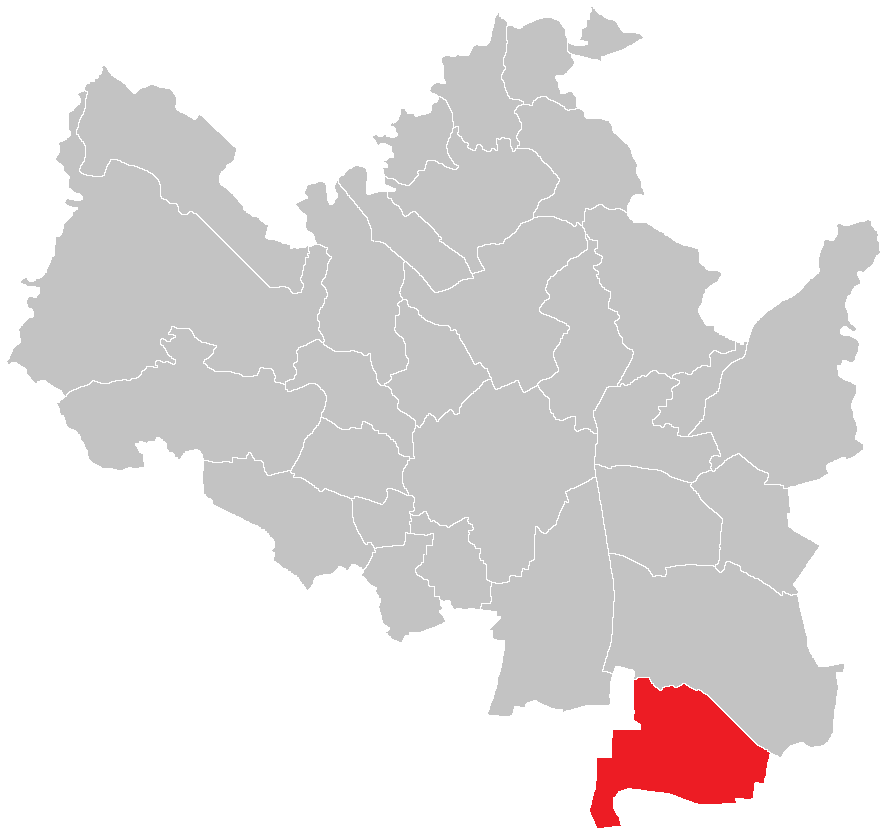
- Location of Brno-Chrlice in Brno
- Coordinates: 49°8′10″N 16°39′10.7″E
- Country: Czech Republic
- Region: South Moravian
- City: Brno

Government
  - Mayor: Lukáš Fila

Area
  - Total: 9.49 km^{2} (3.66 sq mi)

Population (2023)
  - Total: 3,691
  - Density: 389/km^{2} (1,010/sq mi)
- Time zone: UTC+1 (CET)
  - Summer (DST): UTC+2 (CEST)
- Postal code: 643 00
- Website: www.mcchrlice.brno.cz

Brno-Chrlice is a city district in the south part of the city of Brno, Czech Republic. It consists of the municipal part and cadastral territory of Chrlice (German: Chirlitz), originally an independent municipality that was annexed to Brno in 1971. The current city district was established on 24 November 1990. About 3,600 people live here.

== Etymology ==
The name Chrlice was derived from the personal name Chrla (the basis of which is either the verb chrliti – 'to throw' or the adjective chrlý – 'quick') and meant "Chrla's people". The German name (Kirlitz in the oldest documents) originated from Czech.

== Geography ==
Brno-Chrlice borders with Brno-Tuřany in the north, the municipalities of Modřice in the west, Rebešovice and Otmarov in the south, and Sokolnice in the east. It has an area of 9.49 km^{2}. Outside the Chrlice urban area, there are extensive areas of arable land, which fill most of Chrlice.

For the purposes of the senate elections, Brno-Chrlice is included in electoral district 58 of Brno-City District.

== History ==
The first written mention of Chrlice dates from 1320. It was already in the possession of the Archdiocese of Olomouc at that time, but the village was divided into fiefs, the holders of which changed during the following centuries. At the end of the 16th century, Chrlice became the centre of the episcopal estate. In 1787, the village of Růžový, which was an independent municipality between 1875 and 1949, was founded on the site of a parceled yard, close to Chrlice.

Chrlice (and Růžová) were annexed into Brno on 26 November 1971. Until 31 December 1975, they were an independent district of Brno with their own local national committee. The district was first called Brno XIV-Chrlice, and from 1 May 1972, only Brno-Chrlice. From 1 January 1976 to 23 November 1990, Chrlice was part of the Brno IV district. Since 23 November 1990, the current city district of Brno-Chrlice was established.

Since 2005, Brno-Chrlice has its flag.

== Demographics ==
Historical population

Year	Pop.	±%
1869	1,135	—
1880	1,328	+17.0%
1890	1,534	+15.5%
1900	1,608	+4.8%
1910	1,694	+5.3%

Year	Pop.	±%
1921	1,814	+7.1%
1930	2,314	+27.6%
1950	2,382	+2.9%
1961	2,647	+11.1%
1970	2,565	−3.1%

Year	Pop.	±%
1980	3,121	+21.7%
1991	3,110	−0.4%
2001	3,176	+2.1%
2011	3,722	+17.2%
2021	3,613	−2.9%

Source: Censuses

== Transport ==
The D2 motorway passes through the western part of Chrlice.

Brno-Chrlice is located on the railway line Letovice–Křenovice.

There is bus transport on route No. 64 on the route Chrlice to Maloměřice (Červený písek). There is also line number 78 from Židenice railway station or from the Olympia shopping mall in Modřice. Next, nightline number N95 from Kamenný vrch via the main railway station to the Chrlice loop. The regular bus line number 509 arrives in Chrlice from the direction of Měnín (some routes only go from/to Rajhradice).
