= Kohoutovice =

- Cadastral territory of Brno
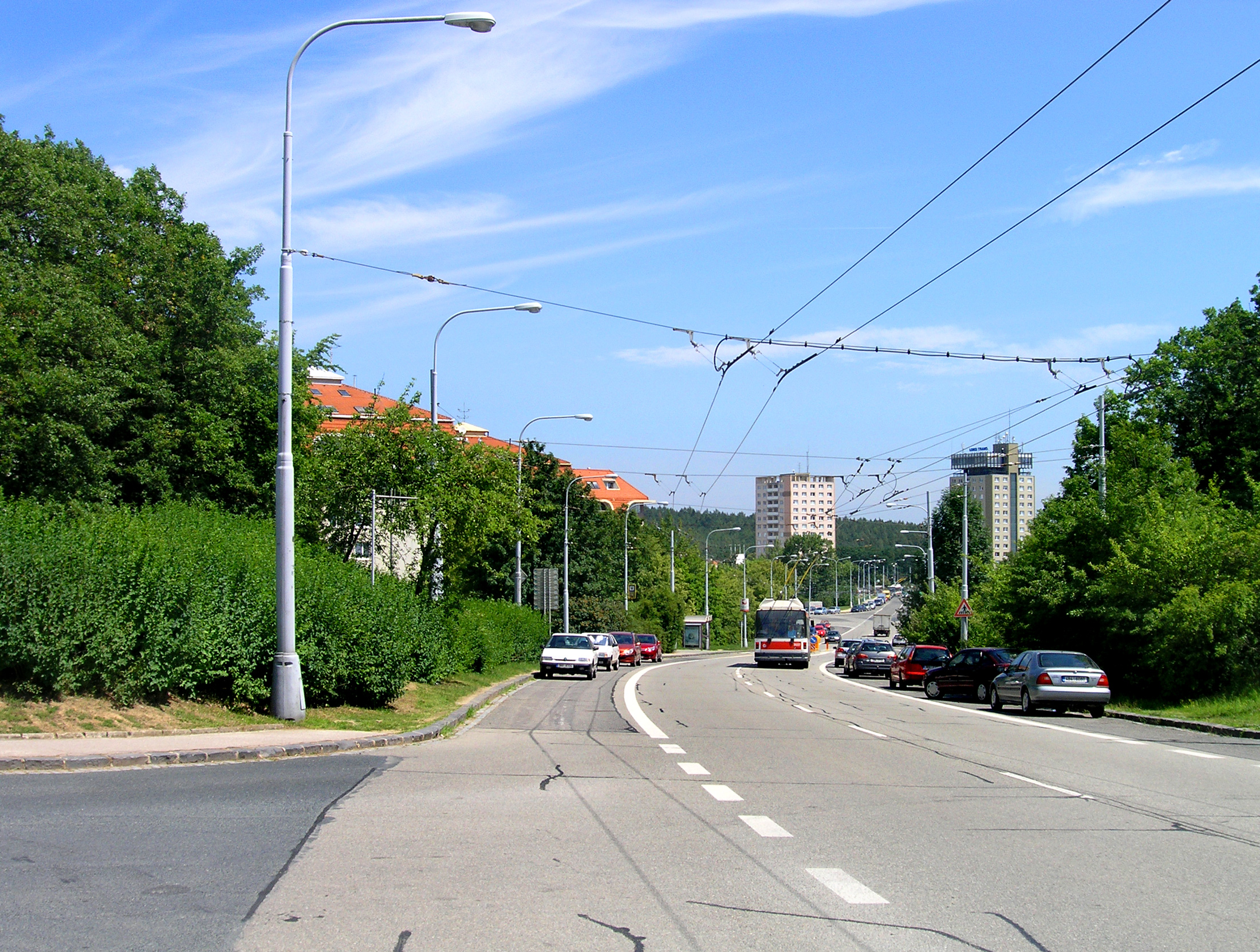
- Libušina třída street

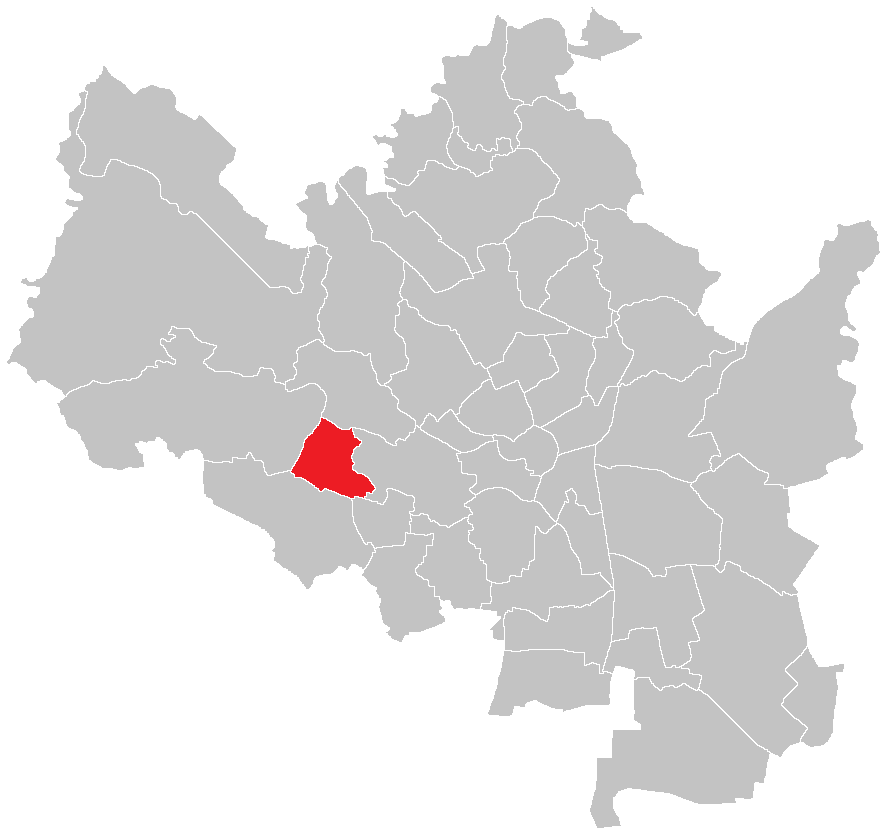
- Location of Kohoutovice in Brno 49°11′31″N 16°32′16″E
- Country: Czech Republic
- Region: South Moravian Region
- City: Brno
- City district: Brno-Kohoutovice

Area
  - Total: 2.38 km^{2} (0.92 sq mi)

Population (2021)
  - Total: 11,573
  - Density: 4,860/km^{2} (12,600/sq mi)
- Time zone: UTC+1 (CET)
  - Summer (DST): UTC+2 (CEST)
- Postal code: 623 00

Kohoutovice (German: Kohoutowitz) is a municipal part and cadastral territory in the west of the center of Brno, Czech Republic. It has an area of 2.38 km^{2}. Originally an independent municipality, it was annexed to Brno in 1919, since November 24, 1990 it has been part of the city district of Brno-Kohoutovice. Over 11,000 people live here.

The area around Pavlovská street, on the southern edge of the Kohoutovice cadastre, belonged to the territory of the then municipality of Bosonohy until 1979, while a narrow strip of territory to the west, including a piece of forest and a grove, belonged to the then municipality of Žebětín.

== Geography ==
The development of Kohoutovice, which is surrounded by forests, is made up of a relatively large panel housing estate that surrounds the rest of the original village. The dominant feature of the district is the Kohoutovice reservoir in the shape of an inverted cone, which can be seen from many sides of Brno.

Kohoutovice borders the cadastral territory of Jundrov to the north, Pisárky to the east, Nový Lískovec to the southeast, Bosonohy to the south and Žebětín to the west.

== Territorial divisions ==
The cadastral territory of Kohoutovice is further divided into 2 basic settlement units.

Basic settlement unit	Population		
Basic settlement unit	2011	2021	Change
Kohoutovice-sever	5,729	5,579	-2.6%
Kohoutovice-jih	6,435	5,994	-6.9%

== Demographics ==
As of the 2021 census, the population is 11,573, down 5% from 12,164 in the 2011 census, and 13% from the peak population of 13,327 in 1991.

Historical population

Year	Pop.	±%
1869	310	—
1880	365	+17.7%
1890	458	+25.5%
1900	588	+28.4%
1910	776	+32.0%

Year	Pop.	±%
1921	742	−4.4%
1930	1,089	+46.8%
1950	1,042	−4.3%
1961	1,344	+29.0%
1970	1,171	−12.9%

Year	Pop.	±%
1980	9,143	+680.8%
1991	13,327	+45.8%
2001	12,857	−3.5%
2011	12,164	−5.4%
2021	11,573	−4.9%

The population declining between 1961-1970 is due to border changes in 1969.
Source: Censuses
