= Brno-Nový Lískovec =

- City District of Brno
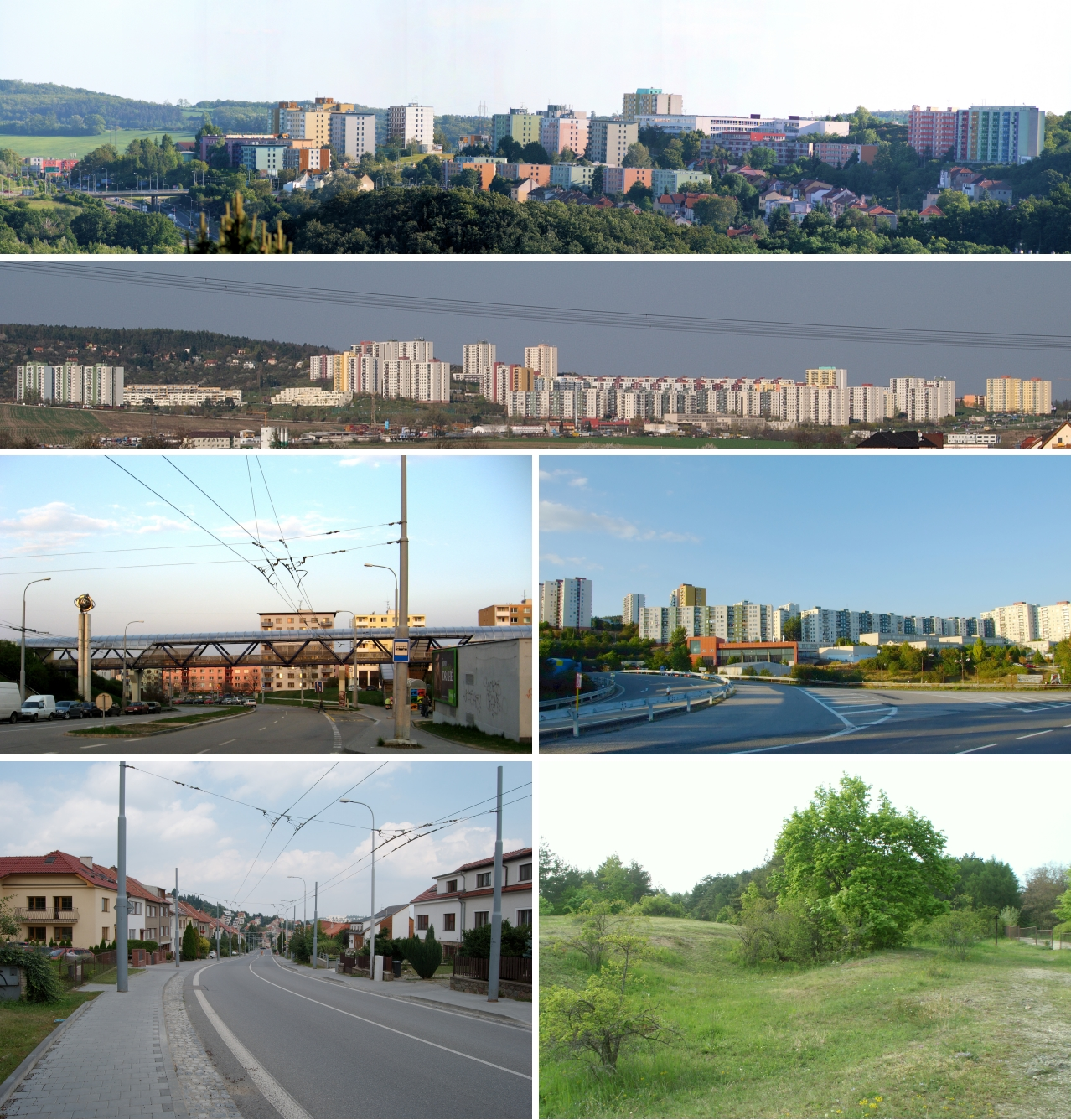

- Flag Coat of arms

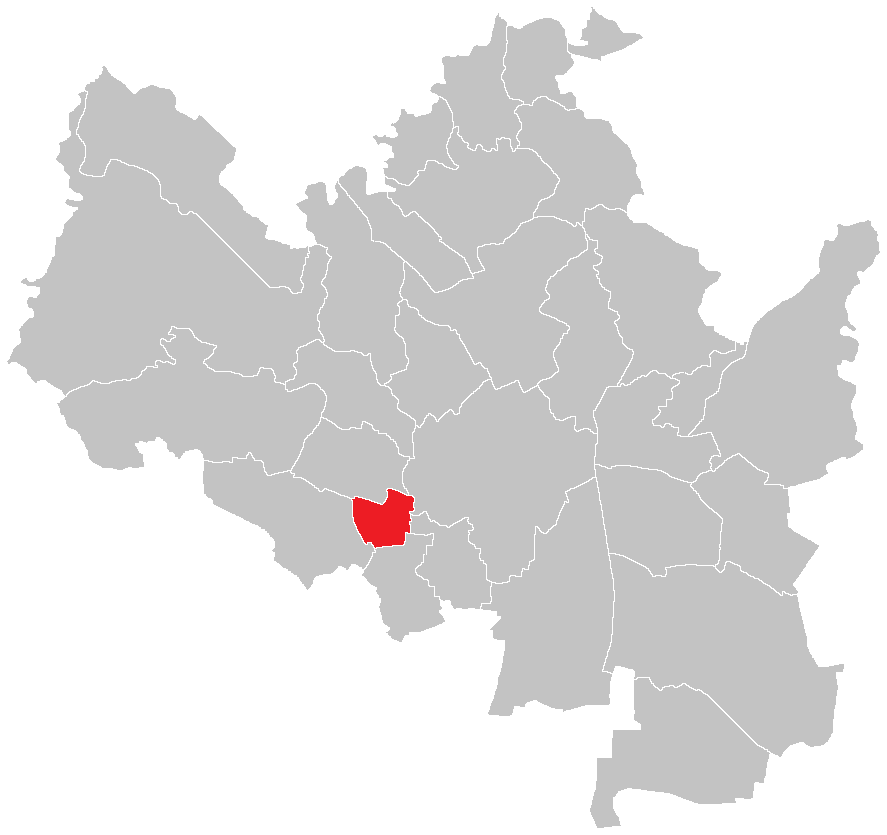
- Location of Brno-Nový Lískovec in Brno 49°10′40″N 16°33′34″E
- Country: Czech Republic
- Region: South Moravian Region
- City: Brno

Government
  - Mayor: Jana Drápalová (Zelení)

Area
  - Total: 1.65 km^{2} (0.64 sq mi)

Population (2023)
  - Total: 10,434
  - Density: 6,320/km^{2} (16,400/sq mi)
- Time zone: UTC+1 (CET)
  - Summer (DST): UTC+2 (CEST)
- Postal code: 634 00
- Website: https://www.novy-liskovec.cz/

Brno-Nový Lískovec is one of the 29 city districts of Brno, Czech Republic, located in the southwestern part of the city. It consists of the municipal part and cadastral territory of Nový Lískovec (German: Neu Leskau, lit. 'New Lískovec'), along with a small uninhabited part of Starý Lískovec, originally parts of the municipality of Lískovec, with which it was annexed to Brno in 1919. The total cadastral area is 1.65 km². The city district was established on November 24, 1990. About 10,000 people live here.

Brno-Nový Lískovec is adjacent to the district of Brno-Starý Lískovec in the south and southeast. For the purposes of the senate elections, Brno-Nový Lískovec is included in electoral district number 59 of the Brno-City District.

== History ==
=== The oldest settlement and Middle Ages ===
The advantageous location of Nový Lískovec at the foot of Kamenný vrch has attracted prehistoric man to permanent settlement since the early Stone Age. During the construction of the panel housing estate in 1978, during the construction of the western highway feeder in 1971 and the "Prague Radials" in 1989, a large number of documents were found of extensive settlements of the linear pottery culture and Moravian painted ceramics, the Jordanian culture from the beginning of the late Stone Age, and Jevišovice culture from the early Iron Age. A ditch delimiting the settlement of the oldest farmers was also found here. In 1978, during the construction of roads and a panel housing estate, 10 settlement pits with traces of the linear pottery culture were discovered. In the same locality, a buried object of the Jordanian culture was also found. In the Middle Ages, with a high probability of the territory of Nový Lískovec, the settlement of Rybníky, permanently belonging to the provostship in Komárov, was located in the place of today's Rybnická street. The settlement disappeared as a result of the Hussite or Czech-Hungarian wars. The land here was then used by subjects from Staré Brno, Nové Sady, Trnítá, Komárov, Horní Heršpice, Bohunice, Lískovec and Bosonohy. In 1528, the last provost of Komárov handed over this desolate settlement to the chapter of St. Peter in Brno.

=== 19th Century to the 1970s ===
The modern cadastre of Nový Lískovec was originally mainly part of the cadastres of the municipalities of Lískovec and Bohunice; a small part in the southwest (310 m²) belonged to Bosonohy. Before the creation of Nový Lískovec, orchards and vineyards were located on its territory. The beginnings of the settlement of today's Nový Lískovec date back to 1894, when Antonín Hrazdíra, a carpenter from Blanen, built a house here without the knowledge of the village of Lískovec. In 1896, after negotiations, he obtained an additional building permit. Soon, more houses began to be added here, but only in the part that then belonged to Lískovec, while the originally Bohunice part was not built until 1919, because the municipality of Bohunice at that time did not want to allow construction there. The first proposals for the name of the newly emerging settlement, popularly called Lískovečky, included Malý Lískovec, Tišlerky or Lískáček.

In 1906, the builder Uherka, in cooperation with the businessman Bílek and other companies, began to build more houses here. Germans from Brno showed the greatest interest in housing here. Therefore, in the same year, several Czech residents founded a local branch of National Unity for Southwestern Moravia in order to defend against the Germanisation of Nový Lískovec. A school was opened here in 1907. In 1910, the settlement already had 117 houses with 568 inhabitants. A significant moment for Nový Lískovec was the construction of the connecting road between Pisárky and Jihlavská road in the years 1911–1914.

On April 16, 1919, the villages of Lískovec and Bohunice were annexed to Brno, which lifted the building restrictions in the Bohunice part. After that, the development of Nový Lískovec also extended to the northwest of the original Bohunice cadastre. In the 1930s, the construction of the two-story "semi-detached houses" was completed. During World War II, the following inhabitants of Nový Lískovec died or were executed by the Gestapo: Oldřich Dvořák, Stanislav Kluch, Františka Kluchová, František Kluch, Vladimír Kluch, Vladislav Podsedník, Jindřich Škoda, Josef Zoubek, Petr Křivka and Leopold Herman. At the end of World War II, during the liberation of Nový Lískovec, which began on April 25, 1945, 51 houses were heavily damaged and 91 houses were lightly damaged. A number of the residents of Nový Lískovec were also illegally convicted by the communist regime. Most of the modern cadastre of Nový Lískovec and Starý Lískovec formed a common cadastre until the 1960s, when the cadastral territory of Nový Lískovec was created by separating the northern part of Lískovec and the northwestern part of the original Bohunice cadastre. The new border between Nový and Starý Lískovec measured 1.63 km.

=== Rest of the 20th Century ===
In 1975, construction of panel buildings began in Nový Lískovec, which also extended to the then lands of Starý Lískovec. For that reason, it was proposed to shift the border between the two cadastres in a southern direction to the northern edge of the road on Jihlavská street, whereby the cadastre of Nový Lískovec, at the expense of Starý Lískovec, was to be significantly increased from the original almost 1.13 km to almost 1.66 km, and the border between the two cadastres should be shortened to 1.02 km. On September 11, 1979, this proposal was discussed with the Department of Internal Affairs of the National Committee of the City of Brno and a representative of the company of Brnoprojekt. This proposal was subsequently discussed and approved on November 8, 1979 by the council of the District National Committee Brno I. On November 29, 1979, this proposal was also approved at a meeting of the council of the National Committee of the city of Brno. Subsequently, the entire border change was implemented. Land that belonged to Bosonohy until the 1960s and then passed to Starý Lískovec became part of the cadastre of Nový Lískovec during this modification. Since 1985, Kamenný vrch, the last panel housing estate in Brno, has been built mainly on land re-registered from Starý Lískovec.

On November 24, 1990, Nový Lískovec became one of the 29 newly established city districts under the name Brno-Nový Lískovec. In the years 1995–1996, the Pisarecký tunnel was dug in the northeast of Nový Lískovec.

=== 21st Century ===
On February 28, 2002, another change of the border with Starý Lískovec came into force at the northern edge of the road on Jihlavská street, when 23 m², located under the southern part of the building with the Nový Lískovec descriptive number 441, passed from Starý Lískovec to Nový Lískovec.

To another minor change in the administrative boundary of the Brno-Nový Lískovec and Brno-Starý Lískovec districts in 2012, when the marginal part of the Nový Lískovec cadastral area was transferred to the territory of the Brno-Starý Lískovec district, which in turn transferred a small marginal part of the Starý Lískovec cadastral area.

In 2020, the mayor of this district, Jana Drápalová, received the Josef Vavroušek Award for an exceptional achievement for the environment. The jury praised her for her efforts to transform the Nový Lískovec panel housing estate into an ecologically responsible part of the city. Jana Drápalová lobbied for the reconstruction of panel houses to a low-energy standard, the construction of anti-erosion elements, waterlogging sites and the planting of new greenery. The Pod Plachtami park was also created, the center of which is a lake into which rainwater from the surrounding panel houses is diverted. Drápalová has been gradually promoting these changes since the 1990s.

=== Changes in administrative jurisdiction ===
- Until 1945, the territory of Nový Lískovec belonged to Lískovec and Bohunice
- 1945–1946 – The local committee (MNV) of Nový Lískovec operated in Nový Lískovec.
- 1947–1949 – The entire territory of Nový Lískovec was part of the Brno II municipal district.
- 1949–1954 – The entire territory of Nový Lískovec was part of the Brno V municipal district.
- 1954–1957 – Most of the territory of the modern Nový Lískovec cadastre was part of the Brno I municipal district, the southeastern part of the modern cadastre was part of the Brno VIII municipal district.
- 1957–1960 – Administrative jurisdiction the same as in the previous period, only the name Brno VIII was changed to Brno VIII-Bohunice.
- 1960–1971 – That part of Nový Lískovec that belonged to the cadastral territory of Lískovec (most of the territory of Nový Lískovec) became part of the Bohunice district; the smaller eastern part, belonging to the Bohunice cadastre, remained part of the Brno I municipal district.
- 1971–1990 – The entire territory of the Nový Lískovec cadastral area created in the 1960s is part of the Brno I district. The originally undeveloped southern part of today's Nový Lískovec, which belonged to Starý Lískovec until the end of the 1970s, was, on the other hand, part of the Brno-Bohunice district until 1976, originally called Brno VIII. Bohunice.
- Since 1990 – The entire territory of the Nový Lískovec cadastral area forms the city district of Brno-Nový Lískovec.

=== District symbols ===
In 1998, the symbols of the district were approved by the Brno council - the coat of arms and flag, consisting of red and white stripes and a blue quarter with three hazelnuts. In 2017, the symbols were revised, and in 2018, the Chairman of the Chamber of Deputies of the Czech Republic, Radek Vondráček, decided to award them to the city district.

Crest Blazon: In a gules shield with argent tapered head and argent crossbar azure quartered, within it on a pendulous stem three (2.1) inverted hazelnuts, all gold.

Description of the flag: The sheet consists of four horizontal stripes, white, red, white and red, in the ratio 1:2:2:2, with a blue square, in it three (2.1) reversed hazelnuts on a drooping stem, all yellow. The ratio of the width to the length of the leaf is 2:3.

== Character ==
The urban district of Brno-Nový Lískovec, located at the foot of Kamenný vrch, consists of three different parts from an urban point of view, the original Nový Lískovec in the north, consisting mainly of family houses, the Nový Lískovec panel housing estate in the south and the Kamenný Vrch panel housing in the southwest. From the development of the cadastral territory of Starý Lískovec, only the southern edge of the collective garages on Jihlavská street belongs to the town district, otherwise it is only the road on Jihlavská street together with local bus stops, as well as several turns to other roads and several sidewalks. Nový Lískovec generally belongs to the largest panel housing estates in Brno. The Kamenný vrch nature reserve extends to the north of Nový Lískovec, valuable above all for the steppe vegetation and especially for the occurrence of the protected large-flowered coneflower.

== Territorial divisions ==
The cadastral territory of Nový Lískovec is further divided into 3 basic settlement units, while the part of Starý Lískovec in this district is divided into 1, marked in italics.

Basic settlement unit	Population		
Basic settlement unit	2011	2021	Change
Nový Lískovec-sever	1,153	1,037	-10.1%
Nový Lískovec-jih	3,107	2,903	-6.6%
Kamenný vrch	7,089	6,344	-10.5%
Mezi Lískovci-Jihlavská	-	0	-

== Demographics ==
Historical population
Year	Pop.	±%
1910	530	—
1930	741	+39.8%
1961	1,141	+54.0%
1970	1,067	−6.5%
1980	1,094	+2.5%
1991	5,738	+424.5%
2001	11,400	+98.7%
2011	11,349	−0.4%
2021	10,284	−9.4%
Source: Censuses

As of the 2021 census, the population is 10,284, down 9% from 11,349 in the 2011 census. The population peaked at 11,400 in 2001.

== Transport ==
The transport connection with the rest of the city is provided by the Public Transport Company of the City of Brno via trolleybus lines No. 26, which connects Nový Lískovec and Líšeň, and No. 37, which provides a connection between the Bohunice Hospital and Mendl Square. The transport connection is also provided by bus line No. 50, which connects the Komárov district and the Brno-Bystrc district, and at night by lines N95 and N90.
