= Administrative divisions of Brno =

Districts in the Czech Republic

The city of Brno is divided into 29 city districts, which are further subdivided into 48 cadastral territories.

== Map ==
1. Brno-Bohunice
2. Brno-Bosonohy
3. Brno-Bystrc
4. Brno-Černovice
5. Brno-Chrlice
6. Brno-Ivanovice
7. Brno-Jehnice
8. Brno-jih
9. Brno-Jundrov
10. Brno-Kníničky
11. Brno-Kohoutovice
12. Brno-Komín
13. Brno-Královo Pole
14. Brno-Líšeň
15. Brno-Maloměřice and Obřany
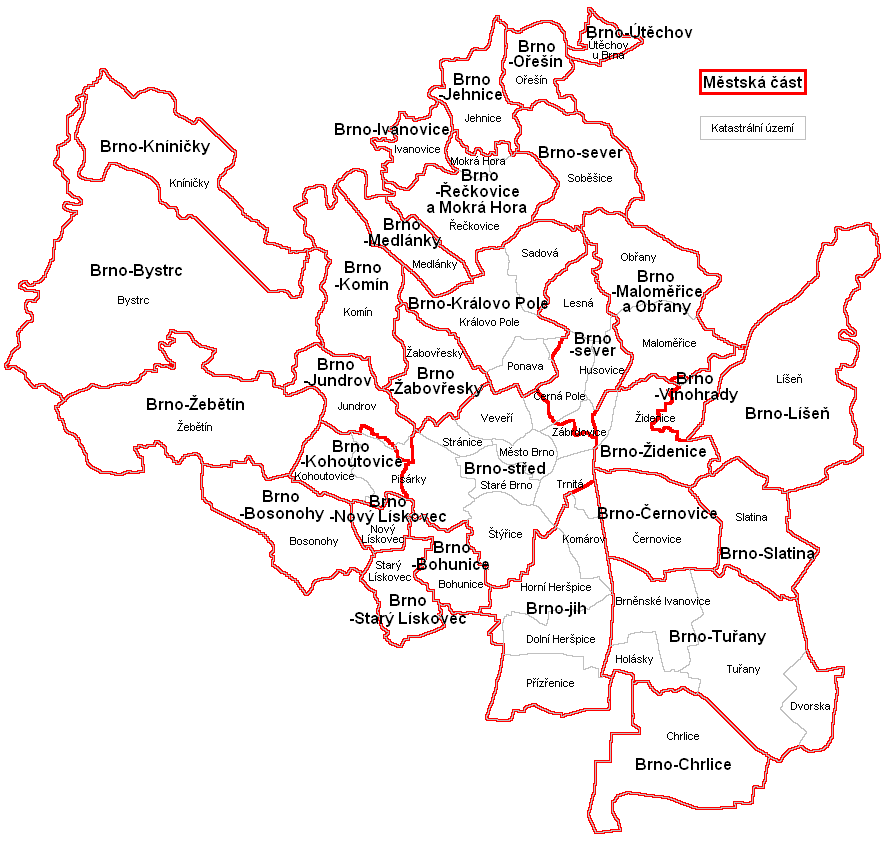
16. Brno-Medlánky
17. Brno-Nový Lískovec
18. Brno-Ořešín
19. Brno-Řečkovice a Mokrá Hora
20. Brno-sever
21. Brno-Slatina
22. Brno-Starý Lískovec
23. Brno-střed
24. Brno-Tuřany
25. Brno-Útěchov
26. Brno-Vinohrady
27. Brno-Žabovřesky
28. Brno-Žebětín
29. Brno-Židenice

== City districts ==
City district	Population (2023)	Area (km^{2)}	Density	Postal code	Basic settlement units
Brno-střed	69,258	15.00	4,617	602 00, 603 00	47
Brno-sever	50,053	12.24	4,089	602 00, 613 00, 614 00, 638 00	23
Brno-Královo Pole	30,555	9.91	3,083	602 00, 612 00	21
Brno-Líšeň	27,234	15.71	1,733	628 00	15
Brno-Bystrc	24,655	27.26	905	635 00-641 00	13
Brno-Židenice	23,042	5.05	4,562	615 00, 636 00	15
Brno-Žabovřesky	21,508	4.35	4,944	616 00	12
Brno-Řečkovice a Mokrá Hora	15,029	7.57	1,985	621 00	13
Brno-Bohunice	13,671	3.02	4,526	625 00	5
Brno-Starý Lískovec	12,966	3.28	3,953	625 00	5
Brno-Kohoutovice	12,830	4.09	3,136	623 00	5
Brno-Slatina	12,577	5.83	2,157	627 00	8
Brno-Vinohrady	12,343	1.96	6,297	628 00	2
Brno-jih	10,502	12.77	822	602 00-619 00	18
Brno-Nový Lískovec	10,434	1.65	6,323	625 00, 634 00	3
Brno-Černovice	8,490	6.29	1,349	618 00	9
Brno-Komín	8,024	7.60	1,055	624 00	9
Brno-Maloměřice and Obřany	6,253	9.29	673	614 00	11
Brno-Tuřany	5,947	17.84	333	620 00	9
Brno-Medlánky	5,865	3.51	1,670	621 00	5
Brno-Žebětín	5,757	13.59	423	641 00	4
Brno-Jundrov	4,725	4.22	1,119	637 00	7
Brno-Chrlice	3,691	9.49	388	643 00	4
Brno-Bosonohy	2,832	7.15	396	642 00	3
Brno-Ivanovice	1,994	2.45	813	621 00	2
Brno-Kníničky	1,140	10.93	104	635 00	6
Brno-Jehnice	1,136	4.07	279	621 00	1
Brno-Útěchov	853	1.18	722	644 00	1
Brno-Ořešín	638	3.06	208	621 00	1

== Cadastral territories ==
Cadastral territory	City district	Population (2021)	Area (km^{2)}	Density
Židenice	Brno-Židenice, Brno-Vinohrady	33,072	6.47	5,111
Líšeň	Brno-Líšeň	26,266	15.71	1,671
Bystrc	Brno-Bystrc	24,714	27.26	906
Žabovřesky	Brno-Žabovřesky	21,262	4.35	4,887
Královo Pole	Brno-Královo Pole	21,119	5.50	3,839
Veveří	Brno-střed	20,467	1.98	10,336
Černá Pole	Brno-Královo Pole, Brno-sever, Brno-střed	20,412	2.46	8,297
Staré Brno	Brno-střed	17,640	1.68	10,500
Lesná	Brno-sever	15,981	2.58	6,194
Řečkovice	Brno-Řečkovice a Mokrá Hora	14,262	6.68	2,135
Bohunice	Brno-Bohunice	14,212	3.02	4,705
Starý Lískovec	Brno-Starý Lískovec	12,782	3.28	3,896
Zábrdovice	Brno-sever, Brno-střed, Brno-Židenice	12,632	1.64	7,702
Kohoutovice	Brno-Kohoutovice	11,573	2.38	4,862
Slatina	Brno-Slatina	11,104	5.83	1,904
Nový Lískovec	Brno-Nový Lískovec	10,284	1.65	6,232
Štýřice	Brno-střed	8,665	3.33	2,602
Černovice	Brno-Černovice	8,374	6.29	1,331
Komín	Brno-Komín	7,984	7.60	1,050
Husovice	Brno-sever	6,915	1.32	5,238
Ponava	Brno-Královo Pole	6,817	1.60	4,260
Žebětín	Brno-Žebětín	6,222	13.59	457
Medlánky	Brno-Medlánky	6,103	3.51	1,738
Brno-město	Brno-střed	5,300	1.19	4,453
Komárov	Brno-jih	4,988	1.66	3,004
Stránice	Brno-střed	4,552	0.93	4,894
Jundrov	Brno-Jundrov, Brno-Kohoutovice	4,458	4.15	1,074
Trnitá	Brno-jih, Brno-střed	4,429	1.90	2,331
Chrlice	Brno-Chrlice	3,613	9.49	380
Maloměřice	Brno-Maloměřice and Obřany	3,363	4.06	828
Obřany	Brno-Maloměřice and Obřany	3,014	5.28	570
Tuřany	Brno-Tuřany	2,671	9.61	277
Pisárky	Brno-Jundrov, Brno-Kohoutovice, Brno-střed	2,606	4.67	558
Bosonohy	Brno-Bosonohy	2,602	7.15	363
Soběšice	Brno-sever	2,494	6.06	411
Horní Heršpice	Brno-jih	2,114	3.77	560
Ivanovice	Brno-Ivanovice	1,997	2.45	815
Sadová	Brno-Královo Pole	1,858	2.82	658
Brněnské Ivanovice	Brno-Tuřany	1,481	4.17	355
Přízřenice	Brno-jih	1,186	3.82	310
Holásky	Brno-Tuřany	1,142	1.83	624
Kníničky	Brno-Kníničky	1,105	10.93	101
Jehnice	Brno-Jehnice	1,090	4.07	267
Útěchov	Brno-Útěchov	920	1.18	779
Mokrá Hora	Brno-Řečkovice a Mokrá Hora	865	0.88	982
Dolní Heršpice	Brno-jih	813	3.13	259
Ořešín	Brno-Ořešín	607	3.06	198
Dvorska	Brno-Tuřany	380	2.23	170
