= Brno-Komín =

- City District of Brno
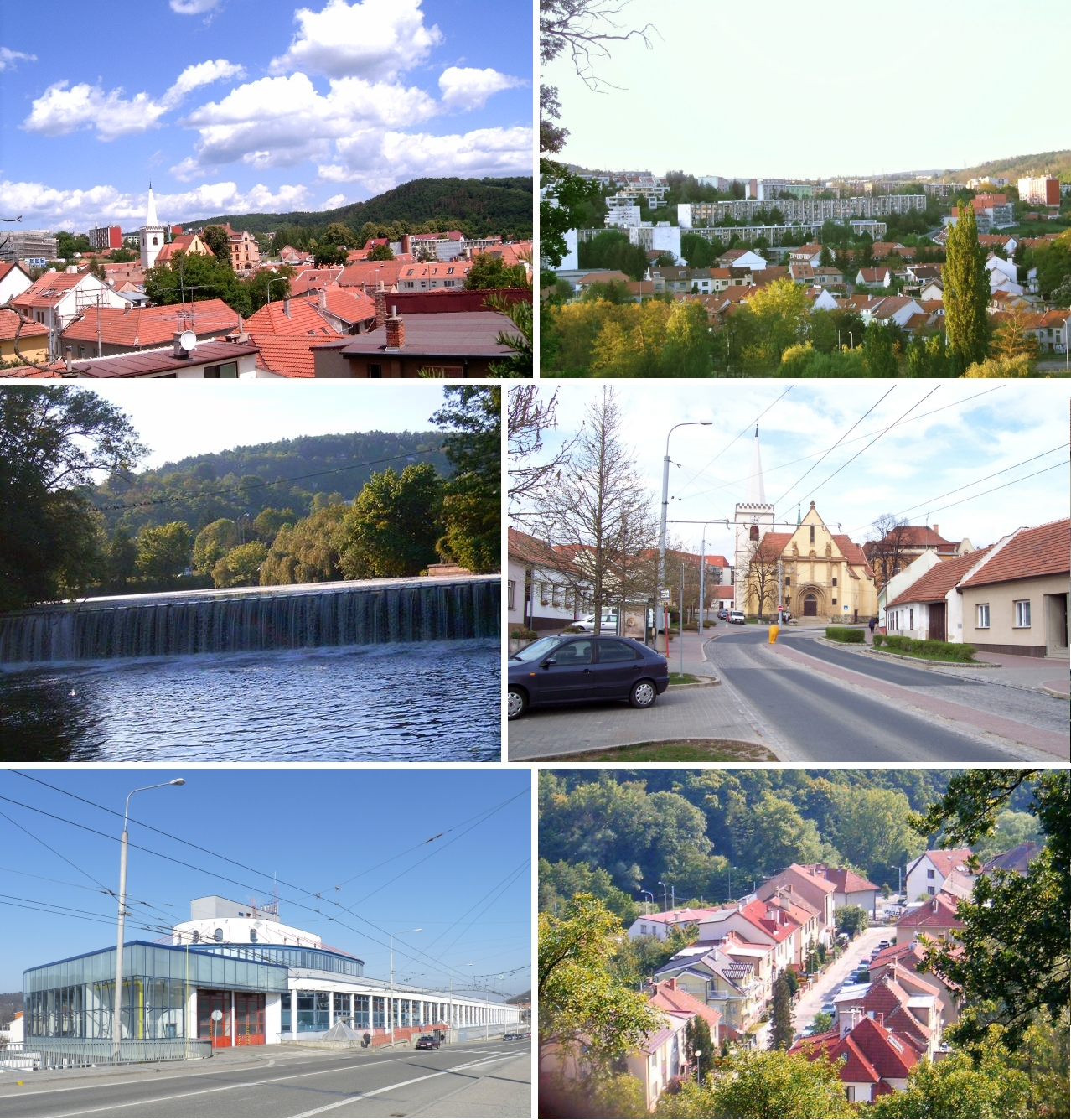

- Flag Coat of arms

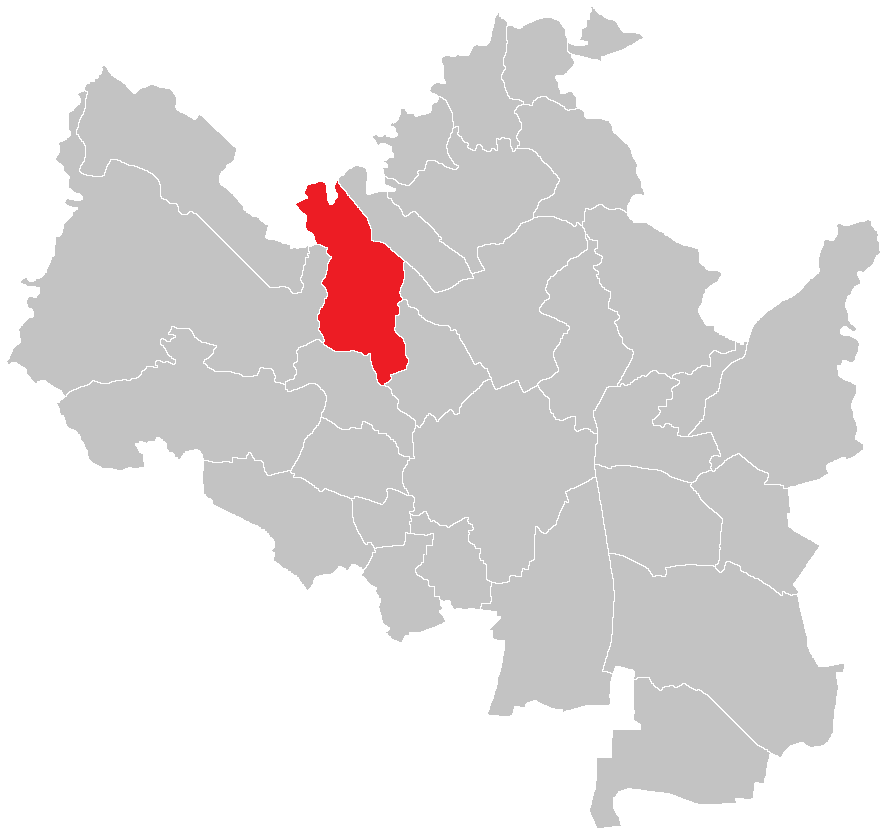
- Location of Brno-Komín in Brno 49°13′14″N 16°33′15″E
- Country: Czech Republic
- Region: South Moravian Region
- City: Brno

Government
  - Mayor: Milada Blatná (Zelení)

Area
  - Total: 7.60 km^{2} (2.93 sq mi)

Population (2023)
  - Total: 8,024
  - Density: 1,060/km^{2} (2,730/sq mi)
- Time zone: UTC+1 (CET)
  - Summer (DST): UTC+2 (CEST)
- Postal code: 624 00
- Website: https://www.brno-komin.cz/

Brno-Komín is a city district in Brno, Czech Republic, in the northwestern part of the city. It consists of the cadastral territory of Komín (German: Komein), originally an independent municipality that was annexed to Brno in 1919. Its cadastral territory has an area of 7.60 km^{2}. The city district was established on November 24, 1990. About 8,000 inhabitants live here.

For the purposes of the Senate elections, Brno-Komín is included in electoral district number 60 of the Brno-City District.

Komín has the character of a smaller town with clearly visible remains of the original village development. The Komín development is concentrated in the surroundings of the Svratka river and on the adjacent northern slopes, the rest of the cadastre area consists mainly of arable land, forests and also the Medlánky Airport runway system. The original village of Komín with the church of St. Vavřinec, which is closely connected to the local panel housing estate in the north.

== Etymology ==
The name of the settlement was derived from the personal name Koma, which was a domestic form of the name Komoň or Komolec. The meaning of the place name was Koma's property. The name of East Moravian Komně was also derived from a similar domestic form (probably Komen) of the same names. The connection of the name of the village with the common word Komín (lit. 'chimney') is not possible, because in the 13th century, when the name Komín is first documented (1240 in the form of Komyn), chimneys were not yet known in Moravia.

== Territorial divisions ==
The cadastral territory of Komín is further divided into 9 basic settlement units.

Basic settlement unit	Population		
Basic settlement unit	2011	2021	Change
Kristenova	873	770	-11.8%
Jundrovská	745	1,238	+66.2%
Bystrcká	559	561	+0.4%
Pastviny	1,297	1,349	+4.0%
U Svratky	14	16	+14.3%
Komínská Chochola	1	2	+100.0%
Komín-sever	3,947	3,990	+1.1%
Padělky	6	9	+50.0%
Netopýrky	15	49	+226.7%

== Demographics ==
As of the 2021 census, the population is 7,984, up 7% from 7,457 in the 2011 census. The population peaked at 8,180 in 1980.

Historical population

Year	Pop.	±%
1869	809	—
1880	931	+15.1%
1890	1,019	+9.5%
1900	1,319	+29.4%
1910	1,846	+40.0%

Year	Pop.	±%
1921	1,951	+5.7%
1930	2,317	+18.8%
1950	2,429	+4.8%
1961	2,262	−6.9%
1970	2,575	+13.8%

Year	Pop.	±%
1980	8,180	+217.7%
1991	7,827	−4.3%
2001	7,251	−7.4%
2011	7,457	+2.8%
2021	7,984	+7.1%

Source: Censuses
