= Vineyard track =

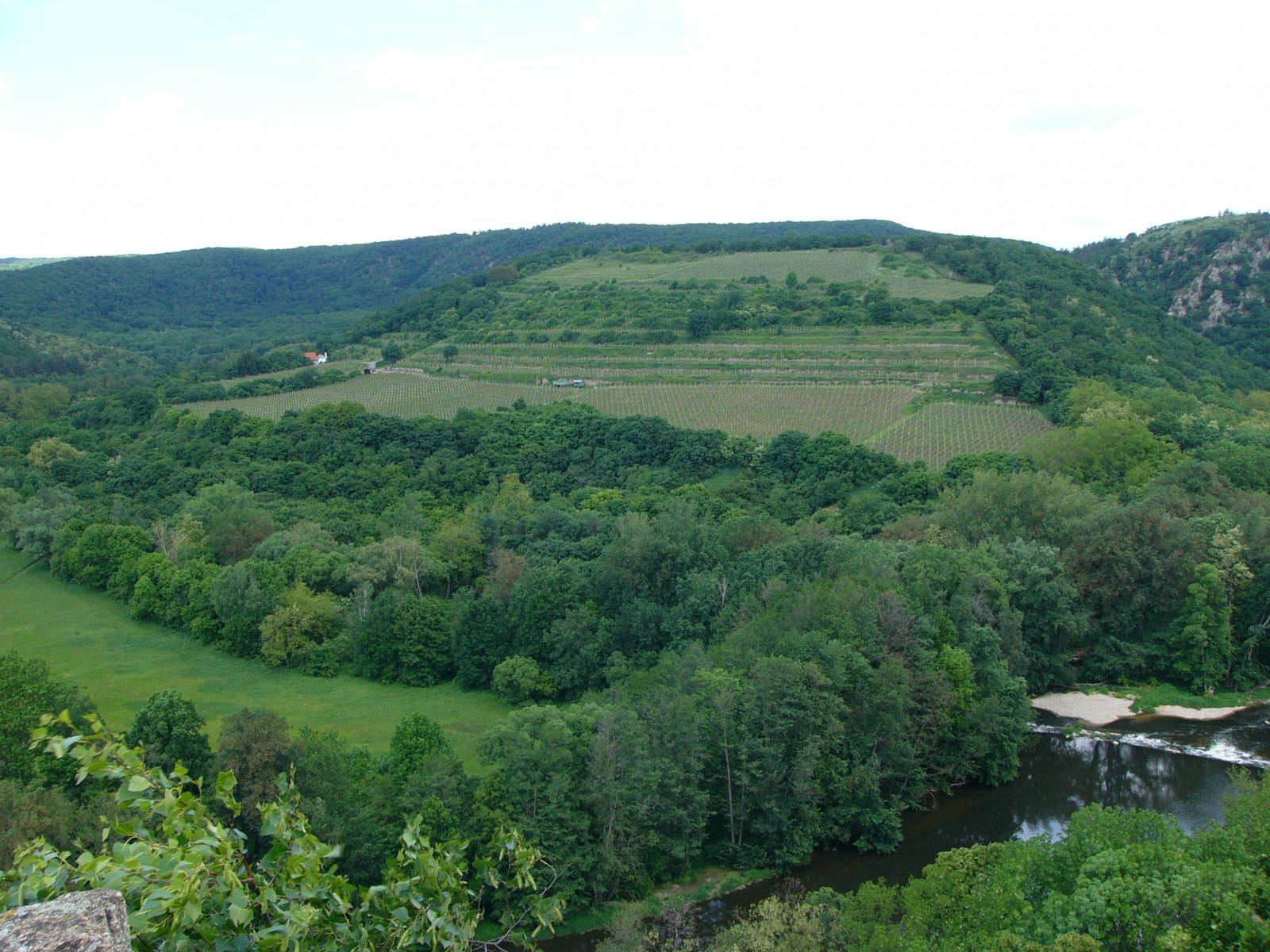
Šobes (or Šobes hill) is a well known vineyard location (vineyard track) in the Czech Republic

A vineyard track (Czech: viniční trať) is a term used in the legislature of the Czech Republic, meaning a site suitable for vineyards growing.

== Definition ==
By definition of the law no. 321/2004 of the Czech Republic, a vineyard track is an agricultural estate, part of an estate, set of estates, ensemble of an estate and a part of an estate or combination of estates, or parts of estate(s), representing a coherent complex/set within one vine-growing region (or sub-region), that is suitable for growing of vine due to its geographical location, incline, length of insolation and soil-climatical properties.

== The term ==
The term trať in the winemaking industry (that is a synonym for the English word "track"), primarily used in Czech as a term for 'railroad track', does not have anything to do with railway transportation at all, except for its default meaning.

=== Default meaning ===
The originating meaning 'railway track' (with the common meaning in Czech 'railroad section (a sub-set of rails) of the entire railway system specified in the timetable/schedule, having its own ID number, usually belonging to a specifically delimited (coherent) area, typically between a major railway junction where the track starts and a city/village, where the track ends in the last station/terminal, or a track interconnecting two major junctions to cover the settlements in between') is being used in the very same way for the description of a sub-set of vineyards.

=== Origin ===
In Czech countries, this usage of the word owes its origin most probably to the fact, that the most typical vine-training in Czech Republic is being aided by using trellising (as vine training), visually resembling (railway) "tracks" that belong together (form a coherent complex).

== Other countries ==
- German – Germany: the most equivalent term is Einzellage.
- German – Austria: The term is Riede.
- English/French: the most equivalent term is "Terroir", which however might have much broader meaning, not matching the originating definition.
