= Ostopovice =

- Municipality
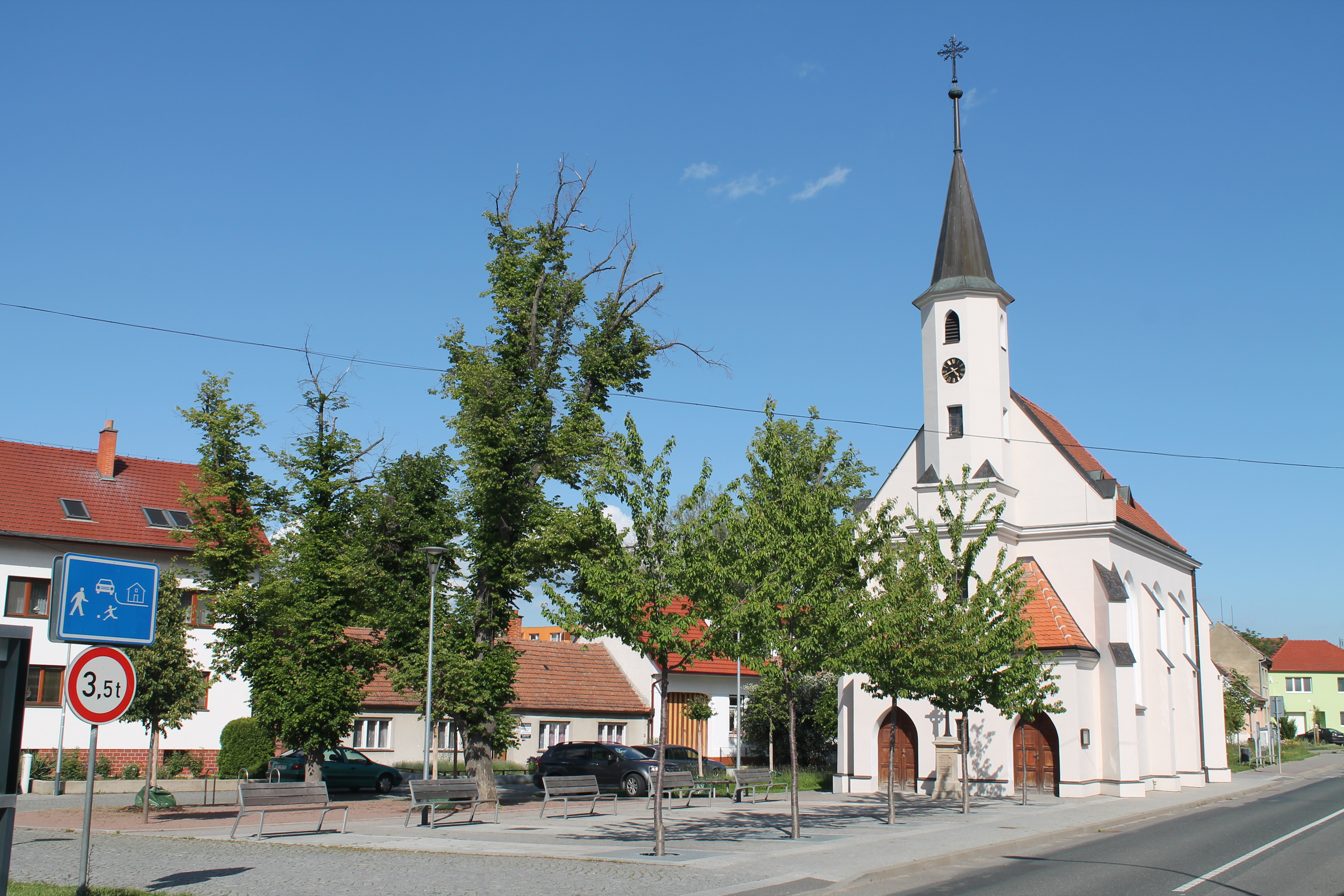
- Centre with Chapel of Saint John the Baptist

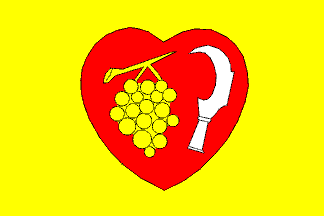
- Flag Coat of arms

- Location in the Czech Republic
- Coordinates: 49°9′40″N 16°32′44″E
- Country: Czech Republic
- Region: South Moravian
- District: Brno-Country
- First mentioned: 1237

Area
  - Total: 3.85 km^{2} (1.49 sq mi)
- Elevation: 245 m (804 ft)

Population (2026-01-01)
  - Total: 1,751
  - Density: 455/km^{2} (1,180/sq mi)
- Time zone: UTC+1 (CET)
  - Summer (DST): UTC+2 (CEST)
- Postal code: 664 49
- Website: www.ostopovice.cz

Ostopovice is a municipality and village in Brno-Country District in the South Moravian Region of the Czech Republic. It has about 1,800 inhabitants.

Ostopovice lies approximately 7 kilometres (4 mi) south-west of Brno and 185 km (115 mi) south-east of Prague.

== Demographics ==
Historical population
Year	Pop.	±%
1869	419	—
1880	428	+2.1%
1890	525	+22.7%
1900	606	+15.4%
1910	685	+13.0%
1921	689	+0.6%
1930	913	+32.5%
1950	847	−7.2%
1961	904	+6.7%
1970	1,041	+15.2%
1980	1,458	+40.1%
1991	1,376	−5.6%
2001	1,298	−5.7%
2011	1,544	+19.0%
2021	1,826	+18.3%
Source: Censuses
