= Sloupno (Hradec Králové District) =

- Municipality
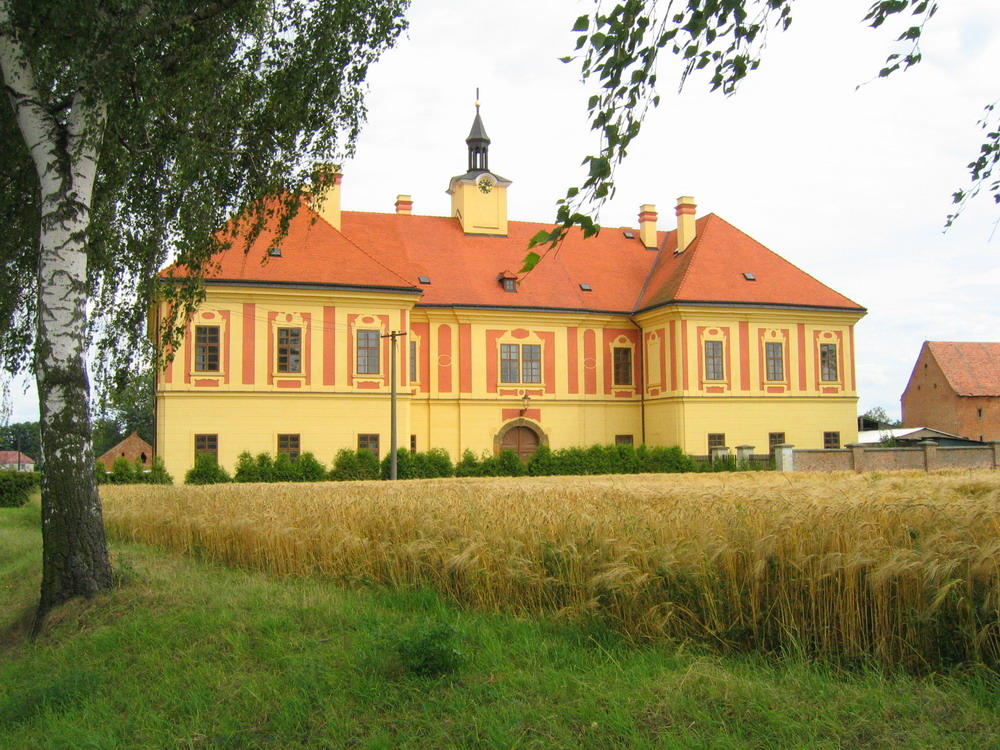
- Sloupno Castle

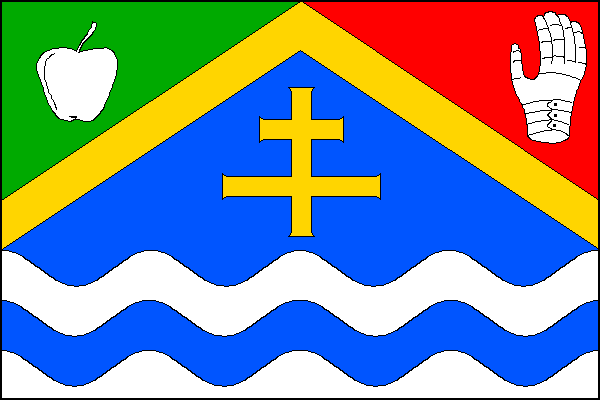
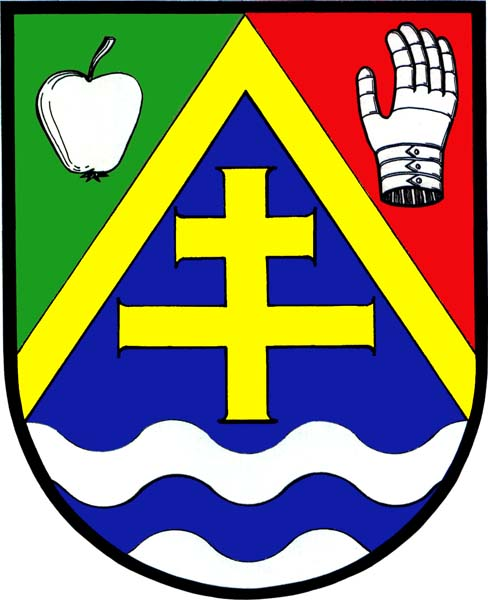
- Flag Coat of arms

- Location in the Czech Republic
- Coordinates: 50°15′27″N 15°30′7″E
- Country: Czech Republic
- Region: Hradec Králové
- District: Hradec Králové
- First mentioned: 1278

Area
  - Total: 4.51 km^{2} (1.74 sq mi)
- Elevation: 228 m (748 ft)

Population (2026-01-01)
  - Total: 540
  - Density: 120/km^{2} (310/sq mi)
- Time zone: UTC+1 (CET)
  - Summer (DST): UTC+2 (CEST)
- Postal code: 503 53
- Website: www.sloupno.cz

Sloupno is a municipality and village in Hradec Králové District in the Hradec Králové Region of the Czech Republic. It has about 500 inhabitants.

== Demographics ==
Historical population
Year	Pop.	±%
1869	620	—
1880	646	+4.2%
1890	696	+7.7%
1900	754	+8.3%
1910	859	+13.9%
1921	905	+5.4%
1930	891	−1.5%
1950	632	−29.1%
1961	626	−0.9%
1970	537	−14.2%
1980	499	−7.1%
1991	464	−7.0%
2001	494	+6.5%
2011	501	+1.4%
2021	491	−2.0%
Source: Censuses
