= Brno-Žebětín =

- City District of Brno
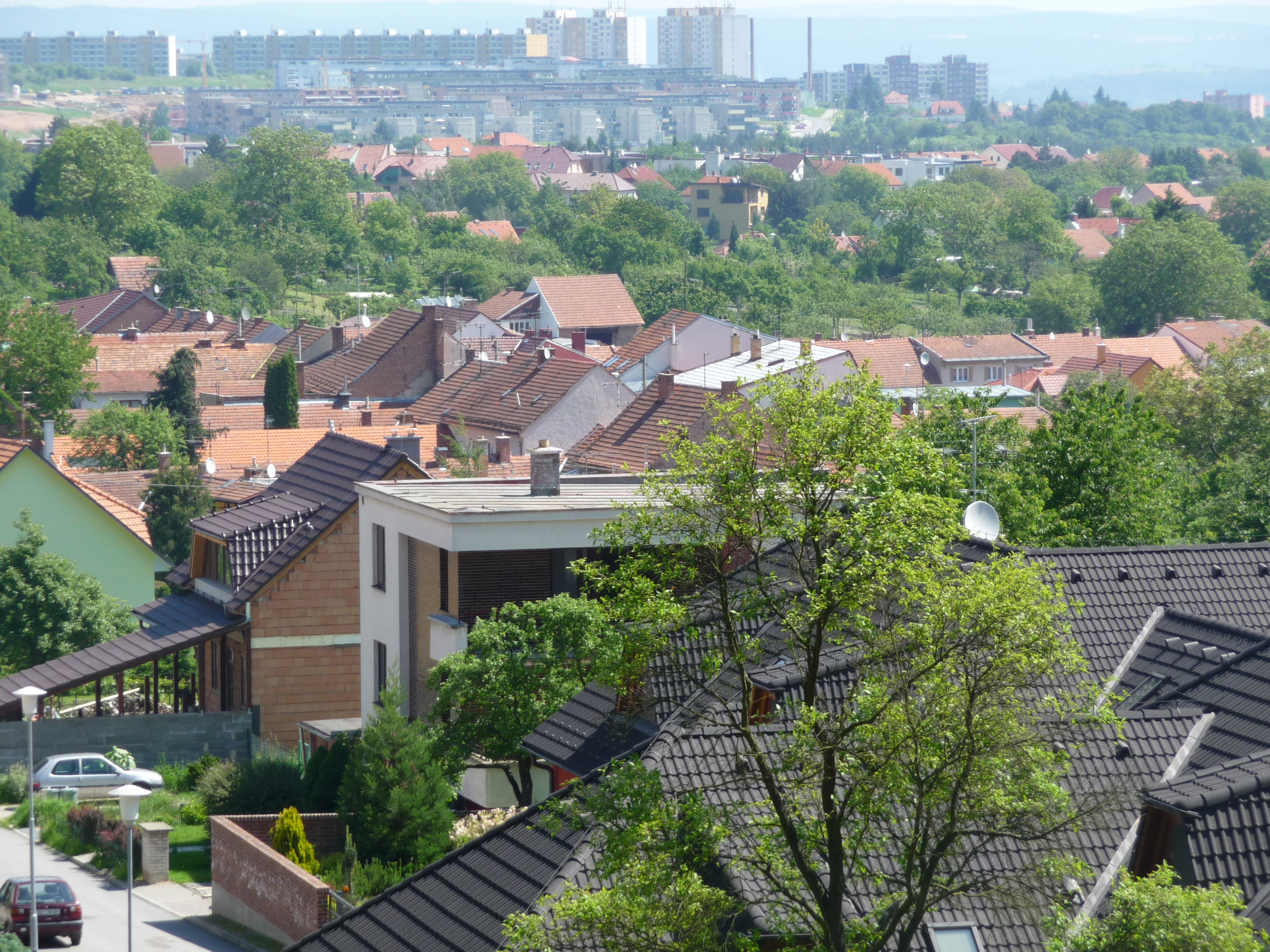
- View of Žebětín from the east

- Flag Coat of arms

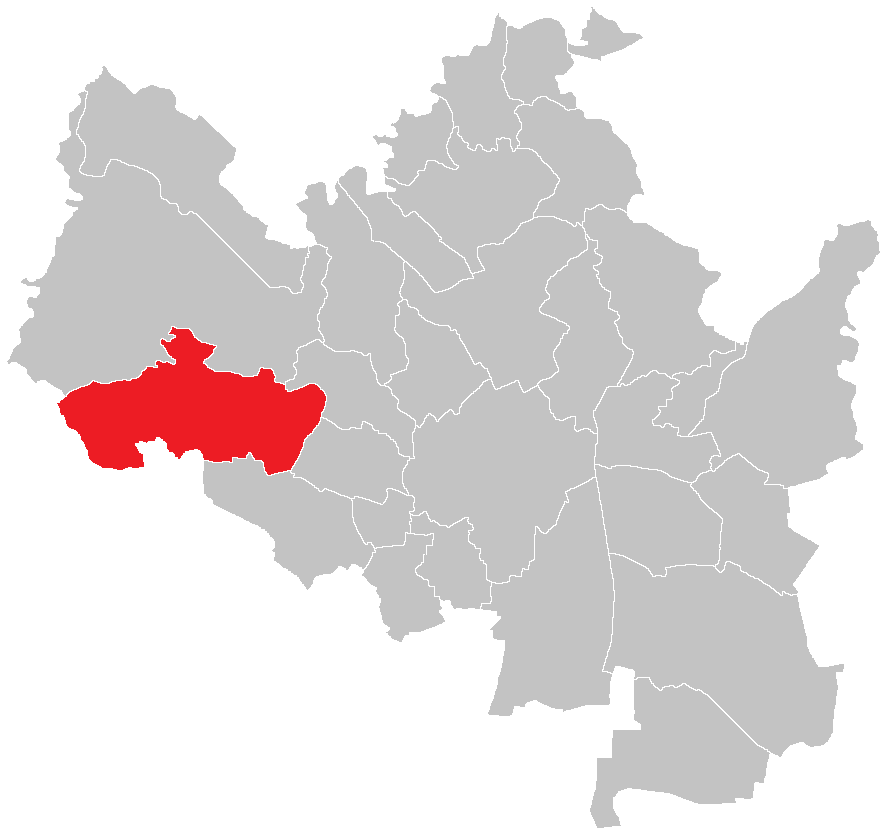
- Location of Brno-Žebětín in Brno 49°12′25″N 16°29′16″E
- Country: Czech Republic
- Region: South Moravian Region
- City: Brno

Government
  - Mayor: Vít Beran (KDU-ČSL)

Area
  - Total: 13.59 km^{2} (5.25 sq mi)

Population (2023)
  - Total: 5,757
  - Density: 423.6/km^{2} (1,097/sq mi)
- Time zone: UTC+1 (CET)
  - Summer (DST): UTC+2 (CEST)
- Postal code: 641 00
- Website: https://www.zebetin.cz/

Brno-Žebětín is a city district in Brno, Czech Republic, located on the western edge of the city. It consists of the municipal part and cadastral territory of Žebětín (German: Schebetein), originally an independent municipality that was annexed to Brno in 1971. It has an area of 13.60 km^{2}. The city district was established on November 24, 1990. About 6,000 people live here.

For the purposes of the senate elections, Brno-Žebětín is included in electoral district number 55 of Brno-City District.

== Etymology ==
The name of the village was derived from the male personal name Žeběta, whose older form Žabata was derived from the name Žába, identical to the Czech word for 'frog'. The meaning of the local name was "Žeběta's property".

== History ==
The oldest mention of the village of Žebětín dates from 1235 (Sebetin). From the Middle Ages until 1848, Žebětín was divided into 3 parts under different authorities, which then merged into one municipality. Žebětín was annexed to Brno on November 26, 1971. Then, until 1976, Žebětín with its entire territory formed an independent district with its own local national committee, which was first called Brno XVI-Žebětín, but as of May 1, 1972 was renamed Brno-Žebětín. From July 15, 1976 to November 23, 1990, Žebětín was part of the Brno II municipal district.

== Territorial divisions ==
The cadastral territory of Žebětín is further divided into 5 basic settlement units.

Basic settlement unit	Population		
Basic settlement unit	2011	2021	Change
Žebětín	3,574	4,126	+15.4%
Velká cena	0	0	+0%
Bešůvka	0	0	+0%
Farinova zatáčka	0	0	+0%
Kamechy-západ	3	2,096	+69,766.7%

== Demographics ==
The population has tripled since 2001 due to suburbanization and new housing developments.

Historical population

Year	Pop.	±%
1869	849	—
1880	904	+6.5%
1890	1,001	+10.7%
1900	1,202	+20.1%
1910	1,440	+19.8%

Year	Pop.	±%
1921	1,401	−2.7%
1930	1,554	+10.9%
1950	1,680	+8.1%
1961	1,843	+9.7%
1970	1,835	−0.4%

Year	Pop.	±%
1980	1,939	+5.7%
1991	1,872	−3.5%
2001	2,070	+10.6%
2011	3,577	+72.8%
2021	6,222	+73.9%

Source: Censuses
