= Brno-Bohunice =

- City District of Brno
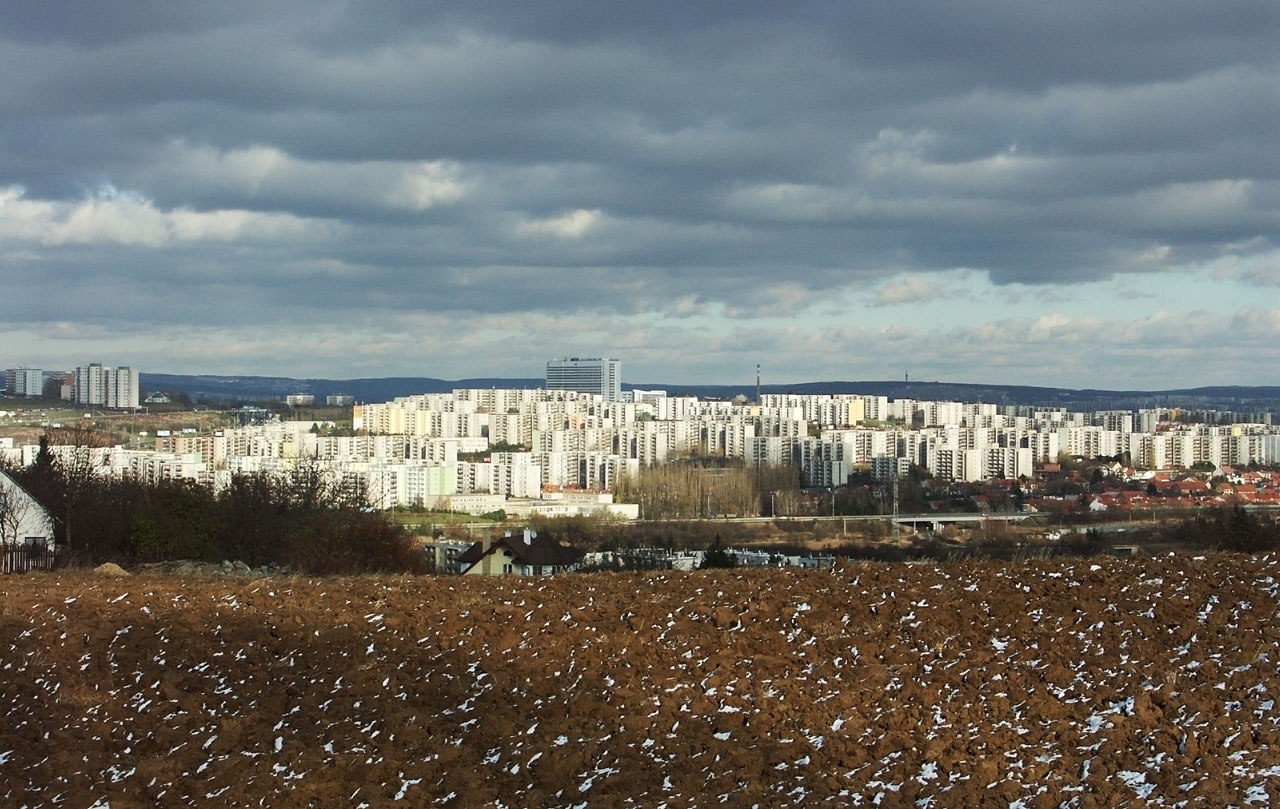
- Apartment flats in Brno-Bohunice viewed from the south

- Flag Coat of arms

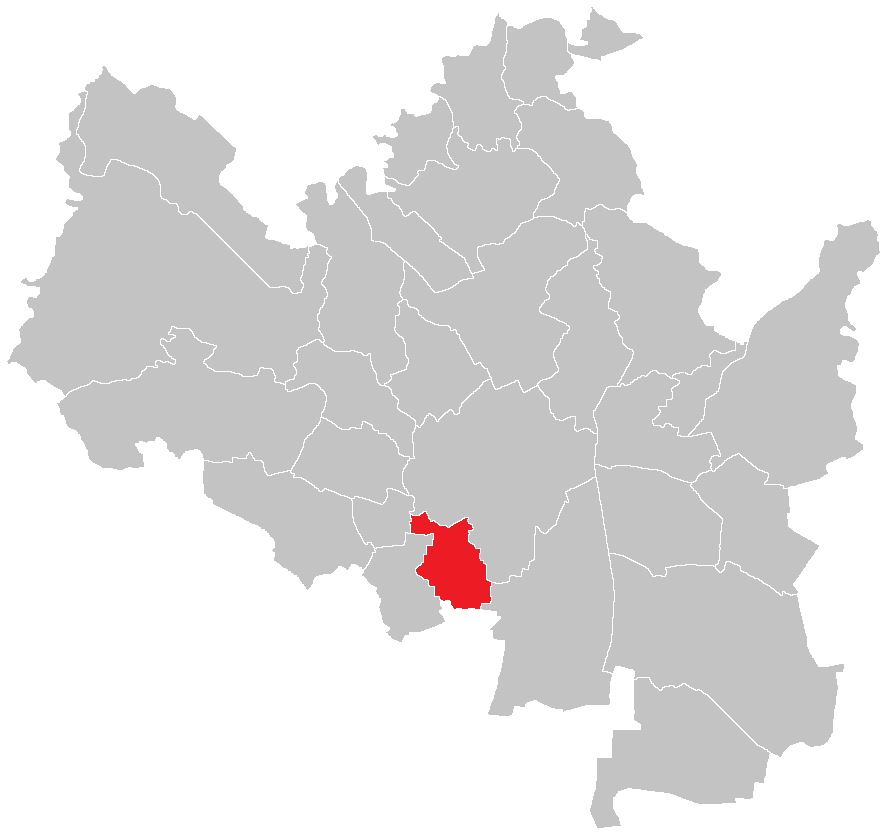
- Location of Bohunice in Brno 49°10′10″N 16°34′45″E
- Country: Czech Republic
- Region: South Moravia
- City: Brno

Government
  - Mayor: Lucie Stará (KDU-ČSL)

Area
  - Total: 3.02 km^{2} (1.17 sq mi)

Population (2023)
  - Total: 13,671
  - Density: 4,530/km^{2} (11,700/sq mi)
- Time zone: UTC+1 (CET)
  - Summer (DST): UTC+2 (CEST)
- Postal code: 625 00
- Website: https://www.brno-bohunice.cz/

Brno-Bohunice is a city district of Brno, the second largest city in the Czech Republic. It is made up of the cadastral territory of Bohunice.

It is located in the southwest part of the city. It is first mentioned in 1237. It began growing rapidly at the beginning of the 18th century. In 1919, Bohunice officially became part of Brno, which meant further growth. Street names first appeared in 1925. In 1921, Bohunice had 202 houses and 1463 inhabitants. Today's statistics show that Bohunice had about 614 houses with 14,212 inhabitants as of 2021.

Until 1975, Bohunice was just a small district at one end of the city of Brno, connected with the city center by a bus route. In the 1970s many housing developments were built, which increased the district's population to 13,000 by the end of the decade.

Today, there are several tram lines, bus lines and trolleybus lines, which serve the transport to and from the city center. On its eastern side it neighbors the major Brno graveyard, the Central Cemetery, and the western part neighbors the district of Starý Lískovec.

Today Bohunice is probably best known for its hospital: it is the largest hospital in Moravia and one of the biggest hospitals in the Czech Republic. Recently, the hospital area was expanded greatly and the faculty of science and engineering of Masaryk University was relocated here and is now known as the Univerzitní kampus. The entire complex, now named Campus, was then expanded even further by building a shopping mall and a TESCO nearby.

== Territorial divisions ==
The cadastral territory of Bohunice is further divided into 6 basic settlement units.

Basic settlement unit	Population		
Basic settlement unit	2011	2021	Change
Bohunice-střed	5,023	4,604	-8.3%
Ukrajinská	4,800	4,556	-5.1%
Okrouhlá	4,108	3,696	-10.0%
Pomologický ústav	215	213	-0.9%
Kejbaly	537	1,106	+106.0%
Červený kopec-jih	-	37	-

== Demographics ==
Historical population

Year	Pop.	±%
1869	435	—
1880	594	+36.6%
1890	891	+50.0%
1900	990	+11.1%
1910	1,436	+45.1%

Year	Pop.	±%
1921	1,463	+1.9%
1930	2,023	+38.3%
1950	2,882	+42.5%
1961	1,829	−36.5%
1970	1,816	−0.7%

Year	Pop.	±%
1980	13,329	+634.0%
1991	17,361	+30.2%
2001	16,398	−5.5%
2011	14,683	−10.5%
2021	14,212	−3.2%

Source: Censuses
