= Brno-City District =

Brno-City District Okres Brno-město
- District
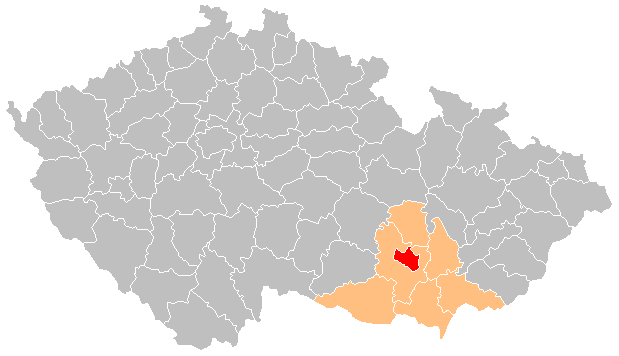
- Location in the South Moravian Region within the Czech Republic
- Coordinates: 49°13′N 16°35′E
- Country: Czech Republic
- Region: South Moravian
- Capital: Brno

Area
  - Total: 230.18 km^{2} (88.87 sq mi)

Population (2026)
  - Total: 404,296
  - Density: 1,756.4/km^{2} (4,549.1/sq mi)
- Time zone: UTC+1 (CET)
  - Summer (DST): UTC+2 (CEST)
- Municipalities: 1
- * Cities and towns: 1
- * Market towns: 0

Brno-City District (Czech: okres Brno-město) is a district in the South Moravian Region of the Czech Republic. The district is coterminous with the city of Brno.

== Geography ==
Brno-City District has a hilly and forested character in the northwestern part and flat and deforested in the southeastern part. On the border of these landscapes there is a large built-up area of the city. The territory extends into three geomorphological mesoregions: Bobrava Highlands (west and centre), Dyje–Svratka Valley (south and east), and Drahany Highlands (north). The highest point of the district is a contour line in Brno-Útěchov with an elevation of 497 m (1,631 ft), the northernmost point of the district. The lowest point is the river bed of the Svratka in Brno-Chrlice at 188 m (617 ft), the southernmost point of the district.

From the total district area of 230.2 km^{2} (88.9 sq mi), agricultural land occupies 75.0 km^{2} (29.0 sq mi), forests occupy 64.0 km^{2} (24.7 sq mi), and water area occupies 4.5 km^{2} (1.7 sq mi). Forests cover 27.8% of the district's area.

The Svratka River flows across the territory from west to south. The only notable body of water is the Brno Reservoir, built on the Svratka in the western part of the territory.

Small part of the Moravian Karst Protected Landscape Area extends into the district in the northeast.

== Demographics ==
Historical population

Year	Pop.	±%
1869	104,977	—
1880	120,122	+14.4%
1890	145,782	+21.4%
1900	176,645	+21.2%
1910	216,709	+22.7%

Year	Pop.	±%
1921	237,659	+9.7%
1930	283,972	+19.5%
1950	299,099	+5.3%
1961	324,173	+8.4%
1970	344,218	+6.2%

Year	Pop.	±%
1980	371,463	+7.9%
1991	388,296	+4.5%
2001	376,172	−3.1%
2011	385,913	+2.6%
2021	398,510	+3.3%

Source: Censuses
