= Brno-Ořešín =

- City District of Brno
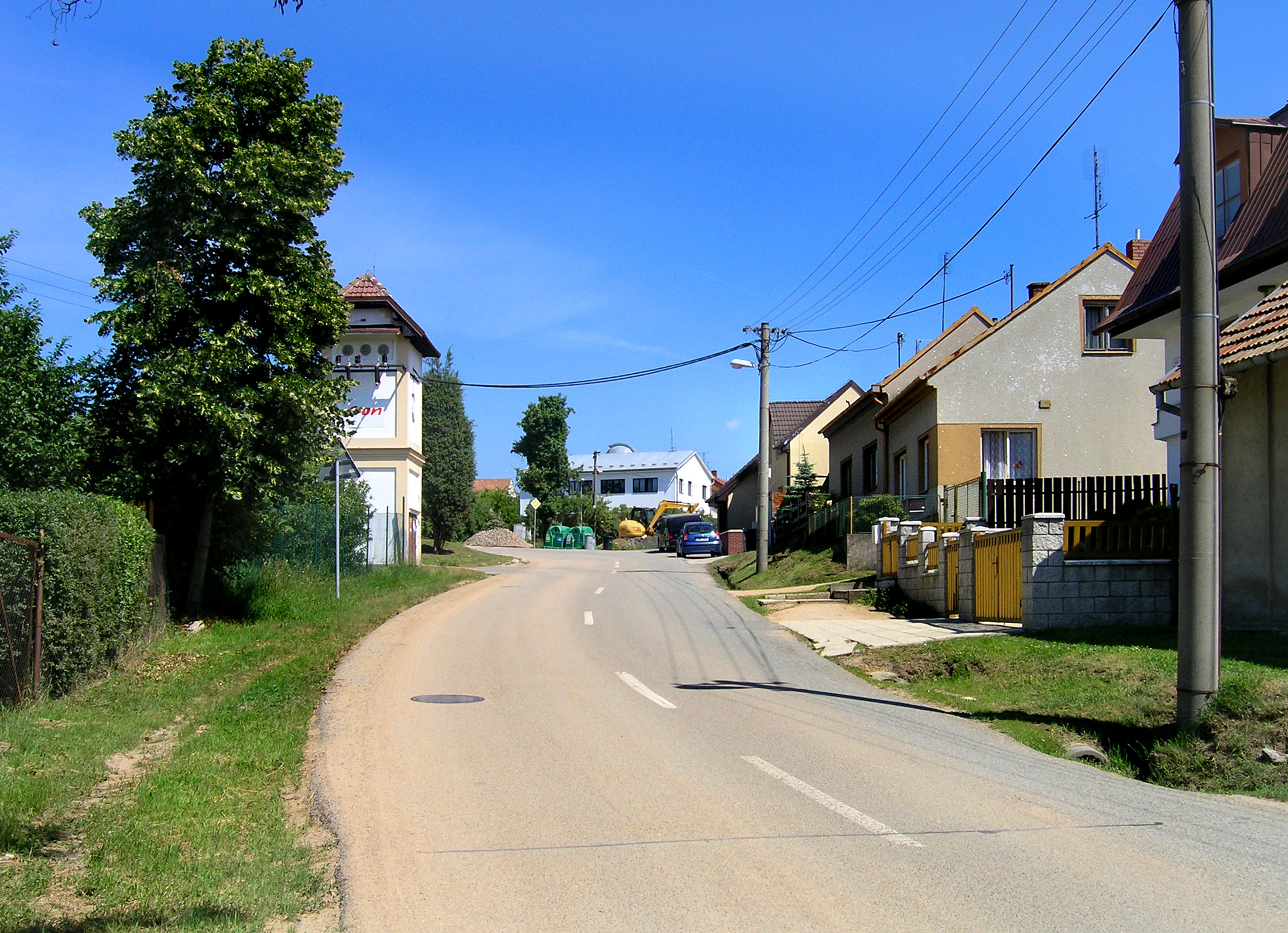
- Klimešova street

- Flag Coat of arms

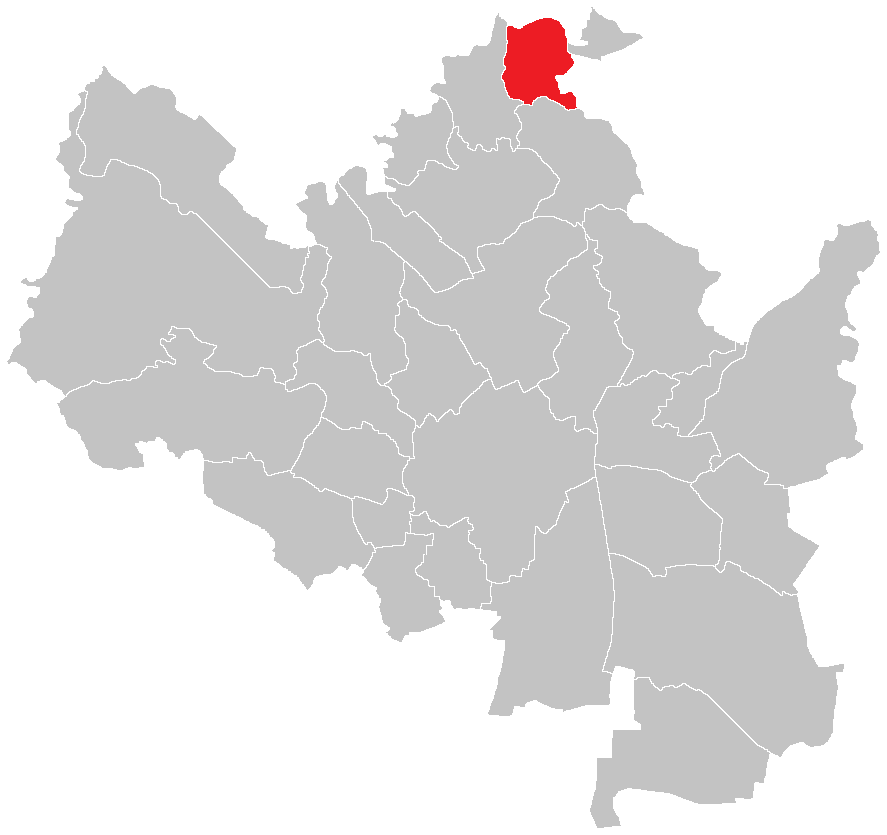
- Location of Brno-Ořešín in Brno
- Coordinates: 49°16′36″N 16°36′26″E
- Country: Czech Republic
- Region: South Moravian
- District: Brno-City
- City: Brno

Government
  - Mayor: Jan Levíček

Area
  - Total: 3.06 km^{2} (1.18 sq mi)

Population (2021)
  - Total: 607
  - Density: 198/km^{2} (514/sq mi)
- Time zone: UTC+1 (CET)
  - Summer (DST): UTC+2 (CEST)
- Postal code: 621 00
- Website: www.brno-oresin.cz

Brno-Ořešín is a city district on the northern edge of the city of Brno in the Czech Republic. It consists of the municipal part and cadastral territory of Ořešín, originally a municipality, which was annexed into Brno in 1971. It has 600 inhabitants in an area of 3.06 square kilometres (1.18 sq mi). It is the smallest city district of Brno in terms of population.

It is located on the southern slope of the Horka hill and its surroundings consist mainly of the forested area of the Soběšice uplands, which are used for tourism and recreation by the locals. The city district has a chapel and several small sights.

== Etymology ==
The basis of the local name Ořešín is based on the personal name Ořěch, or its variants Ořěšě or Ořěcha, to which the possessive suffix -ín was added. The name therefore means "Ořěch's village".

The village is first mentioned in 1275 under the name Horus, the origin of which is unclear. It may be a corruption of the word "ořech", there is also a possibility that it was an accidentally omitted letter in the Latin word "hortus", i.e. "garden". Other references already mention the name Ořešín, in many variants over the centuries. In 1327 the village is written as Oreschin, and three years later Ohresin or Ohrzechin. At the turn of the 17th and 18th centuries, the variants Woržessin, Oržessin and Woržeschin are documented, and during the 19th century, the Germanized versions Ořeschin and Orzeschin appear, as well as the Czech names Ořessjn, Ořešie, and for the first time in 1854, Ořešín. This variant was also used in the official determination of the village name in 1924. During the Protectorate, the name Orscheschin was used in German in the years 1939–1945.

== History ==
=== Before 1850 ===
East of Ořešín, in the Za žlíbek field track, there are quite a few unusual flint and chert fragments in the vicinity of the field track. The 1940 publication Vranov u Brna lists older Paleolithic finds from Ořešín; later a stone axe head, probably Neolithic, was found here. It is possible that a Paleolithic settlement was located here.

The first written mention of Ořešín, then referred to as Horus, dates back to 1275, when it is mentioned in a document according to which the village was to be temporarily held by Bambo, the administrator of the Moravian chamberlain Černín of Popovice, for a certain fee until his death. After his death, the village was to return to the property of the Premonstratensian monastery in Zábrdovice, which actually happened. However, the Zábrdovice convent was in debt and in 1327 sold Ořešín to the Cistercian nuns of Staré Brno, who used funds donated by their founder, Queen Eliška Rejčka, for this transaction. The village thus became part of the Stará Brno estate, where it remained until the mid-19th century. The nuns owned this property until the monastery was abolished in 1782; Ořešín was administered as part of their Cacovice estate. From the end of the 16th century, the village was headed by a vogt.

In 1657, after the Thirty Years' War, Ořešín consisted of nine homesteads, one of which, the local manor, was deserted. The Meierhof, abandoned during the recent events, was divided in half in the second half of the 17th century and ceased to exist. It was restored in 1773. The number of houses in the village remained the same for many decades, and only began to increase in the last quarter of the 18th century thanks to the serfdom and land reform, which was carried out in 1784, including the rabization and the definitive abolition and division of the meierhof. After the abolition of the Cistercian monastery, the Staré Brno estate, including Ořešín, was administered by the state religious fund from 1782. The estate was purchased in 1825 by the Staré Brno lawyer Franz Heintl, from whose sons it was acquired in 1843 by Eduard, Prince of Schönburg-Hartenstein, who held it for several years until the abolition of the patrimonial administration. The majority of the village's inhabitants made their living from agriculture until the end of the 19th century.

=== After 1850 ===
After the establishment of the municipal system, Ořešín was an independent municipality after 1850, part of the Brno-venkov (Brno-Country) political district. The affiliation to judicial districts was more complicated. In the years 1850–1855, it fell into the Brno-horní prědměstí (lit. 'Brno-Upper Suburbs') judicial district. That year, the Brno judicial districts were merged into the judicial district of Brno, which was divided again in 1892 and Ořešín became part of the Brno-okolí (lit. 'Brno-Surroundings') judicial district. The municipality was located there until 1949, when these territorial units were abolished.

In 1850, the Staré Brno manor became an economic estate, which mainly owned the forests around Ořešín. The estate was inherited by the descendants of Prince Eduard, so it remained in the possession of the Schönburg-Hartenstein family until 1945, when it was expropriated based on the Beneš decrees. The forest district was attached to the forest estate of the University of Agriculture.

In 1907–1908, a road was built from neighboring Jehnice to Ořešín at today's Klimešova street. It was also planned to be extended from the upper part of the village through the forest to Útěchov, which was first postponed and then cancelled before World War I, as such an investment would have required Ořešín to go into heavy debt. By 1911, the local businesses registered included an inn, tobacco and liquor sales, and three shops. That year, a workers' gymnasium was founded in Ořešín, and in 1913, a volunteer fire brigade. Four residents of Ořešín died in World War I. In 1920, the local Sokol was founded and a library was also established there. In the early 1920s, a workers' gymnasium was founded. In 1930, the village was electrified and during the First Czechoslovak Republic a fire station was built. From then on, the local shepherd's hut served as the municipal office, where the library was also located. In the 1930s and 1940s, a small weaving workshop also operated here, which was moved to Rozhrání after World War II. In national and local elections, left-wing parties such as the National Socialist Party, Social Democracy and Communist Party, won in Ořešín. During the turn of the 19th and 20th centuries, the composition of the population gradually changed; in 1924, only two farmers lived here, while the number of housekeepers, who mainly worked as workers in industrial plants in the area increased.

During World War II, two residents of Ořešín were killed as political prisoners in German concentration camps. At the end of April 1945, the retreating German army placed one of its headquarters in nearby Jehnice, so German soldiers and equipment appeared in Ořešín as well. However, the village avoided direct fighting, only a few houses were damaged during shelling. No one from Ořešín died, but two women from nearby villages who were hiding there from the fighting were killed. The village was liberated by the Romanian army on the morning of May 9, 1945.

=== Communist era ===
In the post-war period, the communists also had a political advantage in Ořešín, but the national socialists retained the position of chairman of the local committee, even after February 1948. On 17 October 1949, a new bus line from Řečkovice via Mokrá Hora and Jehnice to Ořešín began operating. The small pond in the village square was replaced in 1950 with a concrete fire tank, abolished shortly after 2000. Due to the low number of farmers, which had been decreasing over a long period of time due to the small area of the fields, a unified agricultural cooperative was not established here as part of the collectivization of agriculture, but local farmers were forced to join the Jehnice state farm in 1957. In the 1950s and 1960s, water supply, sewage and public lighting were introduced in the village.

Proposals to annex Ořešín into Brno appeared as early as 1960. According to the then unrealized idea, the village was to be annexed to Jehnice and then to Brno. The final annexation into Brno was decided by the authorities in 1967, but the implementation was postponed. Ořešín, together with several other villages, became part of Brno on 26 November 1971, and was incorporated into the district of Brno VI-Řečkovice. From 1 May 1972, it was part of the district of Brno-Řečkovice, which was, however, abolished shortly afterwards and its territory, including Ořešín, was incorporated into the district of Brno V on 21 September 1972. That same year, the streets of Ořešín were given names.

=== Modern era ===
When Brno was reorganized after the fall of communism, the city district of Brno-Ořešín was established on 24 November 1990. In the early 1990s, the village was supplied with gas, and in this decade the Ořešín water tank was also built north of the village. In 2004–2005, a second water reservoir was built in Ořešín, the Jehnice water tank on Jasná street. At that time, the sports complex on the upper part of Klimešova street was also rebuilt, in 2007–2008 the Sokol sports complex on Drozdí street was modernized, and in 2008 a new fire station was built. As the first school facility in Ořešín, a container kindergarten was built in 2011, the first kindergarten of this type in Brno. In 2018, the Ořešín town hall and library were moved from the long-term unsuitable former shepherd's hut on Ronovská street to the reconstructed former Baroque gamekeeper's hut from 1744 on U zvoničky street. The adjacent space was also renovated, including the bell tower, which was converted into a chapel.

After the switch from communism to capitalism, Ořešín avoided a greater degree of suburbanization, and its development was not as fast as in other suburbs of Brno. Around 2010, Na Buble street was built up and the nucleus of Pluháčkova street was created. Ořešín currently has 11 streets.

== Geography ==
Brno-Ořešín is located in the northern part of Brno, 9 kilometers from the city center. It lies at the end of the road from Brno-Jehnice, 1 kilometer northeast of Jehnice, 3 kilometers southeast of the municipality of Lelekovice, 4 kilometers south of village of Vranov, 2 kilometers southwest of Brno-Útěchov and 3 kilometers northwest of Soběšice. It borders Brno-Jehnice to the west, the municipality of Vranov to the north, Brno-Útěchov and the municipality of Bílovice nad Svitavou to the east, and Soběšice to the south. Brno-Ořešín has an area of 3.06 km^{2}. Of this, in 2024, arable land accounted for 0.49 km^{2}, gardens 0.23 km^{2}, orchards 0.03 km^{2}, grasslands 0.05 km^{2}, forest land 2.04 km^{2}, water areas 0.01 km^{2}, built-up area 0.06 km^{2} and other areas 0.15 km^{2}.

Ořešín lies on the southern and southwestern slope of the unforested Horka hill, on the western edge of the prominent forested ridge of the Drahany highlands, facing south towards Brno. The slope falls into the deep valley of the Rakovec river and the Ořešín stream. The elevation of Ořešín ranges from 308 m in the southwest to 455 m northeast. The center of Ořešín on the village square is located at an altitude of 350–355 m above sea level. In the city district, there is the Horka peak with an altitude of 410 m above sea level, on whose slope the village is located, and two unnamed elevations in the northern forested part of Ořešín with altitudes of 453 m and 428 m.

According to the Quitt climate classification, Ořešín falls into the moderately warm MT11 region, according to the Köppen climate classification it belongs to the temperate oceanic climate Cfb.

== Administration ==
The city district of Brno-Ořešín includes the municipal part and cadastral territory of Ořešín. It is also coextensive with the basic settlement unit of Ořešín.

For Senate elections, Brno-Ořešín is included in electoral district 60 of Brno-City District.

== Demographics ==
Ořešín consisted of nine homesteads in 1656, two of which were deserted, in 1673 there were eight inhabited and one deserted. The number of houses did not increase for a long time, in 1750 there were nine inhabited: three full-time farmsteads, one three-quarter farmstead, three half-farmsteads, one quarter-farmstead, one cottager without fields. In 1771, 75 Czech-speaking inhabitants lived in Ořešín. The population continued to grow: in 1790, 96 people lived in 21 houses, in 1834, 152 people lived in 27 houses, and in 1850, the village had 149 people. Ořešín was exclusively Czech-speaking for a long time, the number of German speakers was zero even until 1945, with the sole exception of 1930, when there was one German-speaking resident registered.

Historical population

Year	Pop.	±%
1869	166	—
1880	182	+9.6%
1890	217	+19.2%
1900	245	+12.9%
1910	232	−5.3%

Year	Pop.	±%
1921	275	+18.5%
1930	333	+21.1%
1950	383	+15.0%
1961	408	+6.5%
1970	384	−5.9%

Year	Pop.	±%
1980	362	−5.7%
1991	311	−14.1%
2001	452	+45.3%
2011	577	+27.7%
2021	607	+5.2%

Source: Censuses

According to the 2021 census, there were 199 houses in Ořešín, of which 180 were inhabited. Of the total number of 199, 84 were built between 1991 and 2010. According to the 2021 census, 607 inhabitants lived in Ořešín, of which 307 were men and 300 were women. A total of 340 people reported Czech nationality, 160 Moravian nationality, 12 Slovak nationality and 1 Polish nationality; theothers did not report their nationality. 95 people belonged to the Roman Catholic Church, 2 people to the Czechoslovak Hussite Church, and 1 person to the Evangelical Church of Czech Brethren.

In terms of population, Ořešín is the smallest city district of Brno.

== Economy ==
Since Ořešín has retained its village appearance, supplemented by a smaller amount of newer suburban construction, there are no larger establishments here. In 2024, a total of 22 commercial companies and 103 businesses were registered in Ořešín. In 2024, the city district fell under the Czech Post branch in Řečkovice. On the southern edge of the city district is the collection yard of the municipal enterprise SAKO Brno, which deals with waste management.

During the First Republic and the Protectorate, Ořešín was home to an engineering workshop and a small weaving workshop.

== Transport ==
The only accessible road to Ořešín is Klimešova street from Jehnice, which is classified as a local road of the 3rd class. The city district is not passable, a road towards Útěchov is not feasible for environmental reasons.

Public transport is available via city bus lines. In 2024, the day line No. 70 and the night line No. N90 ran to Ořešín, both of which were terminated here. The nearest railway stations are Brno-Řečkovice and Česká, located on the Brno-Havlíčkův Brod line, 3 kilometers from Ořešín.

== Education ==
Children from Ořešín originally attended school in Řečkovice, first mentioned in the early 18th century. In 1872, a one-class school was built in Jehnice on the village square, which was also intended for pupils from Ořešín and Mokrá Hora. This was replaced in 1895 by a new three-class school building on today's Blanenská street.

In 2011, a container school building was built on Drozdí street in Ořešín itself, which houses the charitable organization Mateřská škola Oříšek Brno, founded by Brno-Ořešín. It is the only school facility in the city district. In 2023, the entire city district was part of the catchment area of the Oříšek kindergarten, the Blanenská elementary school and kindergarten in Jehnice, and the Novoměstská elementary school in Řečkovice.

== Sights ==
Ořešín is one of three city districts of Brno that do not have any protected monuments. However, there is a historical gamekeeper's lodge and several small cultural landmarks:

- The former gamekeeper's lodge on U zvoničky street, now the seat of the city district's office. A Baroque building from 1744, substantially renovated in the 1920s for the needs of the office, preserving its original appearance.
- The chapel of the Immaculate Heart of Mary on U zvoničky street, next to the former gamekeeper's lodge. The prismatic brick building, possibly from 1865, was originally a bell tower, but was consecrated and converted into a chapel during the reconstruction in 2018.
- Column shrines (boží muka) from 2005 on Horka. This small sacral building was built by Eugen Morbacher, a citizen of Rečkovice, in memory of his wife, who died in 1945 during the liberation of Ořešín. His family was hiding in Ořešín from the retreating German troops at the end of World War II.
- A monument to the fallen in the world wars from 1960 in the village square at Klimešova street. The original monument to the fallen from 1925 was located at Příhon street.

== Notable people ==
- Naďa Johanisová (born 1956), ecological economist and environmentalist
- Josef Kapoun (1886–1958), politician, mayor of Ořešín in 1931–1933, member of the Constituent National Assembly and the National Assembly in 1946–1954
- Václav Klimeš (1894–1942), resistance fighter, died in the Mauthausen concentration camp
- Jiří Václavek (1942–2010), politician, member of the Chamber of Deputies from 1996 to 2006
- Mojmír Vlašín (born 1954), zoologist, ecologist and politician, mayor of Brno-Ořešín in 2005-2006
- Štěpán Vlašín (1923–2012), literary critic and historian
