= Mokrá Hora =

- Cadastral territory of Brno
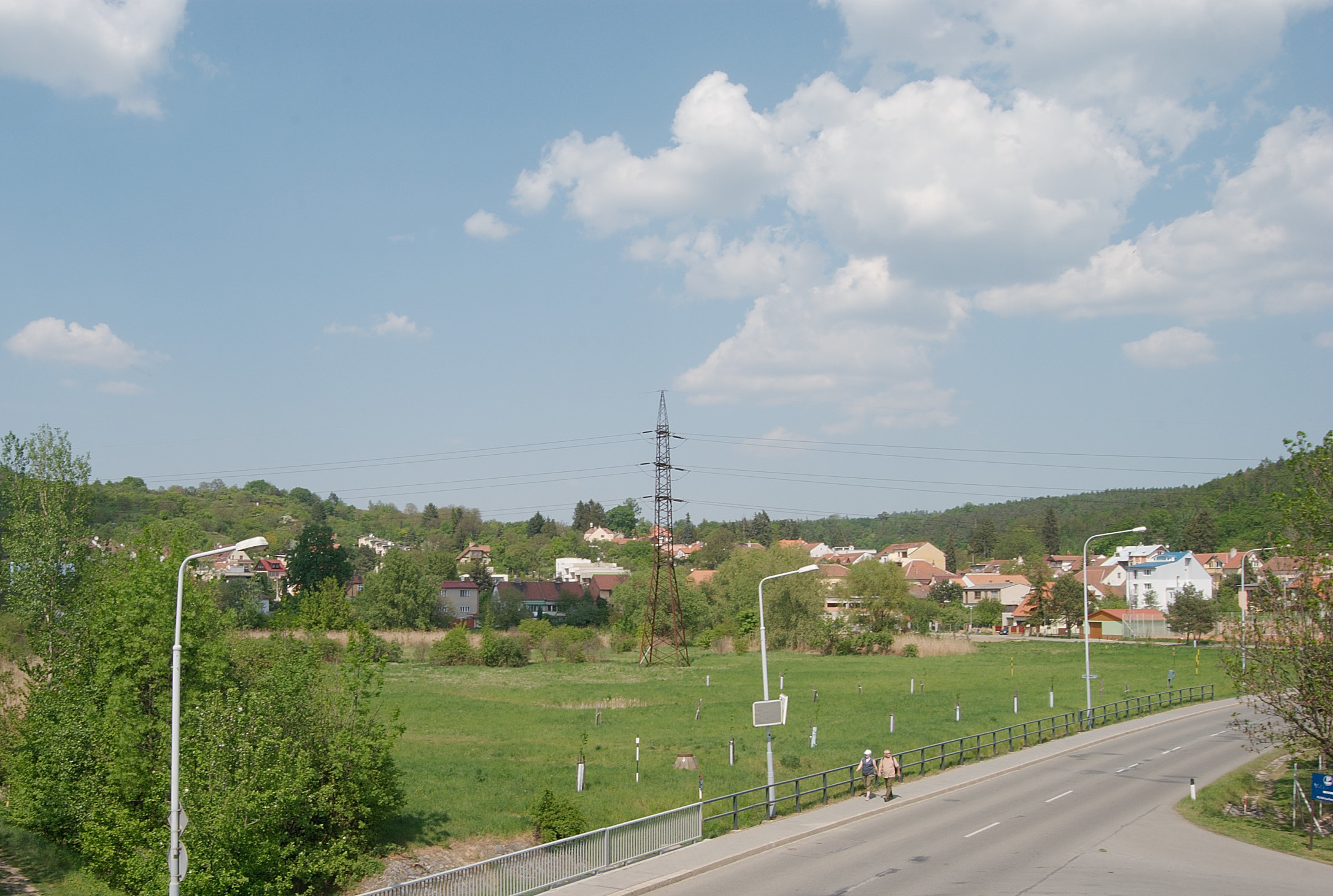
- View of Mokrá Hora from the southwest

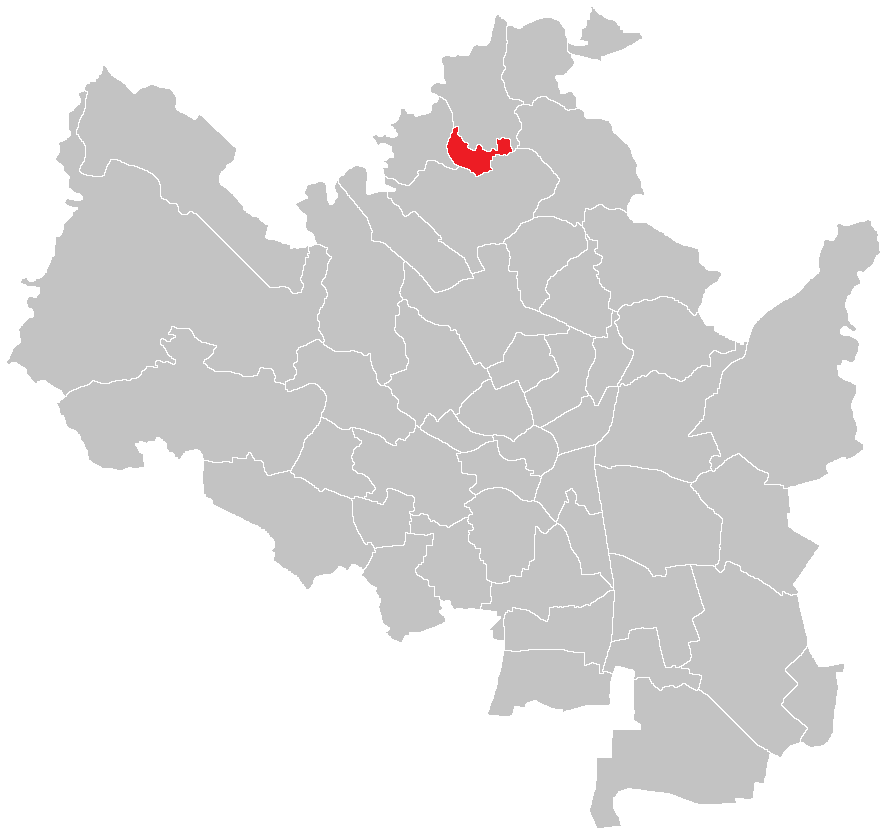
- Location of Mokrá Hora in Brno 49°15′32″N 16°35′37″E
- Country: Czech Republic
- Region: South Moravian Region
- City: Brno
- City district: Brno-Řečkovice a Mokrá Hora

Area
  - Total: 0.88 km^{2} (0.34 sq mi)

Population (2021)
  - Total: 865
  - Density: 980/km^{2} (2,500/sq mi)
- Time zone: UTC+1 (CET)
  - Summer (DST): UTC+2 (CEST)
- Postal code: 621 00

Mokrá Hora is a municipal part and cadastral territory in the north part of Brno, Czech Republic part of the city district of Brno-Řečkovice a Mokrá Hora. Mokrá Hora was originally an independent municipality that was annexed to Brno in 1960. It has an area of 0.88 km^{2} (0.34 sq mi), and as such it is the smallest cadastral territory of Brno in terms of area. About 865 people live here.

It is located above the Ponávka river, on the edge of the forested area of Soběšická vrchovina.

== Etymology ==
The toponym Mokrá Hora probably comes from the founder of the village, who probably was Jan Josef Noss von Nossberg. His noble surname von Nossberg, which he acquired even before the establishment of the village, can be translated as "from the Wet Mountain" (the German word nass means "wet", Berg is "mountain"). An earlier interpretation derived the local name from the local wet, even swampy terrain near two watercourses and at the foot of a wet hill.

The name of the village has always been almost the same. From the beginning in the 18th century, the one-word variant Mokrahora was used in Czech and German, and during the 19th century the Czech name Mokrá Hora appeared. At the time of the Protectorate, the name Mokrahora was used in German in the years 1939–1945.

== History ==
Mokrá Hora belonged to the free court in neighboring Jehnice since the Middle Ages. In order to provide labor on this estate, a settlement was established in the southern part of the fields belonging to the free court around the road from Řečkovice to Jehnice. Its creation can be dated to the years 1725–1740; it was probably founded in the first half of the 1830s by the then owner of the farm, Jan Josef Noss von Nossberg, from whom it apparently got its name. In 1779, Franz Joseph I, the owner of the Pozořice estate, which also included the rest of Jehnice, bought the estate. His son Aloys I donated all of Jehnice and Mokrá Hora to knight Haymerle, creating a small independent estate. Haymerle and his children held it until 1827, then Josef Hayek and his children, and after 1831 Anna Hermannová and her children. At the turn of the 20s and 30s of the 18th century, a vogt and a burgomaster are documented in Mokrá Hora, so the settlement was managed separately within the estate. Mokrá Hora's inhabitants worked mainly as wage agricultural workers on the Jehnice farm, they also performed manual labor in the Jehnice brewery or in Brno's factories.

=== After 1850 ===
After the abolition of the patrimonial administration and the establishment of the municipal establishment, from 1850 Mokrá Hora fell under the municipality of Jehnice in the Brno-Country district. In 1953, Mokrá Hora became independent and continued to be an independent municipality in the Brno-Country district until 1960, when it was annexed to Brno. In the system of judicial districts, it belonged to Brno-horní predměstí (Brno-Upper suburban areas) in the years 1850–1855, then to the united district of Brno. until 1892, and subsequently to the judicial district of Brno-okolí (Brno-Surroundings) until 1949, when the judicial districts were abolished.

During the second half of the 19th century, there was a slight development of the village. In 1885, the railway line from Brno to Tišnov (without a stop here) was put into operation along Ponávka, on the western edge of Mokrá Hora, and later the road from Řečkovice to Jehnice via Mokrá Hora was built. Already at the end of the 19th century, the first villas of Brno entrepreneurs and merchants began to appear here. At the beginning of the 20th century, the village and its surroundings became a popular place for tourists and day-trippers from Brno. In 1907, the Okrašlovací spolek (society) was founded here, which not only took care of the local cultural life, but also devoted itself to other activities. Thanks to it, benches for hikers were installed in the surrounding forests, built a river swimming pool on the Rakovec stream in 1911, and in 1919 participated in the creation of a monument to those who died in the World War I. In the same year, Mokrá Hora also discussed separation from Jehnice and the creation of a separate municipality, but this proposal was rejected. Mokrá Hora experienced rapid development in the interwar period, when it became more of a suburban village. The construction of villas continued and thanks to the Okrašlovací spolek, the village was electrified in 1923. Later, the village was also gasified. In 1928, the local swimming pool was modernized and in 1938 a volunteer fire department was founded. The interests of the inhabitants of the village were defended in the Jehnice council by elected representatives, and from the 1930s at the latest, the deputy mayor of Jehnice was always a resident of Mokrá Hora. Social democrats and national socialists predominated among the elected representatives of Mokrá Hora.

The final battles of World War II did not affect Mokrá Hora much, even though Jehnice itself was considerably damaged by them in May 1945. Tourism in the area declined after the war, as the newly built Brno Reservoir became a more attractive place for Brno residents. In the post-war political structure of the Jehnice self-government, communists and social democrats predominated among the representatives of Mokrá Hora, but after the coup in 1948, representatives of other parties were replaced in the local committee by other members of the communist party. The local committee sessions were held alternately in Jehnice and Mokrá Hora.

=== Modern era ===
After 1948, private businesses began to disappear in Mokrá Hora. Only the Jednota grocery store and the dairy remained here, and two inns continued to operate here. In 1949, the operation of the bus line from Řečkovice to Orešín via Mokrá Hora was started, and the name of the village was also changed, the name Jehnice-Mokrá Hora used at the time was shortened to the previously used Jehnice. In the second half of the 1940s, proposals for the independence of the village appeared again, and in 1949 Mokrá Hora residents finally spoke out for separation from Jehnice. On January 1, 1953, Mokrá Hora became an independent municipality and at the same time its current cadastral territory was created, which was separated from the southern part of Jehnice. In 1953, the activities of Okrašlovací spolek were terminated, although the remaining associations, such as volunteer firefighters or newly established organizations, such as the Czechoslovak Youth Union, were not very active. In the same year, the unified agricultural cooperative (JZD) in Mokrá Hora was founded, but due to its small size and poor management, it was merged into the JZD in Medlánky in 1956. The management of the forests that belonged to the Jehnice farm, which was expropriated in 1949–1950, was divided between the forests in Kuřim (west of the Řečkovice–Vranov road) and the school forest farm of the then Brno University of Agriculture (east of the same road). In 1953, a new railway line from Brno to Tišnov was put into operation, replacing the old one along almost the same route. During the 50s of the 20th century, a municipal radio station was established in Mokrá Hora, and from 1955 the local swimming pool was operated by the municipality. An earlier library and an educational seminar founded in 1958 functioned here.

On July 1, 1960, Mokrá Hora became, along with several other municipalities, part of Brno. It was incorporated into the Brno V municipal district, where it remained until 1964, when it became part of Řečkovice. After 1971, it was part of the Brno VI-Řečkovice municipal district. From May 1, 1972, it was part of the Brno-Řečkovice district, which, however, was abolished shortly afterwards and its territory, including Mokrá Hora, was annexed to the Brno V district on September 21, 1972.

As early as 1960, streets were named and in 1961 a kindergarten was opened in Tumaňanova Street. During the cadastral reform at the end of the 1960s, the cadastral territory of Mokrá Hora was enlarged to the current form. The tank of the former swimming pool was converted into a fish breeding facility.

During the new administrative division of Brno after the Velvet Revolution, on November 24, 1990, Mokrá Hora became part of the city district of Brno-Řečkovice, which changed its name to Brno-Řečkovice a Mokrá Hora in 1997. Between 2003 and 2005 at the latest, the packets set up from the former swimming pool ceased to be used and the area remained unused. In 2014–2015, the reservoir was abolished and a small sports complex was created in its place.

== Geography ==
Mokrá Hora is located in the northern part of Brno in the city district of Brno-Řečkovice a Mokrá Hora, 7 km (4.3 mi) from the center of Brno. It lies on the road between Řečkovice and Jehnice, 1 km (0.62 mi) south of Jehnice, 2 km (1.2 mi) west of Soběšice, 1 km (0.62 mi) northeast of Řečkovice and 2 km (1.2 mi) east of Ivanovice. It borders Jehnice to the north, Řečkovice to the south and Ivanovice to the west. Mokrá Hora has an area of 0.88 km^{2} (0.34 sq mi), making it the smallest cadastral area in Brno. Of this, in 2020, arable land comprised 0.15 km^{2} (0.058 sq mi), gardens 0.22 km^{2} (0.085 sq mi), orchards 0.02 km^{2} (0.0077 sq mi), grassland 0.02 km^{2} (0.0077 sq mi), forest land 0.20 km^{2} (0.077 sq mi), water bodies 0.03 km^{2} (0.012 sq mi), built-up area 0.07 km^{2} (0.027 sq mi) and the rest 0.16 km^{2} (0.062 sq mi).

The village is located on the slope of a promontory above the confluence of Rakovec and Ponávka, on the western edge of the distinctive wooded ridge of the Drahany highlands, facing south towards Brno. The altitude of Mokrá Hora ranges from 239 m (784 ft) (the confluence of Rakovec and Ponávka on the southern border) to 318 m (1,043 ft) (the slope of the promontory above Rakovec in the northeastern part). The center of the village near the bell tower is located at an altitude of 250 m (820 ft). There is no peak in Mokrá Hora.

According to the Quitt climate classification, Mokrá Hora falls into the moderately warm zone MT11, and according to the Köppen climate classification, it belongs to the moderate oceanic climate Cfb.

== Administration ==
Mokrá Hora is part of the Brno-Řečkovice and Mokrá Hora city district. The registration municipal part of Mokrá Hora is coextensive with the cadastral territory of Mokrá Hora. Mokrá Hora also consists of only one basic settlement unit, Tumaňanova.

For the purposes of the senate elections, Mokrá Hora is included in electoral district No. 60 of Brno-City District.

== Demographics ==
The first documented information about the population of Mokrá Hora comes from 1753, when cottagers lived here in eight houses. The entirety of Mokrá Hora was almost exclusively Czech-speaking for a long time, the number of German speakers was minimal even until 1945. The largest number of German-speaking residents registered in 1890, when there were six of them.

Historical population

Year	Pop.	±%
1869	294	—
1880	306	+4.1%
1890	296	−3.3%
1900	343	+15.9%
1910	373	+8.7%

Year	Pop.	±%
1921	470	+26.0%
1930	598	+27.2%
1950	597	−0.2%
1961	710	+18.9%
1970	672	−5.4%

Year	Pop.	±%
1980	620	−7.7%
1991	588	−5.2%
2001	687	+16.8%
2011	901	+31.1%
2021	865	−4.0%

Source: Censuses

=== Religion ===
In the past, Mokrá Hora belonged to the parish of Řečkovice, where it still belongs under the Roman Catholic administration. The belfry in the village was apparently built in 1889. From the 17th century, a pilgrimage route from Řečkovice to Vranov led through Mokrá Hora, along which there were several small sacral monuments (statues, divine torment). At the bend in the road (today's Tumaňanova street) towards Jehnice, from the 1880s at the latest, there was a baroque statue of St. Francis of Paola, apparently originating from the Vranov monastery, where it was returned around 1970 (it stands next to the church by the bell tower). There was never a cemetery in Mokrá Hora, the inhabitants of the village were buried in the cemeteries in Řečkovice, from the 1950s in the cemetery in Jehnice, and from 1960 also in the central cemetery in Brno.

From 1922, Mokrá Hora fell under the jurisdiction of the Brno religious community of the Czechoslovak Hussite Church, from 1927 it belonged to the religious community in Královo Pole, and from 1940 it belonged to the religious community of Řečkovice.

== Education ==
Children from Mokrá Hora originally attended school in Řečkovice. In 1872, a one-class school was established in the village in Jehnice, which was also intended for pupils from Orešín and Mokrá Hora. Due to the increase in the number of pupils, a new three-classroom school was built at the southern edge of Jehnice in 1895, which was later expanded. In 1961, a kindergarten building was built right in Mokrá Hora, which now houses the charity organization Mateřská škola Paraplíčko Brno, at Tumaňanova 59, which was founded by Brno-Řečkovice a Mokrá Hora. In 2020, the whole district was part of the area of the Paraplíčko Kindergarten in Brno and the Horácké náměstí elementary school in Řečkovice.

== Transport ==
Road III/37918 passes through the core of Mokrá Hora in a north–south direction, which thus forms the axis of the village and which connects Řečkovice and road III/37917 between Lelekovice and Vranov. In Mokrá Hora, it runs along Tumaňanova street. It is also the only road connection between Mokrá Hora and Brno.

Public mass transport is provided within the framework of the integrated transport system of the South Moravian Region by city bus lines. In 2020, the day line No. 70 and the night line No. N90 ran through Mokrá Hora, both of which went through Jehnice to Orešín. The nearest railway stop is Brno-Řečkovice, located on the Brno-Havlíčkův Brod line, 1 km from Mokrá Hora.
