= Brno-Ivanovice =

- City District of Brno
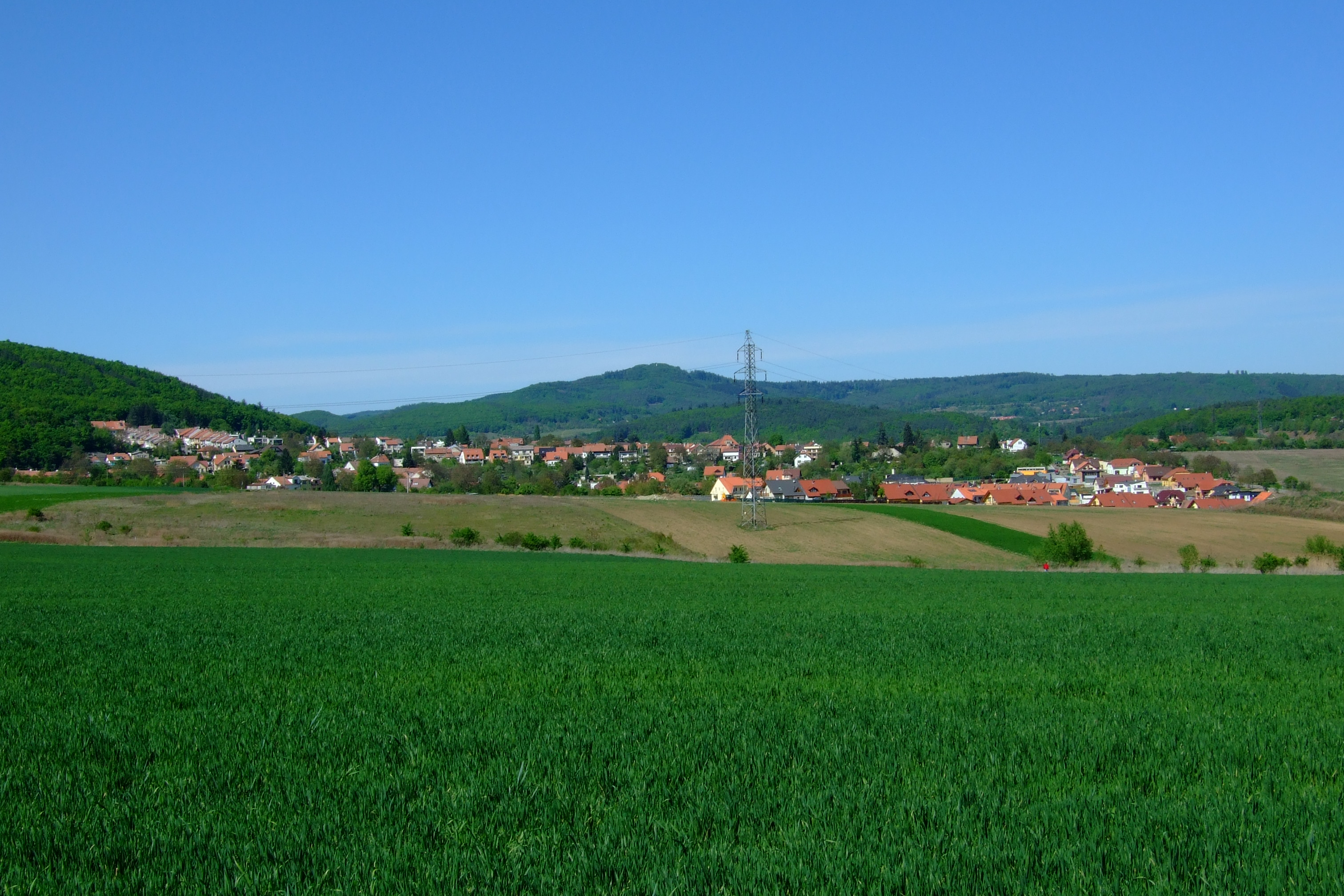
- View of Ivanovice from the south

- Flag Coat of arms

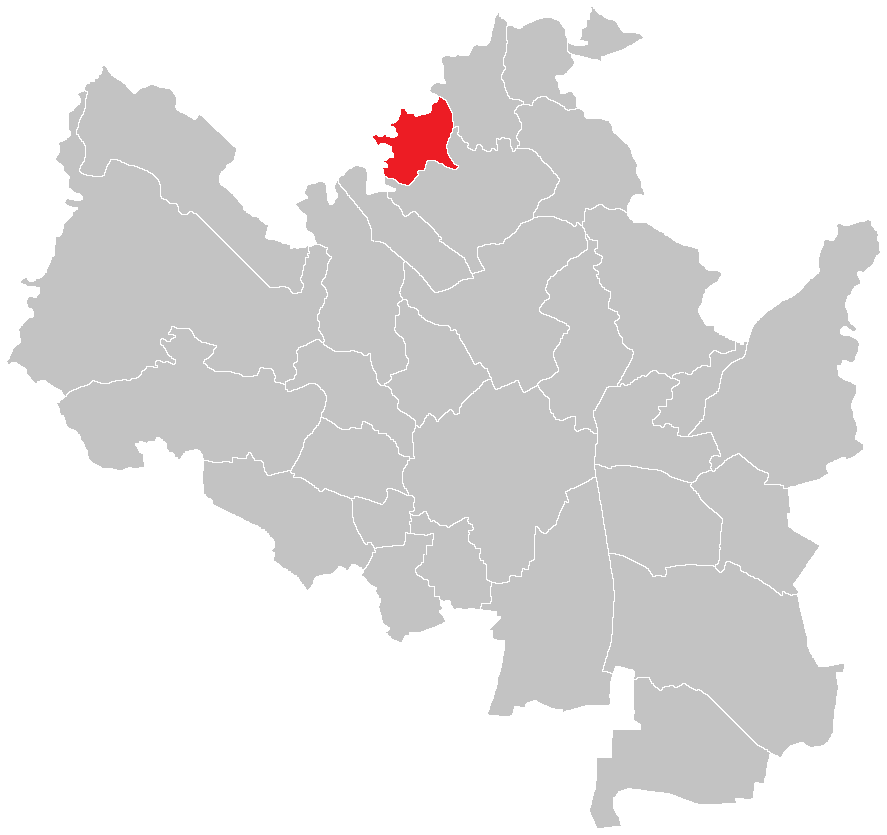
- Location of Brno-Ivanovice in Brno
- Coordinates: 49°15′53″N 16°33′53″E
- Country: Czech Republic
- Region: South Moravian
- City: Brno

Government
  - Mayor: Jana Bohuňovská (ODS)

Area
  - Total: 2.45 km^{2} (0.95 sq mi)

Population (2023)
  - Total: 1,994
  - Density: 814/km^{2} (2,110/sq mi)
- Time zone: UTC+1 (CET)
  - Summer (DST): UTC+2 (CEST)
- Postal code: 621 00
- Website: www.mcivanovice.cz

Brno-Ivanovice is a city district in the north part of the city of Brno, Czech Republic. It consists of the municipal part and cadastral territory of Ivanovice (German: Eiwanowitz), originally an independent municipality that was annexed to Brno in 1971. The city district was established on 24 November 1990. Almost 2,000 people live here.

For the purposes of the senate elections, Brno-Ivanovice is included in electoral district number 60 of Brno-City District.

== Geography ==
Ivanovice has an area of 2.45 km^{2}. It has a village character. It is located on the northern edge of the city of Brno, at the eastern edge of the wooded hills of the Baba Nature Park.

Brno-Ivanovice borders in the east with Brno-Jehnice, in the southeast with Brno-Řečkovice a Mokrá Hora, on the west with the municipality of Jinačovice, and on the north with Česká.

== History ==
The first written mention of Ivanovice dates from 1358. It was always a small village, the size of which did not change until the 19th century. Ivanovice belonged to Řečkovice, it was first owned by the Augustinian Monastery in Brno, after its abolition in 1581 by the Jesuits in Brno. Finally, after 1773, Řečkovice acquired secular holders. The old imperial road connecting Brno with Svitavy ran east of Ivanovice, along which a new imperial road was built from 1752. Ivanovice recorded growth only in the 20th century, more significant growth has been occurring since the 1970s.

Some lands in the south of modern Ivanovice were annexed to Brno a total of two times. Until the 1960s, these lands were part of Řečkovice, within which they were annexed to Brno as early as 16 April 1919. During the cadastral reform of Brno in 1966–1969, these lands were separated from Brno and annexed to the then municipality of Ivanovice u Brna, which was then annexed into Brno on 26 November 1971. Within Brno, Ivanovice was incorporated into the Brno VI-Řečkovice district, renamed on 1 May 1972, to Brno-Řečkovice.

On 1 January 1976, based on the resolution dated 12 December 1975, Ivanovice acquired its current northern and western borders, when it acquired 4 hectares of land from Jinačovice, and 10 hectares from Česká, while at the same time 4.02 hectares of land passed from Ivanovice to Česká. From 21 September 1972 to 23 November 1990, Ivanovice was part of the Brno V municipal district, administered by Královo Pole. On 24 November 1990, the current city district of Brno-Ivanovice was established.

== Demographics ==
Historical population

Year	Pop.	±%
1869	201	—
1880	222	+10.4%
1890	271	+22.1%
1900	282	+4.1%
1910	316	+12.1%

Year	Pop.	±%
1921	355	+12.3%
1930	428	+20.6%
1950	515	+20.3%
1961	507	−1.6%
1970	480	−5.3%

Year	Pop.	±%
1980	537	+11.9%
1991	687	+27.9%
2001	999	+45.4%
2011	1,746	+74.8%
2021	1,997	+14.4%

Source: Censuses

== Transport ==
While there are no tram lines, the bus lines 41, 42 and 304 go through Ivanovice.

The I/43 road from Brno to Svitavy, which is part of the European route E461, passes through the territory of the district.
