= Řečkovice =

- Cadastral territory of Brno
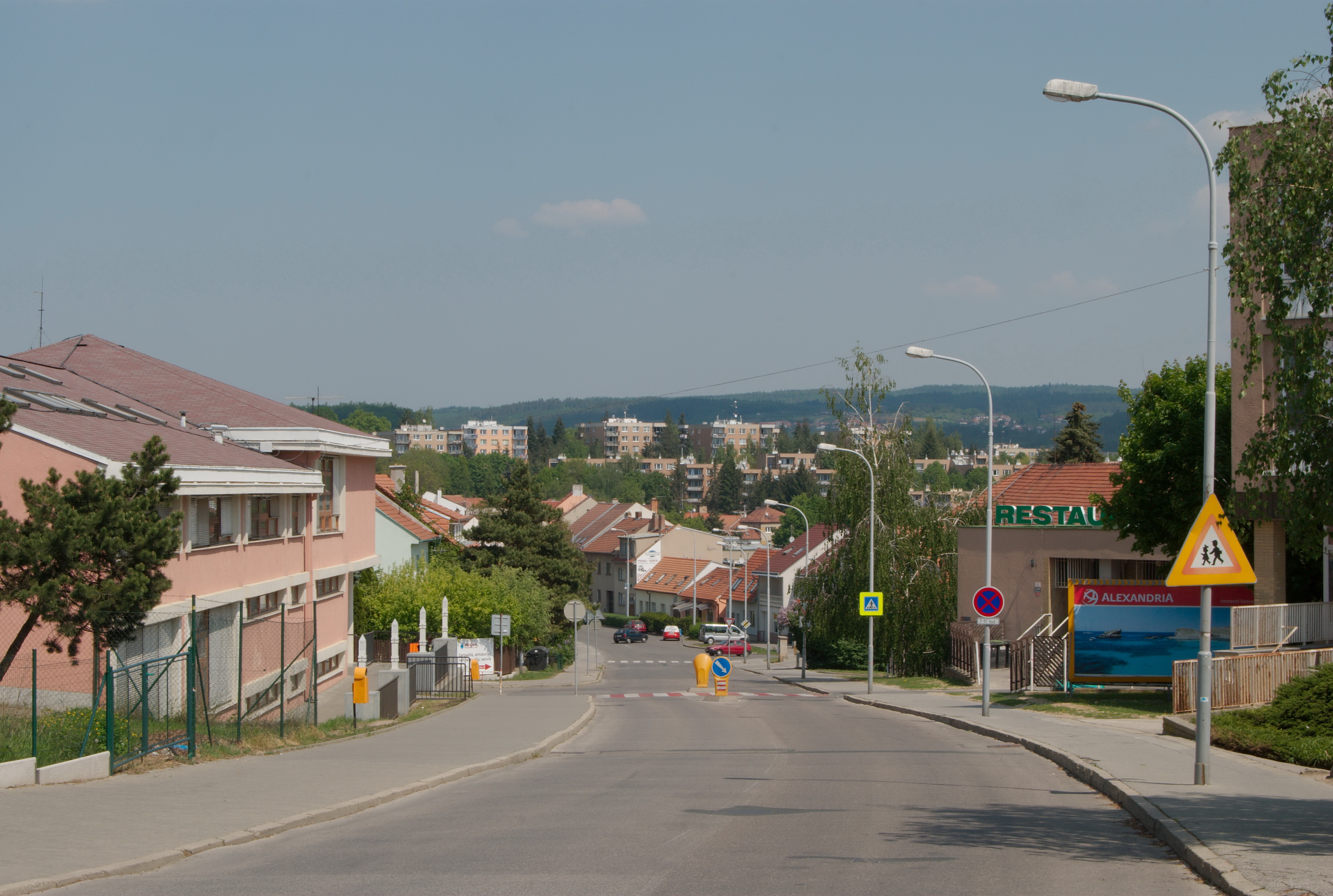
- View of Řečkovice over Vážného street

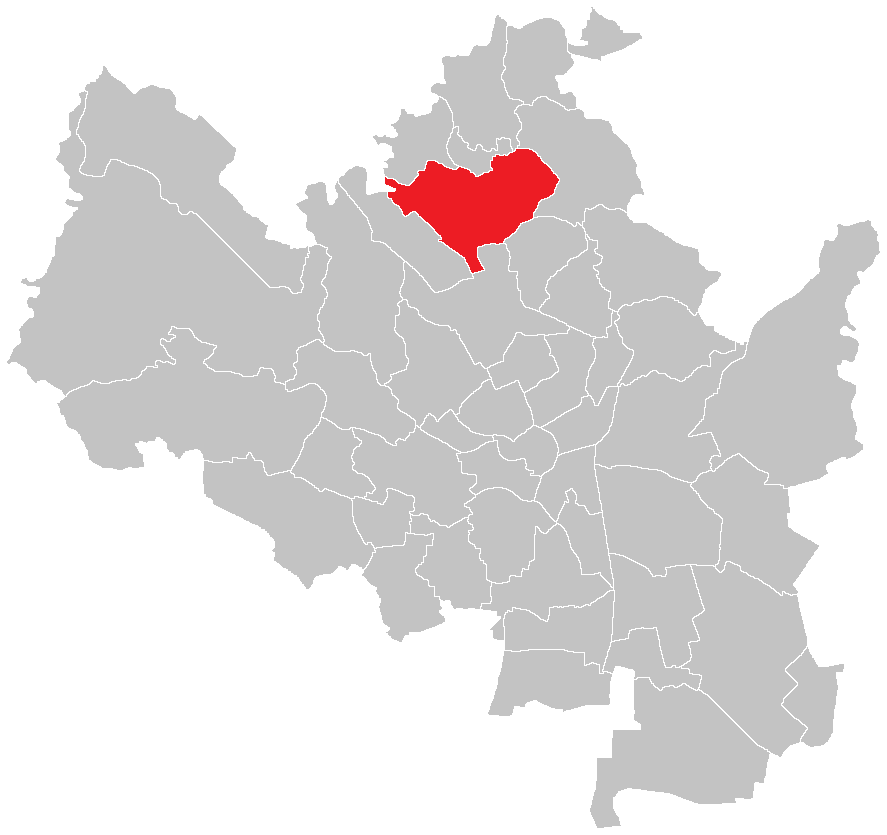
- Location of Řečkovice in Brno 49°15′3″N 16°34′53″E
- Country: Czech Republic
- Region: South Moravian Region
- City: Brno
- City district: Brno-Řečkovice a Mokrá Hora

Area
  - Total: 6.68 km^{2} (2.58 sq mi)

Population (2021)
  - Total: 14,262
  - Density: 2,140/km^{2} (5,530/sq mi)
- Time zone: UTC+1 (CET)
  - Summer (DST): UTC+2 (CEST)
- Postal code: 621 00

Řečkovice (German: Rzeczkowitz/Retschkowitz, Hantec: Řečky/Řečkany) is a municipal part and cadastral territory in the northern part of the city of Brno, Czech Republic. It has an area of 6.68 km². Originally an independent municipality, it was annexed to Brno in 1919, since November 24, 1990 it has been part of the city district of Brno-Řečkovice a Mokrá Hora, alongside Mokrá Hora. Over 14,000 people live here.

== History ==
The first written mention of Řečkovice dates from 1277, when Ottokar II of Bohemia donated the courtyard of the St. John's Chapel to Špilberk. The modern development of Řečkovice began only in the 1890s, in which mainly the non-agricultural population participated, such as workers from factories in Brno and Královo Pole.

Řečkovice was annexed to Brno on April 16, 1919. Until the second cadastral reform of Brno in the late 1960s, however, Řečkovice had somewhat different boundaries than at present. In the south, they ended with the southernmost houses in Banskobystrická street; Kuřimská Street, the abandoned brickyard in Podpěrová Street and the gardens in the northwest of the modern Rechkovice cadastre originally belonged to neighboring Medlánky, while Palackého třída and the southernmost parts of Vránovy, Novoměstská, Sportovní and Žitná streets originally belonged to Králov Pol. On the other hand, Řečkovice originally belonged to the marginal parts of the modern cadastre of Mokrá Hory and some agricultural land in the south of the modern cadastre of Ivanovice.

In the years 1970–1977, the Novoměstská housing estate was established on the Novoměstská and Žitná streets near the old development. The current city district of Brno-Řečkovice a Mokrá Hora was established on November 24, 1990.

== Description ==
Řečkovice, through which important road and rail transport routes pass, currently has an urban character. The office of Brno-Řečkovice a Mokrá Hora is also located here. A significant part of the development of Řečkovice consists of family houses, alongside them there are also panel houses. In the east of Řečkovice, behind the railway stop on the line connecting Brno to Tišnov, there is an extensive industrial complex of the former pharmaceutical company Lachema. Apart from it, otherwise the eastern half consists only of the vast forests of Soběšická vrchovina. In them, in the valley of the Kubelína stream near Soběšice, there is the natural monument of Soběšické rybníčky.

== Geography ==
Řečkovice borders the municipality of Jinačovice and the cadastral territories Medlánky in the west, Královo Pole in the south, Sadová in the southeast, Soběšice in the east, Ivanovice, Jehnice and Mokrá Hora in the north.

== Territorial divisions ==
The cadastral territory of Řečkovice is further divided into 12 basic settlement units.

Basic settlement unit	Population		
Basic settlement unit	2011	2021	Change
Banskobystrická	3,048	3,062	+0.5%
U Kuřimské	1,550	1,532	-1.2%
Sídliště Žitná-Kuřimská	3,718	3,554	-4.4%
Družstevní	2,348	2,439	+3.9%
Pod Malou Babou	73	53	-27.4%
Žilkova	516	613	+18.8%
Palackého náměstí	1,903	1,682	-11.6%
Sídliště Hapalova	851	799	-6.1%
Dolnice	530	478	-9.8%
Řečkovice-nádraží	7	6	-14.3%
Řečkovický mlýn	37	33	-10.8%
Kobylín	4	11	+175.0%

== Demographics ==
Historical population

Year	Pop.	±%
1869	791	—
1880	931	+17.7%
1890	1,064	+14.3%
1900	1,289	+21.1%
1910	2,176	+68.8%

Year	Pop.	±%
1921	2,410	+10.8%
1930	4,355	+80.7%
1950	5,542	+27.3%
1961	6,233	+12.5%
1970	6,806	+9.2%

Year	Pop.	±%
1980	17,109	+151.4%
1991	15,216	−11.1%
2001	14,304	−6.0%
2011	14,585	+2.0%
2021	14,262	−2.2%

Source: Censuses
