= Brno-Útěchov =

- City District of Brno
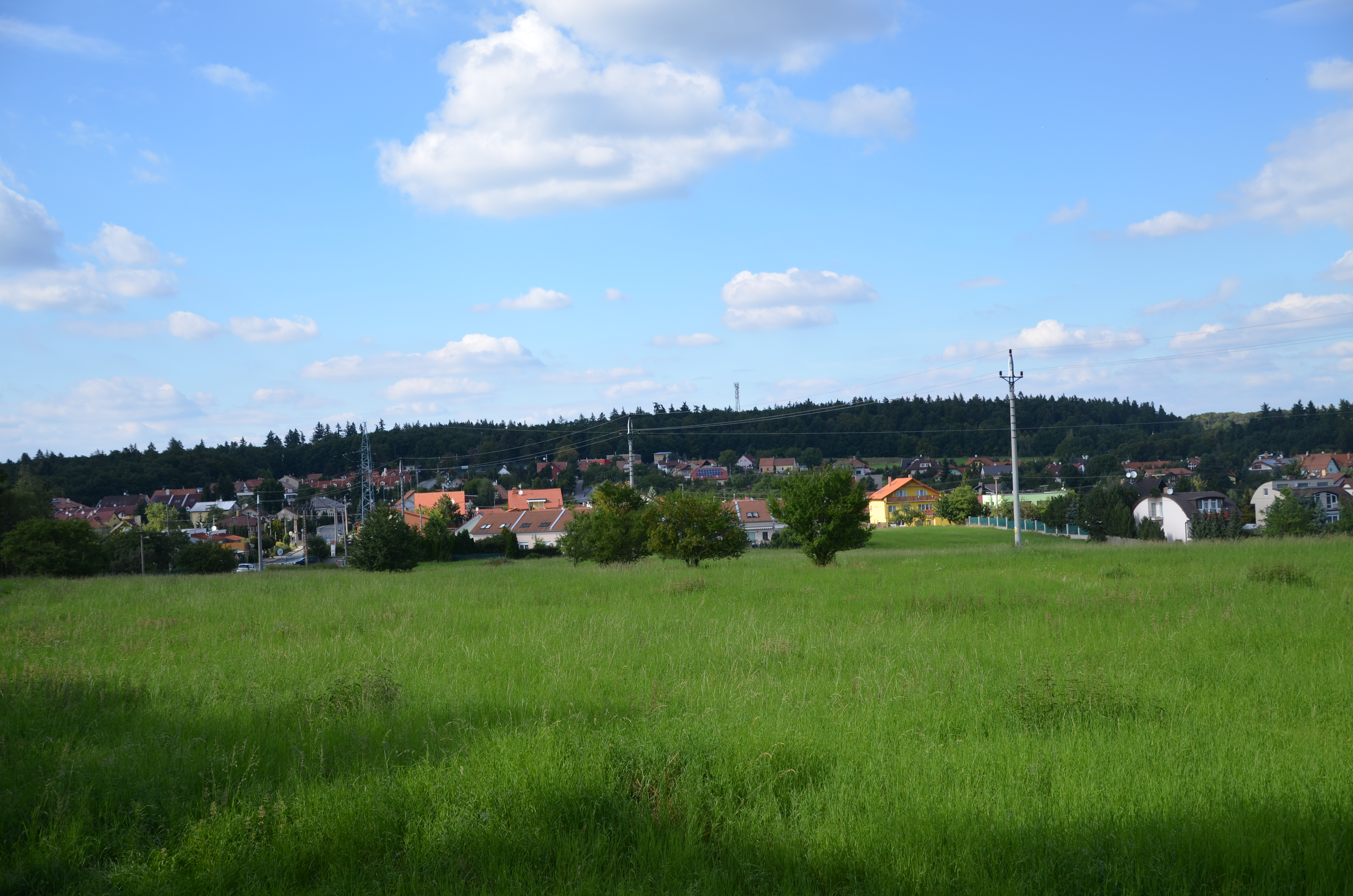
- View of Útěchov from the south

- Flag Coat of arms

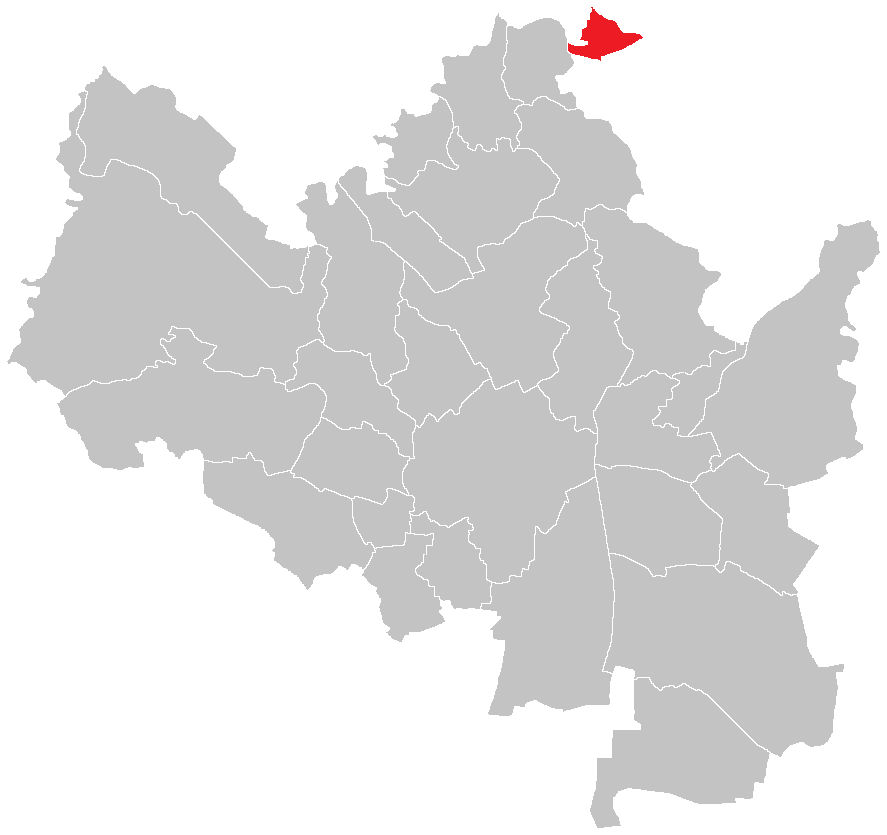
- Location of Brno-Útěchov in Brno
- Coordinates: 49°10′34″N 16°31′45″E
- Country: Czech Republic
- Region: South Moravian
- City: Brno

Government
  - Mayor: Zdeněk Drahoš

Area
  - Total: 1.18 km^{2} (0.46 sq mi)

Population (2023)
  - Total: 853
  - Density: 723/km^{2} (1,870/sq mi)
- Time zone: UTC+1 (CET)
  - Summer (DST): UTC+2 (CEST)
- Postal code: 644 00
- Website: brno-utechov.cz

Brno-Útěchov is a city district on the northern edge of the city of Brno, Czech Republic. It consists of the municipal part and cadastral territory of Útěchov (Útěchov u Brna), originally a municipality which was the last to be annexed into Brno in 1980. It has an area of 1.18 km^{2} and about 900 inhabitants. It is the smallest city district of Brno in terms of area. The district is completely surrounded by the forests of the Soběšice uplands.

== Etymology ==
The name Útěchov is formed from the personal name Utěch and the possessive suffix -ov, so the name means "Utěch's village".

Throughout history, there have been many variants of the local name Útěchov. It was first mentioned in 1365 as Utyechaw, and in 1567 it was written dvořák na Autiechowie. At the end of the 17th and in the first half of the 18th century, in addition to the form Autiechow, it was also called Tři Dvory (German: Drey hofen), or Tři Dvory u Útěchova (German: Drey hofen bei Autiechow), because it was formed by three estates. During the 19th century, the variant Autiechau prevailed in German, and at the turn of the 19th and 20th centuries, then Autěchau. In Czech, the versions Autěchow, Autěchov and Outěchov were used at that time. The village was first mentioned as Útěchov in 1854 and 1881. This name was also chosen when the village was officially named in 1924. During the protectorate, the name Autiechau was used in German from 1939 to 1945.

== History ==
Útěchov was first mentioned in written sources in 1365. At that time, it was owned by Čeněk Krušina of Lichtenburg from the Lichtenburg family of the Ronov, as part of the new estate of the nearby Ronov castle, who then registered a dowry for his wife in the land registers on this estate. In 1371 and 1376, Havel of Útěchov is mentioned, who was probably a Lichtenburg manor. The new center of the estate at that time was Nový Hrad (lit. 'New Castle'), where Čeněk Krušina moved. Because he died childless, the estate, including Útěchov, fell to the margrave Jobst of Moravia upon his death. In 1411, he pledged it to Vaněk Černohorský of Boskovice. The Černá Hora branch of the Boskovice lords then held the Nový Hrad estate, except for short periods around 1419 and the 1560s, until the turn of the 16th and 17th centuries, when Ferdinand I sold it to them in 1562. This year is associated with the mention of the free court in Útěchov. In 1597, the estate was inherited by his daughter Kateřina, who married Maximilian of Liechtenstein that year. In 1604, he became a co-owner of the Nový Hrad estate, which meant that the Liechtensteins acquired this property and Útěchov. The Nový Hrad estate was then connected with the Pozořice estate, which had its seat in Pozořice at the local castle. Útěchov was part of the Pozořice estate until the abolition of the patrimonial administration in 1848.

Útěchov was a small village, although independent, headed by a vogt. After the Thirty Years' War, the village consisted of only three homesteads, from which the then variant name of the settlement, Tři Dvory, was derived, first documented in 1667. Eight years later, according to the land register, four settlers were farming here and the number of houses and residents gradually increased. Almost all of the residents Útěchov made their living from agriculture.

After the establishment of municipalities in 1850, Útěchov became part of neighboring Vranov. One Útěchov resident was always required to be one of the councilors of Vranov, thus ensuring the interests of the village residents. Together with Vranov, Útěchov was from that year part of the political district of Brno-venkov (Brno-Country) and the judicial district of Brno-horní prědměstí (lit. 'Brno-Upper Suburbs'). In 1855, the Brno judicial districts were merged into the judicial district of Brno, which was divided again in 1892. From that time on, Vranov and Útěchov fell into the judicial district of Brno-okolí (lit. 'Brno-Surroundings') until 1949, when these territorial units were abolished. In 1923, Útěchov became an independent municipality. It retained its affiliation to the Brno-Country District until 1980, when the village was annexed to Brno and thus included in Brno-City District.

The surrounding forests remained in the possession of the Lichtensteins even after the abolition of patrimonial administration in the mid-19th century and fell under the Adamov forest estate within the Pozořice estate, which was the largest estate of this family in the Czech lands with 14,711 hectares. Around 1864, a road was built between Soběšice and Vranov at today's Adamovská street in Útěchov. In 1911, a road was built down to Útěchov to the stream at today's Boří street. In the second half of the 19th century, most of the inhabitants worked in agriculture or forestry, some housekeepers made a living as workers in Brno's factories. Since 1850, a pub has been operating in Útěchov, the location of which initially changed depending on the operator. The permanent inn no. 24 was built in 1905. There were not many other businesses, their number was more appropriate for a small village.

In 1903, the organization of Social Democracy in Útěchov was founded, and two years later, a workers' gymnasium was established. Two Útěchov residents died in World War I. In 1923, the local Sokol was founded, and three years later, a volunteer fire brigade was also founded, which became the main organizer of social events. That same year, as part of the land reform, the Liechtenstein forest estate Adamov was expropriated. It became a school farm of the University of Agriculture (today's Mendel University) and from 1932 it was called the Masaryk Forest School Forest Farm.

In 1923, Útěchov, which had been part of Vranov until then, became a municipality. In the first municipal elections, the communist party won with 7 seats. The cadastral area of Útěchov had until then consisted of the village's built up area and agricultural land, so it was relatively small and its border was formed by the then forest. It was at the expense of Vranov that Útěchov was then expanded to include forest land. While in 1845 it had an area of only 0.50 km^{2}, 103 years later, in 1948, it was already 1.16 km^{2}.

The end of World War II was marked by fighting between the retreating German army, which used Útěchov as a foothold, fortified itself there on 23 April 1945 and turned the inn into a hospital, and the attacking Romanian army. The villagers mostly fled into the forests, but several people died. Shortly after the war, a cross was erected on the road to Vranov to commemorate the end of the fighting.

=== Modern era ===
After the liberation, the village was ruled by the communist party, who renovated house no. 15, which had burned down during the fighting in 1945, to house the local committee (MNV). Útěchov was electrified in 1947 and connected to the telephone network in 1949. The bus line Královo Pole - Soběšice was extended to Útěchov on September 1, 1952, and a municipal radio station was constructed in 1956. On July 1, 1953, Útěchov was enlarged to include a colony of houses at the northwestern corner of the forest, which had previously been part of Vranov. Collectivization of agriculture took place here in the second half of the 1950s: in 1957, a local unified agricultural cooperative was founded, but it only existed for a short time. In 1959, its property was transferred to the Jehnice municipal farm. The village had a local public library and a branch of the Socialist Youth Union. During the 1960s and 1970s, two fire tenders and a fire station were built, the inn and shop were reconstructed, the sports complex was renovated, public lighting was repaired and the park at the local committee was landscaped. These actions were often carried out with the help of citizens as part-time workers. In the 1970s–1980s, the Útěchov reservoir was built on the northern edge of the municipality, and nearby in Vranov, a plant for the Vranov forest of the Křtiny University of Agriculture. Between 1977 and 1980, the forest path Hrádková cesta, leading from Útěchov past Ronov Castle to Adamov, was converted into a road. In 1977, the existing name of the cadastral territory of Útěchov was supplemented with an epithet; since then it is named Útěchov u Brna (lit. 'Útěchov near Brno'). On 1 July 1980, Útěchov, as the last settlement to date, was incorporated into the Brno and became part of the Brno V district. In 1982, the streets in Útěchov were given names.

When Brno was reorganized after the Velvet Revolution, Útěchov became the city district of Brno-Útěchov on 24 November 1990. In 1992, the village was supplied with gas, and later a sewage system was also installed.

The population remained stagnant at around 200 until the early 1990s, with the number of houses increasing slightly. However, Útěchov experienced a huge construction boom in the 1990s. The number of inhabitants and houses increased approximately 3.5 times from 1991 to 2011. Many new streets were built here, and the village became a satellite settlement of Brno, consisting mainly of family houses and villas without civic amenities like a shop, doctor, post office, or cultural center. The vast majority of the unforested part of the land plot was built up by 2007. As of 2024, Útěchov has 20 streets.

== Geography ==
Útěchov is located in the northern part of Brno, 10 kilometers from the center of Brno; it is the northernmost part of this city. It lies on the road between Soběšice and the municipality of Vranov, 4 kilometers north of Soběšice, 2 kilometers northeast of Brno-Ořešín, 3 kilometers southeast of the municipality of Vranov, 2 kilometers southwest of the town of Adamov and 5 kilometers northwest of Bílovice nad Svitavou. It borders Brno-Ořešín to the west, Vranov to the north and northeast, Bílovice nad Svitavou to the south and southeast and Adamov at a single point to the east. Útěchov has an area of 1.18 km^{2}. Of this, in 2024, arable land accounted for 0.23 km^{2}, gardens 0.15 km^{2}, orchards 0.02 km^{2}, grasslands 0.02 km^{2}, forest land 0.62 km^{2}, built-up area 0.06 km^{2} and other area 0.09 km^{2}.

The village lies at the top of a prominent, completely forested ridge of Drahanská vrchovina, facing south towards Brno, which is bordered to the east by the Svitava river and to the west by the Rakovec and Ponávka rivers. The elevation of Útěchov ranges from 388 m in the southeast to 497 m in the north. The center of Útěchov near the town hall is located at an altitude of 465 m. The northernmost part of Útěchov, at an altitude of approximately 497 m above sea level, is also the highest point in the city of Brno. The only significant peak in Útěchov is a forested elevation of 475 m above sea level in the southern part of the area, by the road to Soběšice, referred to as Kněží hora (lit. 'Priest's Mountain').

According to the Quitt climate classification, Útěchov falls into the moderately warm MT11 region, and according to the Köppen climate classification, it belongs to the temperate oceanic climate Cfb.

== Administration ==
The city district of Brno-Útěchov includes the entire municipal part and cadastral territory of Útěchov u Brna. It is also coextensive with the basic settlement unit of Útěchov.

For Senate elections, Brno-Útěchov is included in electoral district 60 of Brno-City District.

== Demographics ==
In 1667, there were three settlers in Útěchov, and in 1675, four settlers farmed there. In 1750, there were seven settlers,one half-farmer, three quarter-farmers, and three housekeepers. In 1834, 86 people lived in fourteen houses, and in 1843, there were 97 inhabitants, of whom two half-farmers, three quarter-farmers, and seven housekeepers, and in 1850, there were a total of 121 people. Útěchov had always been majority Czech; the number of German-speaking inhabitants was minimal even until 1945, mostly zero.

Historical population

Year	Pop.	±%
1869	133	—
1880	151	+13.5%
1890	170	+12.6%
1900	174	+2.4%
1910	190	+9.2%

Year	Pop.	±%
1921	203	+6.8%
1930	175	−13.8%
1950	203	+16.0%
1961	193	−4.9%
1970	187	−3.1%

Year	Pop.	±%
1980	217	+16.0%
1991	211	−2.8%
2001	446	+111.4%
2011	760	+70.4%
2021	920	+21.1%

Source: Censuses

According to the 2021 census, there were 282 houses in Útěchov, of which 255 were inhabited. Of the total number of 282, 172 were built between 1991 and 2010. According to the 2021 census, Útěchov had 920 inhabitants, of which 449 were men and 471 were women. A total of 568 people reported Czech nationality, 197 Moravian, 13 Slovak nationality, 1 Polish, 1 German and 1 Russian; others did not report their nationality. 76 people belonged to the Roman Catholic Church, 5 people to the Evangelical Church of Czech Brethren, and 3 people to the Czechoslovak Hussite Church.

In terms of population, Útěchov is the second smallest city district of Brno.

== Economy ==
Útěchov is a satellite settlement without any larger establishments. In 2024, a total of 67 commercial companies and 197 businesses were registered in Útěchov.

== Transport ==
In the north–south direction, the road III/37915 passes through Útěchov, which forms the axis of the city district and at the same time the main road connection with the rest of Brno. This road starts in Brno on its ring road and continues through Lesná, Soběšice, Útěchov and Vranov to Šebrov-Kateřina. During the 2020 transport census, 3,118 motor vehicles passed through Útěchov on road III/37915 per day on average. The second publicly accessible connection is formed by Hrádková cesta, which starts on the northern edge of Útěchov, continues eastward and turns around Ronov Castle into the Svitava valley in Adamov.

== Education ==
Since the end of the 18th century, children of Útěchov have been educated in a one-classroom school in Vranov, which has changed several locations in the village over the years. The two-classroom school building in Vranov was built in 1885. No school institution was established in Útěchov even later. In 2023, the entire district was part of the catchment area of the Síčka kindergarten in Soběšice, the Zeiberlichova elementary school in Soběšice and the Blažkova elementary school and kndergarten in Lesná.

== Sights ==
=== Protected monuments ===
- Kaplička - The chapel from 1898 was built on the then edge of Útěchov in a historicist style and is an important element of the district. It is located at the intersection of Boří and V koutku streets, in close proximity to the oldest estates in Útěchov. It has been a cultural monument since 1996.
- Boží muka - The set of Baroque column shrines was created at the end of the 18th century (according to another source, only in the second half of the 19th century) along the pilgrimage route from Královo Pole to Vranov, an important pilgrimage site. Of the six pieces of these small sacral buildings, four are located in Útěchov and two in Vranov. They have been protected as monuments since 1964.

=== Other cultural monuments ===
- Cross commemorating the end of World War II in 1945 on Adamovská street
- Monument to those who fell during the liberation of Útěchov in 1945 on Adamovská street
- Monument to forest inspector Adolf Midloch from 1929, in a clearing in the forest near Midlochova street
- Modern house at Včelařská 15b from 2012

== Notable people ==
- Zděnek Dufek (born 1978), researcher, forensic expert and politician, deputy mayor of Brno-Útěchov in 2006-2010
- Stanislav Moša (born 1956), theatre and musical director, manager, lyricist, and librettist
- Miroslav Sládek (born 1950), politician, member of parliament, deputy mayor of Brno-Útěchov in 2002-2004
