= Rozhraní =

- Municipality
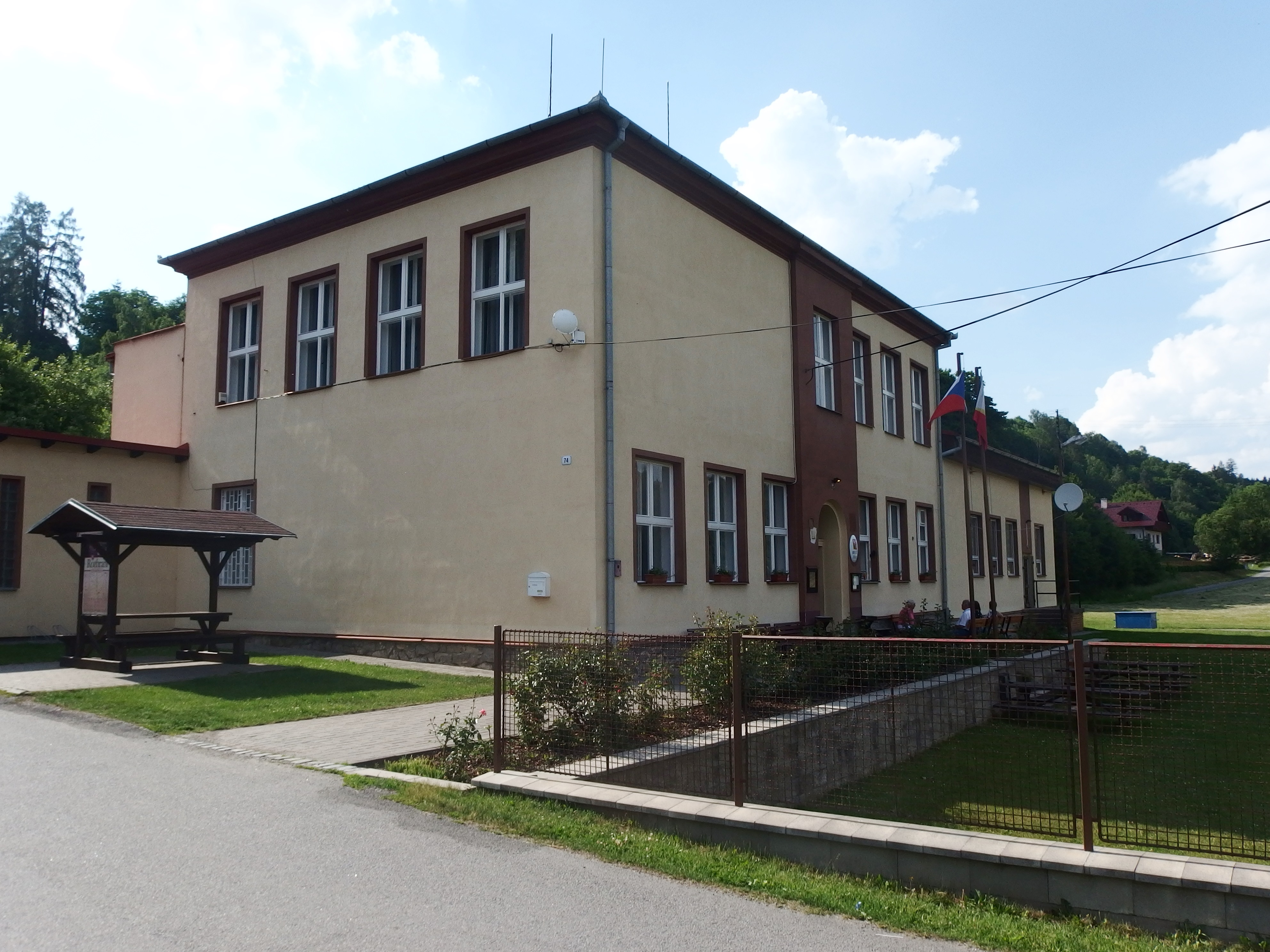
- Municipal office

- Flag Coat of arms

- Location in the Czech Republic
- Coordinates: 49°36′6″N 16°32′0″E
- Country: Czech Republic
- Region: Pardubice
- District: Svitavy
- First mentioned: 1593

Area
  - Total: 4.07 km^{2} (1.57 sq mi)
- Elevation: 372 m (1,220 ft)

Population (2026-01-01)
  - Total: 301
  - Density: 74.0/km^{2} (192/sq mi)
- Time zone: UTC+1 (CET)
  - Summer (DST): UTC+2 (CEST)
- Postal code: 569 03
- Website: www.rozhrani.cz

Rozhraní (German: Rossrein) is a municipality and village in Svitavy District in the Pardubice Region of the Czech Republic. It has about 300 inhabitants.

Rozhraní lies approximately 18 kilometres (11 mi) south of Svitavy, 45 km (28 mi) north of Brno, and 161 km (100 mi) east of Prague.

== Demographics ==
Historical population
Year	Pop.	±%
1869	632	—
1880	673	+6.5%
1890	722	+7.3%
1900	791	+9.6%
1910	779	−1.5%
1921	701	−10.0%
1930	761	+8.6%
1950	603	−20.8%
1961	607	+0.7%
1970	517	−14.8%
1980	430	−16.8%
1991	356	−17.2%
2001	356	+0.0%
2011	334	−6.2%
2021	308	−7.8%
Source: Censuses
