= Česká =

- Municipality
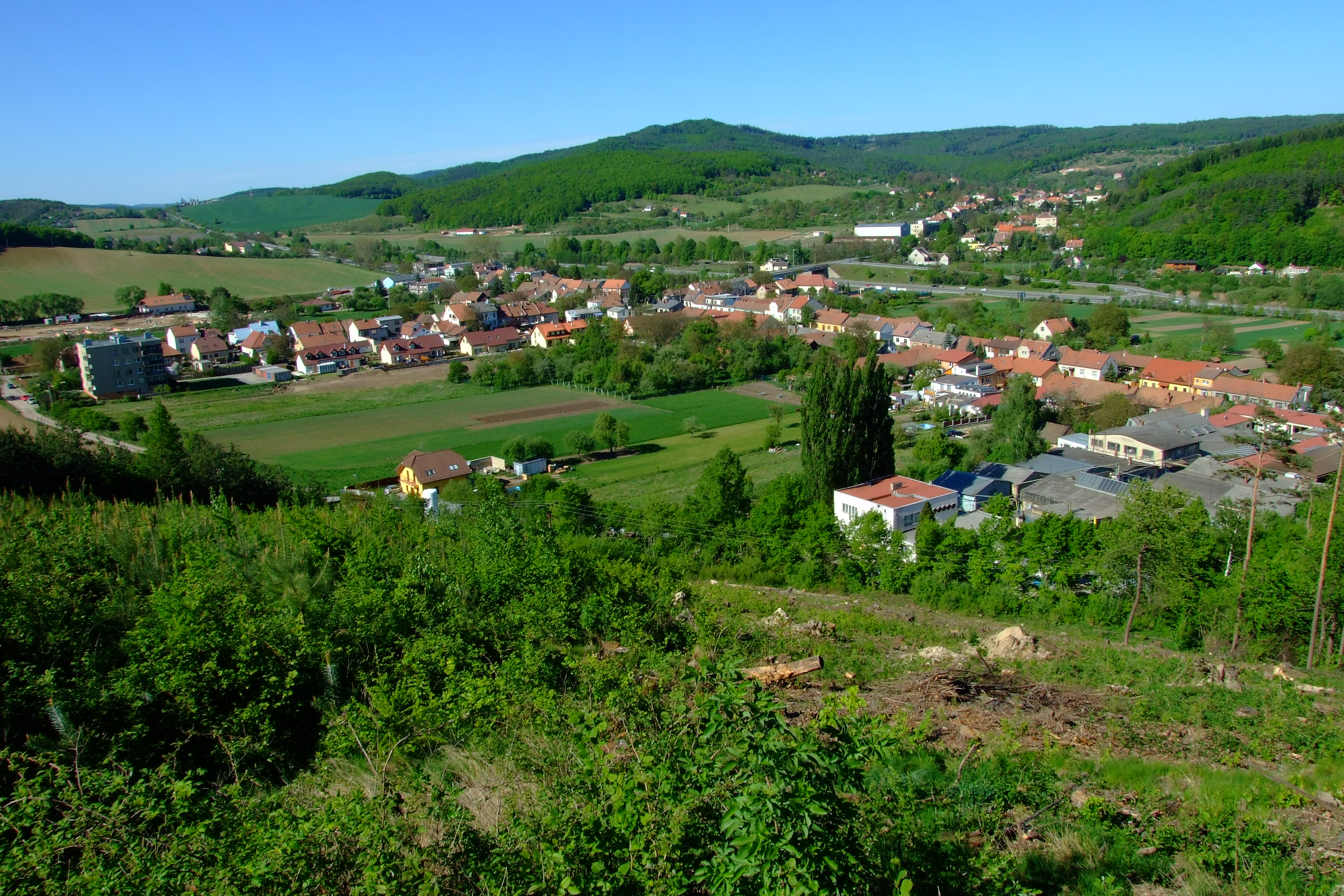
- General view

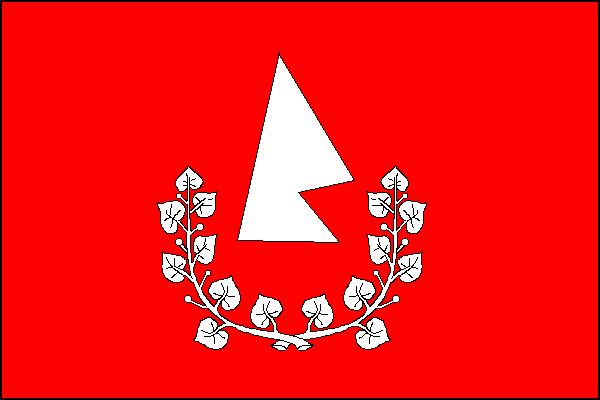
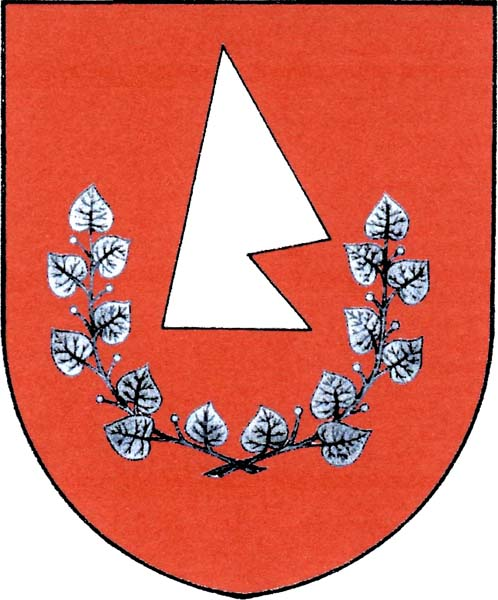
- Flag Coat of arms

- Location in the Czech Republic
- Coordinates: 49°16′48″N 16°33′56″E
- Country: Czech Republic
- Region: South Moravian
- District: Brno-Country
- First mentioned: 1784

Area
  - Total: 1.99 km^{2} (0.77 sq mi)
- Elevation: 295 m (968 ft)

Population (2026-01-01)
  - Total: 1,001
  - Density: 503/km^{2} (1,300/sq mi)
- Time zone: UTC+1 (CET)
  - Summer (DST): UTC+2 (CEST)
- Postal code: 664 31
- Website: www.ceska.cz

Česká is a municipality and village in Brno-Country District in the South Moravian Region of the Czech Republic. It has about 1,000 inhabitants.

Česká lies approximately 10 kilometres (6 mi) north-west of Brno and 179 km (111 mi) south-east of Prague.

== Demographics ==
Historical population
Year	Pop.	±%
1869	201	—
1880	201	+0.0%
1890	227	+12.9%
1900	233	+2.6%
1910	240	+3.0%
1921	241	+0.4%
1930	301	+24.9%
1950	487	+61.8%
1961	530	+8.8%
1970	527	−0.6%
1980	576	+9.3%
1991	524	−9.0%
2001	655	+25.0%
2011	989	+51.0%
2021	1,061	+7.3%
Source: Censuses
