= Lelekovice =

- Municipality
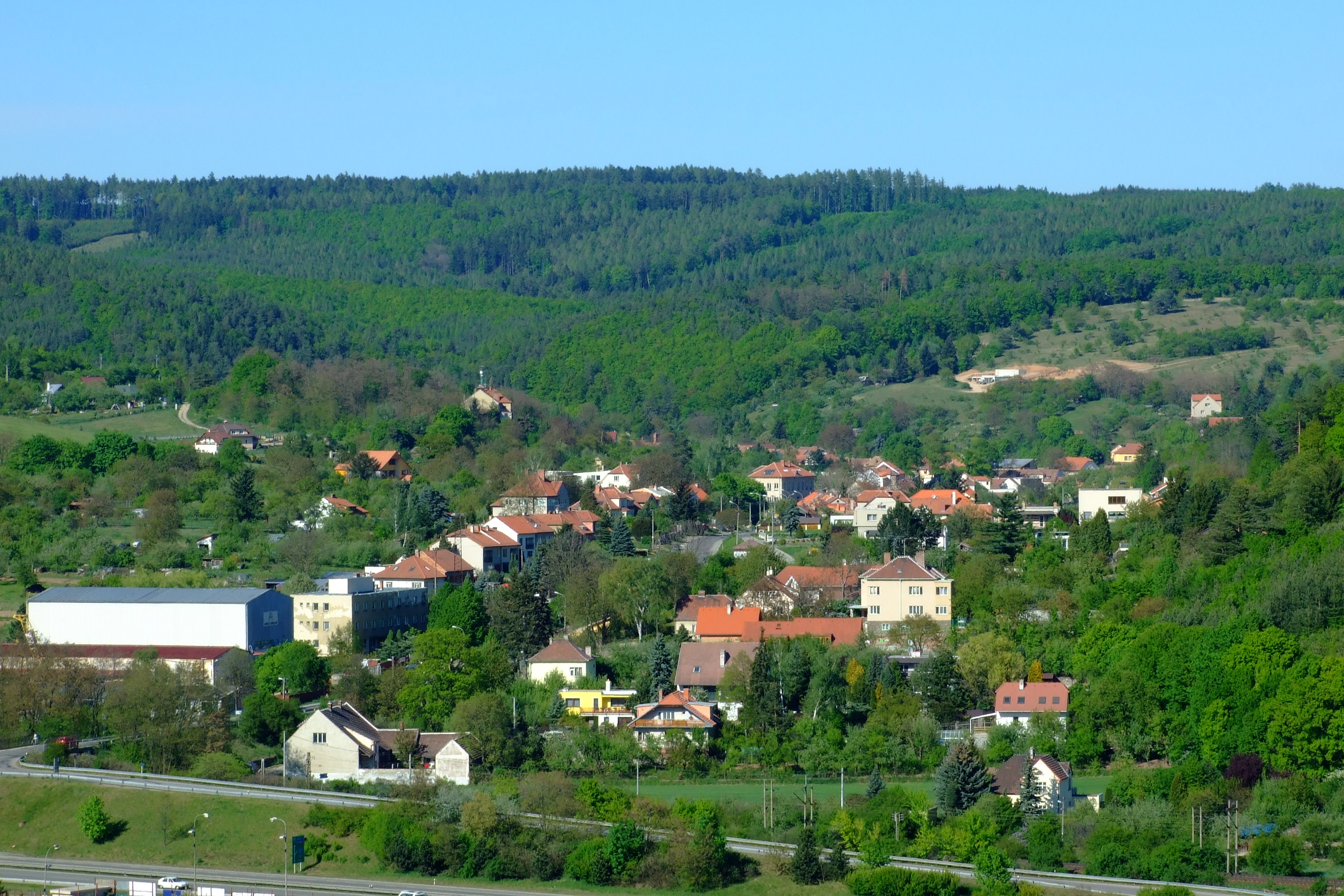
- General view

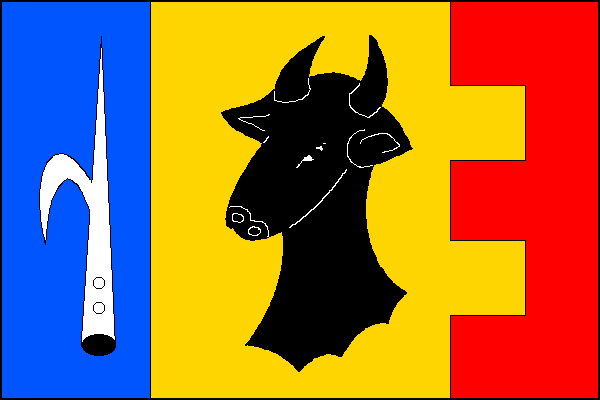
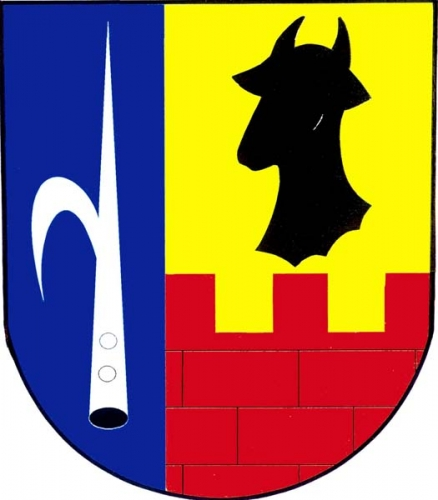
- Flag Coat of arms

- Location in the Czech Republic
- Coordinates: 49°17′36″N 16°34′44″E
- Country: Czech Republic
- Region: South Moravian
- District: Brno-Country
- First mentioned: 1288

Area
  - Total: 7.29 km^{2} (2.81 sq mi)
- Elevation: 312 m (1,024 ft)

Population (2026-01-01)
  - Total: 2,009
  - Density: 276/km^{2} (714/sq mi)
- Time zone: UTC+1 (CET)
  - Summer (DST): UTC+2 (CEST)
- Postal code: 664 31
- Website: www.lelekovice.cz

Lelekovice is a municipality and village in Brno-Country District in the South Moravian Region of the Czech Republic. It has about 2,000 inhabitants.

== Etymology ==
The origin of the name is unclear. It might be derived from lelek (meaning the bird 'nightjar' in Czech) or from the personal name Lelek, derived from the bird. According to other theories, it may have its root in the Old Czech verb leleti ('to wave', 'to sway') or in the Proto-Slavic word lělja ('godfather', 'father').

== Geography ==
Lelekovice is located about 9 kilometres (6 mi) north of Brno. It lies in the Drahany Highlands. The highest point is on the ridge Babí lom at 549 m (1,801 ft) above sea level. The Ponávka Stream flows through the municipality.

== History ==
The first written mention of Lelekovice is in a deed of the nobleman Hartman of Holštejn from 1288.

== Demographics ==
Historical population

Year	Pop.	±%
1869	604	—
1880	665	+10.1%
1890	696	+4.7%
1900	714	+2.6%
1910	806	+12.9%

Year	Pop.	±%
1921	952	+18.1%
1930	1,236	+29.8%
1950	1,220	−1.3%
1961	1,264	+3.6%
1970	1,216	−3.8%

Year	Pop.	±%
1980	1,227	+0.9%
1991	1,262	+2.9%
2001	1,362	+7.9%
2011	1,771	+30.0%
2021	1,889	+6.7%

Source: Censuses

== Transport ==
Lelekovice is served by the train station Česká, which is located on the railway lines Brno–Křižanov and Tišnov–Hustopeče. However, the station is situated just outside the municipality.

== Sights ==
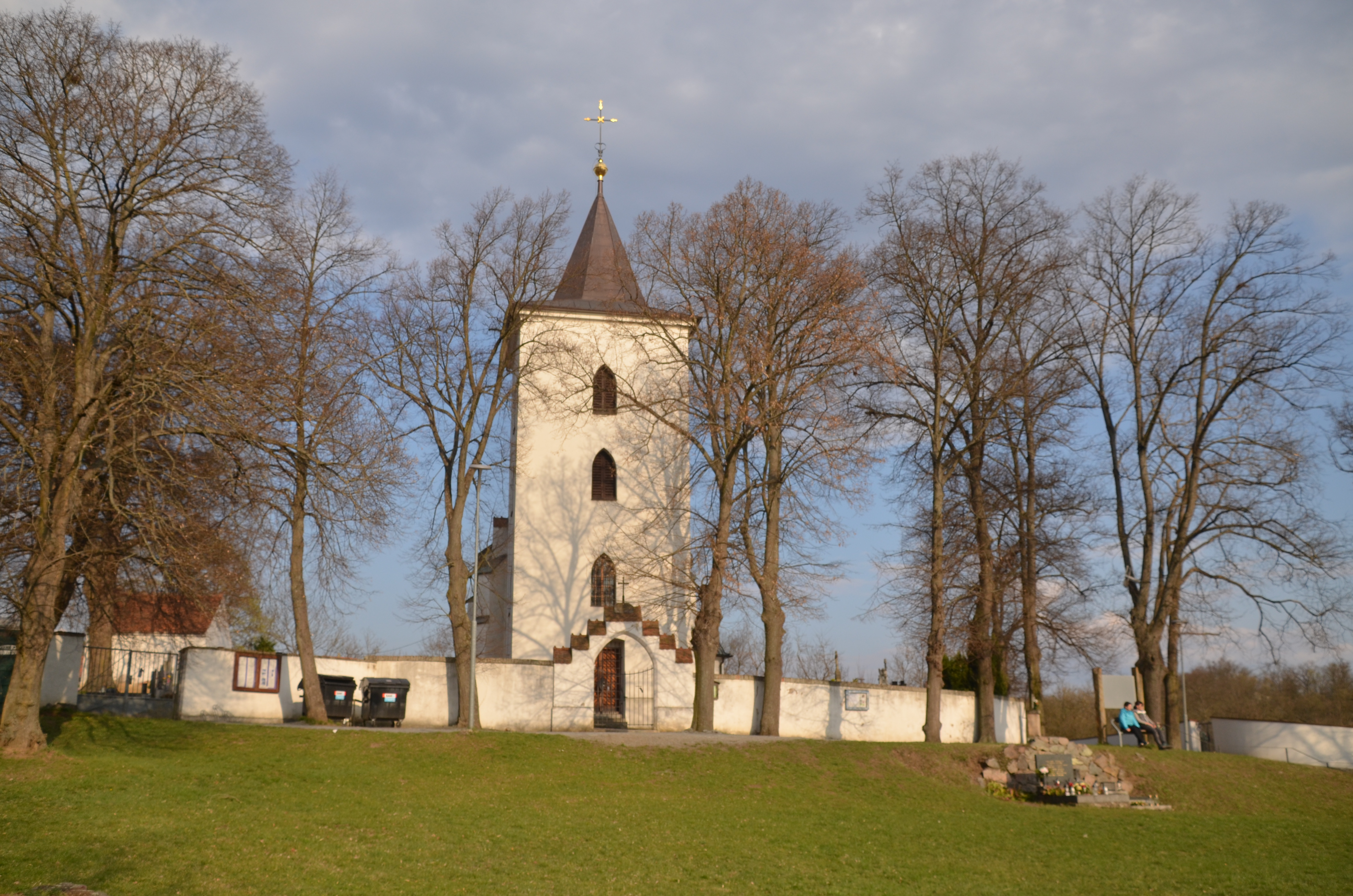
Church of Saints Philip and James

The main landmark of Lelekovice is the Church of Saints Philip and James. It is a valuable Gothic building with a Romanesque core, built on the site of a disappeared castle. Its present appearance is a result of neo-Gothic modifications.

On the ridge Babí lom is an eponymous observation tower. It is a concrete structure from 1961 and is 15 m (49 ft) high.

== Notable people ==
- Kamil Hornoch (born 1972), astronomer

== Honours ==
The asteroid 167208 Lelekovice was named in its honour by the co-discoverer Kamil Hornoch.
