= Jinačovice =

- Municipality
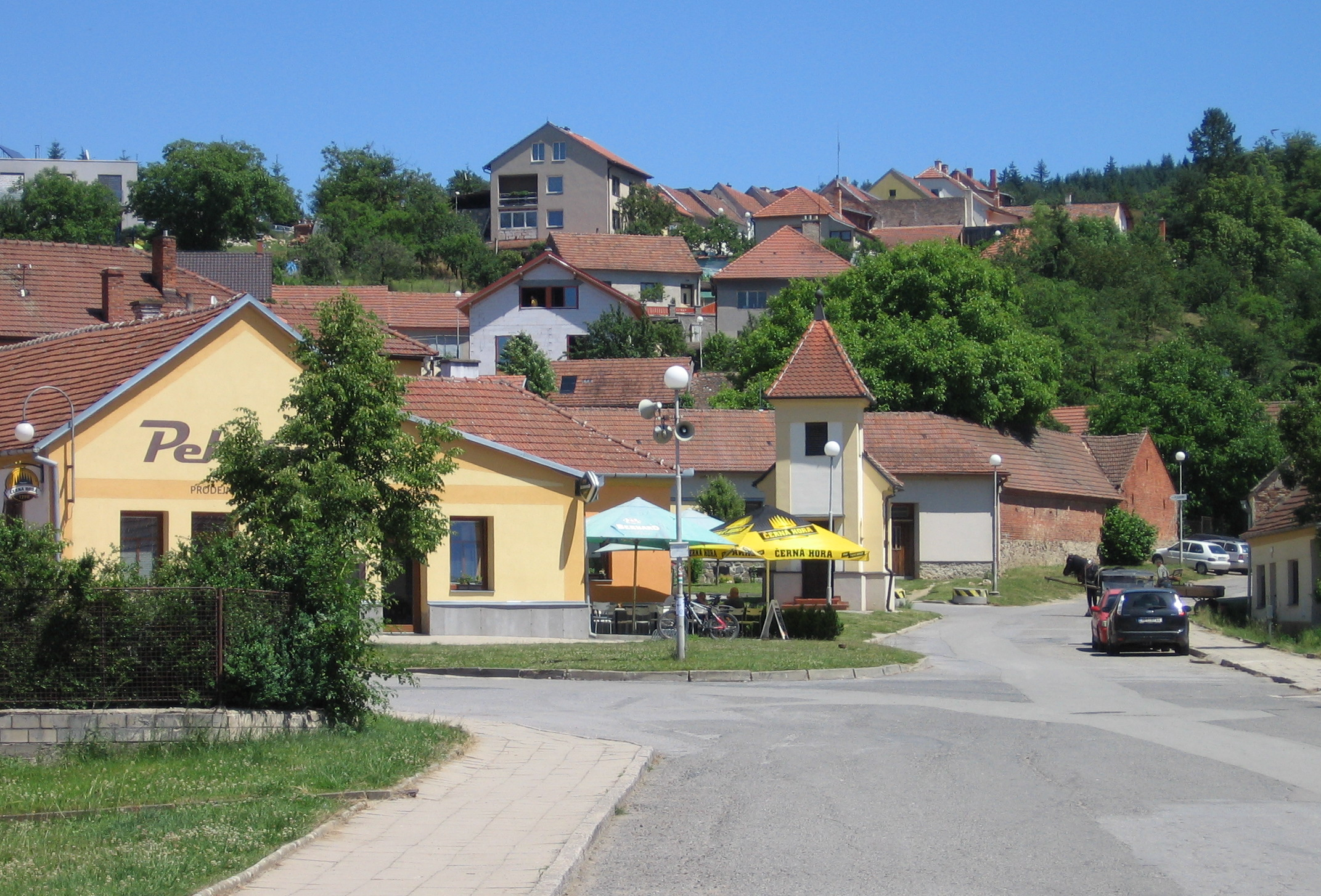
- Centre of Jinačovice

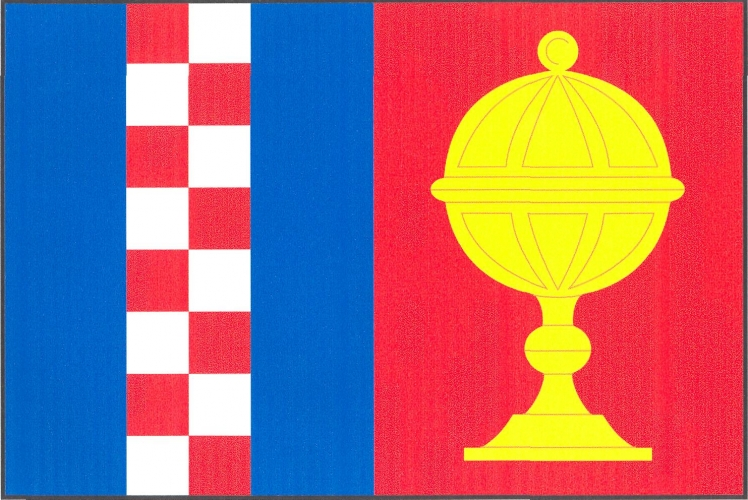
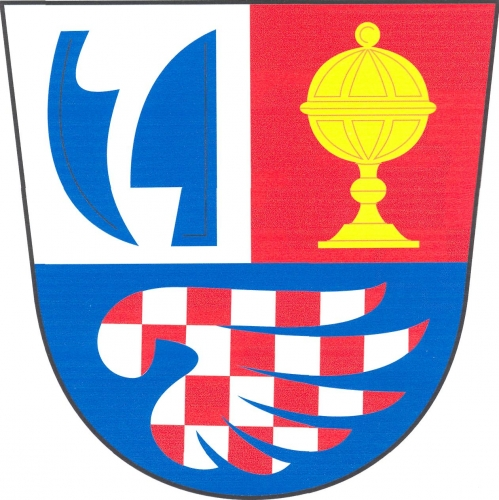
- Flag Coat of arms

- Location in the Czech Republic
- Coordinates: 49°16′4″N 16°31′46″E
- Country: Czech Republic
- Region: South Moravian
- District: Brno-Country
- First mentioned: 1358

Area
  - Total: 5.94 km^{2} (2.29 sq mi)
- Elevation: 305 m (1,001 ft)

Population (2026-01-01)
  - Total: 792
  - Density: 133/km^{2} (345/sq mi)
- Time zone: UTC+1 (CET)
  - Summer (DST): UTC+2 (CEST)
- Postal code: 664 34
- Website: www.jinacovice.eu

Jinačovice is a municipality and village in Brno-Country District in the South Moravian Region of the Czech Republic. It has about 800 inhabitants.

Jinačovice lies approximately 10 kilometres (6 mi) north-west of Brno and 178 km (111 mi) south-east of Prague.

== Demographics ==
Historical population
Year	Pop.	±%
1869	322	—
1880	370	+14.9%
1890	391	+5.7%
1900	436	+11.5%
1910	491	+12.6%
1921	531	+8.1%
1930	654	+23.2%
1950	591	−9.6%
1961	634	+7.3%
1970	585	−7.7%
1980	535	−8.5%
1991	495	−7.5%
2001	522	+5.5%
2011	609	+16.7%
2021	783	+28.6%
Source: Censuses
