= Brno-Řečkovice a Mokrá Hora =

- City District of Brno
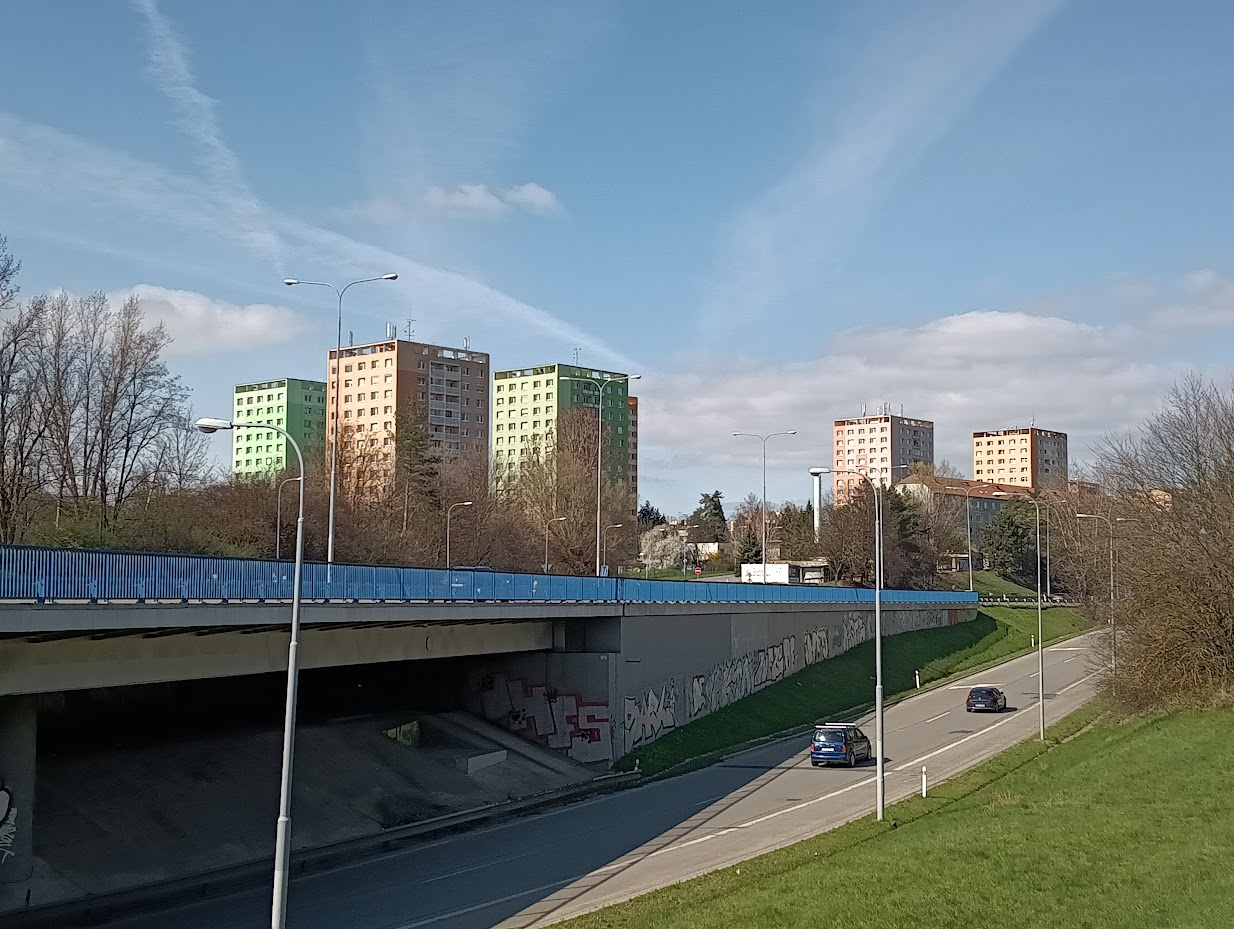
- Housing estate in Řečkovice

- Flag Coat of arms

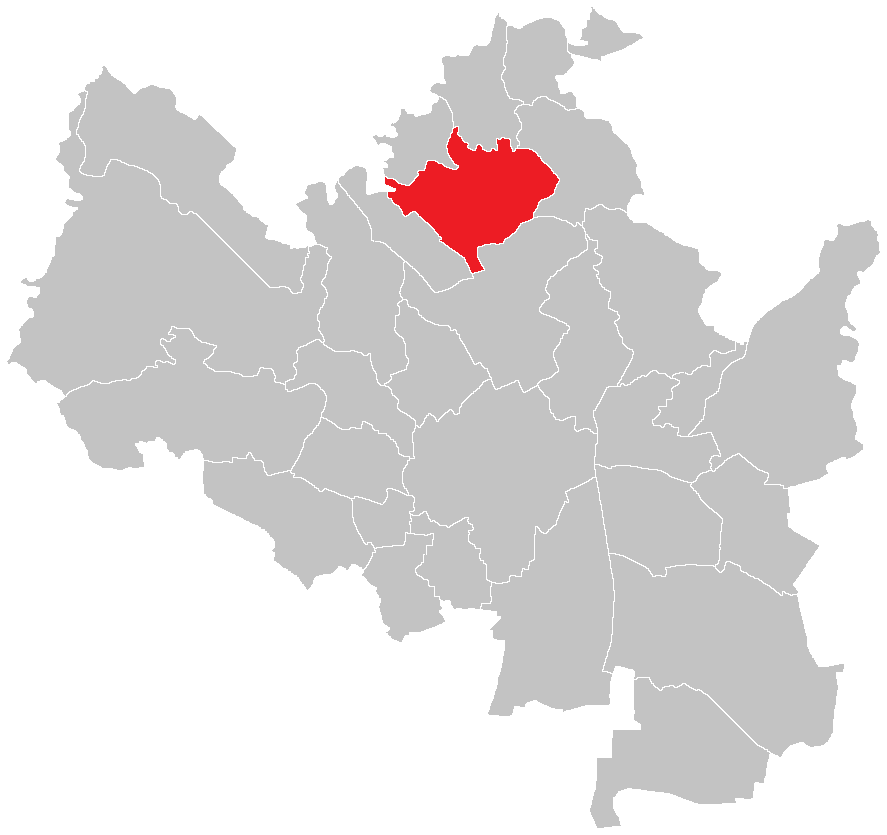
- Location of Brno-Řečkovice a Mokrá Hora in Brno 49°15′9″N 16°34′57″E
- Country: Czech Republic
- Region: South Moravian Region
- City: Brno

Government
  - Mayor: Marek Viskot (ČSSD)

Area
  - Total: 7.57 km^{2} (2.92 sq mi)

Population (2021)
  - Total: 15,127
  - Density: 2,000/km^{2} (5,180/sq mi)
- Time zone: UTC+1 (CET)
  - Summer (DST): UTC+2 (CEST)
- Postal code: 621 00
- Website: http://www.reckovice.brno.cz/scripts/index.php

Brno-Řečkovice a Mokrá Hora is a city district of Brno, Czech Republic, located in the northern part of the city. It is made up of the cadastral territories of Řečkovice and Mokrá Hora. It has a total area of 7.57 km^{2}. The city district was formed on November 24, 1990. Over 15,000 people live there.

For the purposes of the senate elections, the territory of the district is included in electoral district number 60 of Brno-City District.

== History ==
The first written mention of Řečkovice dates from 1277, when Ottokar II of Bohemia donated the courtyard of the St. John's Chapel to Špilberk. In 1784, the Mokrá Hora settlement was founded, which was part of the Jehnice municipality until December 31, 1952. On April 16, 1919, Řečkovice, together with 22 other municipalities, were annexed to Brno. On July 1, 1960, the municipality of Mokrá Hora was annexed to Brno. The current municipal district of Brno-Řečkovice a Mokrá Hora was established on November 24, 1990.

== Description ==
The altitude of the town varies between 226 and 398 m above sea level. Of its two parts, the Řečkovice district, which is significantly larger and more southerly, has an urban character, while Mokrá Hora, which is much smaller and lies east of the railway line, is more of a village. The most important local company from the middle of the 20th century until its liquidation in 2011 was the pharmaceutical company Lachema, whose premises are located on the eastern edge of the Řečkovice development. There are extensive forests at the eastern edge of the town.

== Territorial divisions ==
Brno-Řečkovice a Mokrá Hora is divided into the cadastral territories of Řečkovice and Mokrá Hora, the former of which is then further divided into 12 basic settlement units.

Cadastral territory Basic settlement unit	Population (2011)	Population (2021)	Change
Řečkovice	14,585	14,262	-2.2%
Banskobystrická	3,048	3,062	+0.4%
Dolnice	530	478	-9.8%
Družstevní	2,348	2,439	+3.9%
Horácké náměstí	3,718	3,554	-4.4%
Palackého náměstí	1,903	1,682	-11.6%
Pod Malou Babou	73	53	-27.4%
Řečkovice-nádraží	7	6	-14.3%
Řečkovice-za nádražím	4	11	+175.0%
Řečkovický mlýn	37	33	-10.8%
Sídliště Hapalova	851	799	-6.1%
U Kuřimské	1,550	1,532	-1.1%
Žilkova	516	613	+18.8%
Mokrá Hora	901	865	-4.0%

== Demographics ==
Historical population

Year	Pop.	±%
1869	1,085	—
1880	1,237	+14.0%
1890	1,360	+9.9%
1900	1,632	+20.0%
1910	2,549	+56.2%

Year	Pop.	±%
1921	2,880	+13.0%
1930	4,953	+72.0%
1950	6,139	+23.9%
1961	6,943	+13.1%
1970	7,478	+7.7%

Year	Pop.	±%
1980	17,729	+137.1%
1991	15,804	−10.9%
2001	14,991	−5.1%
2011	15,486	+3.3%
2021	15,127	−2.3%

Source: Censuses
