= Brno-Jehnice =

- City District of Brno
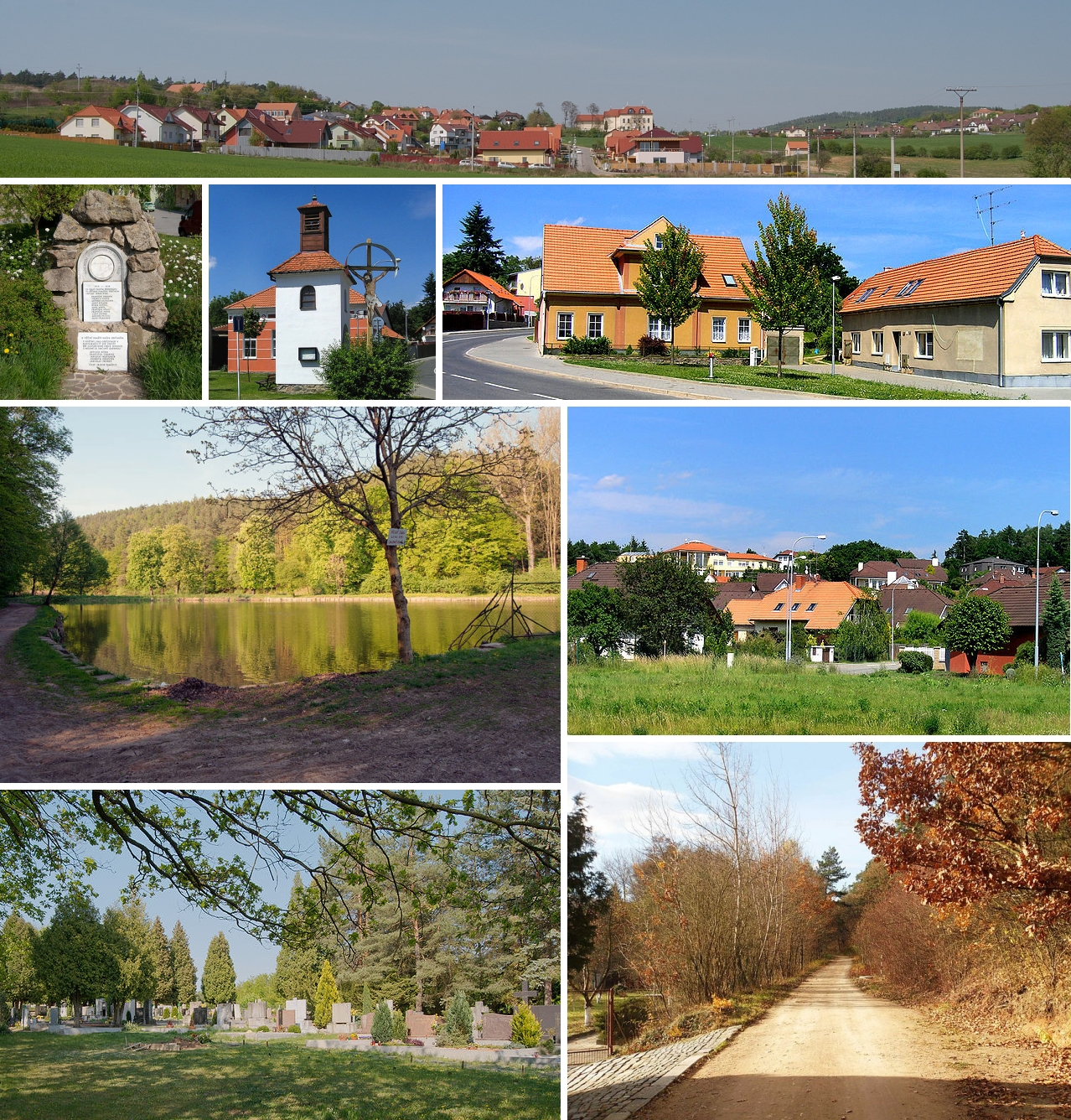
- • Above: View of Jehnice from the south • Left 1 (left): Monument to the victims of wars • Left 1 (right): Belfry on Nám. 3. května • Left 2: Pond U Lesa • Left 3: Jehnice cemetery • Right 1: Blanenská Street • Right 2: Family suburban development • Right 3: The former Brno–Tišnov line

- Flag Coat of arms

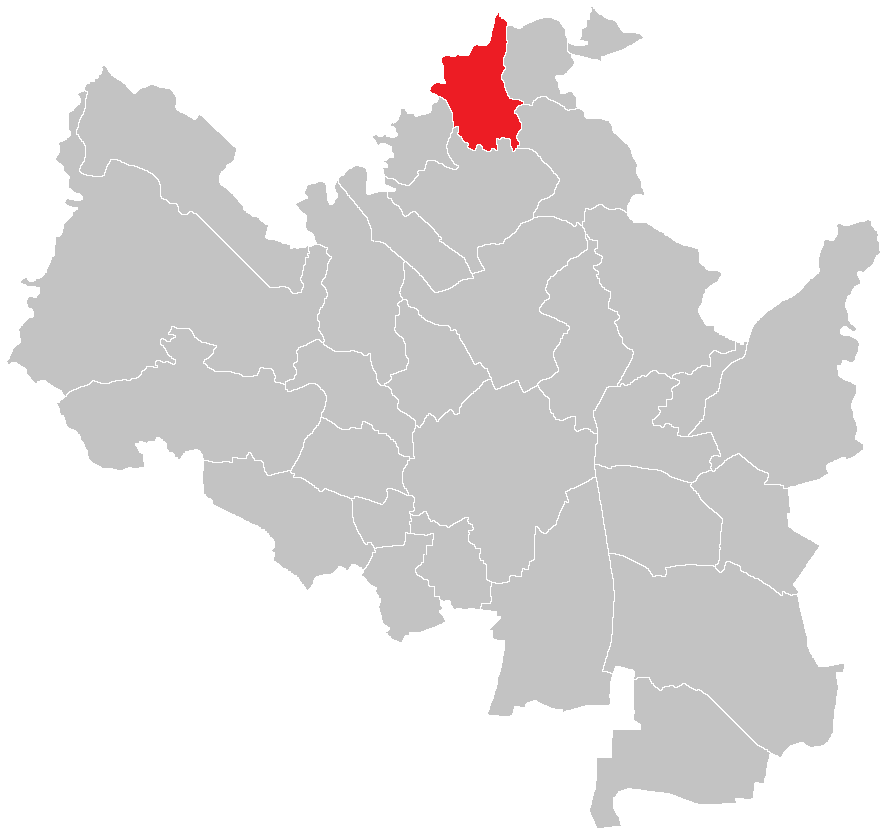
- Location of Brno-Jehnice in Brno
- Coordinates: 49°16′16″N 16°35′46″E
- Country: Czech Republic
- Region: South Moravian Region
- City: Brno

Government
  - Mayor: Oto Rinchenbach

Area
  - Total: 4.07 km^{2} (1.57 sq mi)

Population (2023)
  - Total: 1,136
  - Density: 279/km^{2} (723/sq mi)
- Time zone: UTC+1 (CET)
  - Summer (DST): UTC+2 (CEST)
- Postal code: 621 00
- Website: http://brno-jehnice.cz/

Brno-Jehnice is a city district of Brno in the Czech Republic. It is made up of the municipal part and cadastral territory of Jehnice, originally an independent municipality that became a part of Brno in 1971. Its cadastral territory has an area of 4.07 km² and about 1,100 inhabitants.

The first possible mention of Jehnice dates from 1292, in the following centuries the village belonged mainly to the Lichtenburgs and mainly to the Boskovices. Their property was acquired by the Liechtenstein family at the beginning of the 17th century. A part of the village has been a free manor since the Middle Ages, which was also purchased by the Lichtensteins at the end of the 18th century. In 1801, a small independent estate was created from Jehnice and Mokrá Hora, gradually with different owners. From the middle of the 19th century, Jehnice was an independent municipality, and in 1971 it became part of Brno. At the turn of the 20th and 21st centuries, a more extensive suburban development arose here.

Due to its forest character, the Jehnice area is used as a tourist and recreational facility for the residents of Brno. On the road to Vranov there is a listed church of God's torment, right in the village there is a bell tower and several other sights.

== Demographics ==
Historical population
Year	Pop.	±%
1869	271	—
1880	293	+8.1%
1890	342	+16.7%
1900	397	+16.1%
1910	460	+15.9%
1921	502	+9.1%
1930	675	+34.5%
1950	658	−2.5%
1961	656	−0.3%
1970	630	−4.0%
1980	614	−2.5%
1991	532	−13.4%
2001	752	+41.4%
2011	1,102	+46.5%
2021	1,090	−1.1%
2025	1,187	+8.9%
Source: Censuses, data.brno.cz
