= Vranov (Brno-Country District) =

- Municipality
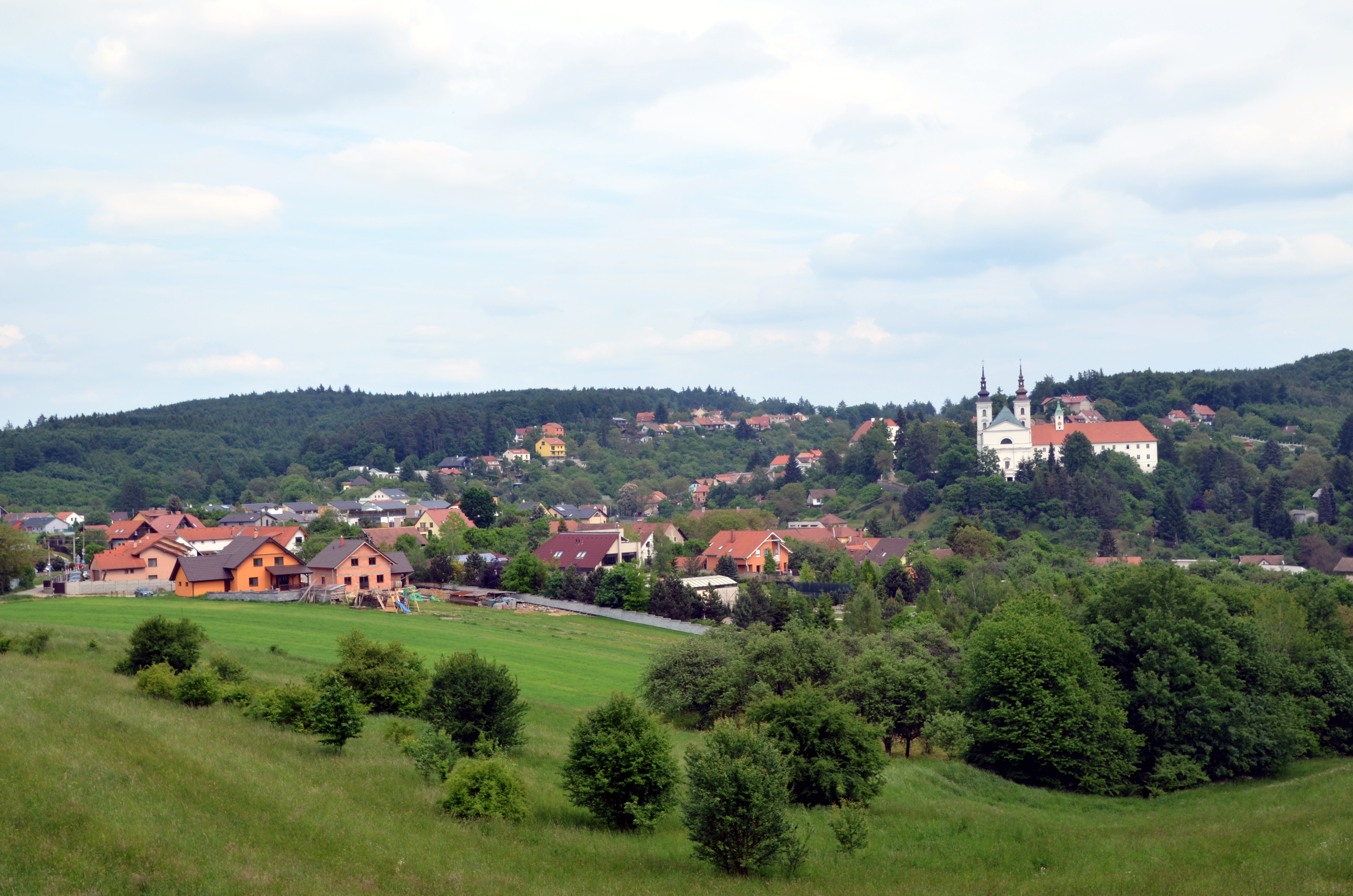
- General view

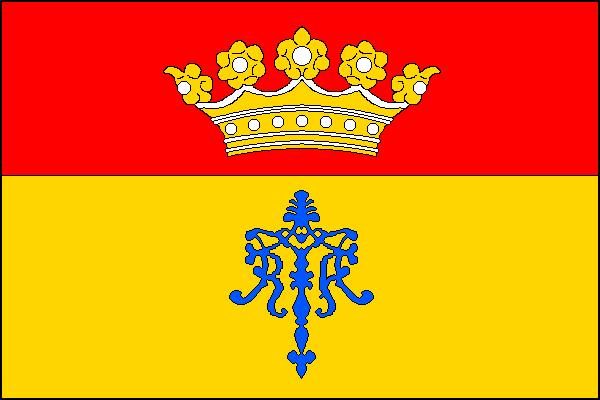
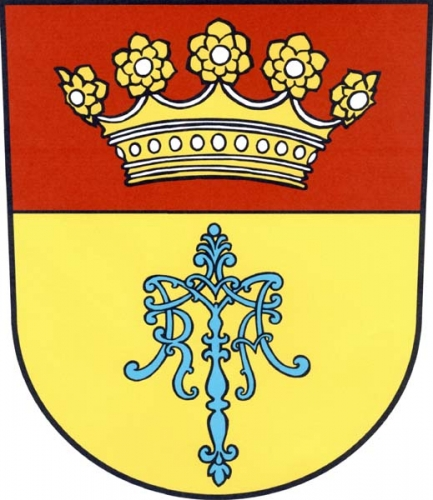
- Flag Coat of arms

- Location in the Czech Republic
- Coordinates: 49°18′33″N 16°36′50″E
- Country: Czech Republic
- Region: South Moravian
- District: Brno-Country
- First mentioned: 1365

Area
  - Total: 12.42 km^{2} (4.80 sq mi)
- Elevation: 440 m (1,440 ft)

Population (2026-01-01)
  - Total: 922
  - Density: 74.2/km^{2} (192/sq mi)
- Time zone: UTC+1 (CET)
  - Summer (DST): UTC+2 (CEST)
- Postal code: 664 32
- Website: www.vranov.cz

Vranov is a municipality and village in Brno-Country District in the South Moravian Region of the Czech Republic. It has about 900 inhabitants.

== Geography ==
Vranov is located about 10 kilometres (6 mi) north of Brno. It lies in the Drahany Highlands. The highest point is the hill Zavíravá at 525 m (1,722 ft) above sea level. The municipal territory is rich in small streams. The Svitava River forms the eastern municipal border.

== History ==
A church consecrated to the Mother of God was built here in 1240. The first written mention of Vranov is from 1365.

In 1622–1633, a Minims monastery with the pilgrimage Church of the Nativity of the Virgin Mary were founded here by Count Maximilian of Liechtenstein.

== Demographics ==
Historical population

Year	Pop.	±%
1869	544	—
1880	516	−5.1%
1890	529	+2.5%
1900	620	+17.2%
1910	651	+5.0%

Year	Pop.	±%
1921	575	−11.7%
1930	623	+8.3%
1950	676	+8.5%
1961	683	+1.0%
1970	657	−3.8%

Year	Pop.	±%
1980	634	−3.5%
1991	629	−0.8%
2001	595	−5.4%
2011	755	+26.9%
2021	916	+21.3%

Source: Censuses

== Transport ==
There are no railways or major roads passing through the municipality.

== Sport ==
Vranov is known for one of the oldest motocross tracks in the country called Vranovský žleb. It was built in 1966 and it is 1,820 m (5,970 ft) long.

== Sights ==
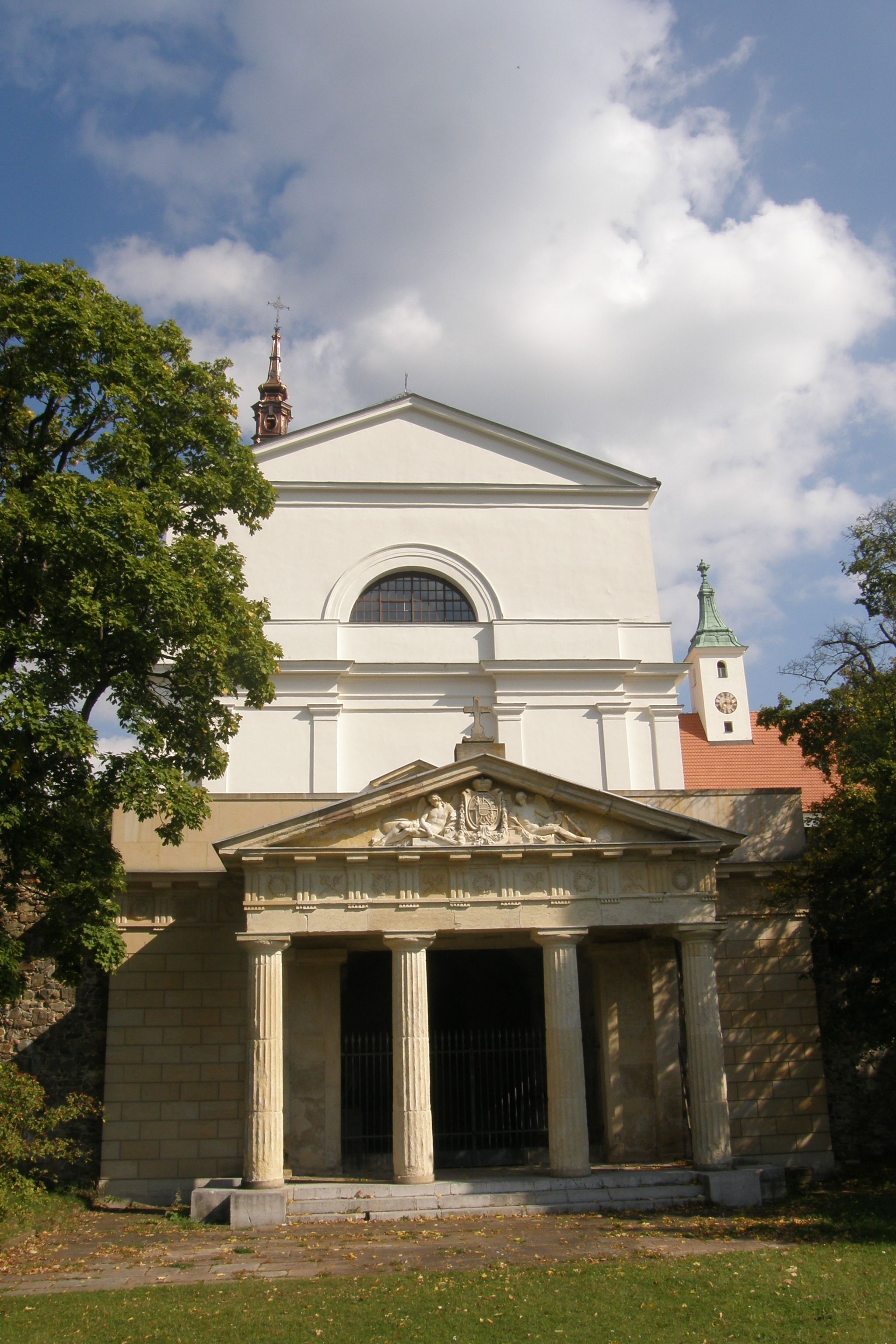
Liechtenstein tomb

The Church of the Nativity of the Virgin Mary was one of the first early Baroque structures in Moravia. In the crypt of the church is the family tomb of the Liechtenstein family. Extensive alterations to the temple and extensions of the family crypt were made in 1740–1821.

Today the monastery houses the Spiritual Centre, which offers accommodation services and organises spiritual, cultural and educational events.
