= Tuřany =

Tuřany may refer to places in the Czech Republic:

- Tuřany (Cheb District), a municipality and village in the Karlovy Vary Region
- Tuřany (Kladno District), a municipality and village in the Central Bohemian Region
- Brno-Tuřany, a city district of Brno
  - Brno-Tuřany Airport, an airport in Brno
  - Tuřany (Brno), a municipal part of Brno
