= Dolní Heršpice =

- Municipal part of Brno
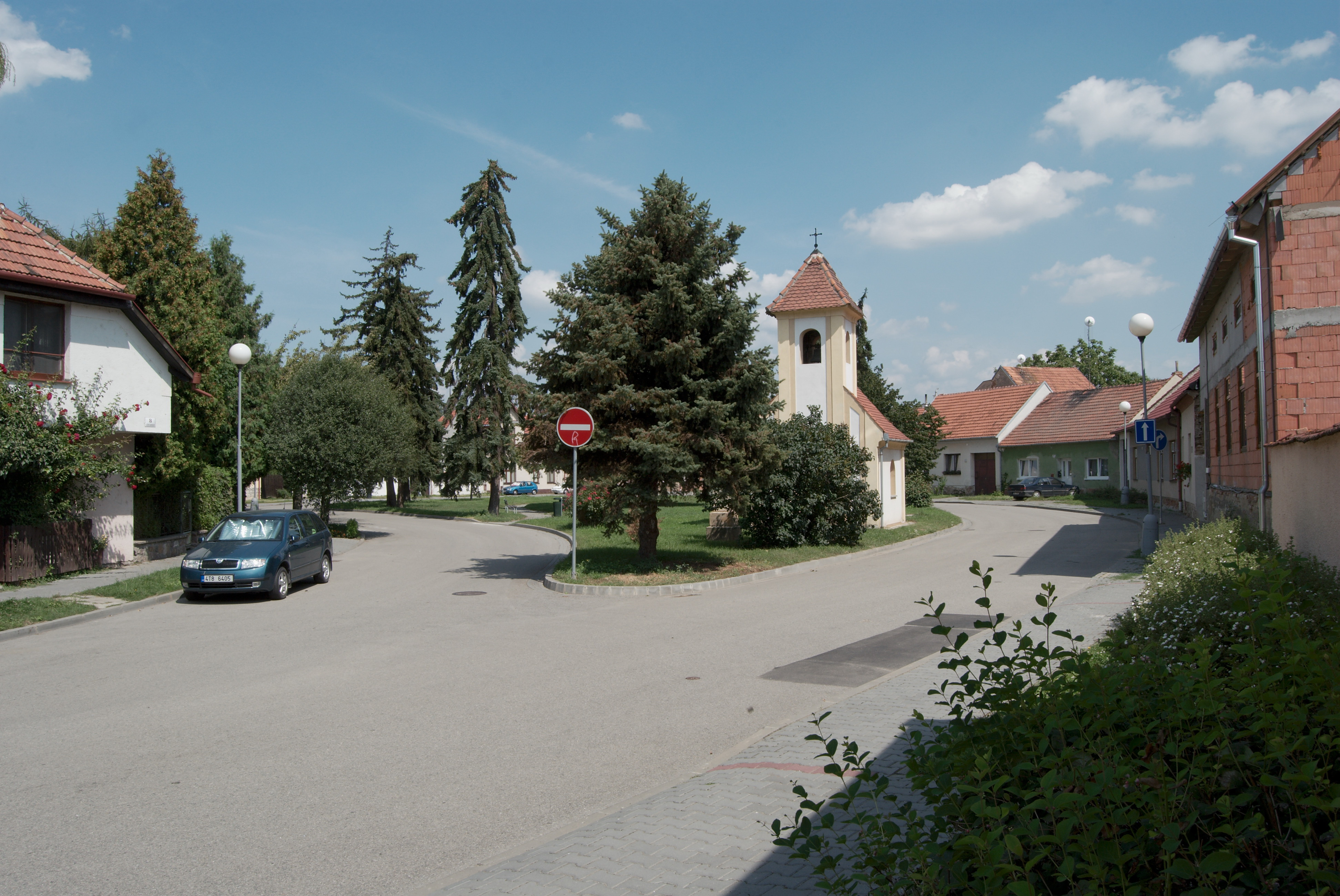
- Jižní náměstí

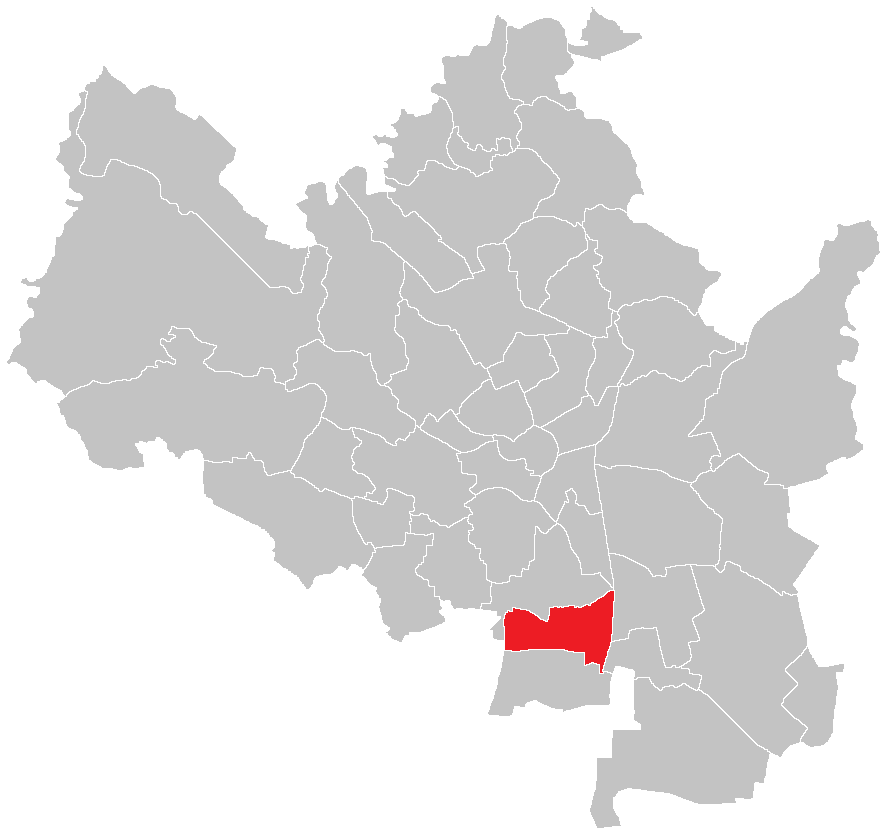
- Location of Dolní Heršpice in Brno
- Coordinates: 49°9′9″N 16°37′23″E
- Country: Czech Republic
- Region: South Moravian
- City: Brno
- City district: Brno-jih

Area
  - Total: 3.13 km^{2} (1.21 sq mi)

Population (2021)
  - Total: 813
  - Density: 260/km^{2} (673/sq mi)
- Time zone: UTC+1 (CET)
  - Summer (DST): UTC+2 (CEST)
- Postal code: 619 00

Dolní Heršpice (lit. 'Lower Heršpice'; German: Unter Gerspitz) is a municipal part and cadastral territory in the south of the city of Brno, Czech Republic. Originally its own municipality, it was annexed into Brno in 1919, since 24 November 1990 it has been part of the city district of Brno-jih. Over 800 people live here.

== Etymology ==
The original form of the village name was Jarošovice derived from the personal name Jaroš, which was a domestic form of one of the names beginning with Jaro- (Jaroslav, Jaromír, Jarohněv, etc.). The meaning of the name was "Jaroš's people". Heršpice developed from the German variant of the name (Jerspitz), which, among other things, shows a typical south Moravian substitution of the Czech ending -šovice for the German -spitz.

== Geography ==
Dolní Heršpice has an area of 3.13 km^{2}. It lies west of the Svratka River.

In the south, Dolní Heršpice borders the cadastral territory of Přízřenice, in the west with the municipality of Moravany and the cadastral territory of Horní Heršpice in the northwest, and in the east with Brněnské Ivanovice and Holásky.

== History ==
Dolní Heršpice was originally called Jerošovice or Jarošovice, later Jeršice or Jeršpice. After further modification and corruption of the original name, the current name Dolní Heršpice (meaning Lower Heršpice) was finally created.

Dolní Heršpice became part of Brno on 16 April 1919. On 1 January 1947, Dolní Heršpice was incorporated into the Brno VIII district, within which it remained until 30 September 1949. From 1 October 1949 to 30 April 1954, Dolní Heršpice cadastre was part of the Brno XI district. From 1 May 1954, Dolní Heršpice was part of the Brno IX district. Its name was changed to Brno IX-Horní Heršpice on 1 June 1957. In 1960, it became the city district of Horní Heršpice, renamed in 1971 to Brno IX. Horní Heršpice. In the second half of the 1960s, during the second cadastral reform of Brno, the boundaries of Dolní Heršpice were adjusted to their current form. As part of this reform, adjustments were made to the border with Horní Heršpice, and small peripheral parts of the original territories of Brněnské Ivanovice, Holásky and Přízřenice were added to Dolní Heršpice.

In 1975, the city district "Brno IX. Horní Heršpice" was canceled and the entire Dolní Heršpice cadastral territory was then part of the Brno IV district until 1990. Since 24 November 1990, Dolní Heršpice is part of the city district of Brno-jih.

== Description ==
Similar to neighbouring Přízřenice, the development of Dolní Heršpice also consists of two distinctly separate parts. On the one hand, it is the western mainly commercial and industrial part extending along Vídeňská street, which is crossed by the important multi-lane I/52 road, through the centre of which is the route of tram line number 2. To the west of this street is the large shopping centre Futurum Brno.

In the southwest of Dolní Heršpice, there are garden plots, following on from similar plots in neighbouring Přízřenice. The other eastern part of the Přízřenice development is made up of the original village, located on the right bank of the Svratka, and on the left bank of the Svratka, the area of Avion Shopping Park Brno. As in the case of Přízřenice, large areas of arable land lie between the two parts of Dolní Heršpice, which to a much lesser extent also lie on the eastern edge of Dolní Heršpice. The core of the original village is the Jižní náměstí Square, where the chapel of St. Catherine of Siena. In the past, there was also a pond next to it in the centre of this square. East of the original village, a cycle path runs along the banks of the Svratka.

== Demographics ==
Historical population

Year	Pop.	±%
1869	314	—
1880	354	+12.7%
1890	401	+13.3%
1900	396	−1.2%
1910	470	+18.7%

Year	Pop.	±%
1921	473	+0.6%
1930	573	+21.1%
1950	494	−13.8%
1961	441	−10.7%
1970	382	−13.4%

Year	Pop.	±%
1980	330	−13.6%
1991	305	−7.6%
2001	361	+18.4%
2011	595	+64.8%
2021	813	+36.6%

Source: Censuses

== Economy ==
In 2008, the Cubbe residential park was built on the right bank of the Svratka.

== Transport ==
The D1 and D2 motorways pass through Dolní Heršpice and cross there.
