= Přízřenice =

- Cadastral territory of Brno
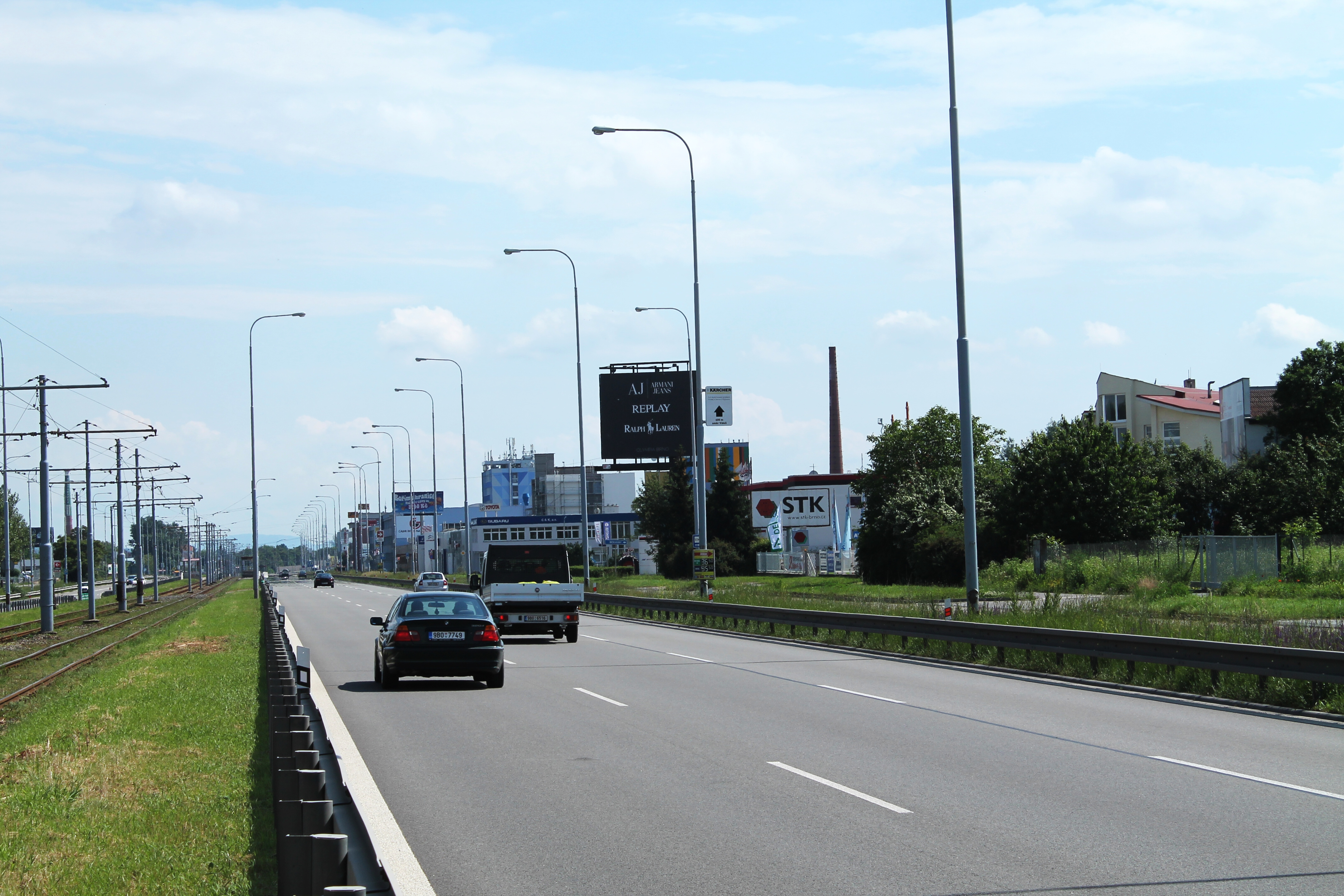
- Motorway on Vídeňská street

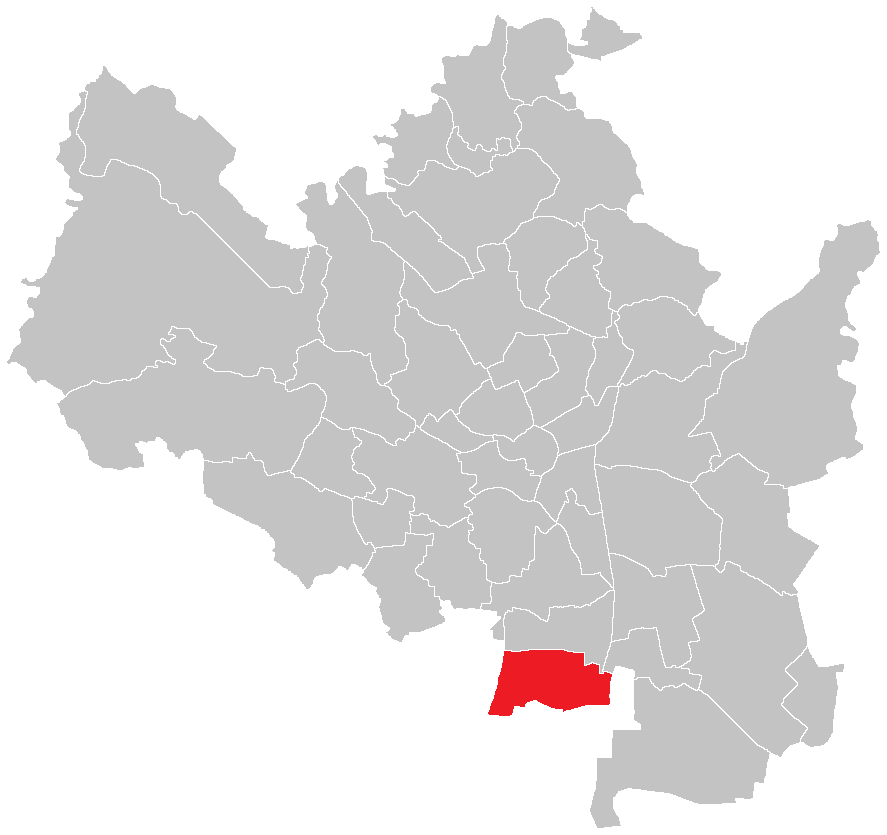
- Location of Přízřenice in Brno 49°8′39″N 16°37′21″E
- Country: Czech Republic
- Region: South Moravian Region
- City: Brno
- City district: Brno-jih

Area
  - Total: 3.82 km^{2} (1.47 sq mi)

Population (2021)
  - Total: 1,186
  - Density: 310/km^{2} (804/sq mi)
- Time zone: UTC+1 (CET)
  - Summer (DST): UTC+2 (CEST)
- Postal code: 619 00

Přízřenice (German: Priesenitz) is a municipal part and cadastral territory in the south of the city of Brno, Czech Republic. Its area is 3.82 km². Originally its own municipality, it was annexed to Brno in 1919, and since 24 November 1990 it is part of the city district of Brno-jih. It has almost 1,200 inhabitants.

== History ==
Přízřenice became part of Brno on April 16, 1919. In 1975, Přízřenice became part of the Brno IV district, which existed until 1990. Since November 24, 1990, Přízřenice has been part of the city district of Brno-jih.

On September 12, 2010, a local referendum was held in Dolní Heršpice and Přízřenice on separation from Brno and the creation of a new municipality, Dolní Heršpice-Přízřenice, which however failed.

== Description ==
Similar to neighboring Dolní Heršpice, the development of Přízřenice consists of two distinctly separate parts. The western part is a commercial and industrial zone extending along both sides of Vídeňská street, through which the route of the multi-lane road E461 passes, in the middle of which is the route of tram line number 2. West of Vídeňská street, in the northwestern part of Přízřenice, there are a number of garden plots connecting to similar plots in Dolní Heršpice. The eastern part is the original village, which still retains its original character and is among the best-preserved village units in modern Brno. Between both parts, but also in the southwest and east of Přízřenice, there are extensive areas of arable land. A short section of the D2 motorway runs through the eastern edge of Přízřenice, and part of the Olympia shopping center also extends here.

== Geography ==
Přízřenice is located west of the river Svratka, near its confluence with the river Svitava.

Přízřenice borders the municipality of Modřice in the south and southeast, Moravany in the west, the cadastral territory of Dolní Heršpice in the north, and Holásky in the northeast.

== Territorial divisions ==
The cadastral territory of Přízřenice is further divided into 3 basic settlement units.

Basic settlement unit	Population		
Basic settlement unit	2011	2021	Change
Přízřenice	692	842	+21.7%
Vídeňská-jih	173	199	+15.0%
Přízřenice-zahrádky	40	145	+262.5%

== Demographics ==
Historical population

Year	Pop.	±%
1869	433	—
1880	516	+19.2%
1890	574	+11.2%
1900	475	−17.2%
1910	549	+15.6%

Year	Pop.	±%
1921	543	−1.1%
1930	660	+21.5%
1950	616	−6.7%
1961	633	+2.8%
1970	585	−7.6%

Year	Pop.	±%
1980	486	−16.9%
1991	469	−3.5%
2001	572	+22.0%
2011	905	+58.2%
2021	1,186	+31.0%

Source: Censuses

== Transport ==
The bus lines 49 and N94 (operating at night time) pass through Přízřenice.
