= Horní Heršpice =

- Cadastral territory of Brno
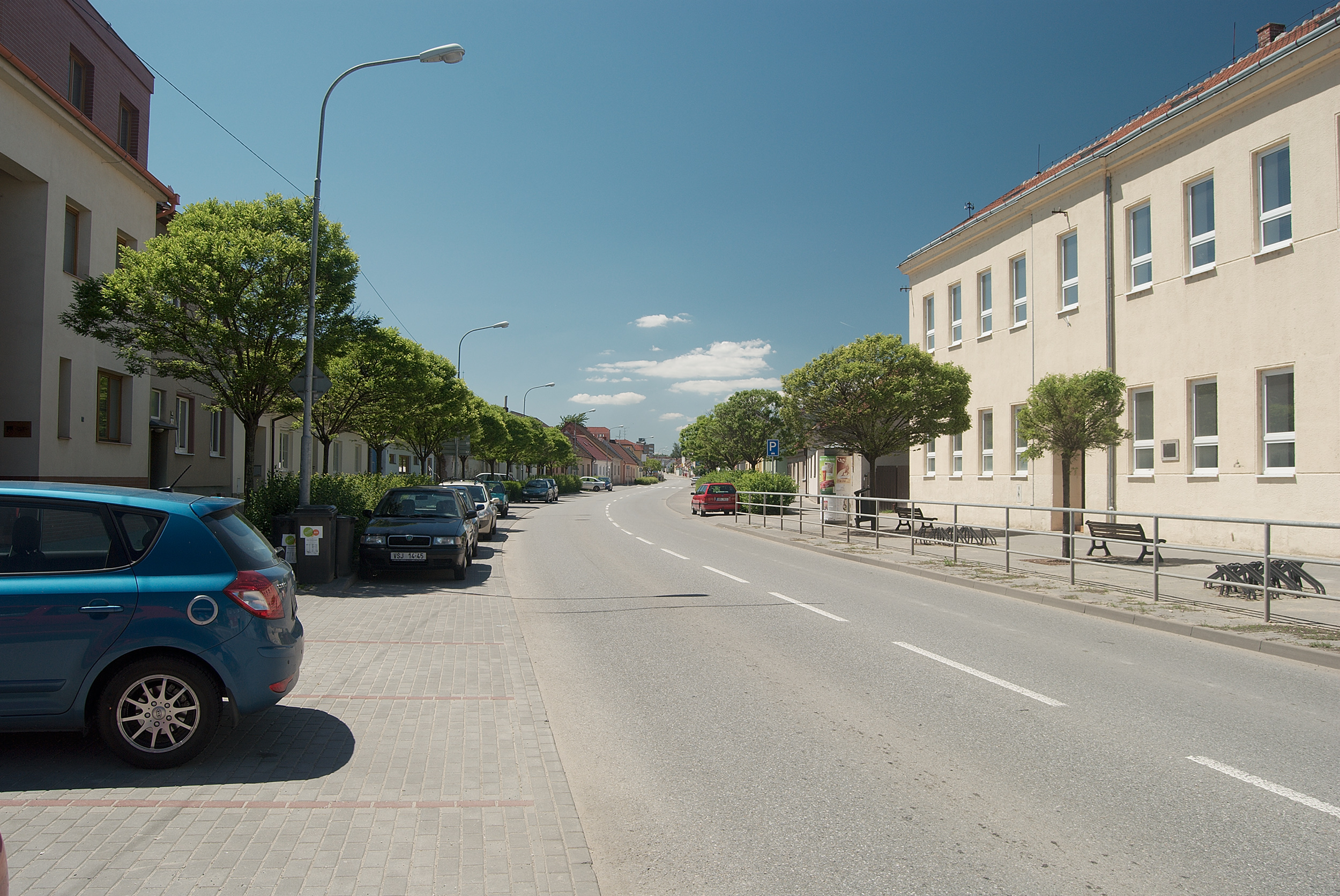
- Sokolova street

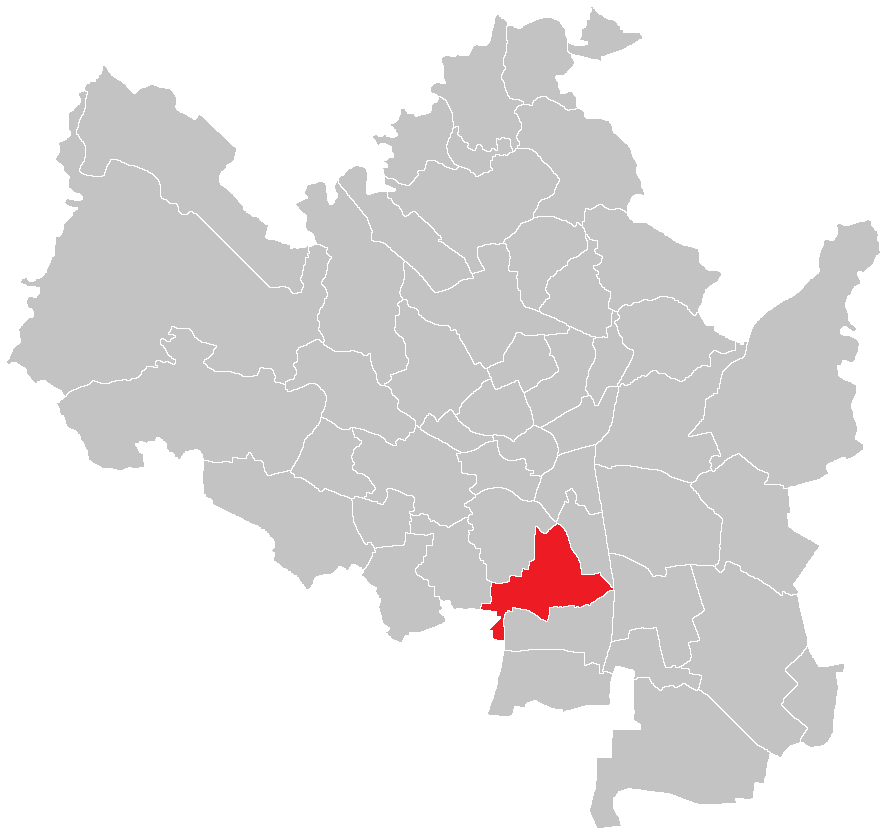
- Location of Horní Heršpice in Brno 49°9′54″N 16°36′48″E
- Country: Czech Republic
- Region: South Moravian Region
- City: Brno
- City district: Brno-jih

Area
  - Total: 3.77 km^{2} (1.46 sq mi)

Population (2021)
  - Total: 2,114
  - Density: 561/km^{2} (1,450/sq mi)
- Time zone: UTC+1 (CET)
  - Summer (DST): UTC+2 (CEST)
- Postal code: 619 00

Horní Heršpice (German: Ober Gerspitz, lit. 'Upper Heršpice') is a municipal part and cadastral territory in the south part of the city of Brno, Czech Republic. It has an area of 3.77 km^{2}. Originally its own municipality, it was annexed into Brno in 1919, since November 24, 1990 it has been part of the city district of Brno-jih. About 2,100 people live here.

== Etymology ==
The original form of the village name was Jarošovici (later Jarošovice) derived from the personal name Jaroš, which was a domestic form of one of the names beginning with Jaro (Jaroslav, Jaromír, Jarohněv, etc.). The meaning of the local name was "Jaroš's people". Heršpice developed from the German variant of the name (Jerspitz), which, among other things, shows a typical south Moravian substitution of the Czech ending -šovice for the German -spitz.

== History ==
The first mention of Horní Heršpice dates from 1289. During the Siege of Brno in 1645, the Swedes camped here and during their retreat they completely destroyed the village. After its restoration, Horní Heršpice began to become more and more Germanized. In 1839 the north–south route of the Brno-Břeclav railway line was built at the then western edge of the village. In the years 1854–1856, a new line to Rosice was connected to this line from the west. In the years 1867–1870, a section of another railway line to Přerov was built on the northern edge of Horní Heršpice. The favorable location of the village at that time near Brno led to its rapid growth, especially in the late 19th and early 20th centuries, so that a completely new development Nové Heršpice (New Heršpice) was created west of the railway line from Brno to Břeclav. From 1883 to 1915, the northern border of Horní Heršpice repeatedly underwent the biggest changes in favor of Brno. Here, until 1882, they originally owned most of the land of the area of the Brno Central Cemetery created that year, as well as a large part of the territory of the modern Štýřice district. When the border of Brno was adjusted in 1915, Brno also acquired a very small part of the modern cadastre of Horní Heršpice, which was incorporated into the newly created cadastral territory of Staré Brno a Vídeňka. With the exception of Nové Moravany, attached to Brno until July 1, 1960, the rest of Horní Heršpice was annexed to Brno on April 16, 1919. Horní Heršpice acquired its current borders only during the territorial reform of Brno in the late 1960s, when Horní Heršpice acquired the entire abolished cadastral territory of Nové Moravany and the peripheral parts of Brněnské Ivanovice (Královka center), Bohunice, Dolní Heršpice and Komárov, but on the other hand it lost land to Bohunice, Dolní Heršpice, Komárov and newly created Štyřice.

== Description ==
The cadastral territory of Horní Heršpice extends along both banks of the Svratka. An important railway route from Brno to Břeclav passes through Horní Heršpice from north to south, which divides the area of the original village into two parts. This line is further connected by the western line to Rosice and the eastern line to Přerov. The route of the D1 highway passes through the southern edge of Horní Heršpice, which intersects with the multi-lane road E461 here. South of the highway, in the southwestern corner of Horní Heršpice, there is a separate settlement of Nové Moravany, which originally belonged to Moravany. In the center of Horní Heršpice is the church of St. Klement Maria Hofbauer. Horní Heršpice is also home to many industrial and commercial companies, including the OBI market. In the center of the western part of Horní Heršpice there is, for example, the premises of Delta Pekárny a. with.

== Geography ==
The cadastral territory of Horní Heršpice is adjacent to Štýřice, to the east with Komárov and Brněnské Ivanovice, in the south with Dolní Heršpice, in the southwest with the municipality of Moravany and in the west with the city district of Brno-Bohunice.

== Territorial divisions ==
The cadastral territory of Horní Heršpice is further divided into 6 basic settlement units.

Basic settlement unit	Population		
Basic settlement unit	2011	2021	Change
Bednářova	584	557	-4.6%
Královka	58	46	-20.7%
Kšírova	574	602	+4.9%
Řehákova	301	300	-0.3%
Lány	529	335	-36.7%
Ořechovská	-	274	-

== Demographics ==
Historical population

Year	Pop.	±%
1869	687	—
1880	783	+14.0%
1890	888	+13.4%
1900	1,303	+46.7%
1910	2,113	+62.2%

Year	Pop.	±%
1921	1,745	−17.4%
1930	2,310	+32.4%
1950	3,023	+30.9%
1961	2,913	−3.6%
1970	2,775	−4.7%

Year	Pop.	±%
1980	2,281	−17.8%
1991	1,877	−17.7%
2001	1,858	−1.0%
2011	2,046	+10.1%
2021	2,114	+3.3%

Source: Censuses

== Transport ==
Public transport connections with other parts of Brno are available in Horní Heršpice via tram lines 2 and 5, day bus lines 49, 50 and E50, and night bus lines N94 and N96.
