= Brněnské Ivanovice =

- Cadastral territory of Brno
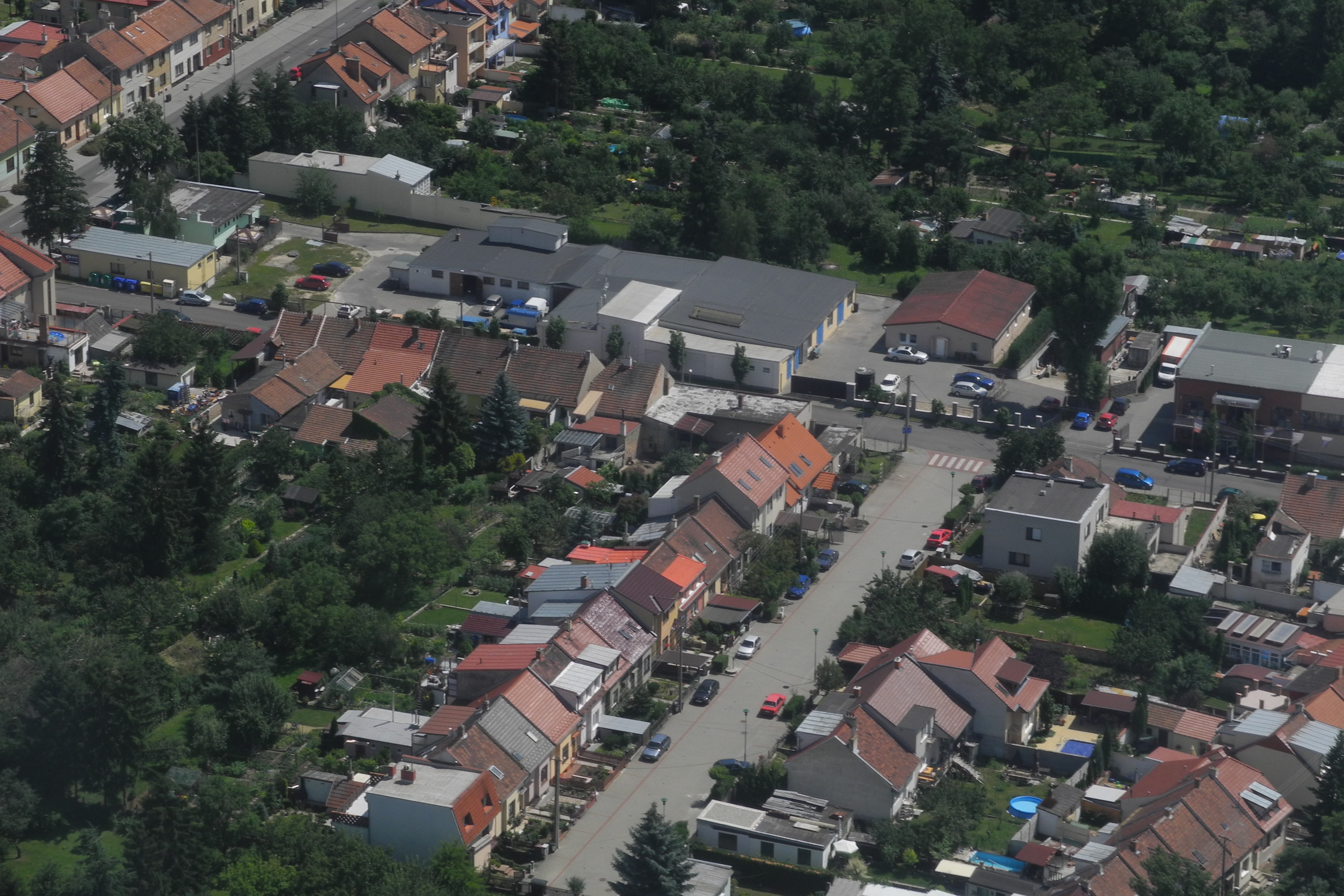
- Aerial view of Brněnské Ivanovice

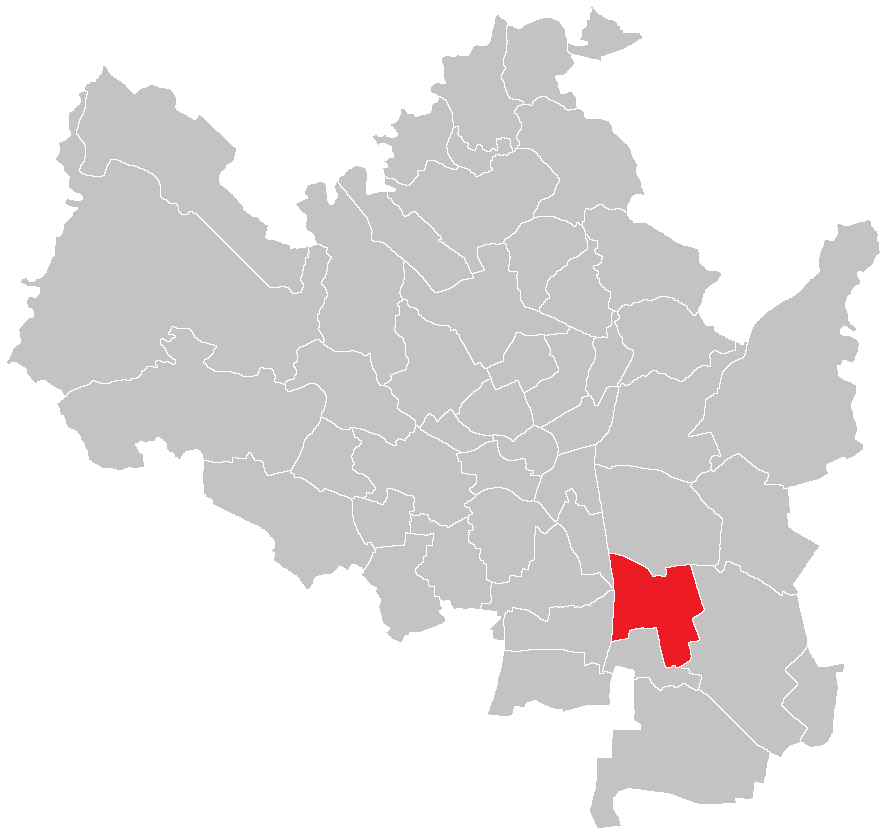
- Location of Brněnské Ivanovice in Brno 49°9′11″N 16°39′15″E
- Country: Czech Republic
- Region: South Moravian Region
- City: Brno
- City district: Brno-Tuřany

Area
  - Total: 4.17 km^{2} (1.61 sq mi)

Population (2021)
  - Total: 1,481
  - Density: 355/km^{2} (920/sq mi)
- Time zone: UTC+1 (CET)
  - Summer (DST): UTC+2 (CEST)
- Postal code: 620 00

Brněnské Ivanovice (German: Nennowitz, Hantec: Nenovice) is a municipal part and cadastral territory in the southeast of the city of Brno, Czech Republic. It has an area of 4.17 km². Originally its own municipality, it was annexed into Brno in 1919, and since November 24, 1990 it is part of the city district of Brno-Tuřany. Almost 1,500 people live here.

== Etymology ==
The village was originally called Velenovice. At first, it was actually the name of its inhabitants, Velenovice, which was derived from the personal name Velen and meant "Velenovice's people". Already from the 13th century, there are documented phonetic variations of this name, Lvenovice (formed by shortening from the undocumented Levenovice) and Lenovoce. By simplifying the initial phonetic group Lv-, Lenovoce or Venovice was further modified by assimilation of consonants to Nenovice, which has survived as a folk name until the present day and was also adopted into German (Nenowitz). Another variant that developed from Lvenovice was Elvanovice, from which, by leaning towards the personal name Ejvan, a variant of the name Ivan, Ejvanovice developed, or rather with the dialectal prefix V- (voko < oko) recorded in documents, Vejvanovice, which was edited into the written form Ivanovice at the end of the 19th century. The adjective Brněnské was acquired after the village was annexed into Brno in 1919 to distinguish it from Ivanovice u Brna located on the opposite, northern edge of Brno.

== History ==
Brněnské Ivanovice was its own municipality from 1854 to April 16, 1919. A smaller part of today's Brněnské Ivanovice originally belonged to Holásky, and so these parts of the modern district were only annexed to Brno with the annexation of Holásky on July 1, 1960.

== Geography ==
The entire territory of the natural monument Rájecká tůň, the entire nature reserve Černovický hájek and the northernmost part of the natural monument Holásecká jezera are located in Brněnské Ivanovice.

Brněnské Ivanovice borders Dolní Heršpice, Horní Heršpice and Komárov in the west, Černovice in the north, Tuřany in the east, and Holásky in the south.

== Territorial divisions ==
The cadastral territory of Brněnské Ivanovice is further divided into 2 basic settlement units.

Basic settlement unit	Population		
Basic settlement unit	2011	2021	Change
Brněnské Ivanovice	1,453	1,404	-3.4%
Kaštanová	35	77	+120.0%

== Demographics ==
Historical population

Year	Pop.	±%
1869	1,003	—
1880	1,059	+5.6%
1890	1,207	+14.0%
1900	1,337	+10.8%
1910	1,606	+20.1%

Year	Pop.	±%
1921	1,580	−1.6%
1930	2,129	+34.7%
1950	1,819	−14.6%
1961	1,834	+0.8%
1970	1,666	−9.2%

Year	Pop.	±%
1980	1,549	−7.0%
1991	1,335	−13.8%
2001	1,261	−5.5%
2011	1,488	+18.0%
2021	1,481	−0.5%

Source: Censuses

== Transport ==
Public transport connecting Brněnské Ivanovice with other parts of Brno is available via bus lines 40, 64, N95, via lines 48 and 74. The D1 motorway passes through the northern part of Brněnské Ivanovice, but there is no direct connection to it. The route of the railway line 300 Přerov - Brno, built in 1867-1870, thanks to which the municipality gained a direct connection with Brno, also passes through Brněnské Ivanovice in a north-south direction, however, there is no stop here. A highly trafficked road passes through Brněnské Ivanovice along Kaštanová and Tuřanská streets, continuing to neighboring Tuřany and further towards Hodonín.
