= Tuřany (Brno) =

- Cadastral territory of Brno
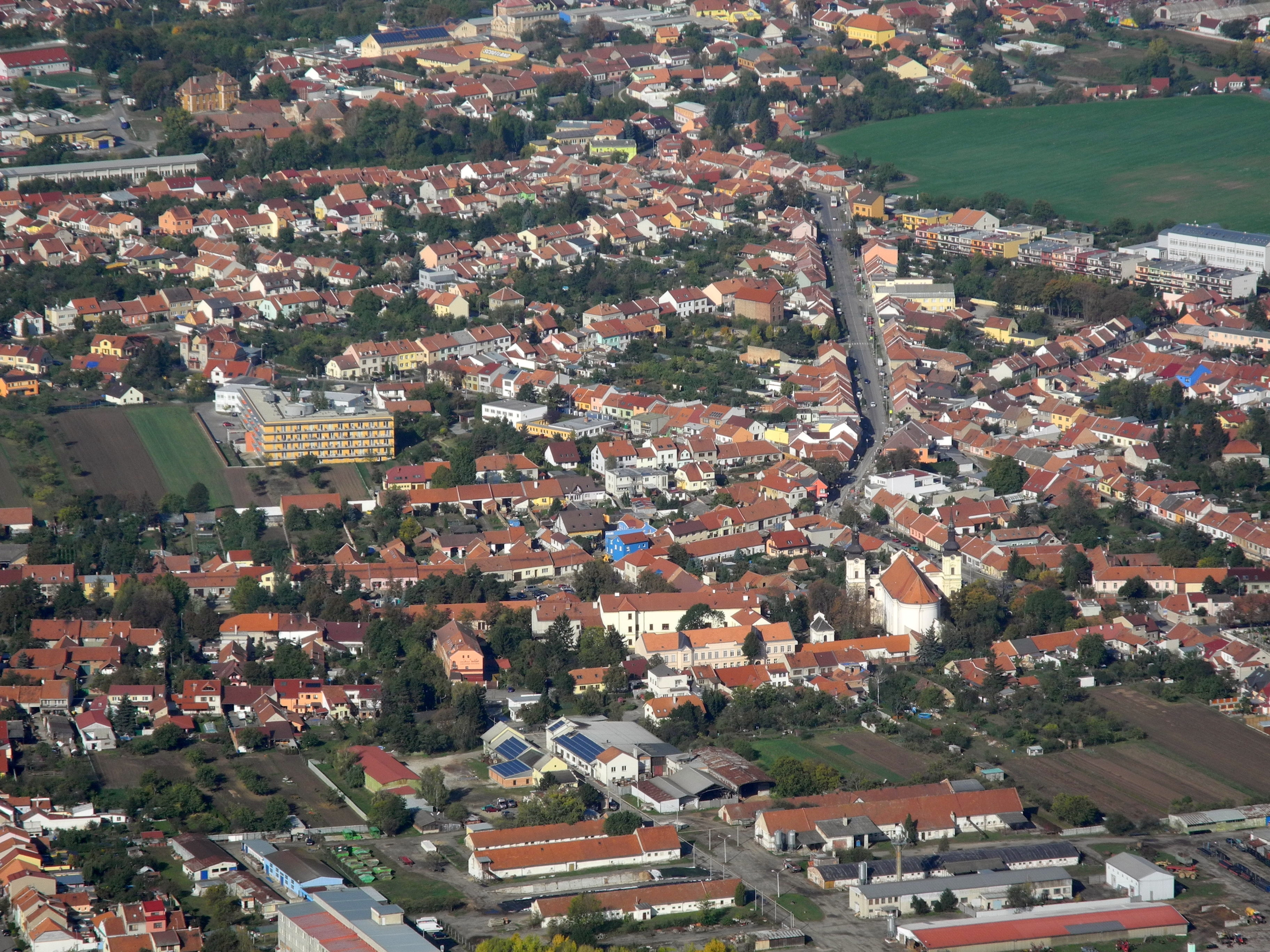
- Aerial view of Tuřany from the east

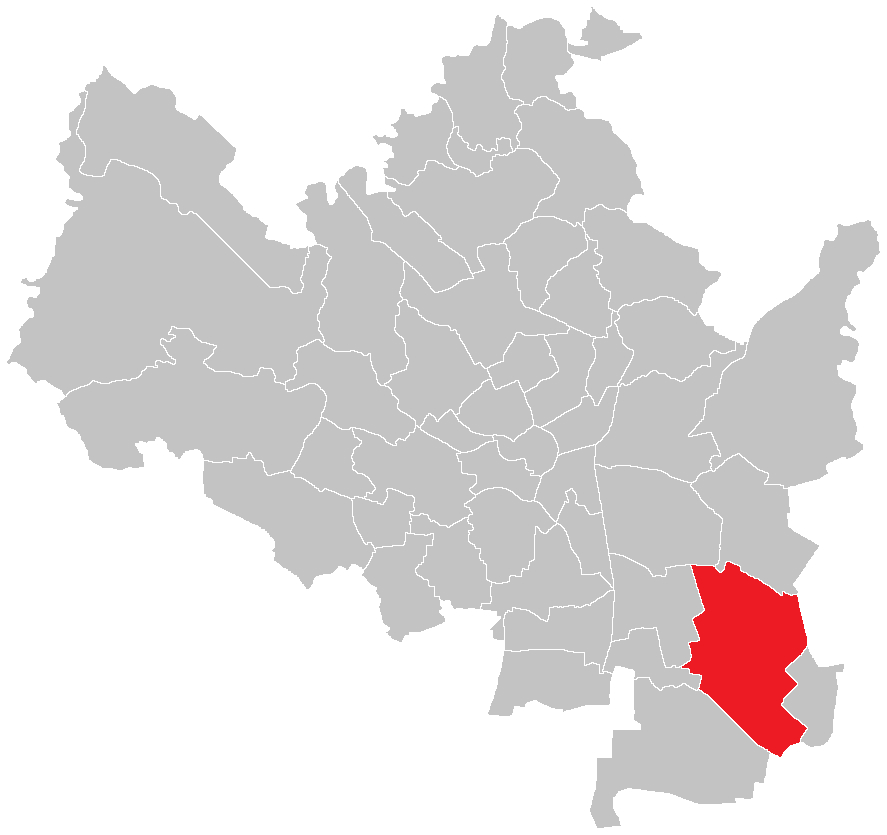
- Location of Tuřany in Brno 49°8′48″N 16°39′58″E
- Country: Czech Republic
- Region: South Moravian Region
- City: Brno
- City district: Brno-Tuřany

Area
  - Total: 9.61 km^{2} (3.71 sq mi)

Population (2021)
  - Total: 2,671
  - Density: 278/km^{2} (720/sq mi)
- Time zone: UTC+1 (CET)
  - Summer (DST): UTC+2 (CEST)
- Postal code: 620 00

Tuřany (German: Turas) is a municipal part and cadastral territory on the southeastern edge of the city of Brno, Czech Republic. Its area is 9.61 km². Originally its own municipality, it was annexed into Brno in 1919, and since 24 November 1990 it is part of the city district of Brno-Tuřany. It has over 2,600 inhabitants.

== Etymology ==
The original name of its inhabitants, Tuřané, was transferred to the settlement, which meant "people living on the aurochs field" or "people engaged in breeding or hunting aurochs". The form Tuřas recorded in 1292 (recorded as Thursas) is evidence of an ancient prepositionless locale. The German name Turas originated from Czech.

== History ==
Tuřany was annexed into Brno on April 16, 1919. In 1954, the Brno-Tuřany Airport was put into operation as a military airport, and on April 28, 1958, civilian operations were officially launched. Tuřany acquired its current borders only during the second cadastral reform of Brno, carried out in the second half of the 1960s. At that time, the western border of Tuřany was moved from the line leading along 1. května street and then further north, to the line leading along Rolencova, Glocova, Zezulova and Měšťanská streets, which annexed a number of houses originally belonging to Brněnské Ivanovice and to Holásky. Furthermore, Tuřany acquired a large northeastern part of Brněnské Ivanovice and some land in the south of Slatina. Conversely, the land with the original Tuřany elementary school was annexed to Brněnské Ivanovice, and the land southeast of Slatinka and north of the Vlárská train line (Brno - Trenčianska Teplá) was annexed to Slatina.

== Geography ==
Tuřany forms the center of Brno-Tuřany, while retaining their village character. With its development, Tuřany is almost completely connected to the development of neighboring Brněnské Ivanovice, with which it essentially forms one large settlement. The office of Brno-Tuřany is also located in the district. The dominant feature of the district is the Church of the Annunciation of the Virgin Mary. In the northeast of the original development of Tuřany lies the Brno-Tuřany airport. The D1 motorway route passes north of the urban area and the airport. In the north, directly on the border with the Brno-Slatina city district, new factories grew up in the second half of the first decade of the 21st century, which are part of the Černovická terasa industrial zone, the core of which lies in Slatina. Tuřanský potok springs at Tuřanské náměstí, then flows through neighboring Chrlice.

Tuřany is also home to the U Fuksové boudy vineyard track.

Tuřany borders Černovice and Slatina to the north, the municipality of Šlapanice and the cadastral territory of Dvorska to the east, the municipality of Sokolnice to the southeast, the cadastral territory of Chrlice to the southwest, and Holásky and Brněnské Ivanovice to the west.

== Territorial divisions ==
The cadastral territory of Tuřany is further divided into 6 basic settlement units.

Basic settlement unit	Population		
Basic settlement unit	2011	2021	Change
Tuřany	2,663	2,638	-0.9%
Pod Švédskými šancemi	0	0	+0%
Letiště Tuřany (Note: Kněžské háje before 2021.)	1	2	+100.0%
K Sokolnicím	7	31	+342.9%

== Demographics ==
Historical population

Year	Pop.	±%
1869	977	—
1880	1,083	+10.8%
1890	1,107	+2.2%
1900	1,556	+40.6%
1910	2,142	+37.7%

Year	Pop.	±%
1921	2,411	+12.6%
1930	2,734	+13.4%
1950	2,516	−8.0%
1961	2,483	−1.3%
1970	2,621	+5.6%

Year	Pop.	±%
1980	2,206	−15.8%
1991	1,986	−10.0%
2001	2,100	+5.7%
2011	2,671	+27.2%
2021	2,671	+0.0%

Source: Censuses

== Transport ==
The bus lines 40, 48, 73, 74, 78, 109, Š85 and N95 (during night time only) pass through Tuřany.
