= Brno-jih =

- City District of Brno
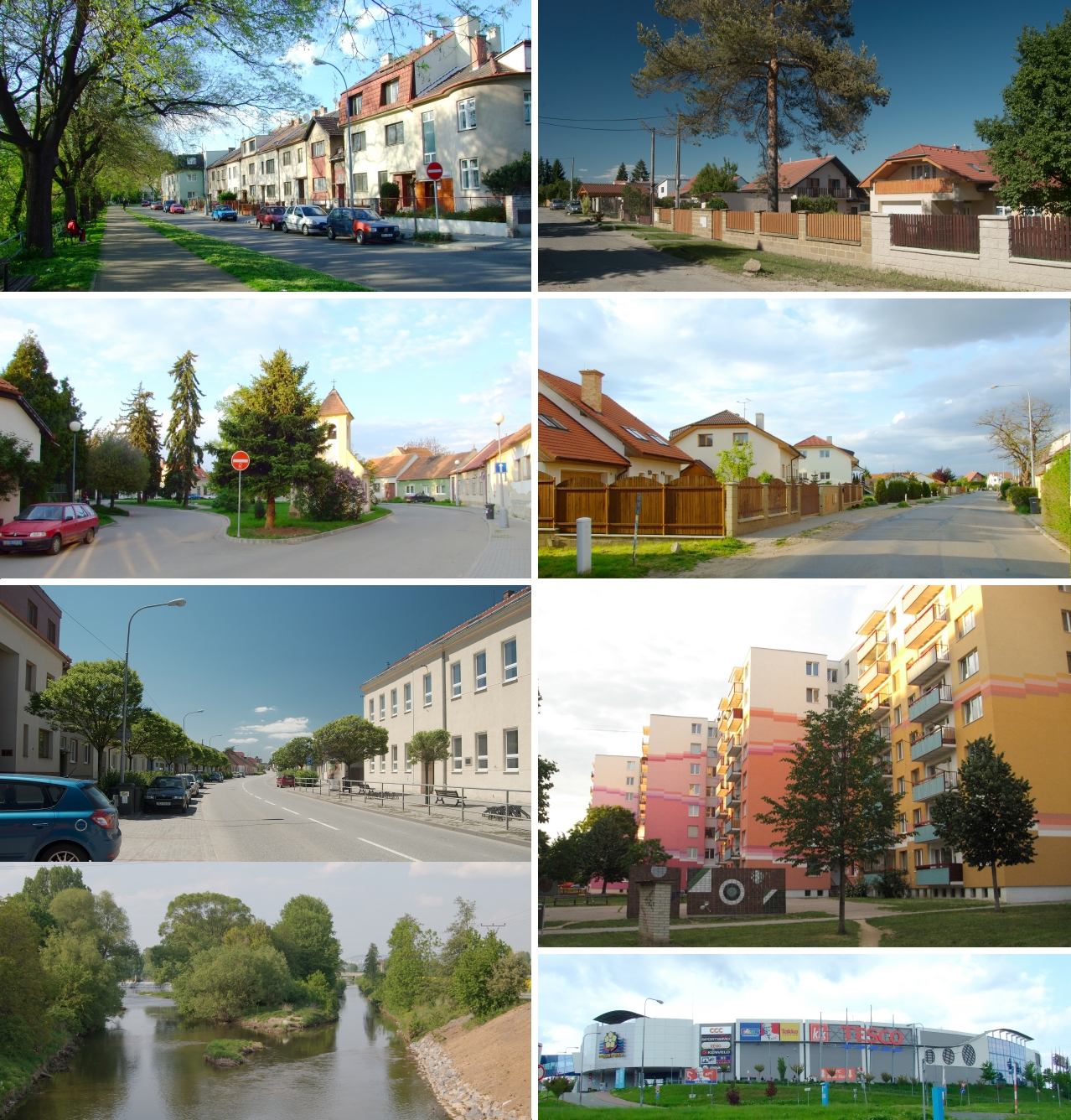

- Flag Coat of arms

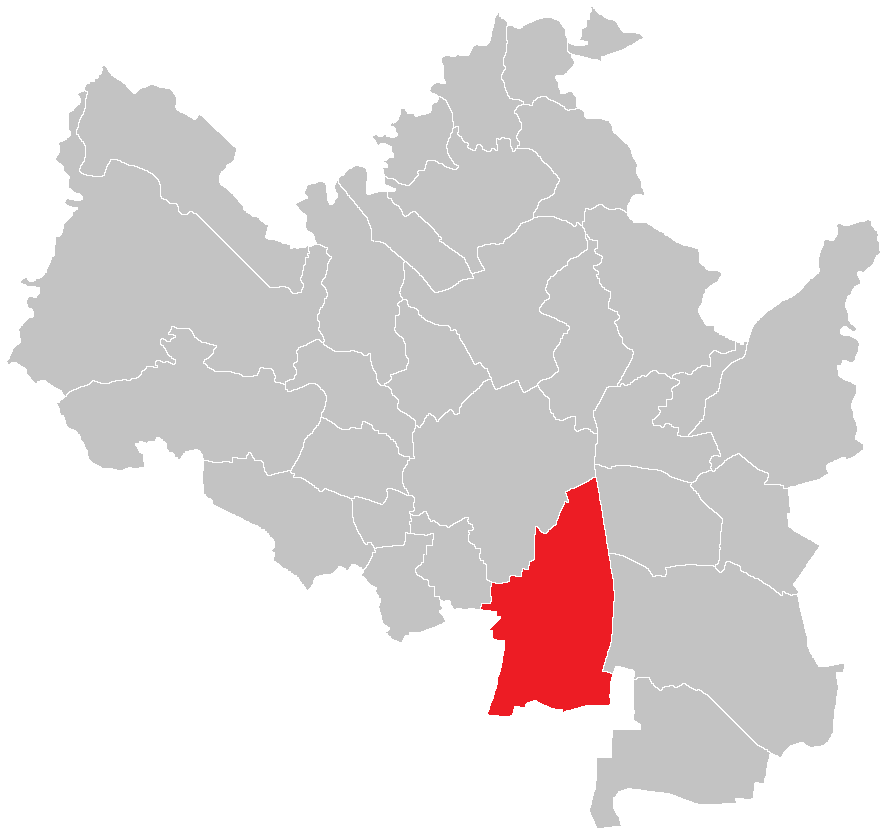
- Location of Brno-jih in Brno 49°10′28″N 16°37′22″E
- Country: Czech Republic
- Region: South Moravian Region
- City: Brno

Government
  - Mayor: David Grund (ODS)

Area
  - Total: 12.77 km^{2} (4.93 sq mi)

Population (2023)
  - Total: 10,502
  - Density: 822.4/km^{2} (2,130/sq mi)
- Time zone: UTC+1 (CET)
  - Summer (DST): UTC+2 (CEST)
- Postal code: 617 00
- Website: https://www.brno-jih.cz/

Brno-jih (lit. 'Brno-South') is a city district of Brno in the Czech Republic. The current city district was established on 24 November 1990. It is made up of the cadastral territories of Dolní Heršpice, Horní Heršpice, Komárov, Přízřenice and a small part of Trnitá. The total area amounts to 12.77 km^{2}. About 9,000 people live here.

== Demographics ==
As of the 2021 census, the population is 9,258, down 4% from 9,690 in the 2011 census.

Historical population

Year	Pop.	±%
1869	3,078	—
1880	3,546	+15.2%
1890	4,255	+20.0%
1900	4,766	+12.0%
1910	5,858	+22.9%

Year	Pop.	±%
1921	5,560	−5.1%
1930	7,394	+33.0%
1950	8,241	+11.5%
1961	8,192	−0.6%
1970	8,616	+5.2%

Year	Pop.	±%
1980	6,624	−23.1%
1991	7,582	+14.5%
2001	7,976	+5.2%
2011	9,690	+21.5%
2021	9,258	−4.5%

Source: Censuses

== Administration ==
On September 12, 2010, a local referendum on separation from Brno and the creation of a new municipality of Dolní Heršpice-Přízřenice was held in Dolní Heršpice and Přízřenice, however it did not succeed.

After the municipal elections in 2014, Daniel Kypr was elected mayor (ANO 2011). He was dismissed in December 2017 and Zdeněk Rotrekl (Chance for the South), who died in May 2018, was elected as the new mayor. Josef Haluza (ČSSD), who held this position from 2010 to 2014, was elected mayor at the constituent assembly meeting in autumn 2018.
