= Dvorska (Brno) =

- Cadastral territory of Brno
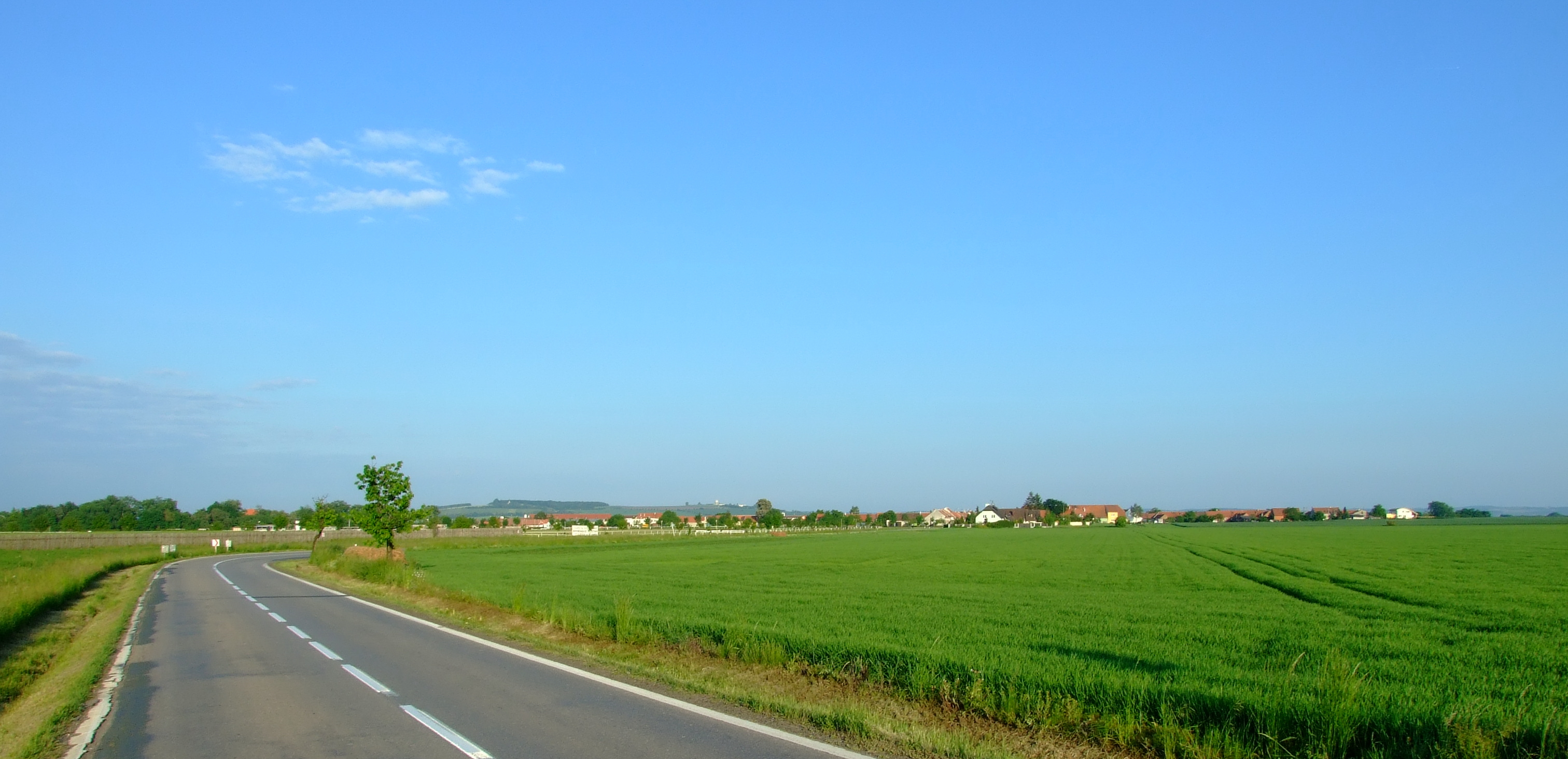
- Dvorska from the west

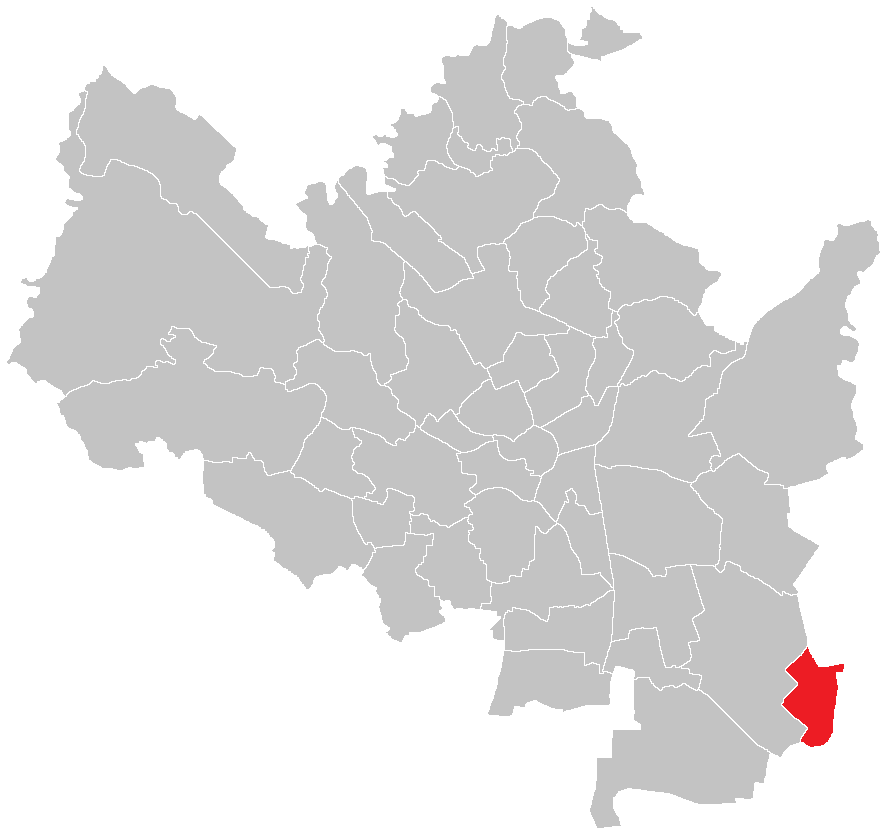
- Location of Dvorska in Brno 49°8′29″N 16°42′6″E
- Country: Czech Republic
- Region: South Moravian Region
- City: Brno
- City district: Brno-Tuřany

Area
  - Total: 2.23 km^{2} (0.86 sq mi)

Population (2021)
  - Total: 380
  - Density: 170/km^{2} (440/sq mi)
- Time zone: UTC+1 (CET)
  - Summer (DST): UTC+2 (CEST)
- Postal code: 620 00

Dvorska (German: Maxdorf) is a municipal part and cadastral territory on the southeastern edge of the city of Brno, Czech Republic. It covers an area of 2.23 km². Originally a municipality, it was annexed into Brno in 1971, and since 24 November 1990 it has been part of the city district of Brno-Tuřany. It has about 400 inhabitants. It is subdivided into only one basic settlement unit of the same name.

== History ==
Dvorska was formerly known as Maxmiliansdorf, or in Czech as Maxmiliánov; Maxdorf or in Czech Maxov or Marxov.

Dvorska was annexed into Brno on 26 November 1971. It was then part of the Brno X-Tuřany district. After its abolition, on 1 October 1975 Dvorska became part of the Brno IV district. Since 1990, Dvorska is part of the current city district of Brno-Tuřany.

== Geography ==
Dvorska is located by the Dunávka stream, having retained the character of a small village. The built-up area consists of three separate parts: the larger western part, including Vlčkova, Výsluní and part of Zapletalova streets, the small one-street northeastern part, including a separate part of Zapletalova streets, and the area of the local agricultural cooperative. Between the western and northeastern parts of Dvorska, northwest of the local road, there is a local pond on Dunávka. The peripheral part of the Brno-Tuřany Airport area extends into Dvorska's borders.

In the west, Dvorska borders the cadastral territory of Tuřany, in the northeast with the town of Šlapanice, in the east with Kobylnice, and in the southeast and south with Sokolnice.

== Demographics ==
Historical population

Year	Pop.	±%
1869	216	—
1880	227	+5.1%
1890	247	+8.8%
1900	241	−2.4%
1910	268	+11.2%

Year	Pop.	±%
1921	271	+1.1%
1930	421	+55.4%
1950	383	−9.0%
1961	392	+2.3%
1970	376	−4.1%

Year	Pop.	±%
1980	345	−8.2%
1991	314	−9.0%
2001	335	+6.7%
2011	357	+6.6%
2021	380	+6.4%

Source: Censuses

== Transport ==
The district is crossed by the road II/417 from Tuřany to Kobylnice, which forms Zapletalova street.Connection to the center of Brno is available by bus line 48, some of which continue to Kobylnice and Prace. In night time, Dvorska can be reached from the city center by bus line N89.
