= Tuřany (Kladno District) =

- Municipality
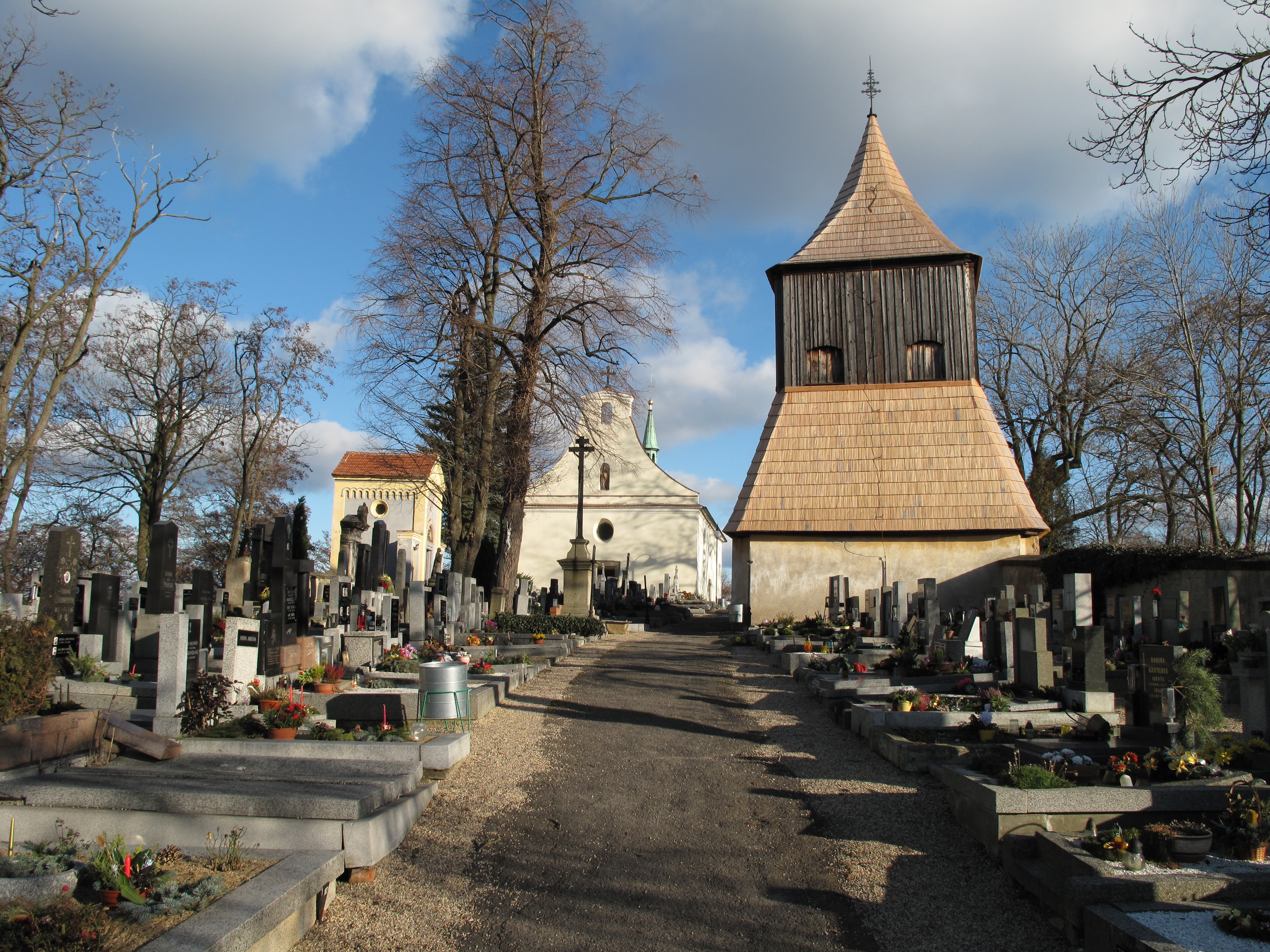
- Church of the Virgin Mary and a bell tower

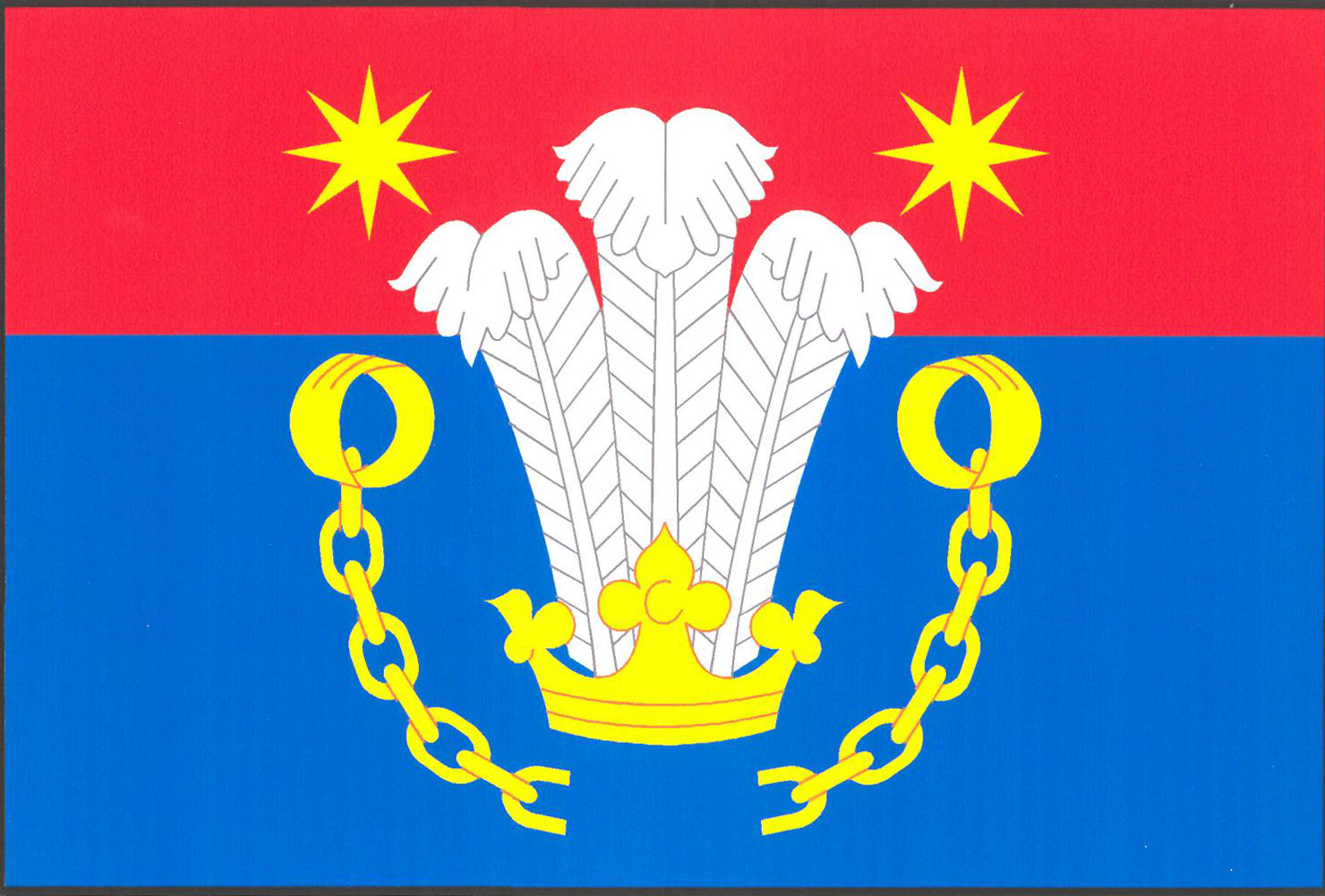
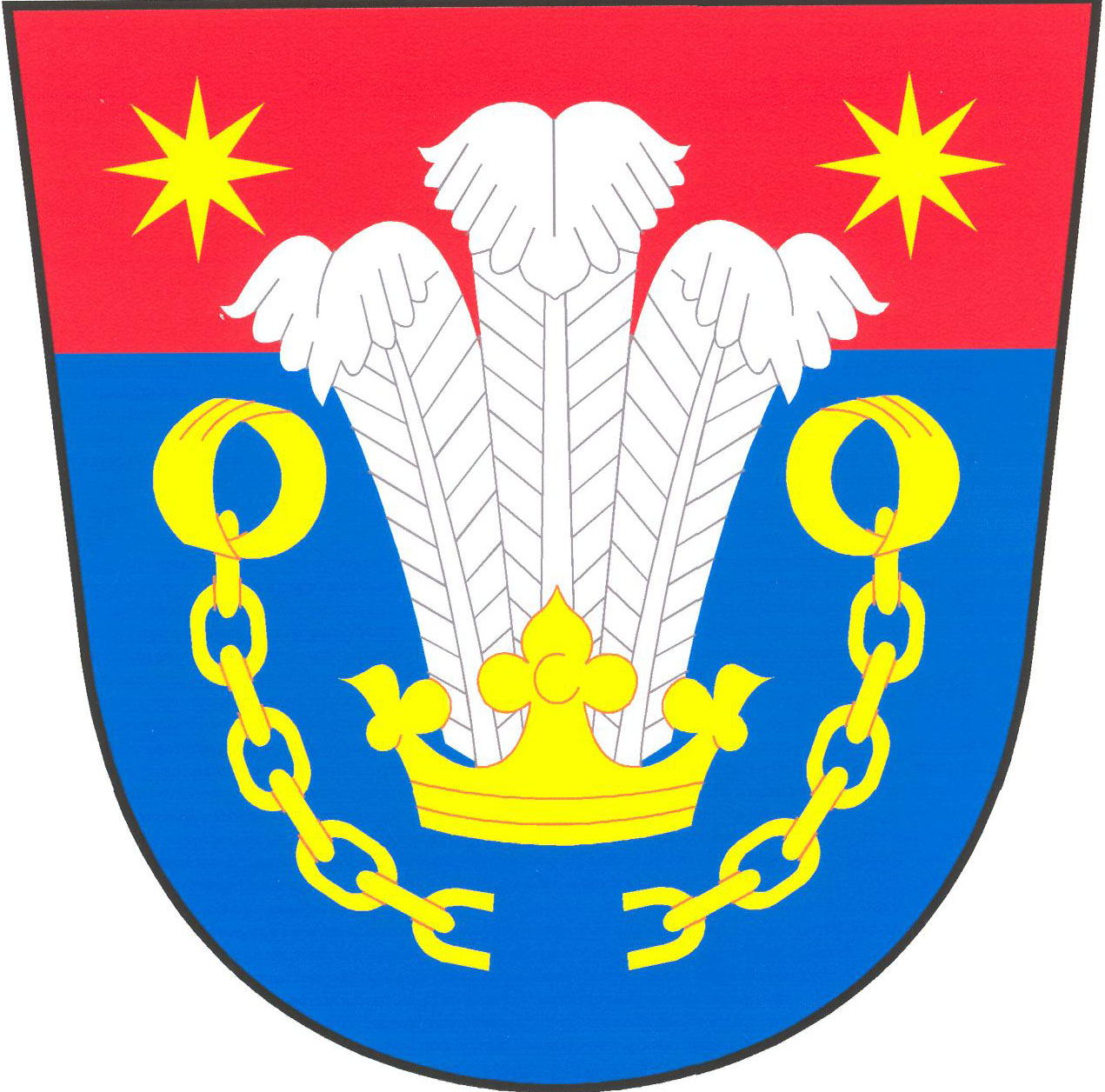
- Flag Coat of arms

- Location in the Czech Republic
- Coordinates: 50°13′56″N 14°1′45″E
- Country: Czech Republic
- Region: Central Bohemian
- District: Kladno
- First mentioned: 1115

Area
  - Total: 3.56 km^{2} (1.37 sq mi)
- Elevation: 332 m (1,089 ft)

Population (2026-01-01)
  - Total: 725
  - Density: 204/km^{2} (527/sq mi)
- Time zone: UTC+1 (CET)
  - Summer (DST): UTC+2 (CEST)
- Postal code: 273 79
- Website: www.turanyuslaneho.cz

Tuřany is a municipality and village in Kladno District in the Central Bohemian Region of the Czech Republic. It has about 700 inhabitants.

== Administrative division ==
Tuřany consists of two municipal parts (in brackets population according to the 2021 census):

- Tuřany (556)
- Byseň (67)

== Demographics ==
Historical population
Year	Pop.	±%
1869	618	—
1880	743	+20.2%
1890	742	−0.1%
1900	952	+28.3%
1910	947	−0.5%
1921	802	−15.3%
1930	666	−17.0%
1950	509	−23.6%
1961	473	−7.1%
1970	477	+0.8%
1980	466	−2.3%
1991	435	−6.7%
2001	477	+9.7%
2011	555	+16.4%
2021	623	+12.3%
Source: Censuses
