= Brno-Tuřany =

- City District of Brno
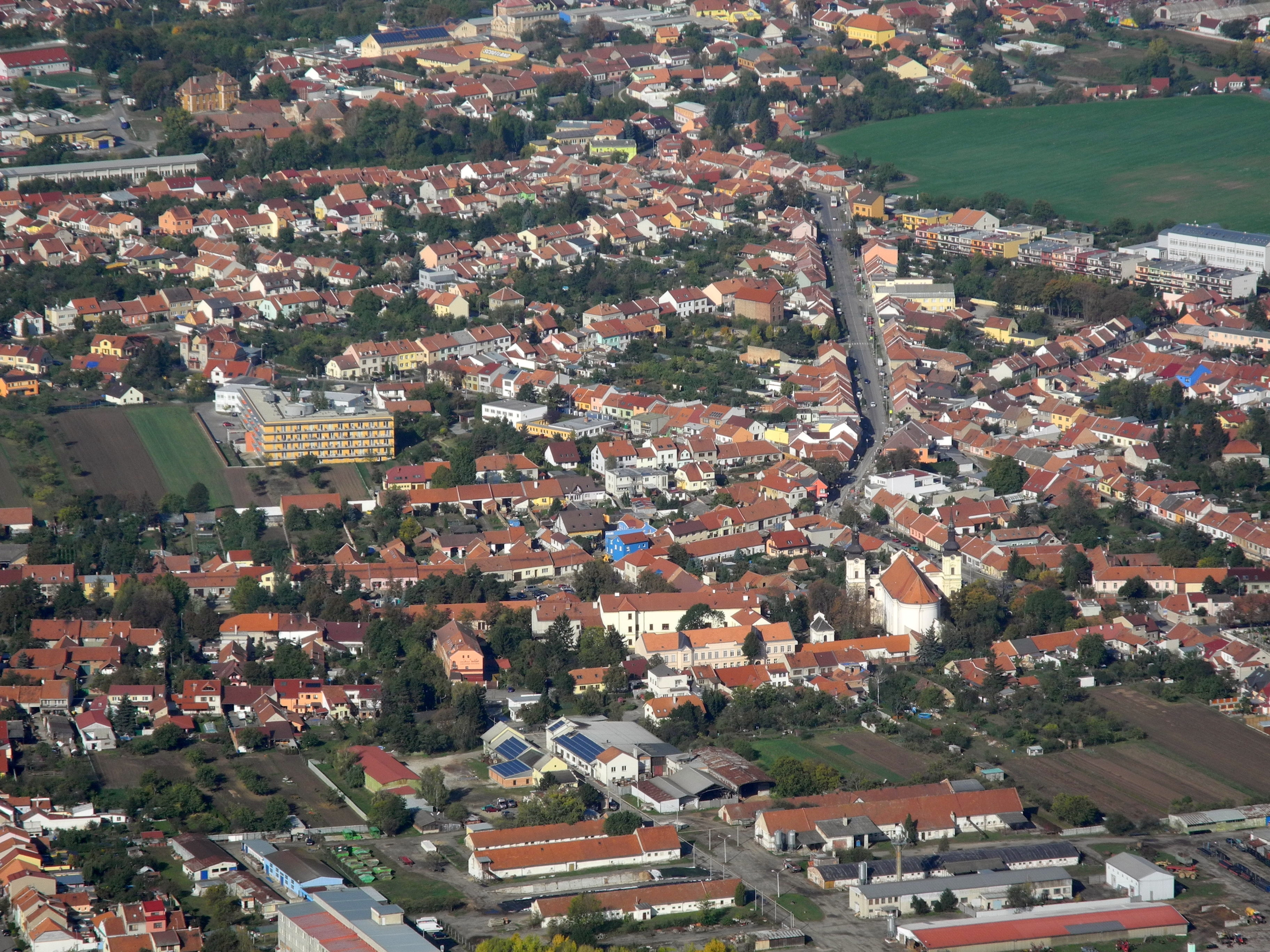
- View of Tuřany

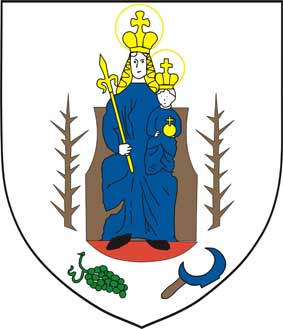
- Flag Coat of arms

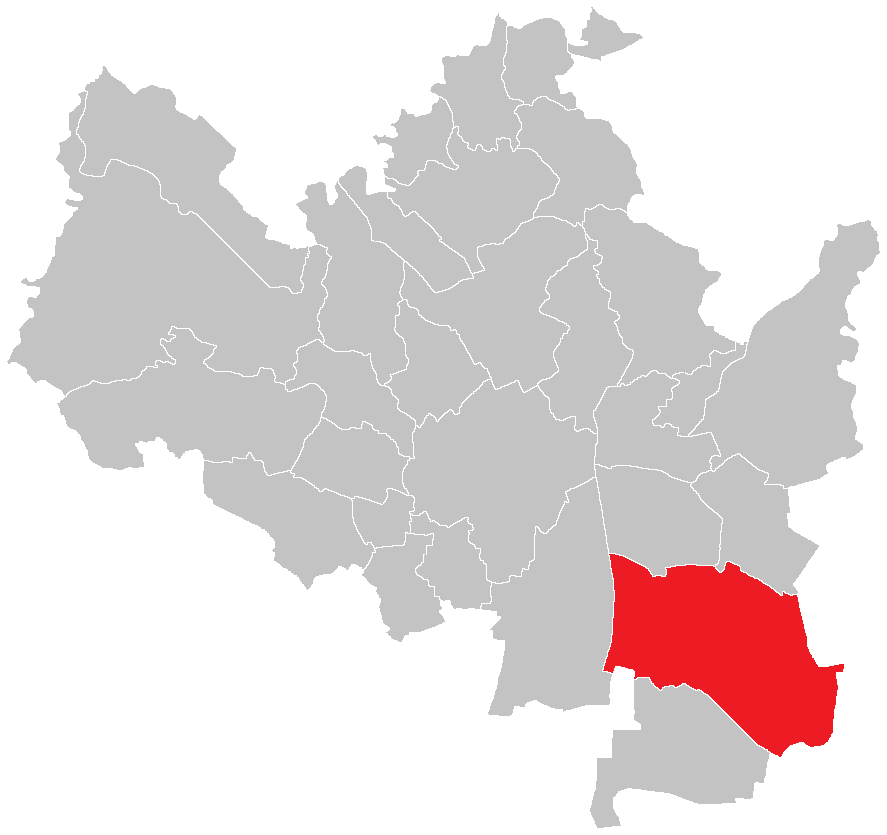
- Location of Brno-Tuřany in Brno 49°8′50″N 16°39′47″E
- Country: Czech Republic
- Region: South Moravian Region
- City: Brno

Government
  - Mayor: Radomír Vondra (STAN)

Area
  - Total: 17.84 km^{2} (6.89 sq mi)

Population (2023)
  - Total: 5,947
  - Density: 333.4/km^{2} (863.4/sq mi)
- Time zone: UTC+1 (CET)
  - Summer (DST): UTC+2 (CEST)
- Postal code: 620 00
- Website: https://www.turany.cz/

Brno-Tuřany is a city district in Brno, Czech Republic, located in the southeastern part of the city. It is made up of the cadastral territories of Brněnské Ivanovice, Dvorska, Holásky and Tuřany. The total area is 17.84 km². The city district was established on November 24, 1990, its office is located in Tuřany. About 5,900 inhabitants live here. It is known for the Brno-Tuřany Airport.

For the purposes of the senate elections, Brno-Tuřany is included in electoral district number 58 of Brno-City District.

== Demographics ==
The population of Brno-Tuřany has now flatlined after a long period of fast growth.

Historical population

Year	Pop.	±%
1869	2,461	—
1880	2,629	+6.8%
1890	2,900	+10.3%
1900	3,456	+19.2%
1910	4,406	+27.5%

Year	Pop.	±%
1921	4,693	+6.5%
1930	6,007	+28.0%
1950	6,102	+1.6%
1961	6,148	+0.8%
1970	5,780	−6.0%

Year	Pop.	±%
1980	5,099	−11.8%
1991	4,526	−11.2%
2001	4,631	+2.3%
2011	5,674	+22.5%
2021	5,674	+0.0%

Source: Censuses
