= Holásky =

- Cadastral territory of Brno
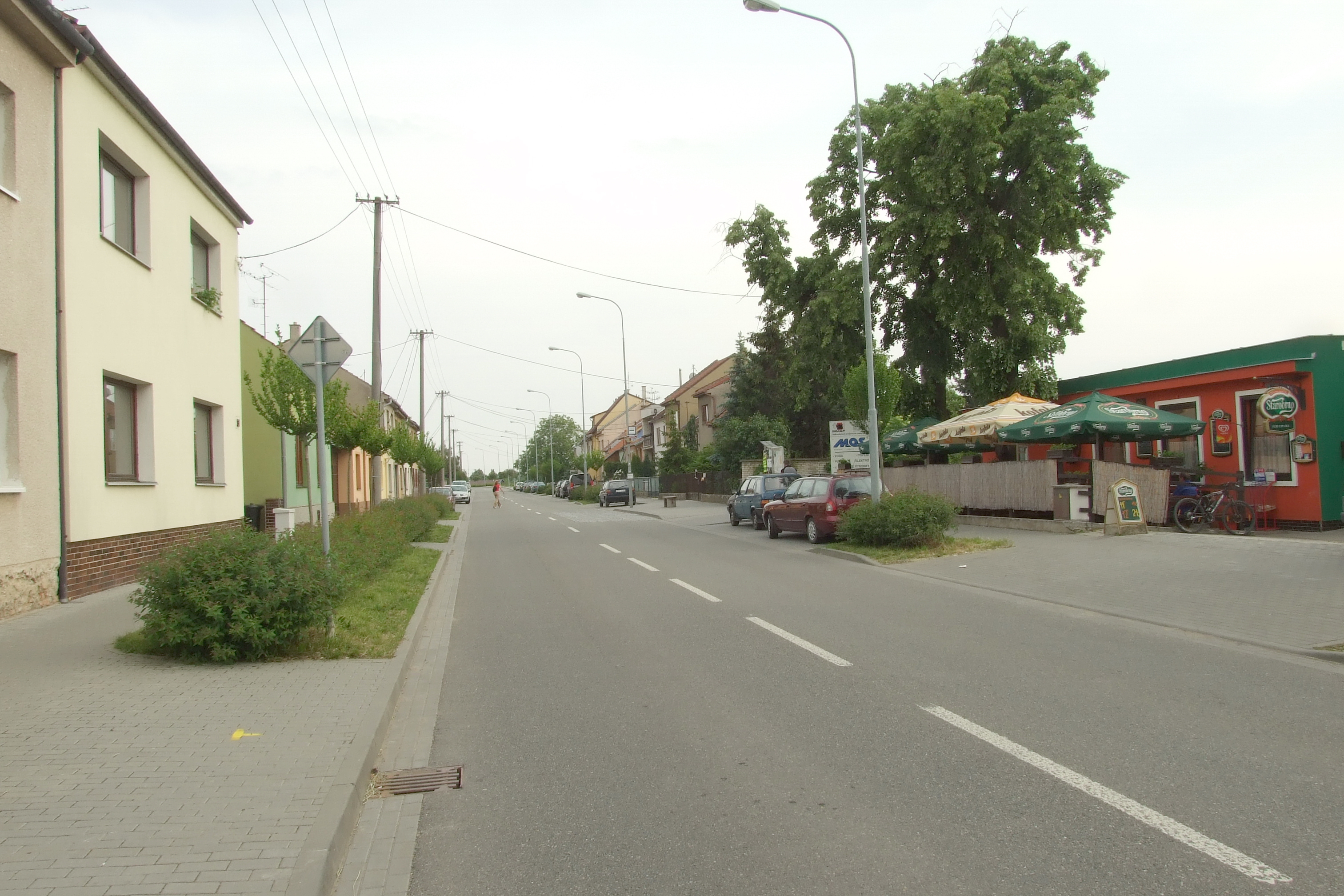
- V Aleji street

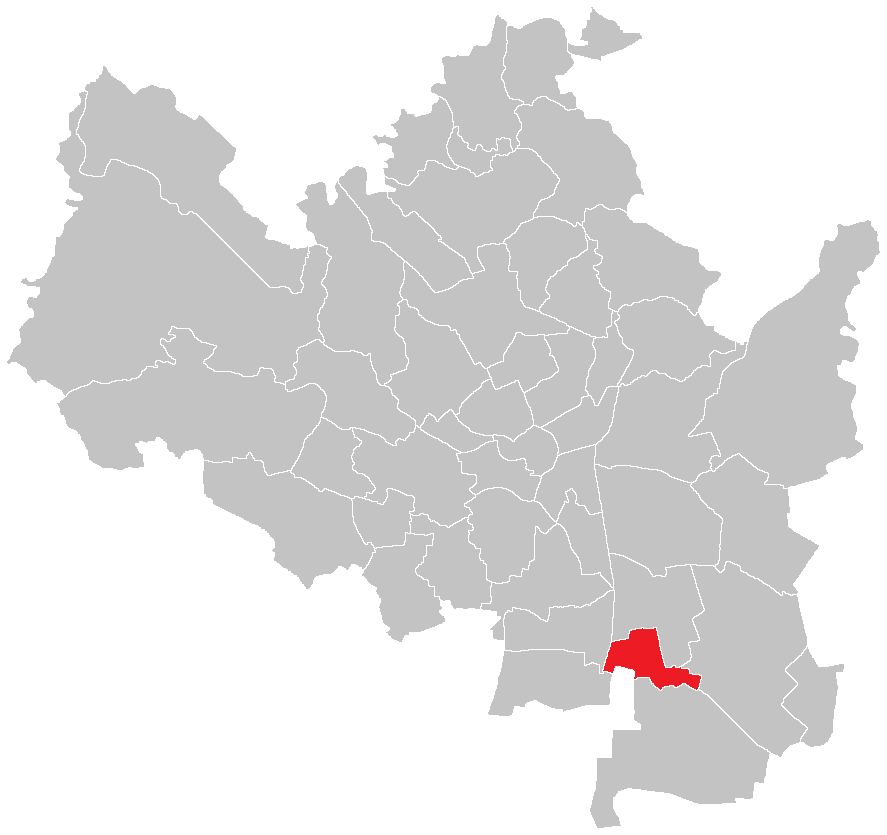
- Location of Holásky in Brno 49°8′36″N 16°39′3″E
- Country: Czech Republic
- Region: South Moravian Region
- City: Brno
- City district: Brno-Tuřany

Area
  - Total: 1.83 km^{2} (0.71 sq mi)

Population (2021)
  - Total: 1,142
  - Density: 624/km^{2} (1,620/sq mi)
- Time zone: UTC+1 (CET)
  - Summer (DST): UTC+2 (CEST)
- Postal code: 620 00

Holásky (German: Holasek) is a municipal part and cadastral territory on the southeastern edge of the city of Brno, Czech Republic. Its area is 1.83 km^{2}. Originally its own municipality, it was annexed into Brno in 1960, and since November 24, 1990 it has been part of the city district of Brno-Tuřany. It has about 1,100 inhabitants.

== History ==
In 1848, Holásky was a municipality. Parts of modern Holásky originally belonging to Ivanovice were annexed to Brno on April 16, 1919. Holásky was annexed to Brno on July 1, 1960.

== Geography ==
Holásky is located in the southwest part of Brno-Tuřany and has retained its village character. It consists of two separate parts; the southern part, formed by the original village, and the northern part, formed by the significantly separated built-up area of the streets of V Aleji, Ledárenská, Prodloužená, V tišině, Zahrádky, Popelova and Nenovická. The area of Popelova street seamlessly connects with the development of neighboring Brněnské Ivanovice. In the immediate vicinity of Holásky is the natural monument Holásecká jezera, formed by a system of ten interconnected lakes, nine of which are located in Holásky.

== Territorial divisions ==
The cadastral territory of Holásky is further divided into 6 basic settlement units.

Basic settlement unit	Population		
Basic settlement unit	2011	2021	Change
Na návsi	1,158	1,137	-1.8%
Holásecká jezera	0	5	-

== Demographics ==
Historical population

Year	Pop.	±%
1869	265	—
1880	260	−1.9%
1890	339	+30.4%
1900	322	−5.0%
1910	390	+21.1%

Year	Pop.	±%
1921	431	+10.5%
1930	723	+67.7%
1950	1,384	+91.4%
1961	1,439	+4.0%
1970	1,117	−22.4%

Year	Pop.	±%
1980	999	−10.6%
1991	891	−10.8%
2001	935	+4.9%
2011	1,158	+23.9%
2021	1,142	−1.4%

Source: Censuses

== Education ==
On Pozářní street there is the elementary school ZŠ Měšťanská, for first to fourth grades. On V Aleji there is a one grade only kindergarten.

== Transport ==
The bus lines 48, 64, Š85 and N95 (night time only) go through Holásky.
