= Moravany (Brno-Country District) =

- Municipality
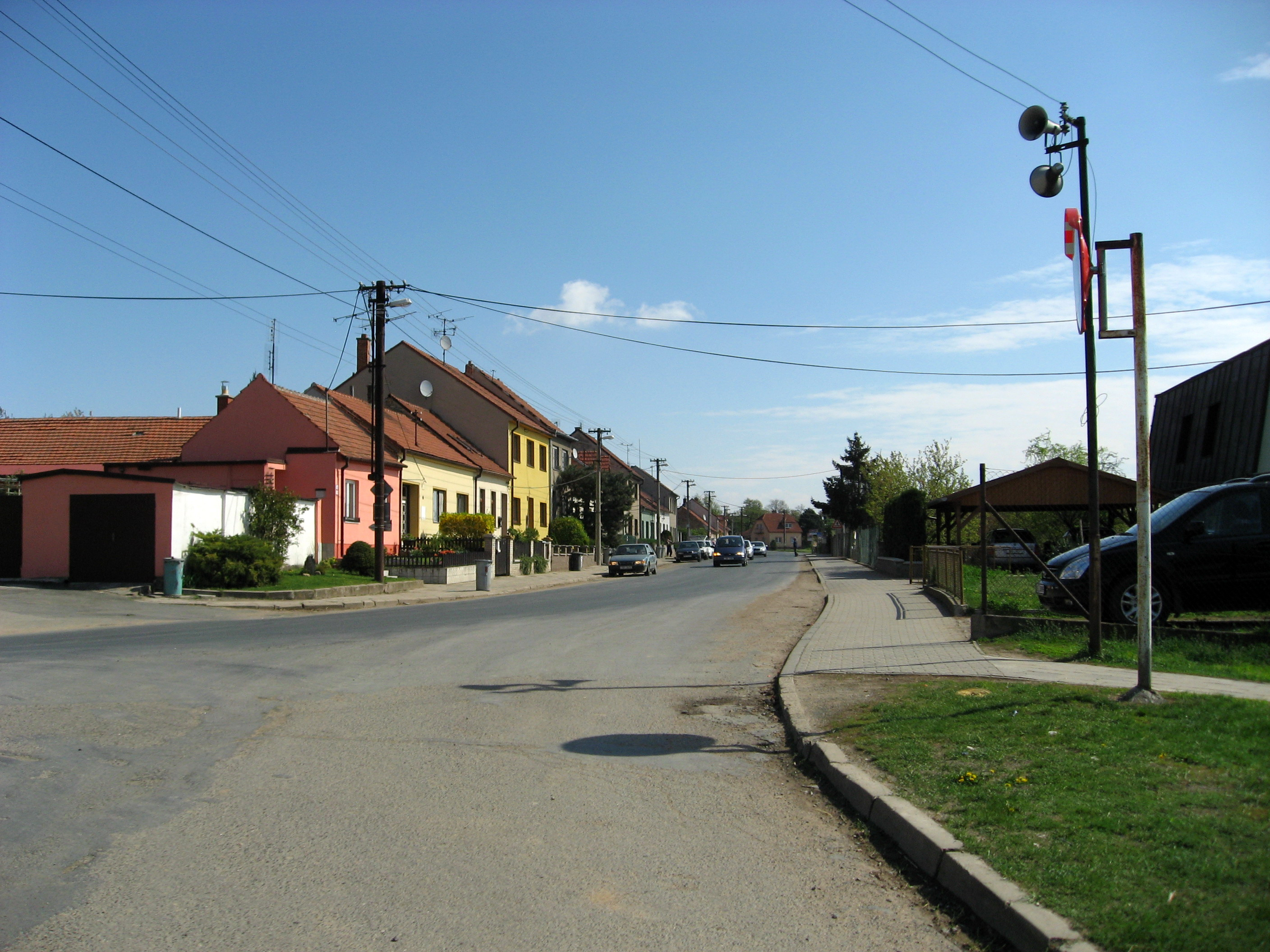
- Main road of Moravany

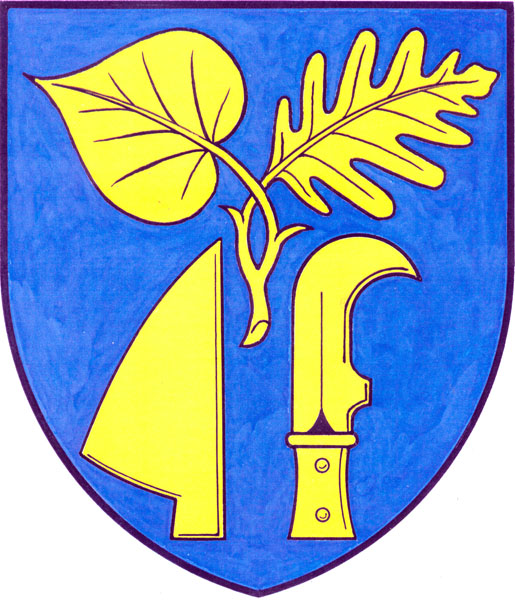
- Coat of arms

- Location in the Czech Republic
- Coordinates: 49°8′44″N 16°34′34″E
- Country: Czech Republic
- Region: South Moravian
- District: Brno-Country
- First mentioned: 1289

Area
  - Total: 6.64 km^{2} (2.56 sq mi)
- Elevation: 246 m (807 ft)

Population (2026-01-01)
  - Total: 3,607
  - Density: 543/km^{2} (1,410/sq mi)
- Time zone: UTC+1 (CET)
  - Summer (DST): UTC+2 (CEST)
- Postal code: 664 48
- Website: www.moravanyubrna.cz

Moravany (Czech pronunciation: [ˈmoravanɪ]; German: Morbes) is a municipality and village in Brno-Country District in the South Moravian Region of the Czech Republic. It has about 3,600 inhabitants.

== Geography ==
Moravany is located south of Brno, in its immediate vicinity. It lies on the border between the Dyje–Svratka Valley and Bobrava Highlands. The highest point is at 338 m (1,109 ft) above sea level. The Bobrava River flows along the southeastern municipal border.

== History ==
The first written mention of Moravany is from 1289. The village was owned by the Cistercian monastery in Staré Brno until its abolishment in 1782, then the owners often changed.

== Demographics ==
The population of Moravany has almost tripled since 2001. It belongs among the fastest growing municipalities in the country in the 21st century.

Historical population

Year	Pop.	±%
1869	468	—
1880	512	+9.4%
1890	561	+9.6%
1900	565	+0.7%
1910	603	+6.7%

Year	Pop.	±%
1921	600	−0.5%
1930	704	+17.3%
1950	795	+12.9%
1961	658	−17.2%
1970	727	+10.5%

Year	Pop.	±%
1980	1,068	+46.9%
1991	1,107	+3.7%
2001	1,208	+9.1%
2011	2,274	+88.2%
2021	3,598	+58.2%

Source: Censuses

== Transport ==
The D1 motorway from Prague to Brno runs through the territory of Moravany.

== Sights ==
The main landmark of Moravany is the Church of Saint Wenceslaus. It has an early Gothic core from the first half of the 13th century. It was rebuilt into its current Baroque form in the mid-18th century.
